= Camellia × intermedia =

Scientific classification
- Kingdom: Plantae
- Clade: Tracheophytes
- Clade: Angiosperms
- Clade: Eudicots
- Clade: Asterids
- Order: Ericales
- Family: Theaceae
- Genus: Camellia
- Species: C. × intermedia

Binomial name
- Camellia × intermedia (Tuyama) Nagam.

Synonyms
- Camellia japonica var. intermedia Tuyama

Hybrid species of flowering plant

Camellia × intermedia is a hybrid species in the genus Camellia, resulting from a cross between Camellia japonica and Camellia rusticana. It occurs naturally in central Japan, especially in the satoyama (rural landscape) areas of Toyama Prefecture, where it is locally known as "雪端椿" (Yukibana tsubaki).

Camellia × intermedia exhibits intermediate characteristics between its two parents in both morphology and physiology. Its anthers emit a moderate blue fluorescence under ultraviolet light, whereas those of C. japonica show almost no fluorescence and those of C. rusticana fluoresce strongly. This fluorescence is derived from two anthranilate compounds in the anthers, the contents of which are also intermediate between the two parent species. These intermediate traits confirm its hybrid origin and provide insights into the pollinator shift from insect pollination (entomophily) to bird pollination (ornithophily) within the genus Camellia.

== Notes ==
- This article contains text translated from the Qiuwen Baike article, which is licensed under the Creative Commons Attribution-ShareAlike 4.0 International License.
