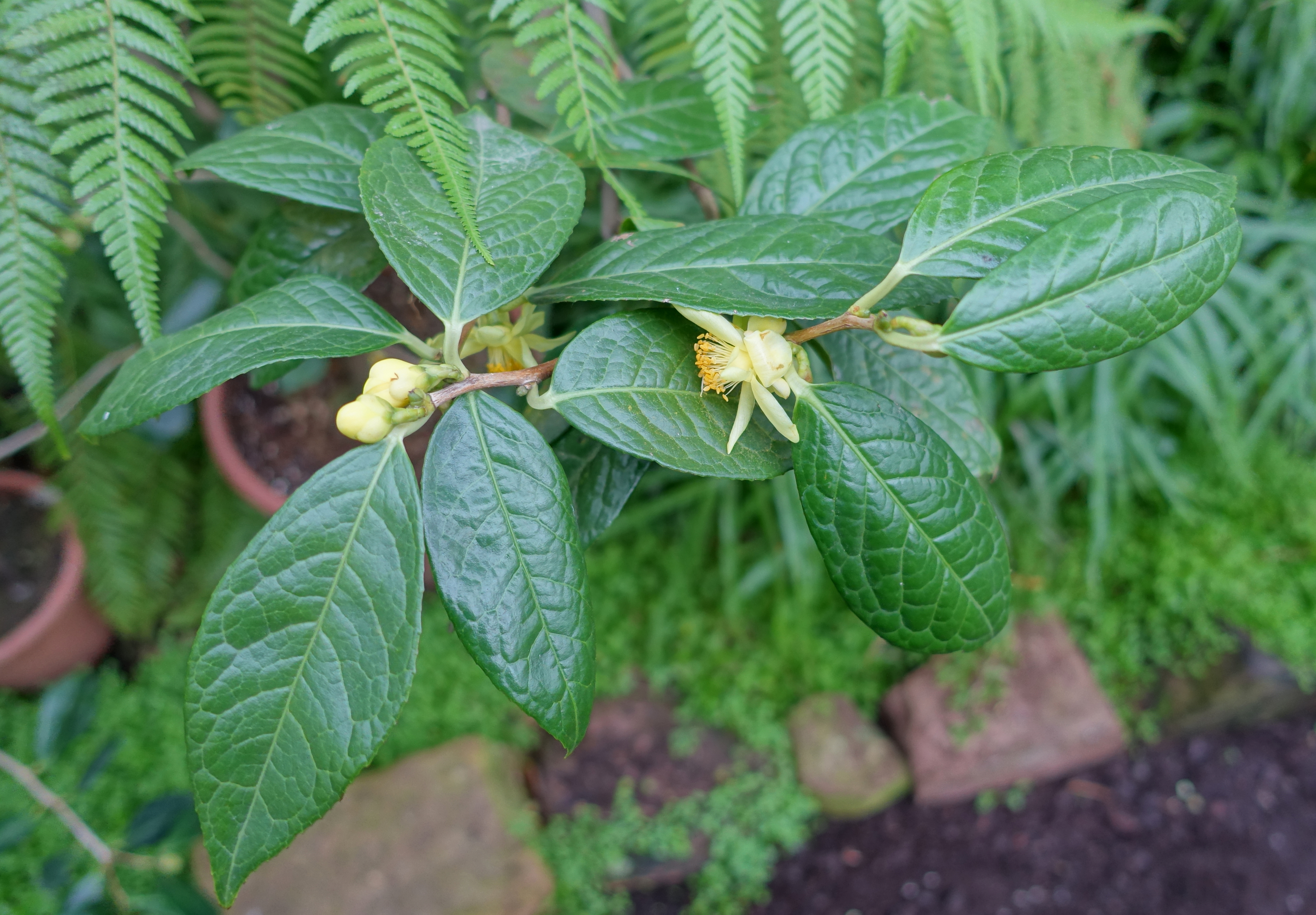

Conservation status
- Endangered (IUCN 3.1)

Scientific classification
- Kingdom: Plantae
- Clade: Tracheophytes
- Clade: Angiosperms
- Clade: Eudicots
- Clade: Asterids
- Order: Ericales
- Family: Theaceae
- Genus: Camellia
- Species: C. chrysanthoides

Binomial name
- Camellia chrysanthoides H.T.Chang

= Camellia chrysanthoides =

Species of flowering plant

Camellia chrysanthoides (Chinese: 薄叶金花茶) is a species of camellia endemic to Longzhou and Pingxiang counties in Guangxi province, China. It is a shrub or small tree growing between 1.5 and 5 meters in height, with yellow flowers. It is endangered in the wild, with about 20-100 mature individuals remaining.

== Synonyms ==
- Camellia longzhouensis
- Camellia xiashiensis
