= Camellia chinmeiae =

Scientific classification
- Kingdom: Plantae
- Clade: Tracheophytes
- Clade: Angiosperms
- Clade: Eudicots
- Clade: Asterids
- Order: Ericales
- Family: Theaceae
- Genus: Camellia
- Species: C. chinmeiae

Binomial name
- Camellia chinmeiae S.L.Lee & T.Y.A.Yang

Species of tree

Camellia chinmeiae is an endemic species of small evergreen tree. It is of the genus Camellia (Chinese: 茶花; pinyin: cháhuā, literally: "tea flower") of flowering plants in the family Theaceae. C. chinmeiae has sessile flowers, six to ten perules, four or five white, early deciduous petals, yellow radiating stamens that are separate to nearly-separate to the base, style 6–7 mm in length and fused 1/2 to 2/3 from the base, densely tomentose ovary. The globose fruit is with beaked or unbeaked capsule.

== Taxonomy ==
The species was first formally described in 2019. The authors spelt the epithet chinmeii, but as it derives from the name of Ms. Chin-Mei Hung, who first recognized Camellia chinmeii as a new taxon in 2010, it should have the feminine form chinmeiae, and has been corrected in the International Plant Names Index, and in taxonomic databases such as Plants of the World Online.

== Distribution and ecology ==
The species is endemic to Taiwan. Camellia chinmeiae occurs mainly in mountainous areas, with elevations of between 2000 and 2350 m on gentle slopes in the forests on Mt. Weishangshan, Nantou County, in central Taiwan.
