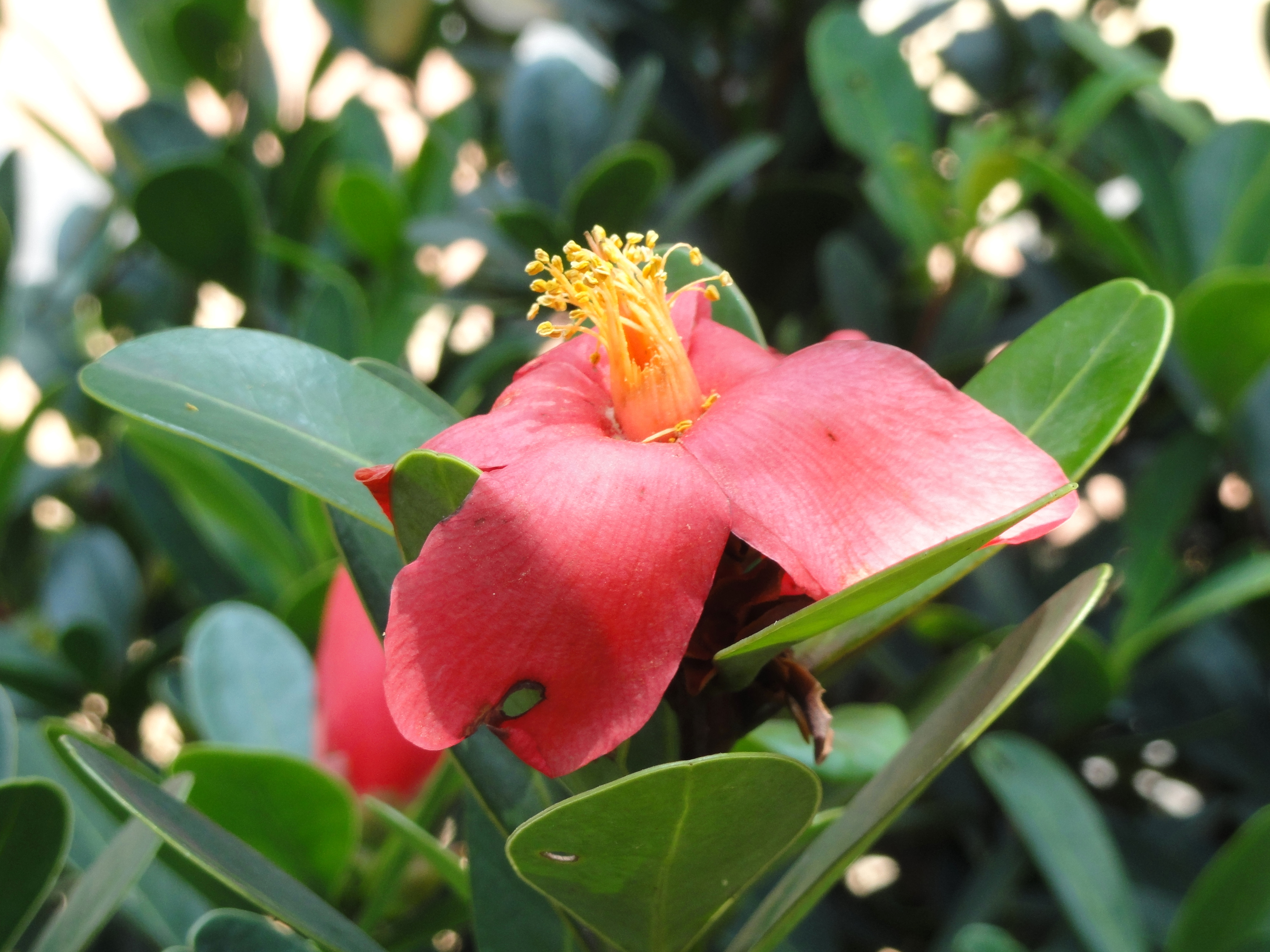
- A specimen in the Kunming Botanical Garden, Kunming, Yunnan, China. 2011

Conservation status
- Critically Endangered (IUCN 3.1)

Scientific classification
- Kingdom: Plantae
- Clade: Embryophytes
- Clade: Tracheophytes
- Clade: Spermatophytes
- Clade: Angiosperms
- Clade: Eudicots
- Clade: Asterids
- Order: Ericales
- Family: Theaceae
- Genus: Camellia
- Species: C. azalea

Binomial name
- Camellia azalea C.F.Wei
- It is endemic to Yangchun, Guangdong, China

Synonyms
- Camellia changii C.X.Ye

= Camellia azalea =

Species of flowering plant

Camellia azalea, native to the Ehuangzhang Provincial Nature Reserve in Yangchun City, Guangdong, China, is a national first-class protected plant in China.

== Description ==
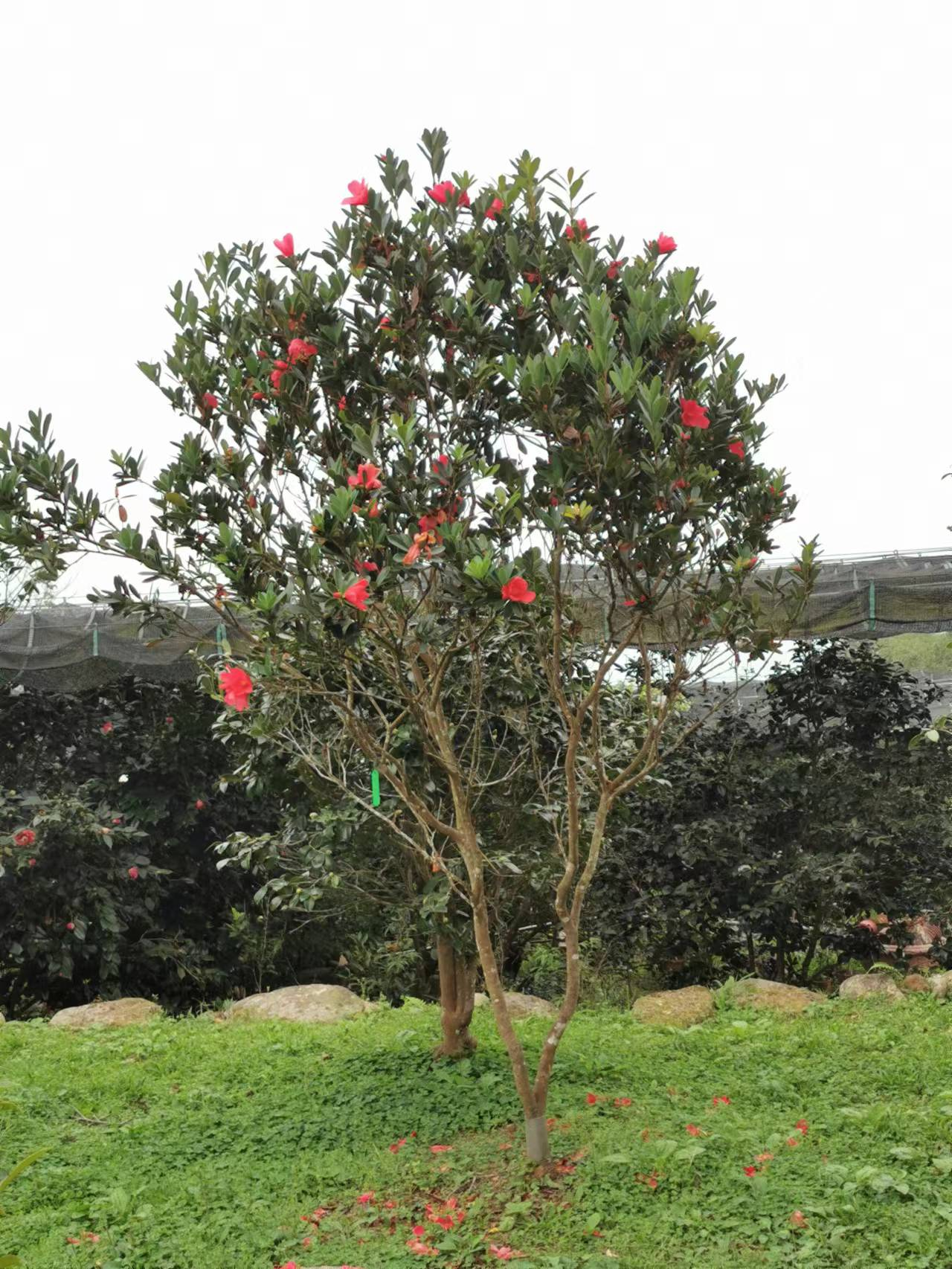
Flowering Camellia azalea

=== Vegetative characteristics ===
It is a small tree or an evergreen shrub, and grows up to 4 meters tall.

=== Generative characteristics ===
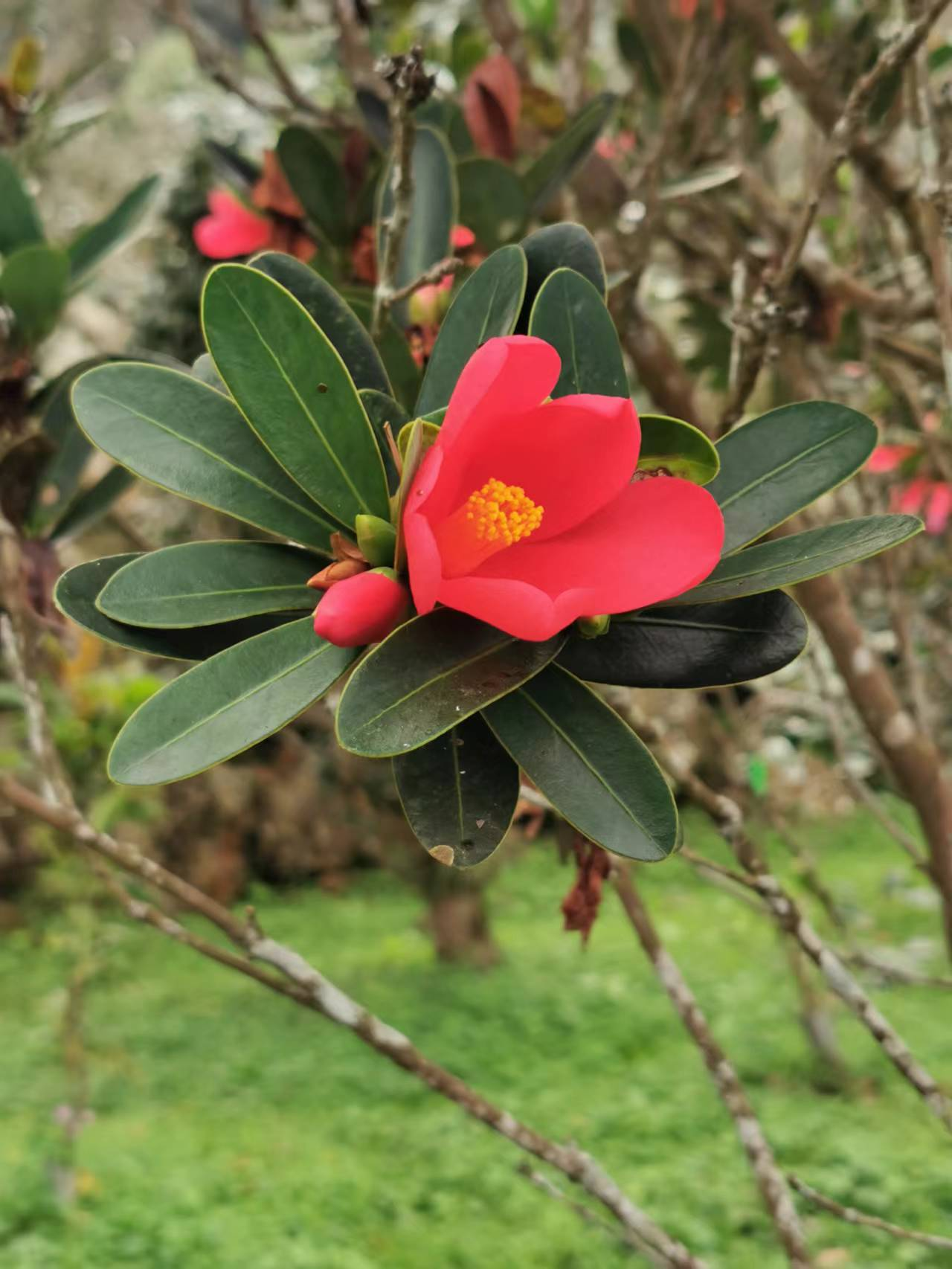
Camellia azalea flower

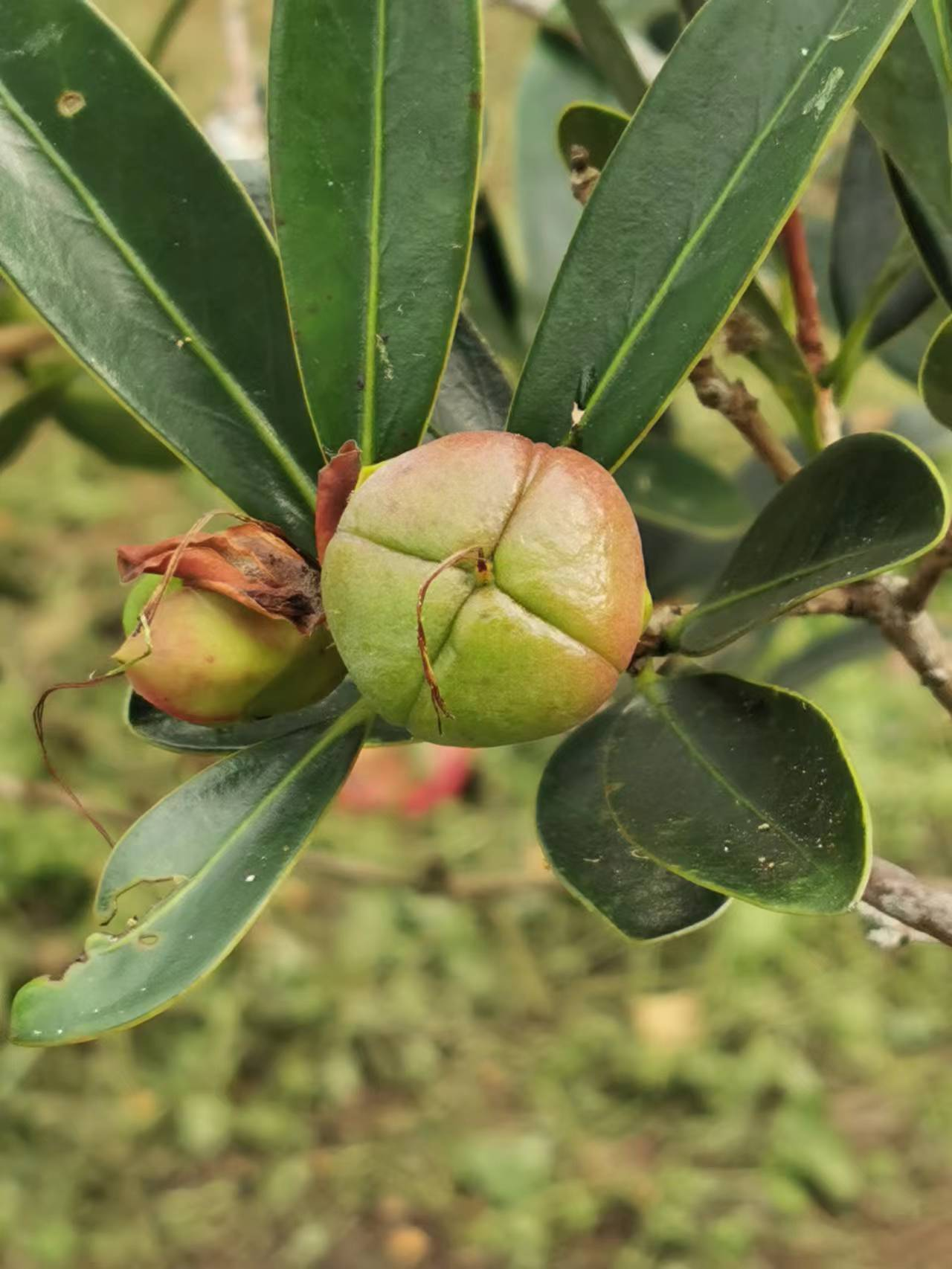
Camellia azalea capsule fruit

The plant tends to grow bright red flowers that can be found in clusters of 1 to 5 and of a size of 9-10cm in diameter.

== Taxonomy ==
It was described by Chao Fen Wei in 1986.

== Distribution and habitat ==
It is endemic to Yangchun, Guangdong, China where it grows in hilly forests among rocks along rivers at elevations of 100–500 m above sea level.

== Conservation ==
Camellia azalea is a critically endangered species.

== Common names ==
The Chinese name of Camellia azalea is 杜鹃叶山茶/Rhododendron leaf camellia (dù juān yè shān chá), because of its rhododendron-like leaf shape. Compared with other camellia species, the flower of Camellia azalea is more like Rhododendron, so it is commonly known as 杜鹃红山茶/Rhododendron red camellia. It is also commonly known as 四季紅山茶/Four Seasons Red Camellia or 四季茶花/Four Seasons Camellia, because it can flower throughout the year, July-September is the most prosperous period of flowering, which is different from the habit of Camellia flowering in winter.
