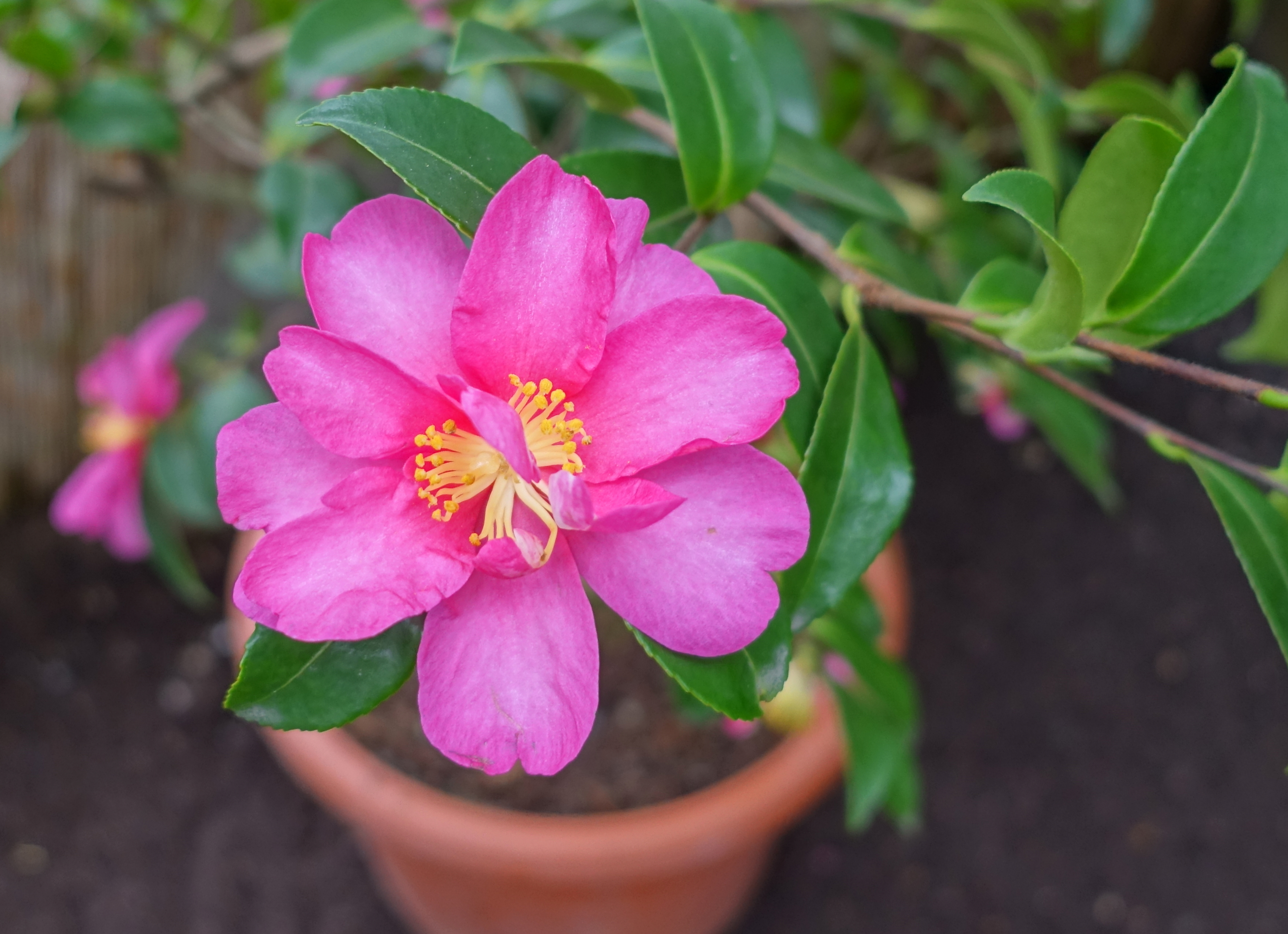
- Camellia hiemalis 'Kanjiro'

Scientific classification
- Kingdom: Plantae
- Clade: Tracheophytes
- Clade: Angiosperms
- Clade: Eudicots
- Clade: Asterids
- Order: Ericales
- Family: Theaceae
- Genus: Camellia
- Species: C. hiemalis

Binomial name
- Camellia hiemalis Nakai

= Camellia hiemalis =

Species of flowering plant

Camellia hiemalis is a species of camellia that is a shrub or small tree, with evergreen leaves and red, pink, or white flowers.
