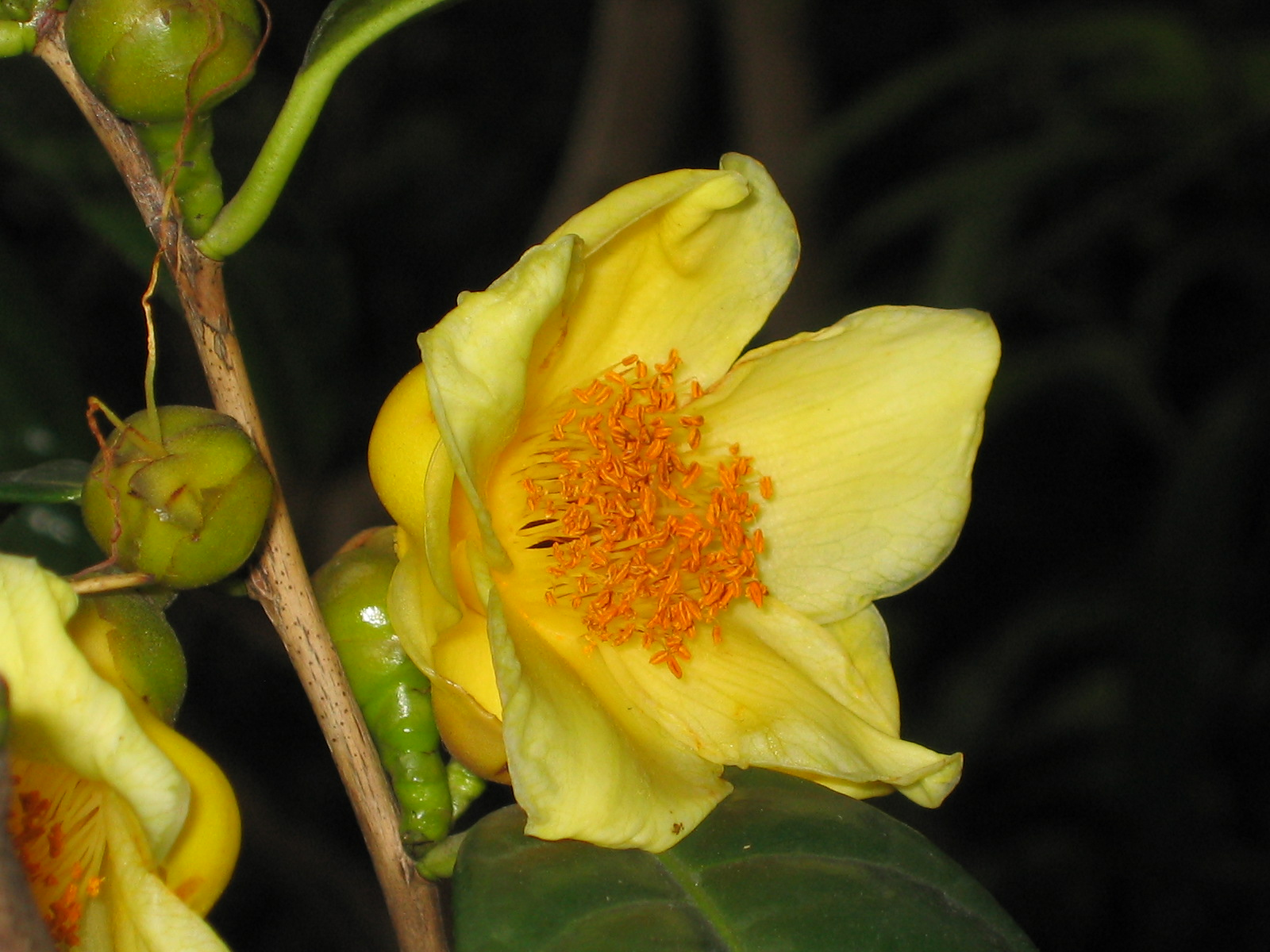

Conservation status
- Endangered (IUCN 3.1)

Scientific classification
- Kingdom: Plantae
- Clade: Tracheophytes
- Clade: Angiosperms
- Clade: Eudicots
- Clade: Asterids
- Order: Ericales
- Family: Theaceae
- Genus: Camellia
- Species: C. euphlebia

Binomial name
- Camellia euphlebia Merr. ex Sealy

= Camellia euphlebia =

Species of flowering plant

Camellia euphlebia is a species of plant in the family Theaceae. It is found in China and Vietnam. It is threatened by habitat loss.
