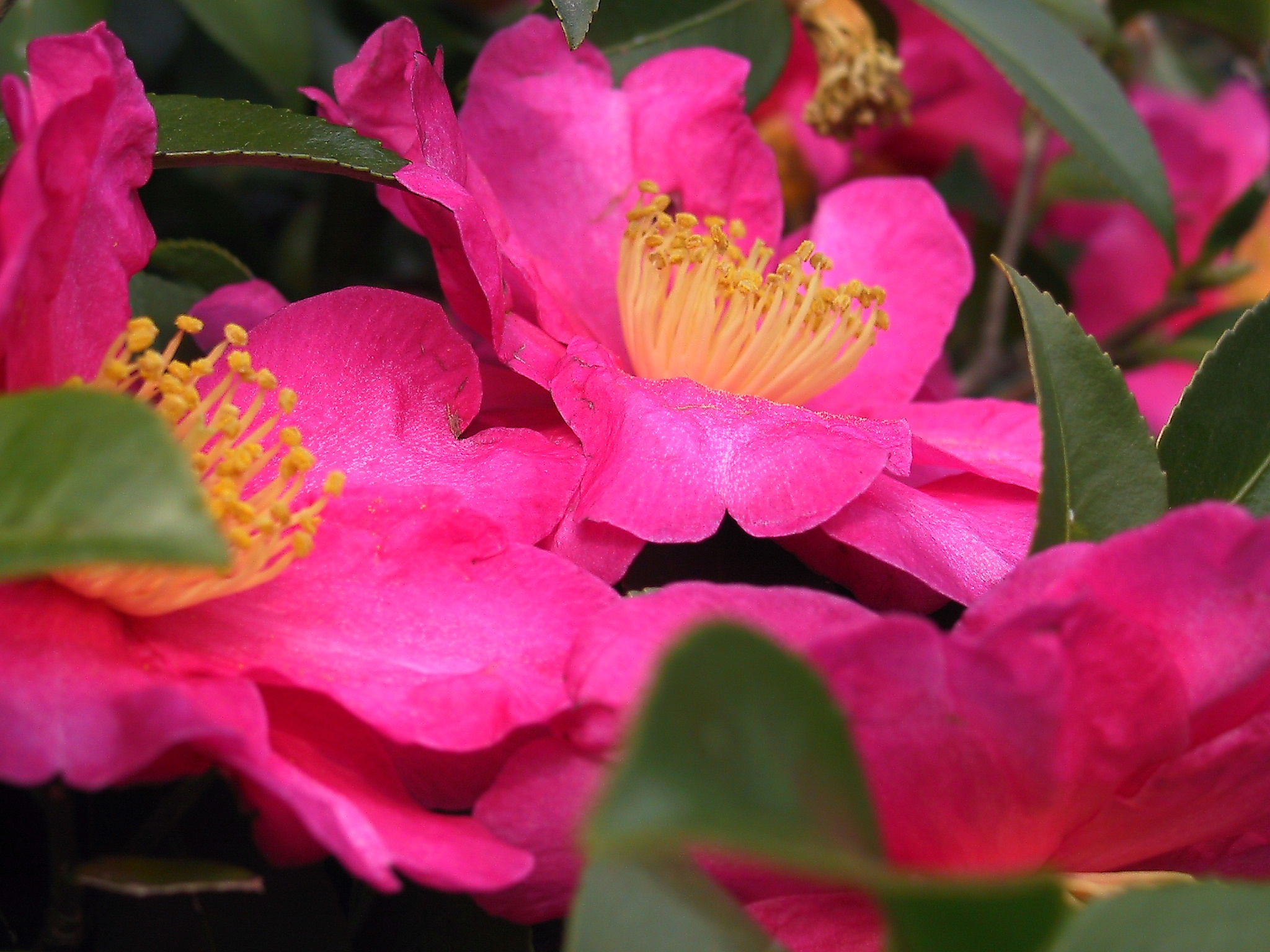
- Camellia sasanqua is used as a garden plant; its leaves are used for tea, and its seeds for oil.

Scientific classification
- Kingdom: Plantae
- Clade: Tracheophytes
- Clade: Angiosperms
- Clade: Eudicots
- Clade: Asterids
- Order: Ericales
- Family: Theaceae
- Genus: Camellia; L.

Type species
- Camellia japonica L.

Species
- About 187, see text

Synonyms
- List: Tsubaki Adans.; Sasanqua Nees; Calpandria Blume; Camelliastrum Nakai; Dankia Gagnep.; Desmitus Raf.; Drupifera Raf.; Piquetia Hallier f.; Salceda Blanco; Stereocarpus Hallier f.; Thea L.; Theaphylla Raf.; Theopsis (Cohen-Stuart) Nakai; Tsia Adans.; Yunnanea Hu

= Camellia =

Genus of flowering plants in the tea family

Camellia (/kəˈmɛliə/ or /kəˈmiːliə/) is a genus of flowering plants in the family Theaceae. They are found in tropical and subtropical areas in eastern and southern Asia, from the Himalayas east to Japan and Indonesia. There are more than 220 described species; almost all are found in southern China and Indochina. Camellias are popular ornamental, tea, and woody-oil plants cultivated worldwide for centuries. Over 26,000 cultivars, with more than 51,000 cultivar names, including synonyms, have been registered or published.

The leaves of C. sinensis are processed to create tea, and so are of particular economic importance in East Asia, Southeast Asia, and the Indian subcontinent, with the processed leaves widely sold and consumed globally. The ornamental C. japonica, C. sasanqua and their hybrids are the source of hundreds of garden cultivars. C. oleifera produces tea seed oil, used in cooking and cosmetics.

== Description ==
Flowering Camellia × intermedia

=== Vegetative characteristics ===
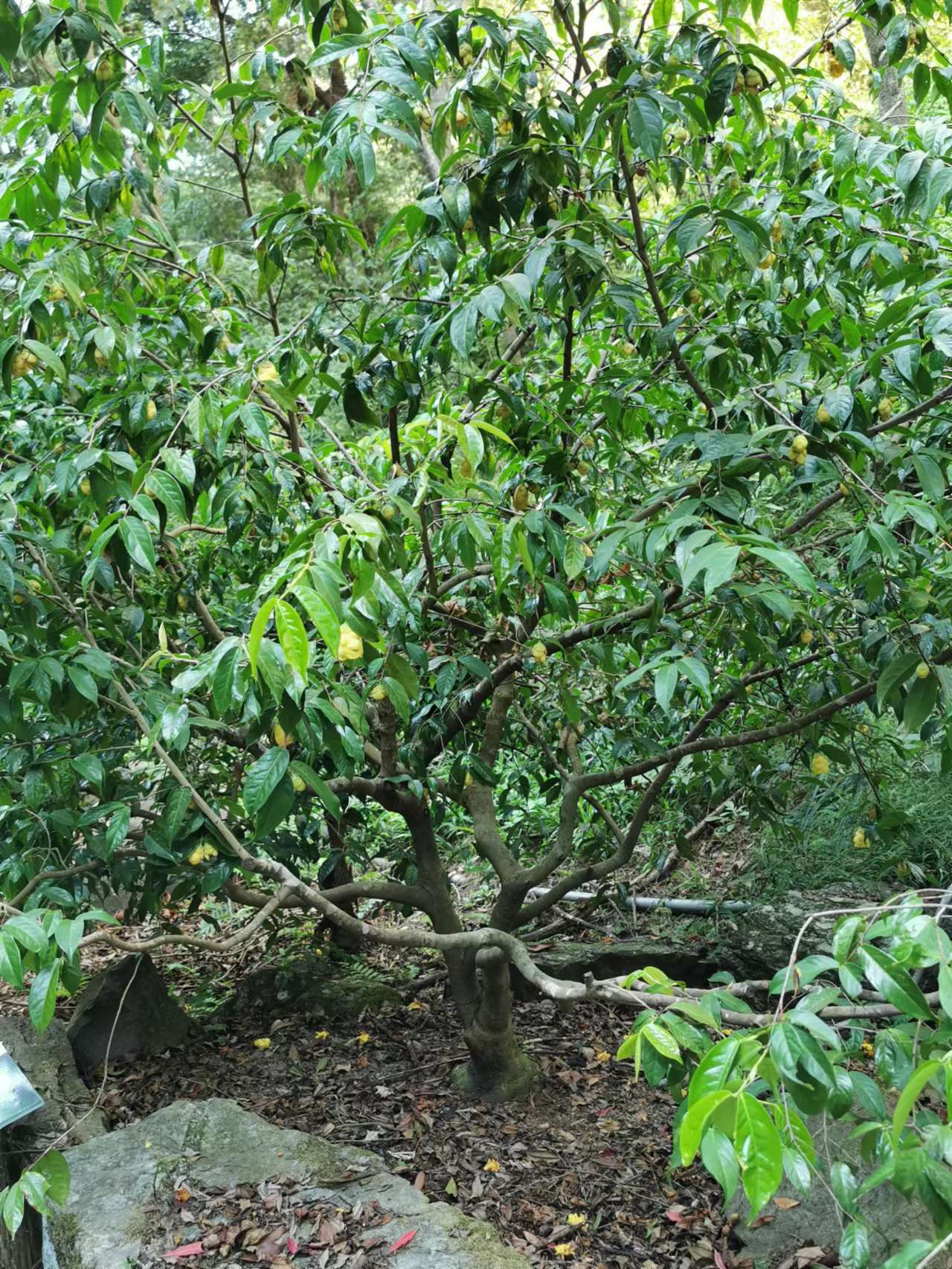
A small Camellia petelotii tree growing in Huisun, Taiwan

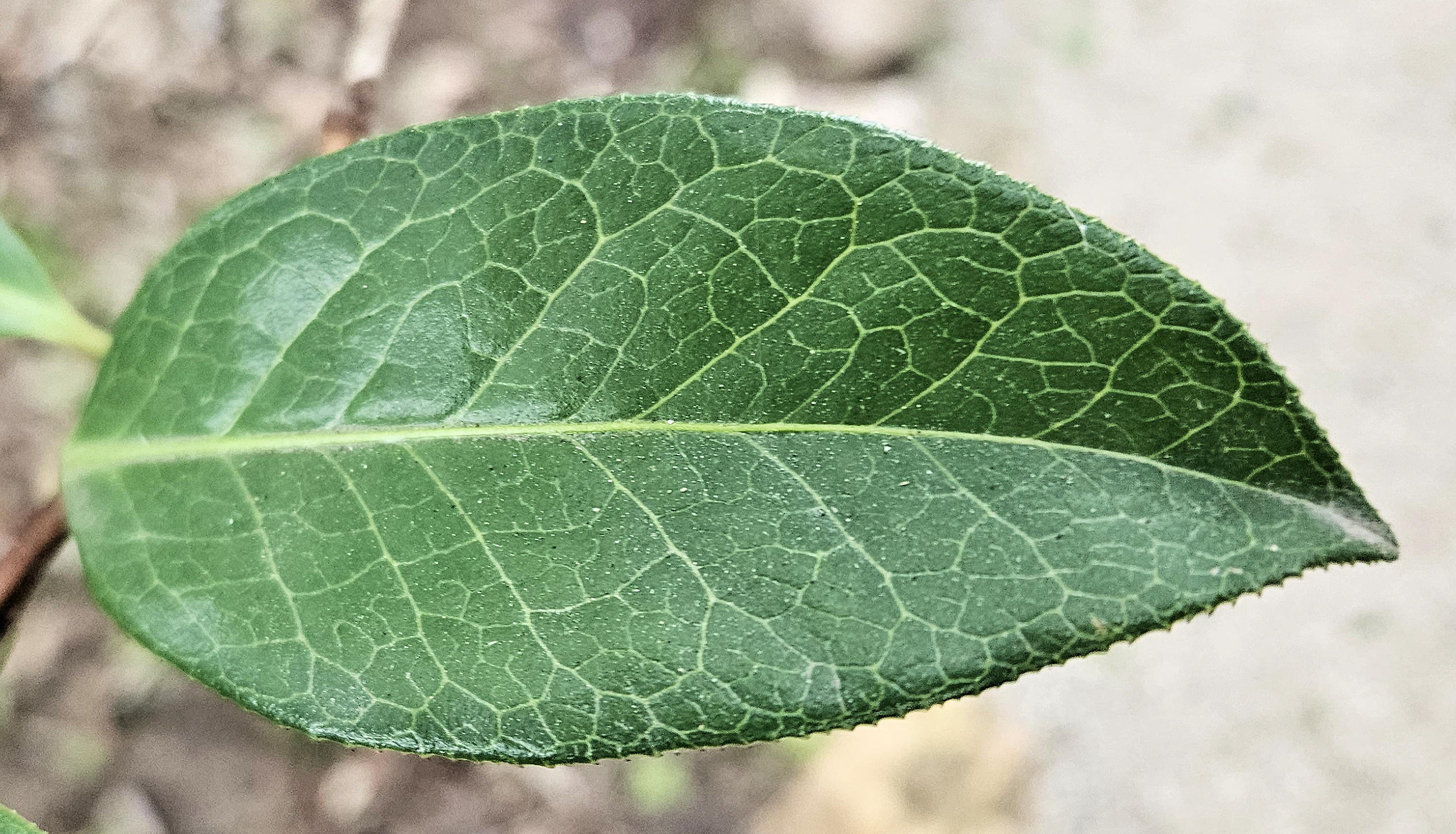
Leaf of Camellia reticulata

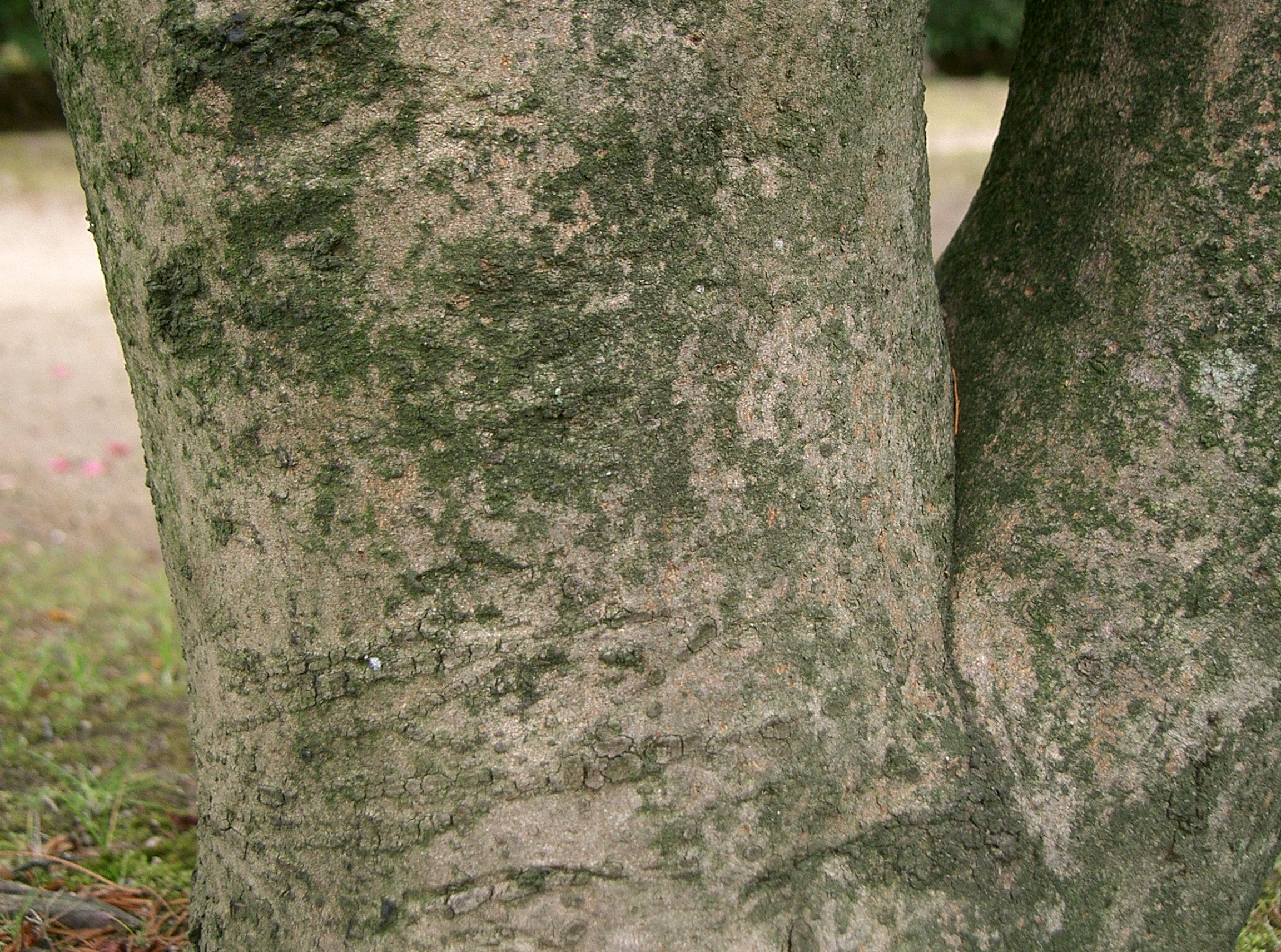
Bark of Camellia sasanqua

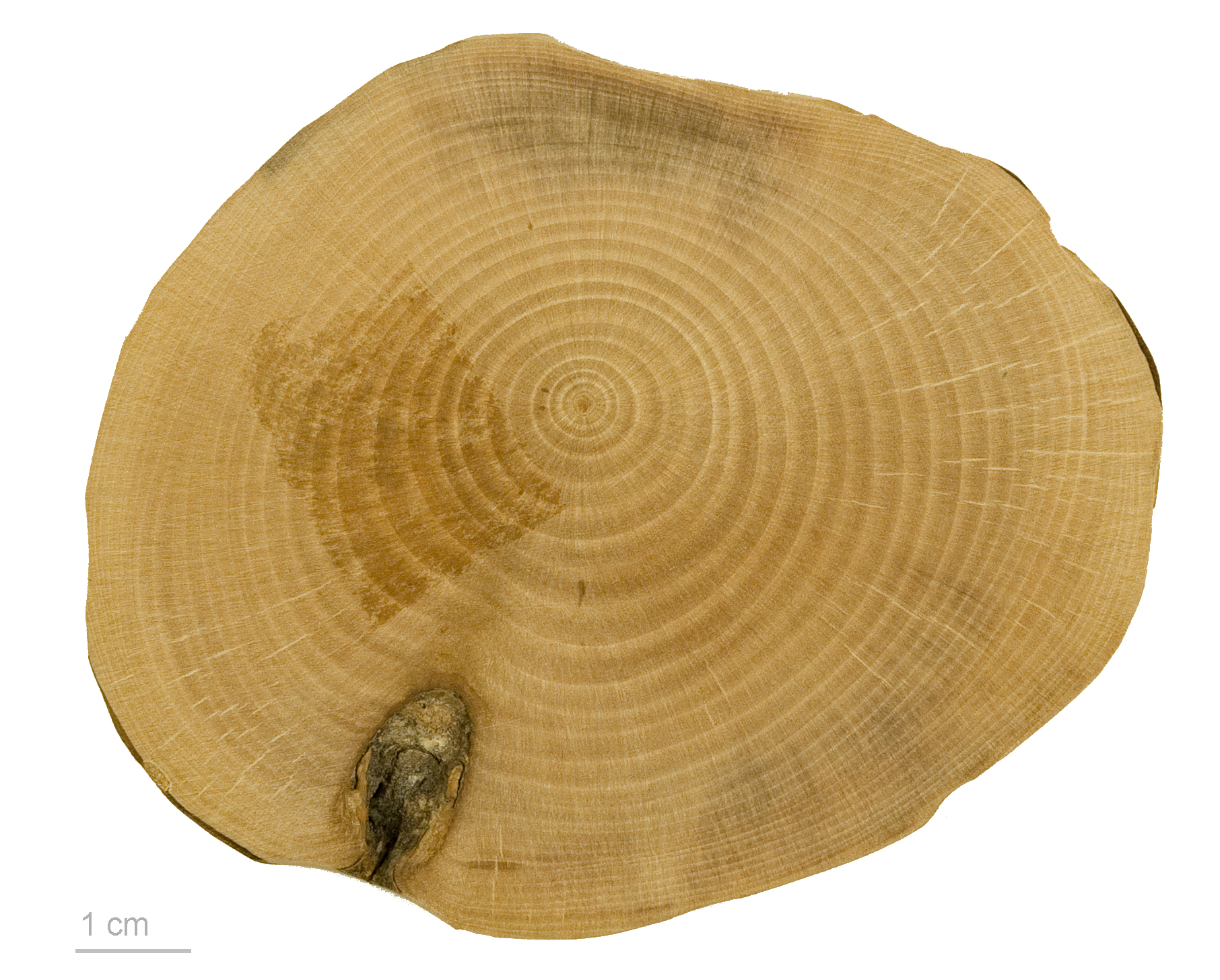
Wood cross section of Camellia japonica

Camellia are attractive, broad-leaved, evergreen, up to 10–15 m tall shrubs, small trees, or rarely large trees. The alternate, leathery leaves with serrate or rarely entire margins are petiolate or rarely sessile or amplexicaul.

=== Flowers and fruit ===
Flower of Camellia rosiflora

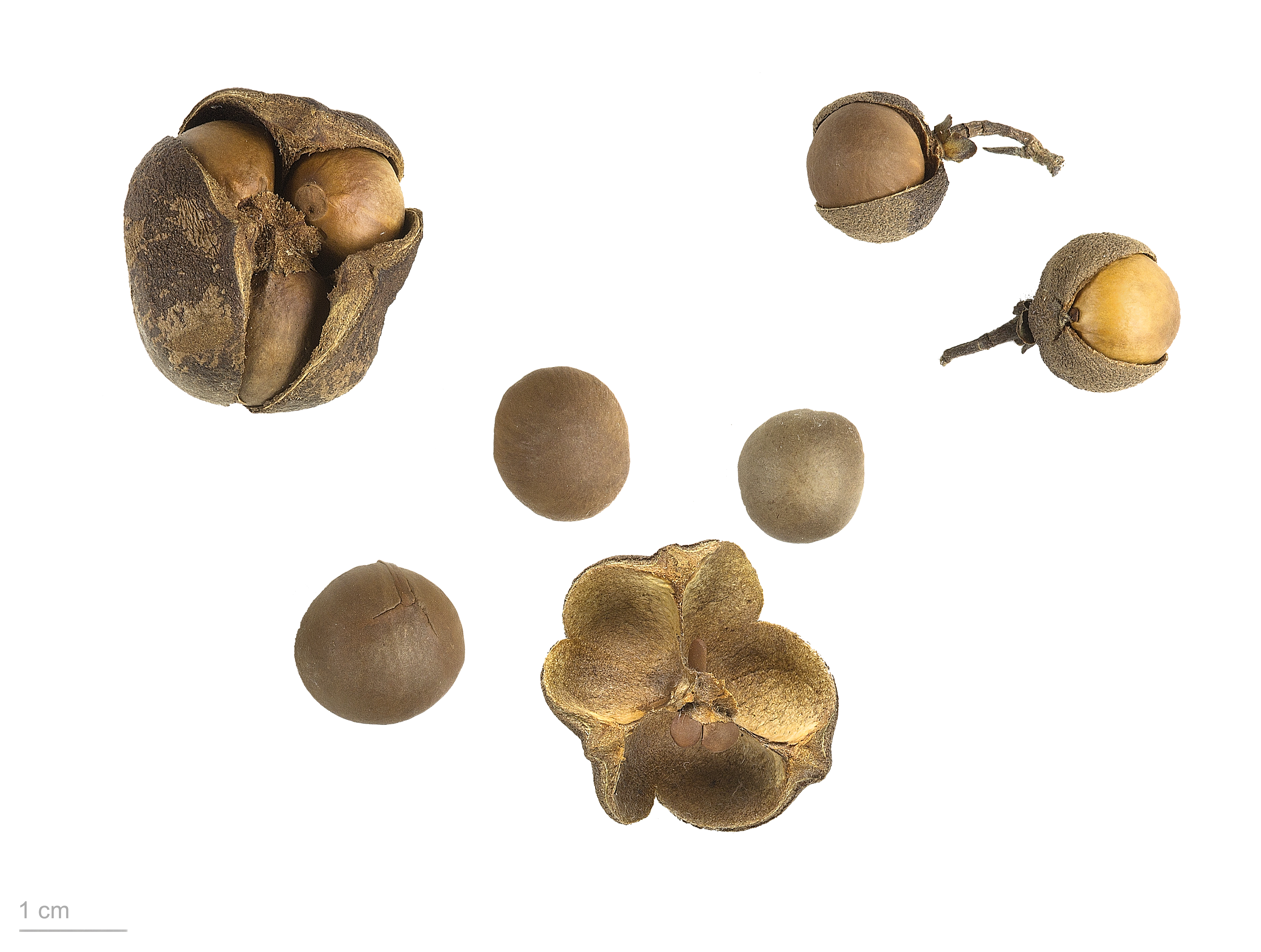
Capsule fruit and seeds of Camellia sinensis

The axillary or subterminal, solitary or grouped, large, hermaphrodite, fragrant or inodorous flowers are pedicellate or subsessile. Their flowers are usually conspicuous, one to 12 cm (5 in) in diameter, with five to nine petals in naturally occurring species of camellias. The colors of the flowers vary from white through pink colors to red; truly yellow flowers are found only in South China and Vietnam. Tea varieties are always white-flowered. Camellia flowers throughout the genus are characterized by a dense bouquet of conspicuous yellow stamens, often contrasting with the petal colors. Some research has shown that the colour of petals in some species' flowers indicate their size and how they are pollinated; species with red or yellow flowers are pollinated by sunbirds whereas species with white flowers are smaller in diameter and are pollinated by bees. The woody, 1-5-locular, globose or oblate, loculicidal capsule fruit with a persistent central axis bears semiglobose, globose, or polygonal, exalbuminous seeds.

== Taxonomy ==
The genus Camellia L. was described by Carl Linnaeus in 1753. It was named by Linnaeus after the Jesuit botanist Georg Joseph Kamel, who worked in the Philippines and described one of its species (although Linnaeus did not refer to Kamel's account when discussing the genus). The type species is Camellia japonica L. In 2022 the genus was separated into 7 sections based on phylogenetic study on 161 species. Further studies demonstrated that section Oleifera and Paracamellia should be merged into section Paracamellia. The following sections are currently recognized:

- Camellia sect. Camellia
- Camellia sect. Chrysantha
- Camellia sect. Longipedicellata
- Camellia sect. Longissima
- Camellia sect. Paracamellia
- Camellia sect. Thea
- Camellia sect. Tuberculata

=== Species ===
Plants of the World Online currently includes:

- Camellia albata Orel & Curry
- Camellia amplexicaulis (Pit.) Cohen-Stuart
- Camellia amplexifolia Merr. & Chun
- Camellia anlungensis Hung T.Chang
- Camellia assimiloides Sealy
- Camellia aurea Hung T.Chang
- Camellia azalea C.F.Wei
- Camellia brevistyla (Hayata) Cohen-Stuart
- Camellia bugiamapensis Orel, Curry, Luu & Q.D.Nguyen
- Camellia campanulata Orel, Curry & Luu
- Camellia candida Hung T.Chang
- Camellia capitata Orel, Curry & Luu
- Camellia cattienensis Orel
- Camellia caudata Wall.
- Camellia chekiangoleosa Hu
- Camellia cherryana Orel
- Camellia chinmeiae S.L.Lee & T.Y.A.Yang
- Camellia chrysanthoides Hung T.Chang
- Camellia concinna Orel & Curry
- Camellia connata (Craib) Craib
- Camellia corallina (Gagnep.) Sealy
- Camellia cordifolia (F.P.Metcalf) Nakai
- Camellia costata S.Y.Hu & S.Y.Liang
- Camellia costei H.Lév.
- Camellia crapnelliana Tutcher – Crapnell's camellia
- Camellia crassicolumna Hung T.Chang
- Camellia crassipes Sealy
- Camellia crassiphylla Ninh & Hakoda
- Camellia cuongiana Orel & Curry
- Camellia cupiformis T.L.Ming
- Camellia curryana Orel & Luu
- Camellia cuspidata (Kochs) Bean
- Camellia dalatensis V.D.Luong, Ninh & Hakoda
- Camellia debaoensis R.C.Hu & Y.Q.Liufu
- Camellia decora Orel, Curry & Luu
- Camellia dilinhensis Ninh & V.D.Luong
- Camellia dongnaicensis Orel
- Camellia dormoyana (Pierre ex Laness.) Sealy
- Camellia drupifera Lour.
- Camellia duyana Orel, Curry & Luu
- Camellia edithae Hance
- Camellia elizabethae Orel & Curry
- Camellia elongata (Rehder & E.H.Wilson) Rehder
- Camellia erubescens Orel & Curry
- Camellia euphlebia Merr. ex Sealy
- Camellia euryoides Lindl.
- Camellia fangchengensis S.Ye Liang & Y.C.Zhong
- Camellia fansipanensis J.M.H.Shaw, Wynn-Jones & V.D.Nguyen
- Camellia fascicularis Hung T.Chang
- Camellia flava (Pit.) Sealy
- Camellia flavida Hung T.Chang
- Camellia fleuryi (A.Chev.) Sealy
- Camellia fluviatilis Hand.-Mazz.
- Camellia forrestii (Diels) Cohen-Stuart
- Camellia fraterna Hance
- Camellia furfuracea (Merr.) Cohen-Stuart
- Camellia gaudichaudii (Gagnep.) Sealy
- Camellia gilbertii (A.Chev.) Sealy
- Camellia glabricostata T.L.Ming
- Camellia gracilipes Merr. ex Sealy
- Camellia grandibracteata Hung T.Chang, Y.J.Tan, F.L.Yu & P.S.Wang
- Camellia granthamiana Sealy – Grantham's camellia
- Camellia grijsii Hance
- Camellia gymnogyna Hung T.Chang
- Camellia harlandii Orel & Curry
- Camellia hatinhensis V.D.Luong, Ninh & L.T.Nguyen
- Camellia hekouensis C.J.Wang & G.S.Fan
- Camellia hiemalis Nakai
- Camellia honbaensis Luu, Q.D.Nguyen & G.Tran
- Camellia hongiaoensis Orel & Curry
- Camellia hongkongensis Seem.
- Camellia hsinpeiensis S.S.Ying
- Camellia huana T.L.Ming & W.J.Zhang
- Camellia ilicifolia Y.K.Li
- Camellia impressinervis Hung T.Chang & S.Ye Liang
- Camellia indochinensis Merr.
- Camellia ingens Orel & Curry
- Camellia insularis Orel & Curry
- Camellia × intermedia (Tuyama) Nagam.
- Camellia inusitata Orel, Curry & Luu
- Camellia japonica L. – East Asian camellia
  synonym Camellia rusticana – snow camellia
- Camellia kissii Wall.
- Camellia krempfii (Gagnep.) Sealy
- Camellia kwangsiensis Hung T.Chang
- Camellia lanceolata (Blume) Seem.
- Camellia langbianensis (Gagnep.) P.H.Hô
- Camellia laotica (Gagnep.) T.L.Ming
- Camellia lawii Sealy
- Camellia leptophylla S.Ye Liang ex Hung T.Chang
- Camellia ligustrina Orel, Curry & Luu
- Camellia longicalyx Hung T.Chang
- Camellia longii Orel & Luu
- Camellia longipedicellata (Hu) Hung T.Chang & D.Fang
- Camellia longissima Hung T.Chang & S.Ye Liang
- Camellia lucii Orel & Curry
- Camellia lutchuensis T.Itô
- Camellia luteocerata Orel
- Camellia luteoflora Y.K.Li ex Hung T.Chang & F.A.Zeng
- Camellia luteopallida V.D.Luong, T.Q.T.Nguyen & Luu
- Camellia luuana Orel & Curry
- Camellia maiana Orel
- Camellia mairei (H.Lév.) Melch.
- Camellia maoniushanensis J.L.Liu & Q.Luo
- Camellia megasepala Hung T.Chang & Trin Ninh
- Camellia melliana Hand.-Mazz.
- Camellia micrantha S.Ye Liang & Y.C.Zhong
- Camellia mileensis T.L.Ming
- Camellia mingii S.X.Yang
- Camellia minima Orel & Curry
- Camellia mollis Hung T.Chang & S.X.Ren
- Camellia montana (Blanco) Hung T.Chang & S.X.Ren
- Camellia murauchii Ninh & Hakoda
- Camellia namkadingensis Soulad. & Tagane
- Camellia nematodea (Gagnep.) Sealy
- Camellia nervosa (Gagnep.) Hung T.Chang
- Camellia oconoriana Orel, Curry & Luu
- Camellia oleifera C.Abel – oil-seed camellia, tea oil camellia
- Camellia pachyandra Hu
- Camellia parviflora Merr. & Chun ex Sealy
- Camellia parvimuricata Hung T.Chang
- Camellia paucipunctata (Merr. & Chun) Chun
- Camellia petelotii (Merr.) Sealy synonyms:
  C. chrysantha, C. nitidissima – yellow camellia
- Camellia philippinensis Hung T.Chang & S.X.Ren
- Camellia pilosperma S.Yun Liang
- Camellia pingguoensis D.Fang
- Camellia piquetiana (Pierre) Sealy
- Camellia pitardii Cohen-Stuart
- Camellia pleurocarpa (Gagnep.) Sealy
- Camellia polyodonta F.C.How ex Hu
- Camellia psilocarpa X.G.Shi & C.X.Ye
- Camellia ptilophylla Hung T.Chang
- Camellia pubicosta Merr.
- Camellia pubifurfuracea Y.C.Zhong
- Camellia pubipetala Y.Wan & S.Z.Huang
- Camellia pukhangensis N.D.Do, V.D.Luong, S.T.Hoang & T.H.Lê
- Camellia punctata (Kochs) Cohen-Stuart
- Camellia pyriparva Orel & Curry
- Camellia pyxidiacea Z.R.Xu, F.P.Chen & C.Y.Deng
- Camellia quangcuongii L.V.Dung, S.T. Hoang & Nhan
- Camellia reflexa Orel & Curry
- Camellia renshanxiangiae C.X.Ye & X.Q.Zheng
- Camellia reticulata Lindl.
- Camellia rhytidocarpa Hung T.Chang & S.Ye Liang
- Camellia rosacea Tagane, Soulad. & Yahara
- Camellia rosiflora Hook.
- Camellia rosmannii Ninh
- Camellia rosthorniana Hand.-Mazz.
- Camellia rubriflora Ninh & Hakoda
- Camellia salicifolia Champ.
- Camellia saluenensis Stapf ex Bean
- Camellia sasanqua Thunb.
- Camellia scabrosa Orel & Curry
- Camellia sealyana T.L.Ming
- Camellia semiserrata C.W.Chi
- Camellia septempetala Hung T.Chang & L.L.Qi
- Camellia siangensis T.K.Paul & M.P.Nayar
- Camellia sinensis (L.) Kuntze – tea plant
- Camellia sonthaiensis Luu, V.D.Luong, Q.D.Nguyen & T.Q.T.Nguyen
- Camellia stuartiana Sealy
- Camellia subintegra P.C.Huang
- Camellia synaptica Sealy
- Camellia szechuanensis C.W.Chi
- Camellia szemaoensis Hung T.Chang
- Camellia tachangensis F.S.Zhang
- Camellia tadungensis Orel, Curry & Luu
- Camellia taliensis (W.W.Sm.) Melch. – also used to make tea like C. sinensis
- Camellia tenii Sealy
- Camellia thailandica Hung T.Chang & S.X.Ren
- Camellia thanxaensa Hakoda & Kirino
- Camellia tienyenensis Orel & Curry
- Camellia tomentosa Orel & Curry
- Camellia tonkinensis (Pit.) Cohen-Stuart
- Camellia transarisanensis (Hayata) Cohen-Stuart
- Camellia trichoclada (Rehder) S.S.Chien
- Camellia tsaii Hu
- Camellia tsingpienensis Hu
- Camellia tuberculata S.S.Chien
- Camellia tuyenquangensis V.D.Luong, Le & Ninh
- Camellia uraku Kitam.
- Camellia villicarpa S.S.Chien
- Camellia viridicalyx Hung T.Chang & S.Ye Liang
- Camellia viscosa Orel & Curry
- Camellia vuquangensis V.D.Luong, Ninh & L.T.Nguyen
- Camellia wardii Kobuski
- Camellia xanthochroma K.M.Feng & L.S.Xie
- Camellia yokdonensis Dung bis & Hakoda
- Camellia yunkiangica Hung T.Chang, H.S.Wang & B.H.Chen
- Camellia yunnanensis (Pit. ex Diels) Cohen-Stuart
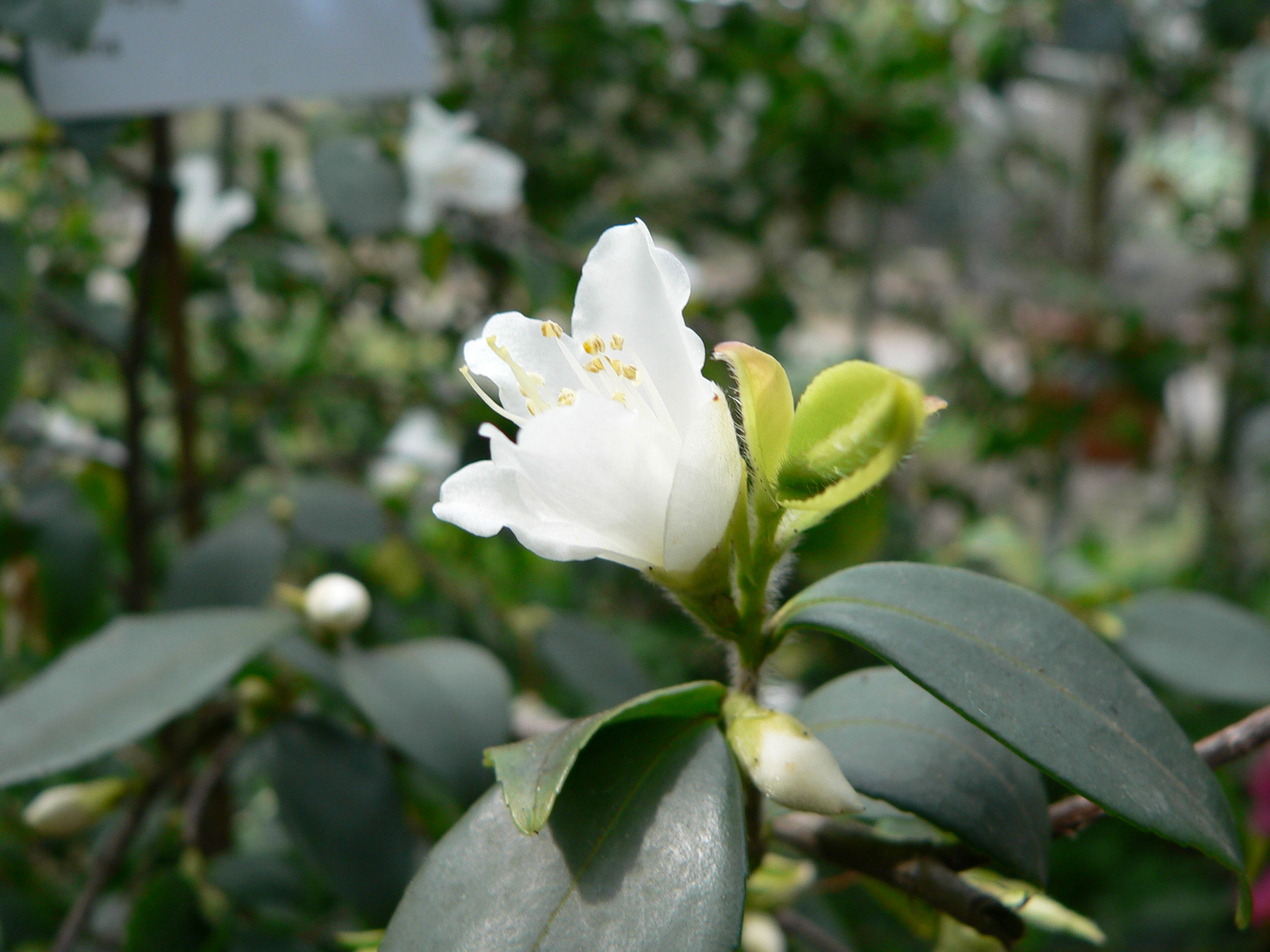
Camellia fraterna

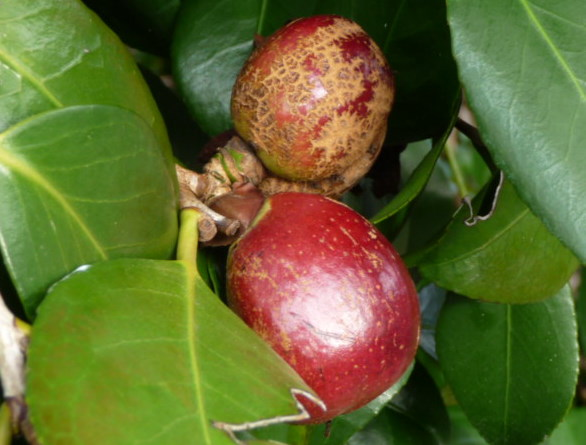
Fruits of an unspecified Camellia

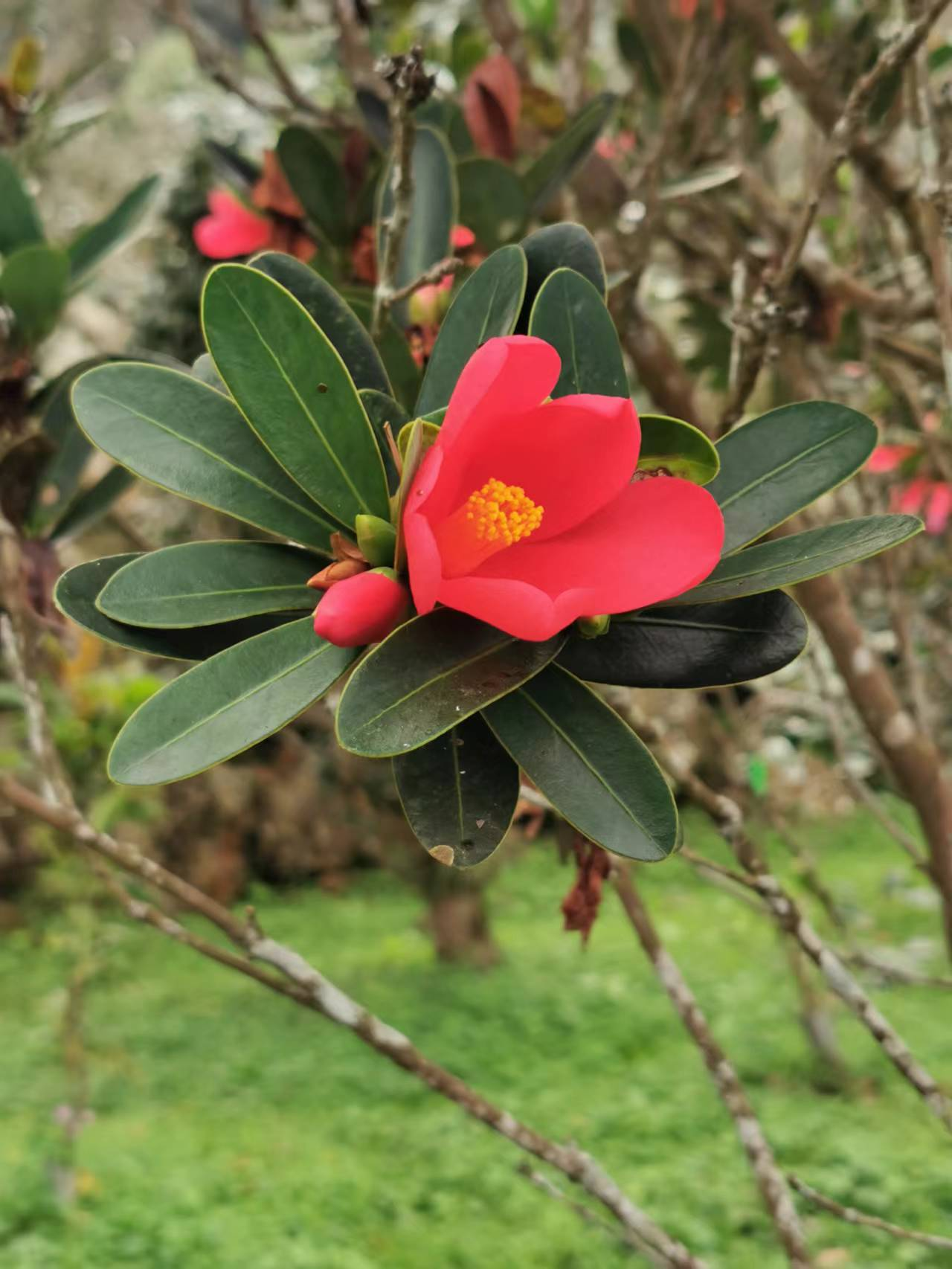
Camellia azalea

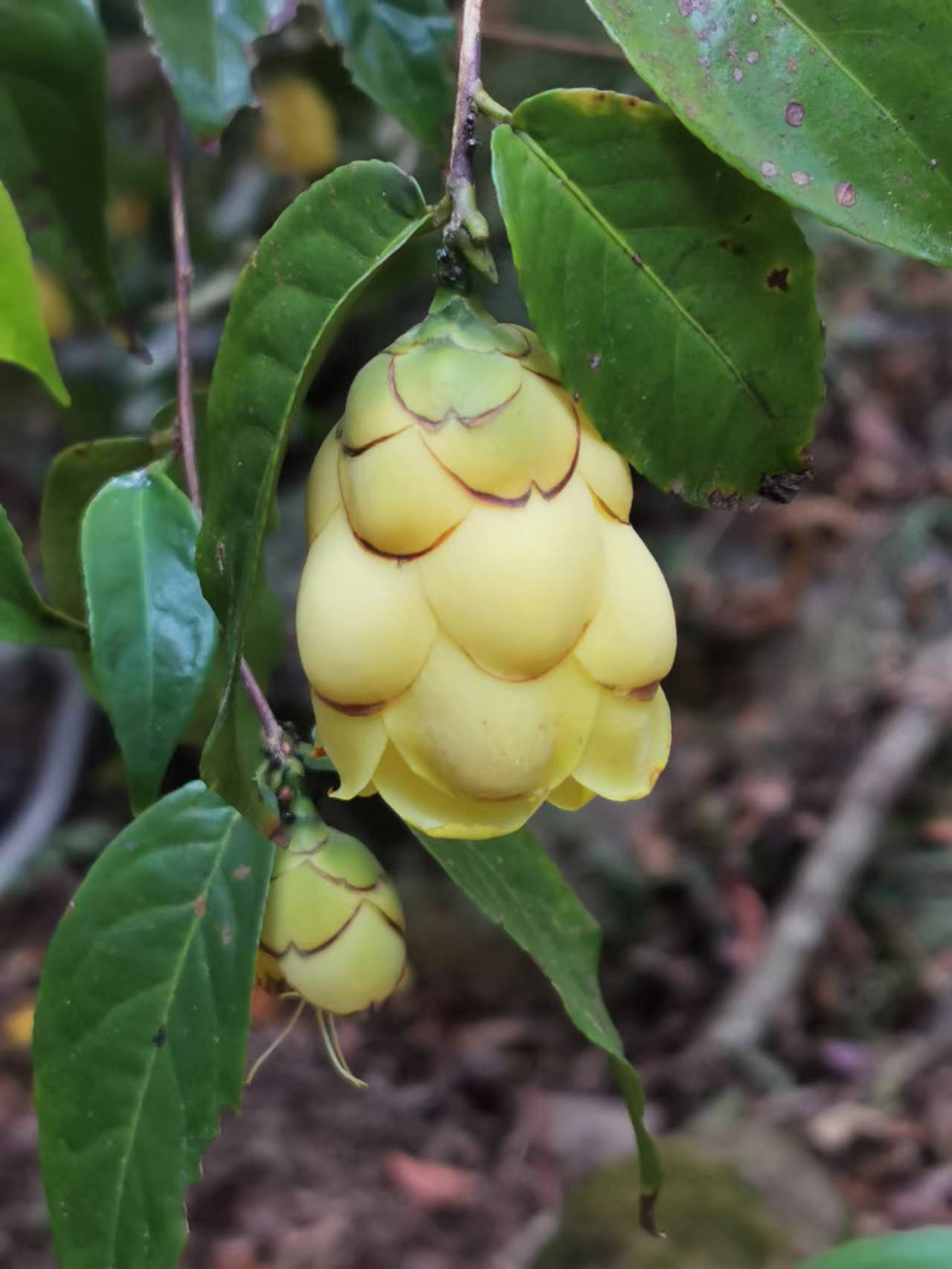
Camellia petelotii

=== Fossil record ===
The earliest fossil record of Camellia are the leaves of †C. abensis from the upper Eocene of Japan, †C. abchasica from the lower Oligocene of Bulgaria and †C. multiforma from the lower Oligocene of Washington, United States.

== Distribution and habitat ==
Species of Camellia occur in the moist or dry, temperate to tropical forests of Bangladesh, Bhutan, Borneo, Cambodia, China, East Himalaya, Hainan, India, Japan, Korea, Laos, Lesser Sunda Is., Myanmar, Nansei-shoto, Nepal, Philippines, Sri Lanka, Sulawesi, Taiwan, Thailand, Tibet, and Vietnam at elevations of 0–3200 m above sea level. In deforested areas, Camellia may persist as shrubs in meadows and pastures.

== Ecology ==
Camellia plants are used as food plants by the larvae of some Lepidoptera species. Leaves of Camellia japonica are susceptible to the fungal parasite Mycelia sterile (see below for the significance), mycelia sterile PF1022 produces a metabolite named PF1022A that is used to produce emodepside, an anthelmintic drug.

== Conservation ==
Camellia amplexicaulis is extinct in the wild.

There are many Camellia species that are threatened with extinction. One species, Camellia amplexicaulis, is already extinct in the wild. There are also many critically endangered (CR), endangered (EN), or vulnerable (VU) species and many threatened Camellia species are not present in ex situ conservation collections.

== Cultivation ==
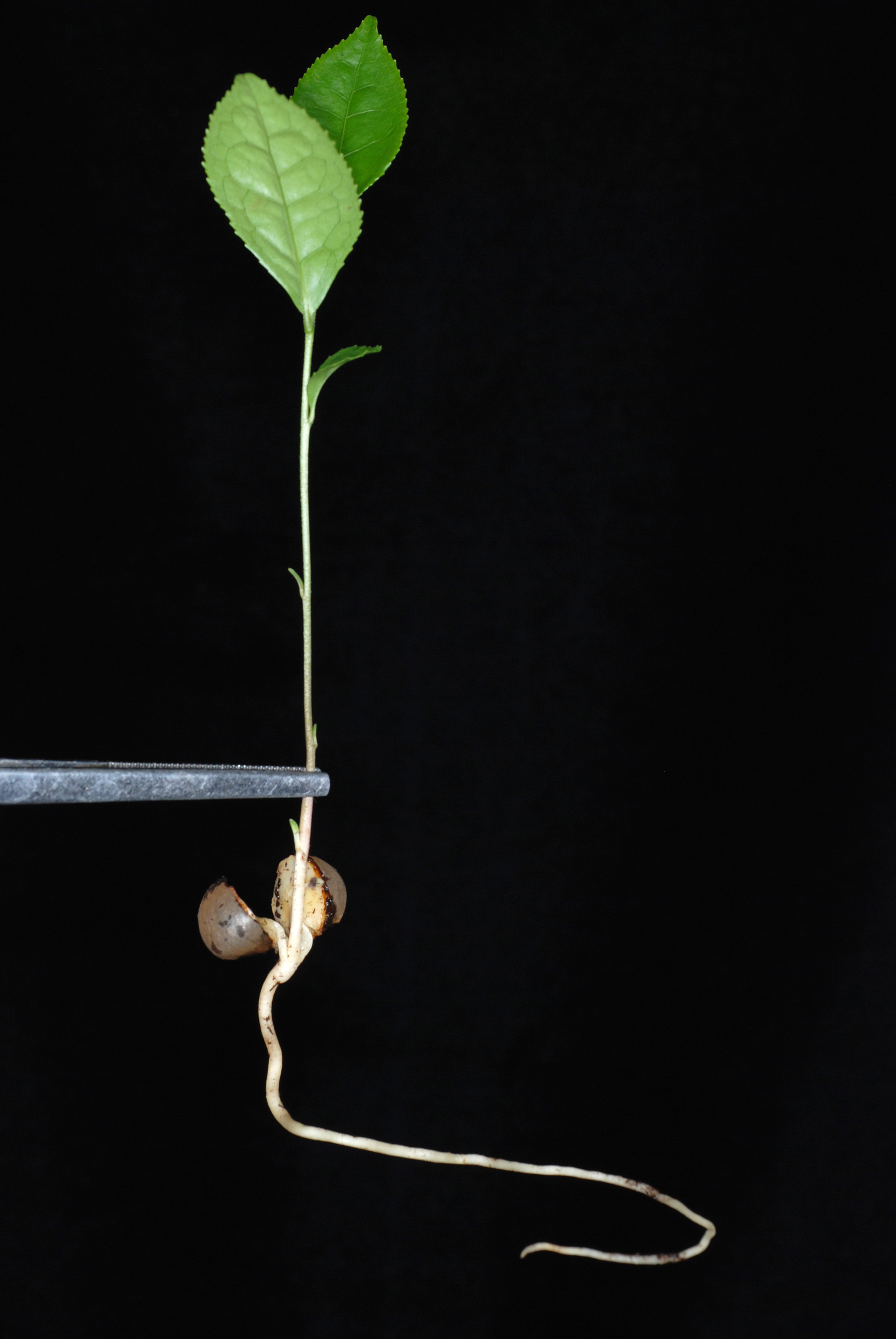
Seedling of Camellia sinensis

The various species of Camellia plants are generally well-adapted to acid soils rich in humus, and most species do not grow well on chalky soil or other calcium-rich soils. Most species of camellias also require a large amount of water, either from natural rainfall or from irrigation, and the plants will not tolerate droughts. However, some of the more unusual camellias – typically species from karst soils in Vietnam – can grow without too much water.

Camellia plants are generally considered slow growing. This slow growth rate makes them well-suited for growing in pots or tubs, and they don't require frequent pruning. While some varieties may grow more quickly than others, particularly when young, the overall growth rate of most camellias is relatively slow. Typically, they will grow about 30 cm (12 in) per year until mature – however, this varies depending on their variety and geographical location.

== History and use ==
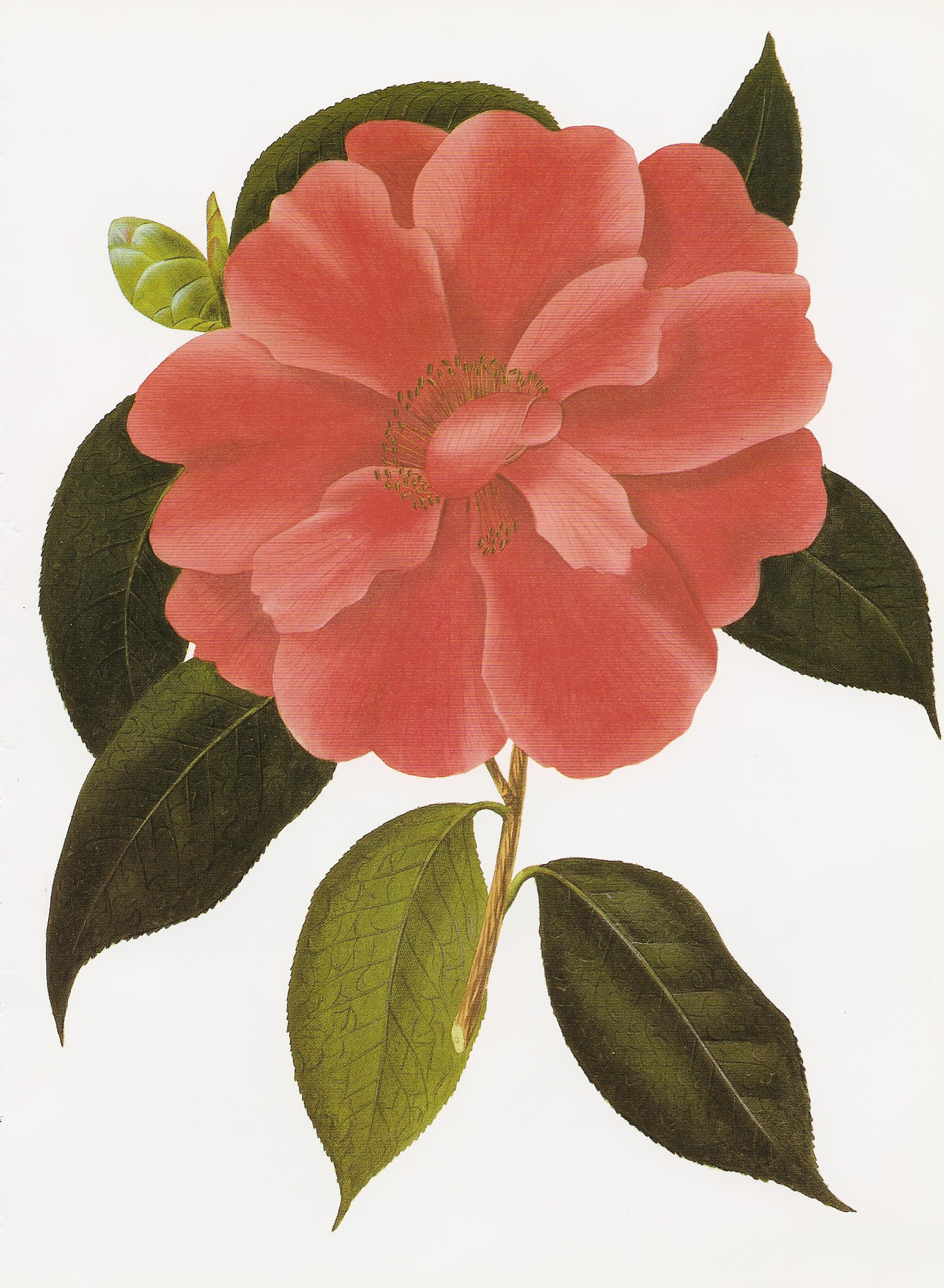
Camellia reticulata is rare in the wild but has been cultivated for hundreds of years.

Camellia sinensis, the tea plant, is of major commercial importance because tea is made from its leaves. The species C. sinensis is the product of many generations of selective breeding to bring out desirable qualities for tea. However, many other camellias can be used to produce a similar beverage. For example, tea made from C. sasanqua leaves is popular in some parts of Japan.

Seeds of C. oleifera, C. japonica, and, to a lesser extent, other species such as C. crapnelliana, C. reticulata, C. sasanqua and C. sinensis as well are pressed to make tea seed oil, a sweet seasoning and cooking oil special to East Asia. It is the most important cooking oil for hundreds of millions of people, particularly in southern China.

Camellia oil is commonly used to clean and protect the blades of cutting instruments.

Camellia oil pressed from seeds of C. japonica, also called tsubaki oil or tsubaki-abura (椿油) in Japanese, has been traditionally used in Japan for hair care. C. japonica plant is used to prepare traditional anti-inflammatory medicines.

=== Garden history ===
Camellias were cultivated in the gardens of China for centuries before they were seen in Europe. The German botanist Engelbert Kaempfer reported that the "Japan Rose", as he called it, grew wild in woodland and hedgerow, but that many superior varieties had been selected for gardens. Europeans' earliest views of camellias must have been their representations in Chinese painted wallpapers, where they were often represented growing in porcelain pots.

The first living camellias seen in England were a single red and a single white, grown and flowered in his garden at Thorndon Hall, Essex, by Robert James, Lord Petre, among the keenest gardeners of his generation, in 1739. His gardener James Gordon was the first to introduce camellias to commerce, from the nurseries he established after Lord Petre's untimely death in 1743, at Mile End, Essex, near London.

With the expansion of the tea trade in the later 18th century, new varieties began to be seen in England, imported through the British East India Company. The company's John Slater was responsible for the first of the new camellias, double ones, in white and a striped red, imported in 1792. Further camellias imported in the East Indiamen were associated with the patrons whose gardeners grew them: a double red for Sir Robert Preston in 1794 and the pale pink named "Lady Hume's Blush" for Amelia, the lady of Sir Abraham Hume of Wormleybury, Hertfordshire (1806). The camellia was imported from England to America in 1797 when Colonel John Stevens brought the flower as part of an effort to grow attractions within Elysian Fields in Hoboken, New Jersey. By 1819, twenty-five camellias had bloomed in England; that year the first monograph appeared, Samuel Curtis's, A Monograph on the Genus Camellia, whose five handsome folio colored illustrations have usually been removed from the slender text and framed. Though they did not flower for over a decade, camellias that set seed rewarded their growers with a wealth of new varieties. By the 1840s, the camellia was at the height of its fashion as the luxury flower. The Parisian courtesan Marie Duplessis, who died young in 1847, inspired Dumas' La Dame aux camélias and Verdi's La Traviata.

The fashionable imbricated formality of prized camellias was an element in their decline, replaced by the new hothouse orchid. Their revival after World War I as woodland shrubs for mild climates has been paralleled by the rise in popularity of Camellia sasanqua.

=== Modern cultivars ===
The tea camellia, C. sinensis, has been selected by many commercial cultivars for the taste of its leaves once processed into tea leaves.

Today, camellias are grown as ornamental plants for their flowers; about 3,000 cultivars and hybrids have been selected, many with double or semi-double flowers. C. japonica is the most prominent species in cultivation, with over 2,000 named cultivars. Next are C. reticulata with over 400 named cultivars, and C. sasanqua with over 300 named cultivars. Popular hybrids include C. × hiemalis (C. japonica × C. sasanqua) and C. × williamsii (C. japonica × C. saluenensis). Some varieties can grow considerably, up to 100 m^{2}, though more compact cultivars are available. They are frequently planted in woodland settings alongside other calcifuges, such as rhododendrons. They are particularly associated with areas of high soil acidity, such as Cornwall and Devon in the UK. They are highly valued for their very early flowering, often among the first flowers to appear in the late winter. Late frosts can damage the flower buds, resulting in misshapen flowers.

There is a great variety of flower forms:

- single (flat, bowl- or cup-shaped)
- semi-double (rows of large outer petals, with the centre comprising mixed petals and stamens)
- double:
  - peony form (convex mass of irregular petals and petaloids with hidden stamens)
  - anemone form (one or more rows of outer petals, with mixed petaloids and stamens in the centre)
  - rose form (overlapping petals showing stamens in a concave centre when open)
  - formal double (rows of overlapping petals with hidden stamens)

==== AGM cultivars ====
The following hybrid cultivars have gained the Royal Horticultural Society's Award of Garden Merit:

Name	Parentage	Height	Spread	Flower colour	Flower type	Ref.
Cornish Snow	cuspidata × saluenensis	2.5	1.5	white	single	
Cornish Spring	cuspidata × japonica	2.5	1.5	pink	single	
Francie L		8.0	8.0	rose-pink	double	
Freedom Bell	× williamsii	2.5	2.5	red	semi-double	
Inspiration	reticulata × saluenensis	4.0	2.5	rose-pink	semi-double	
Leonard Messel	reticulata × × williamsii	4.0	4.0	rose-pink	semi-double	
Royalty	japonica × reticulata	1.0	1.0	light red	semi-double	
Spring Festival	× williamsii, cuspidata	4.0	2.5	pink	semi-double	
Tom Knudsen	japonica × reticulata	2.5	2.5	deep red	double paeony	
Tristrem Carlyon	reticulata	4.0	2.5	rose pink	double paeony	

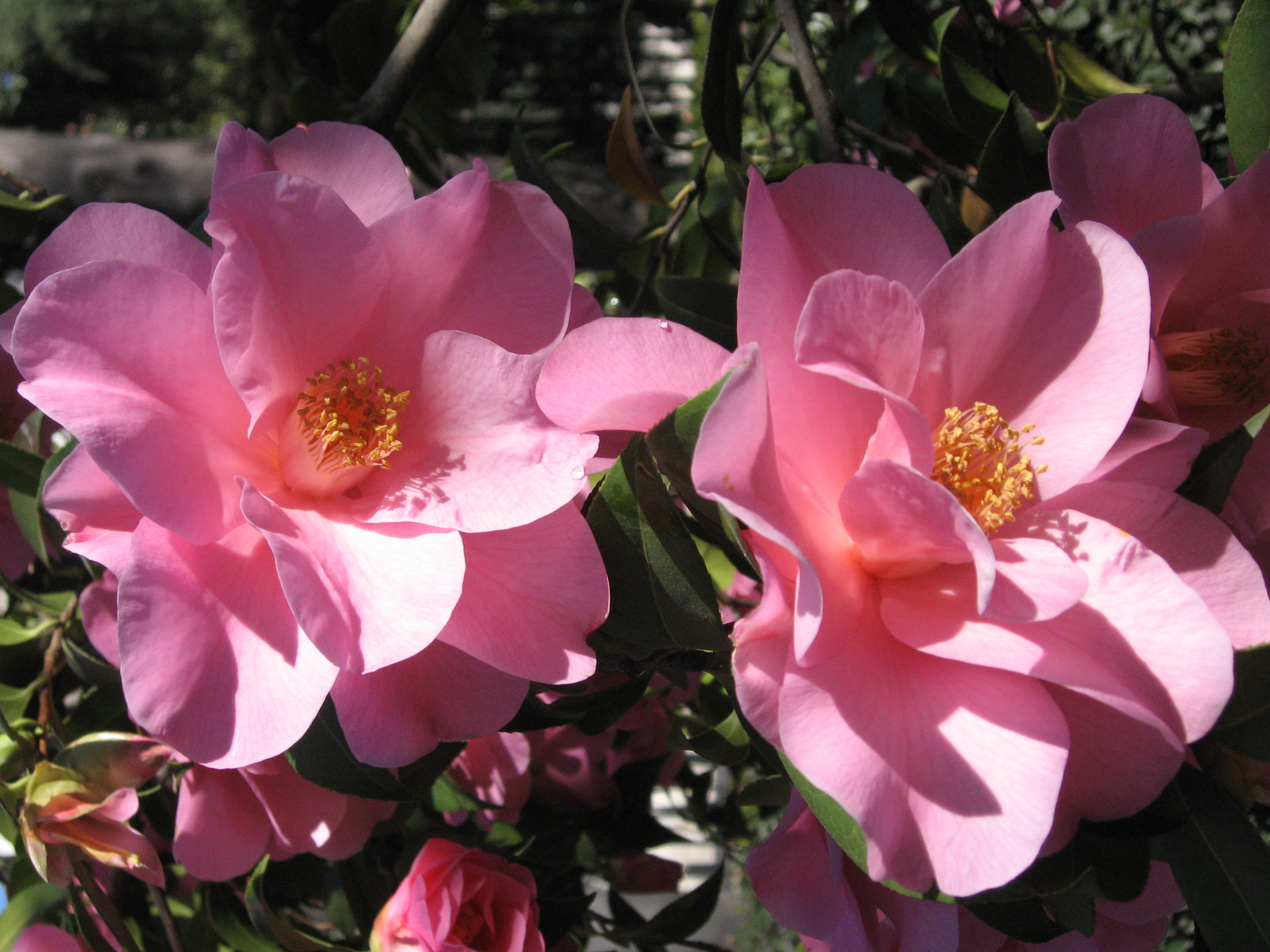
Simple-flowered Camellia × williamsii 'Brigadoon'

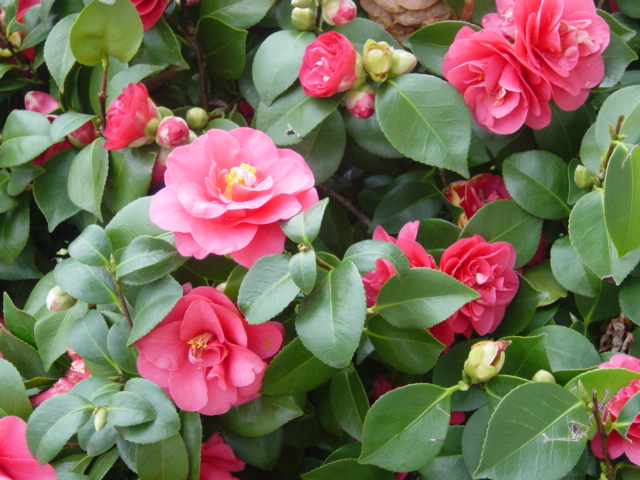
Semi-double-flowered Camellia cultivar

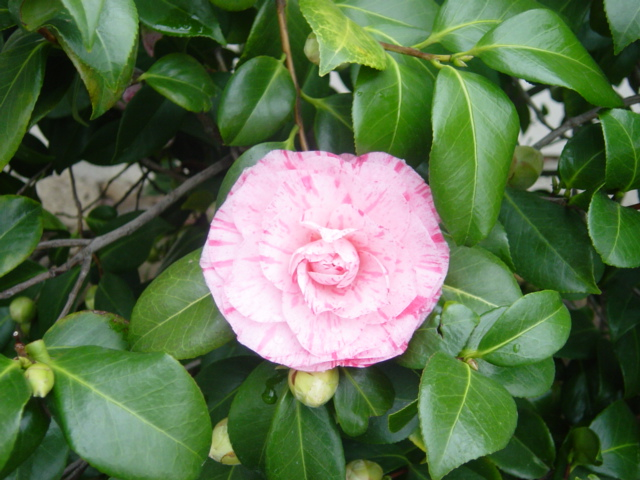
Double-flowered Camellia cultivar

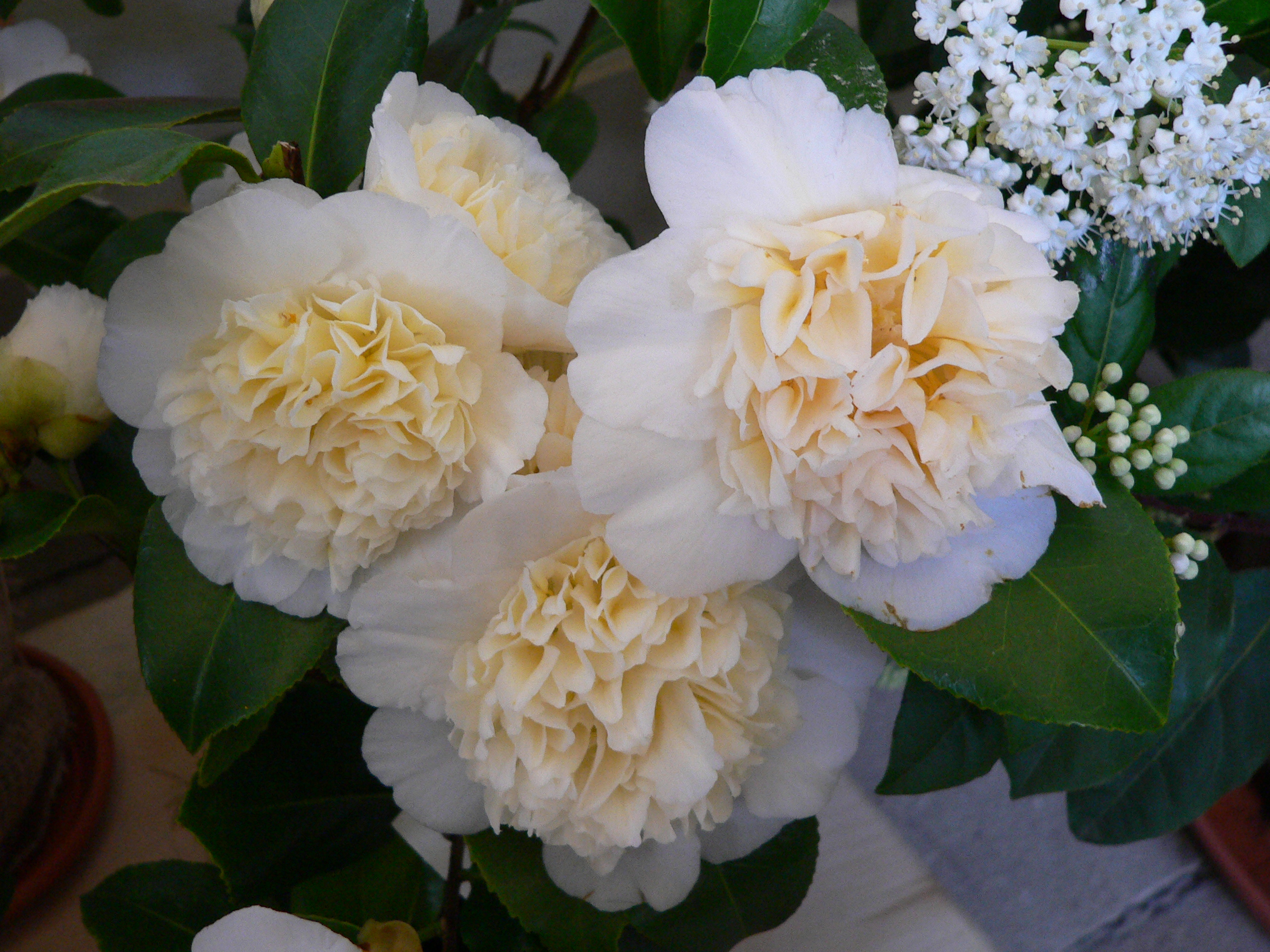
Double-flowered hybrid Camellia 'Jury's Yellow'

== Cultural significance ==
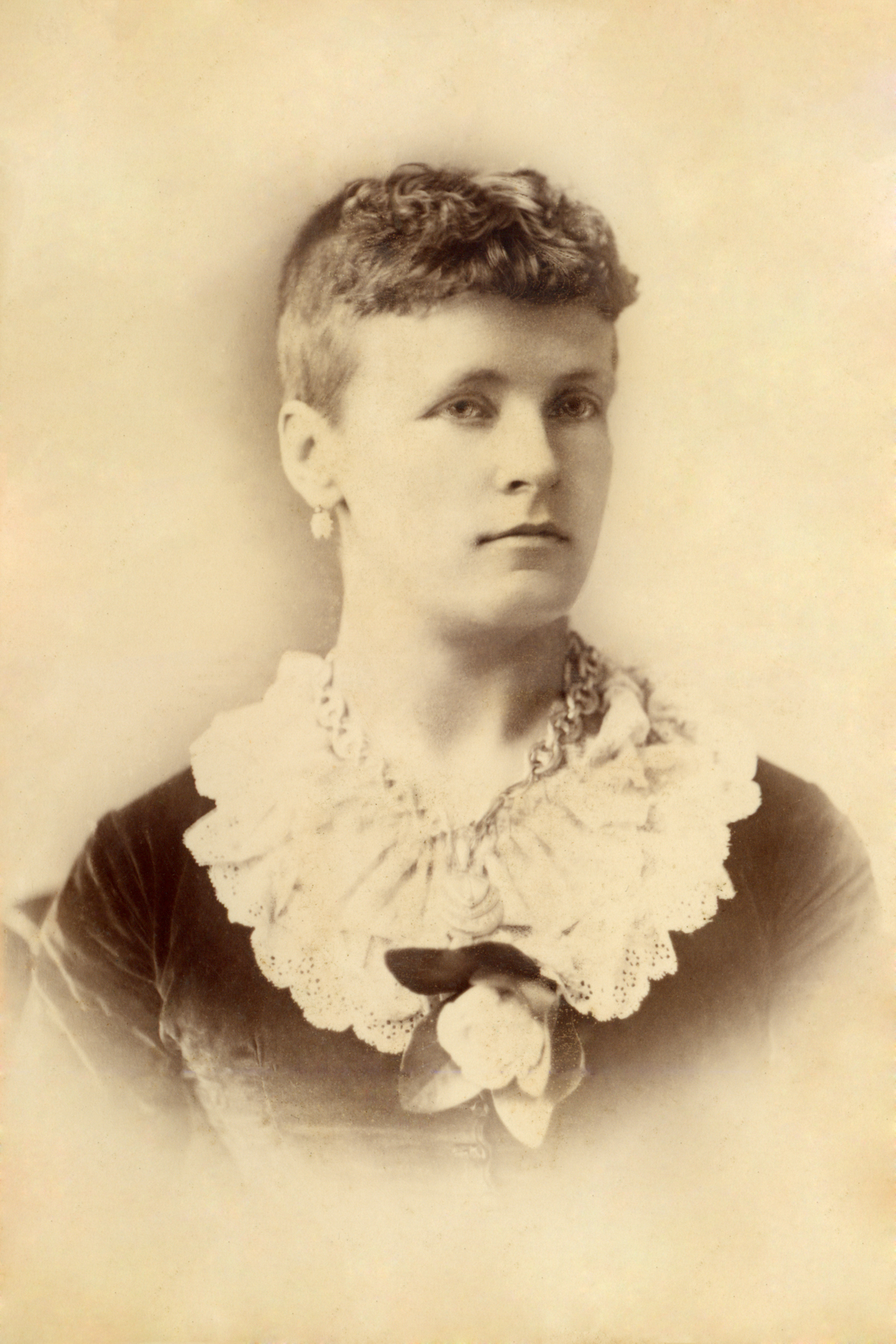
Portrait of a New Zealand suffragette, c. 1880. The sitter wears a white camellia, symbolic of support for advancing women's rights.

The Camellia family of plants in popular culture.

- The following cities are nicknamed the "Camellia City" of each state: Greenville, Alabama; Sacramento, California; Fort Walton Beach, Florida; Slidell, Louisiana; McComb, Mississippi; and Newberg, Oregon. Meanwhile, Thomson, Georgia, is nicknamed the "Camellia City of the South".
- The camellia is the state flower of Alabama.
- A postseason college football bowl game introduced in 2014 in Montgomery, Alabama, was first known as the Camellia Bowl.
- Alexandre Dumas fils wrote the novel and stage adaptation The Lady of the Camellias, wherein the flower is a symbol of a courtesan's sexual availability.
- Augusta National Golf Club's 10th hole is named "Camellia", one of many references to the plant nursery originally on the site of the course.
- Rabindranath Tagore wrote a poem titled "Camellia" about a youth's longing for a young woman he sees on the train.
- In the book To Kill a Mockingbird, Jem destroys Mrs. Dubose's camellia bushes after she insults his family, yet he later receives a camellia bud from the dying woman.
- A white Camellia flower is an iconic symbol of Chanel haute couture, a tradition started by Coco Chanel herself, who identified with the heroine of Dumas's work.
- Camellias have major significance in the Akira Kurosawa film Sanjuro, likely due to their association with the concept of "a noble death" in samurai culture.
- White camellias are a symbol of the women's suffrage movement in New Zealand and appear on the country's ten-dollar note.
- The Knights of the White Camelia was an organization similar to the Ku Klux Klan.
- Since 1944 the slogan of Temple City, California, has been "Temple City, Home of Camellias", and the city has become well known for its Camellia Festival.
- In Brazil, the Camellia was a symbol of abolitionist movement during the Imperial Age. It was common practice for abolitionists to plant camellias in solidarity.
- An Argentinian military march is called "Avenida de las Camelias".
- In the videogame Wuthering Waves, the character Camellya is a reference to this flower genus.

== See also ==
- List of Award of Garden Merit camellias
