= Camellia fleuryi =

Conservation status
- Endangered (IUCN 3.1)

Scientific classification
- Kingdom: Plantae
- Clade: Tracheophytes
- Clade: Angiosperms
- Clade: Eudicots
- Clade: Asterids
- Order: Ericales
- Family: Theaceae
- Genus: Camellia
- Species: C. fleuryi

Binomial name
- Camellia fleuryi (A.Chev.) Sealy

Synonyms
- Thea fleuryi A.Chev.

Species of tree

Camellia fleuryi is a species of plant in the family Theaceae. It is endemic to Vietnam.
