= Camellia pubicosta =

Scientific classification
- Kingdom: Plantae
- Clade: Tracheophytes
- Clade: Angiosperms
- Clade: Eudicots
- Clade: Asterids
- Order: Ericales
- Family: Theaceae
- Genus: Camellia
- Species: C. pubicosta

Binomial name
- Camellia pubicosta Merr.

Species of plant

Camellia pubicosta is a species of flowering plant in the Theaceae family. It is mainly cultivated in Vietnam. It is shrubby plant. Its height is 8–10 meters.

== See also ==
- Camellia sinensis
