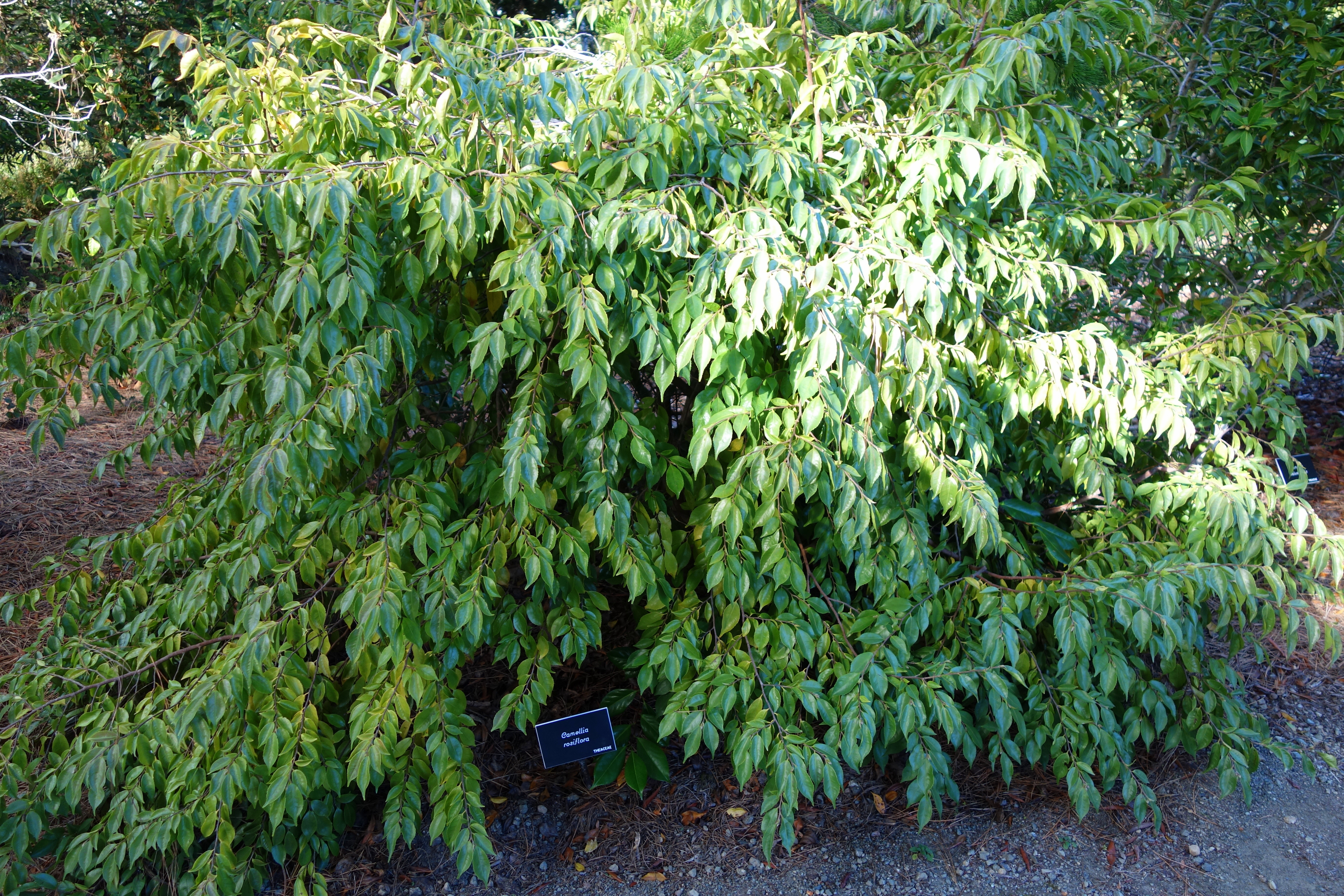
- At Mendocino Coast Botanical Gardens
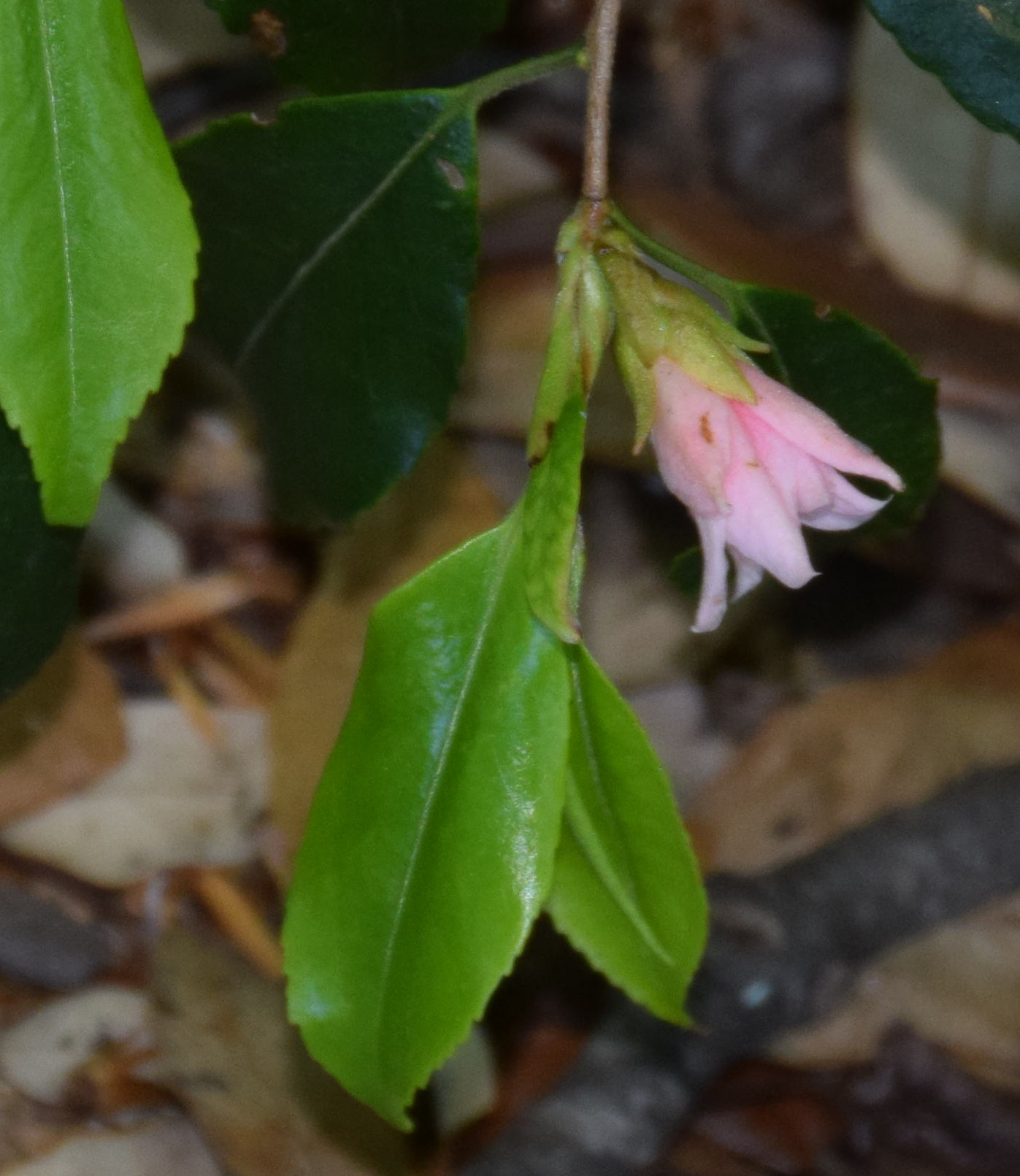
- An unrepresentative flower

Scientific classification
- Kingdom: Plantae
- Clade: Tracheophytes
- Clade: Angiosperms
- Clade: Eudicots
- Clade: Asterids
- Order: Ericales
- Family: Theaceae
- Genus: Camellia
- Species: C. rosiflora

Binomial name
- Camellia rosiflora Hook.

Synonyms
- Thea maliflora Seem.; Thea rosiflora (Hook.) Kuntze

= Camellia rosiflora =

Species of plant

Camellia rosiflora is a species of flowering plant in the tea family Theaceae. It is native to southern China but is possibly extinct in the wild. A shrub reaching 1.5 to 2.4 m (5 to 8 ft), it is hardy in USDA zones 7 through 9 and is recommended for hedges. There appears to be a cultivar, 'Roseaflora Cascade'.
