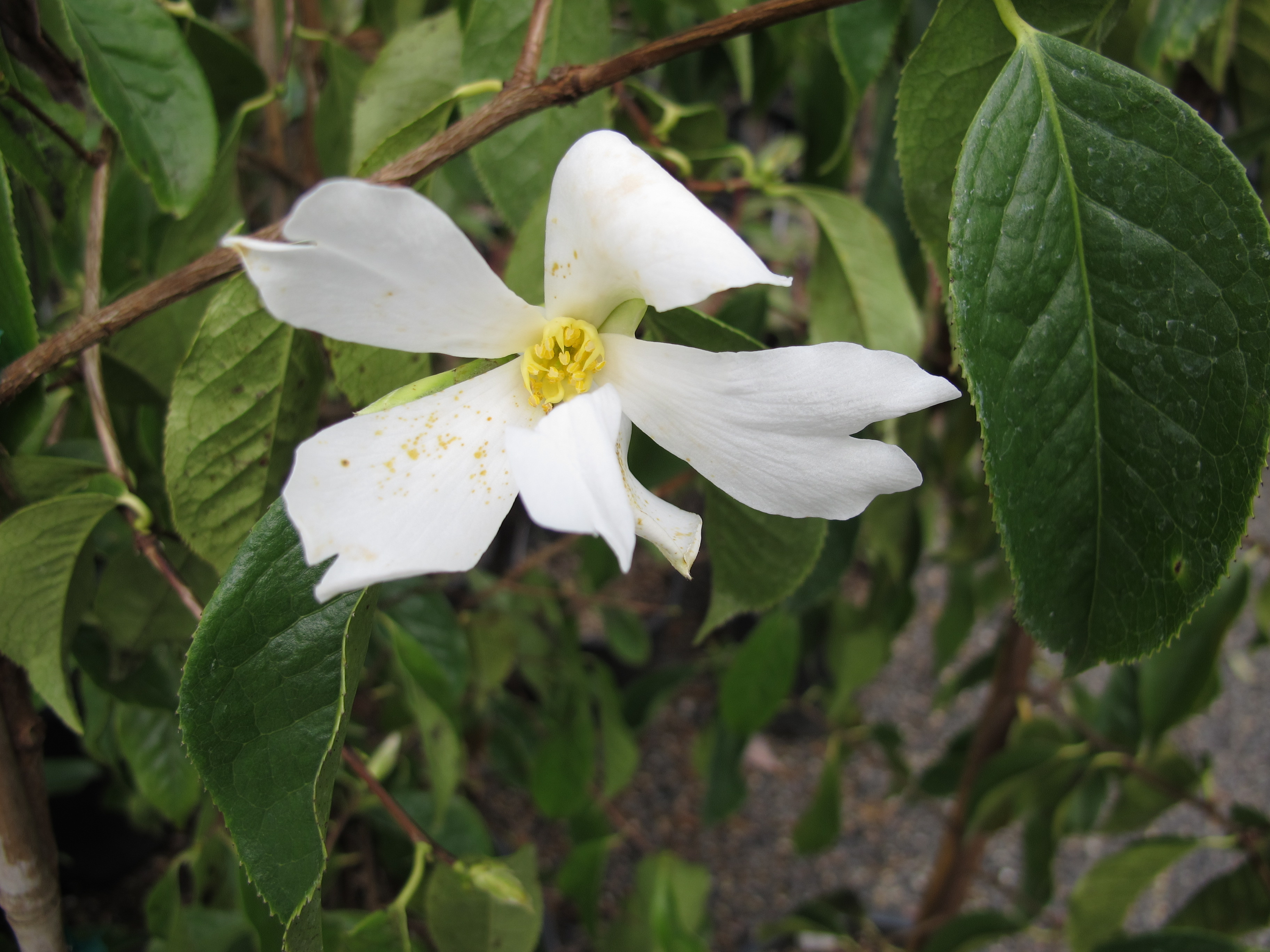

Conservation status
- Data Deficient (IUCN 3.1)

Scientific classification
- Kingdom: Plantae
- Clade: Tracheophytes
- Clade: Angiosperms
- Clade: Eudicots
- Clade: Asterids
- Order: Ericales
- Family: Theaceae
- Genus: Camellia
- Species: C. grijsii

Binomial name
- Camellia grijsii Hance

= Camellia grijsii =

Species of flowering plant

Camellia grijsii is a species of plant in the family Theaceae. It is endemic to China. It is threatened by habitat loss.
