= Camellia langbianensis =

Conservation status
- Data Deficient (IUCN 3.1)

Scientific classification
- Kingdom: Plantae
- Clade: Tracheophytes
- Clade: Angiosperms
- Clade: Eudicots
- Clade: Asterids
- Order: Ericales
- Family: Theaceae
- Genus: Camellia
- Species: C. langbianensis

Binomial name
- Camellia langbianensis (Gagnep.) P.H.Hô (1991)

Synonyms
- Camellia vidalii Rosmann (1999); Dankia langbianensis Gagnep. (1939)

Species of plant

Camellia langbianenesis is a species of flowering plant belonging to the family Theaceae. It is a shrub or small tree native to southern Vietnam.

Camellia langbianensis is small tree growing up to 5 meters tall. It is known from a single specimen collected near Dankia Lake on the Đà Lạt (Lang Biang) Plateau in southeastern Vietnam, between 1,200 and 1,300 meters elevation. It grows as an understory tree in montane rainforest, and can tolerate light and relatively poor soil.

The species was first described as Dankia langbianensis by François Gagnepain in 1939, as the sole species in genus Dankia. In 1991 P. H. Hô reclassified it into genus Camellia.

There is no recent collection or record of this species in the wild. Its current population is unknown.
