= Camellia edithae =

Scientific classification
- Kingdom: Plantae
- Clade: Tracheophytes
- Clade: Angiosperms
- Clade: Eudicots
- Clade: Asterids
- Order: Ericales
- Family: Theaceae
- Genus: Camellia
- Species: C. edithae

Binomial name
- Camellia edithae Hance

Synonyms
- Thea edithae (Hance) Kuntze

Species of plant

Camellia edithae is a species of flowering plant in the tea family Theaceae, native to southeastern China. A shrub or small tree typically 2 to 7 m (7 to 23 ft) tall, it grows in forests at elevations from 200 to 1,000 m (700 to 3,300 ft).
