= Avenida de las Camelias =

- March of Argentina
- Music: Pedro Maranesi, 1915; 110 years ago

Audio sample
- Performed by the Argentine Army Band: file; help

"Avenida de las Camelias" (Camellia Avenue) is an Argentine military march composed in 1915 by Pedro Maranesi. (Note: Born Pietro Maranesi.) It is a completely instrumental work usually played with bass drums and trumpets. Its vigorous rhythm makes it one of the main marches of the Argentine Armed Forces, which currently perform it in their parades and ceremonies, next to the San Lorenzo march.

== History ==
Very little history is known about this march. Oral tradition dates its inspiration to 1915, when the 5th Army Division Band was rehearsing some marching maneuvers in a small village in Salta Province called Campo del Durazno, in Rosario de la Frontera Department. A new street was opened there, which was named after Camellia flowers that were around it. Maestro Pedro Maranesi took this fact and composed a march on the bass drumhead, and named it Avenida de las Camelias.

The march quickly earned a big popularity, being performed in numerous military parades, ceremonies and internal activities of the Argentine Armed Forces, and played by bands in foreign countries as well, such as Germany and Poland. It was also profusely used during the Argentine military dictatorship of 1976 to 1983, also known as the National Reorganization Process.

== See also ==
- San Lorenzo march
