= Camellia pleurocarpa =

Conservation status
- Data Deficient (IUCN 3.1)

Scientific classification
- Kingdom: Plantae
- Clade: Tracheophytes
- Clade: Angiosperms
- Clade: Eudicots
- Clade: Asterids
- Order: Ericales
- Family: Theaceae
- Genus: Camellia
- Species: C. pleurocarpa

Binomial name
- Camellia pleurocarpa (Gagnep.) Sealy

Synonyms
- Thea pleurocarpa Gagnep.

Species of tree

Camellia pleurocarpa is a species of flowering plant in the family Theaceae. It is endemic to Vietnam.
