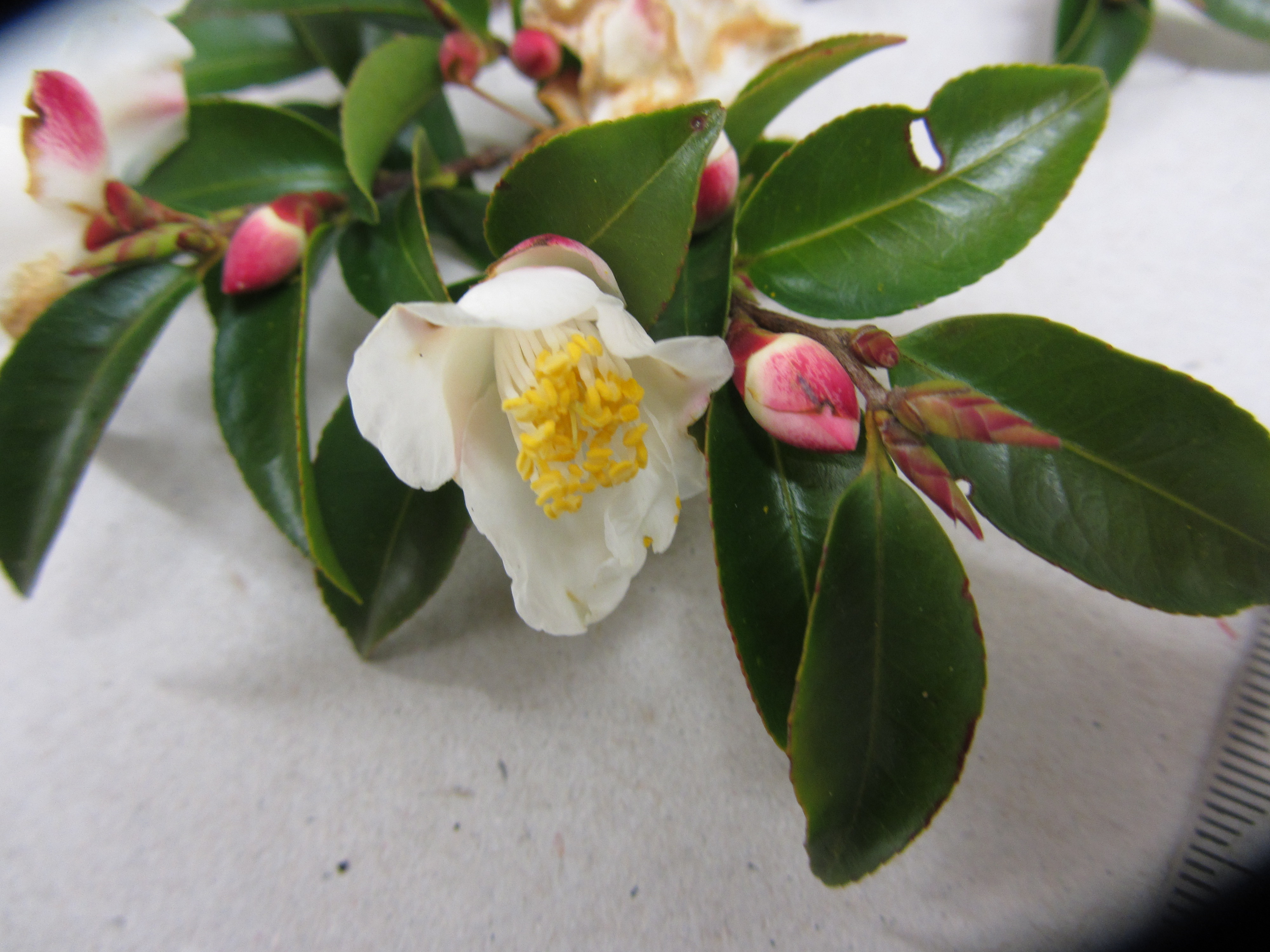

Conservation status
- Least Concern (IUCN 3.1)

Scientific classification
- Kingdom: Plantae
- Clade: Tracheophytes
- Clade: Angiosperms
- Clade: Eudicots
- Clade: Asterids
- Order: Ericales
- Family: Theaceae
- Genus: Camellia
- Species: C. lutchuensis

Binomial name
- Camellia lutchuensis T.Itô

= Camellia lutchuensis =

Species of flowering plant

Camellia lutchuensis is a species of camellia that is widespread in southeastern China, Taiwan, and the Ryukyu Islands of Japan. It is a shrub or small tree growing from 2–7 meters in height, with evergreen leaves and fragrant, white flowers.

== Gallery ==
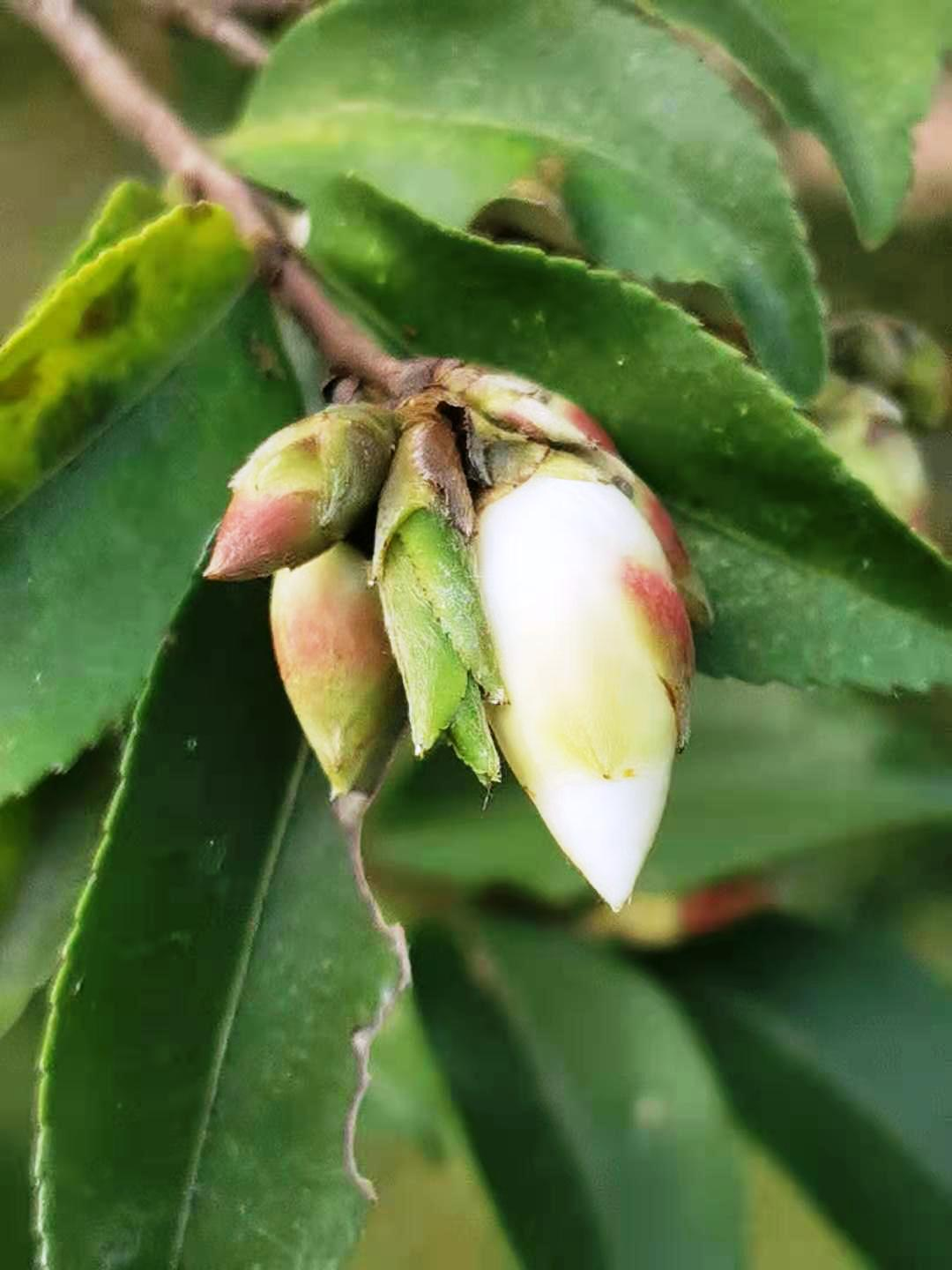

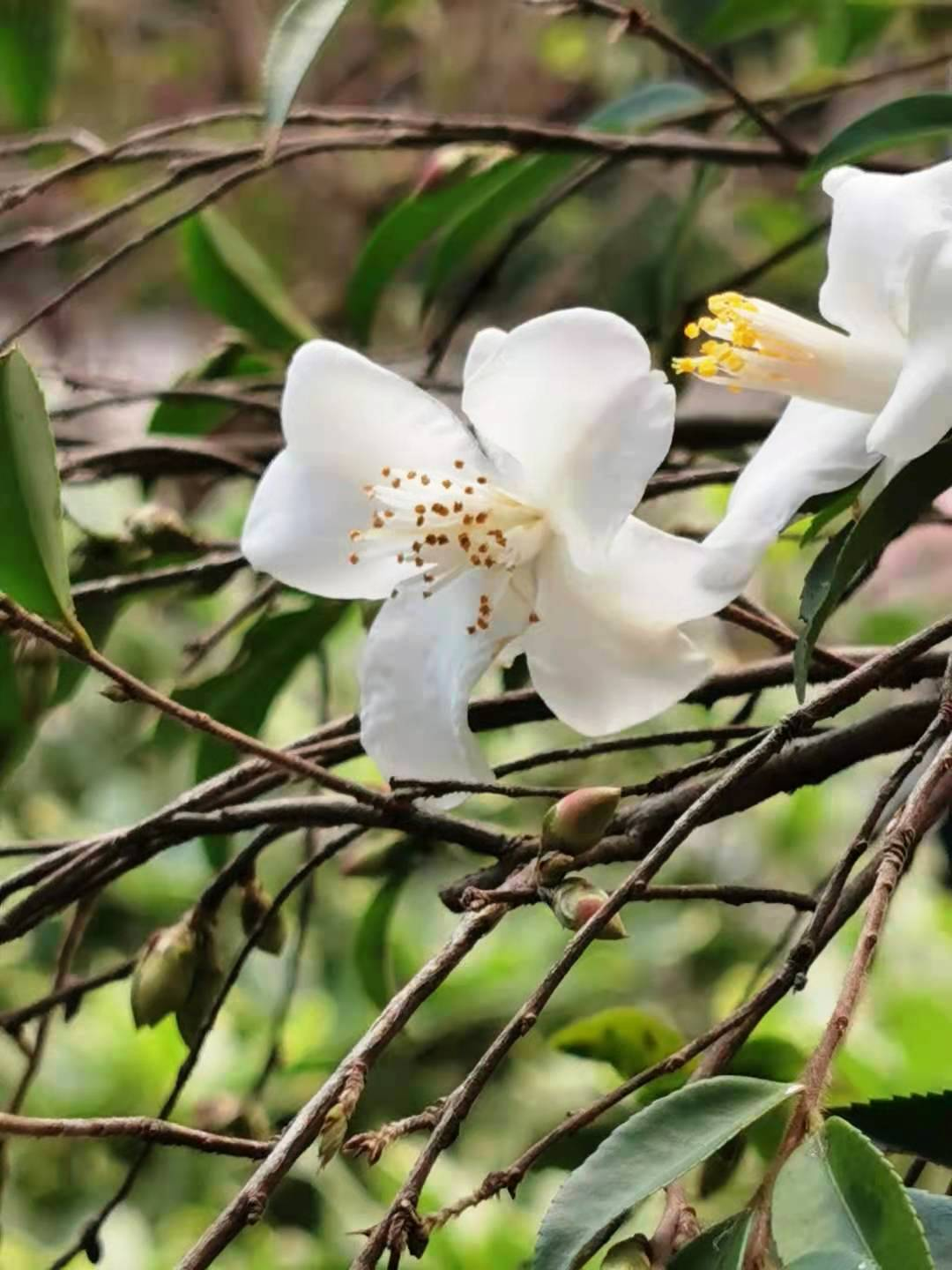

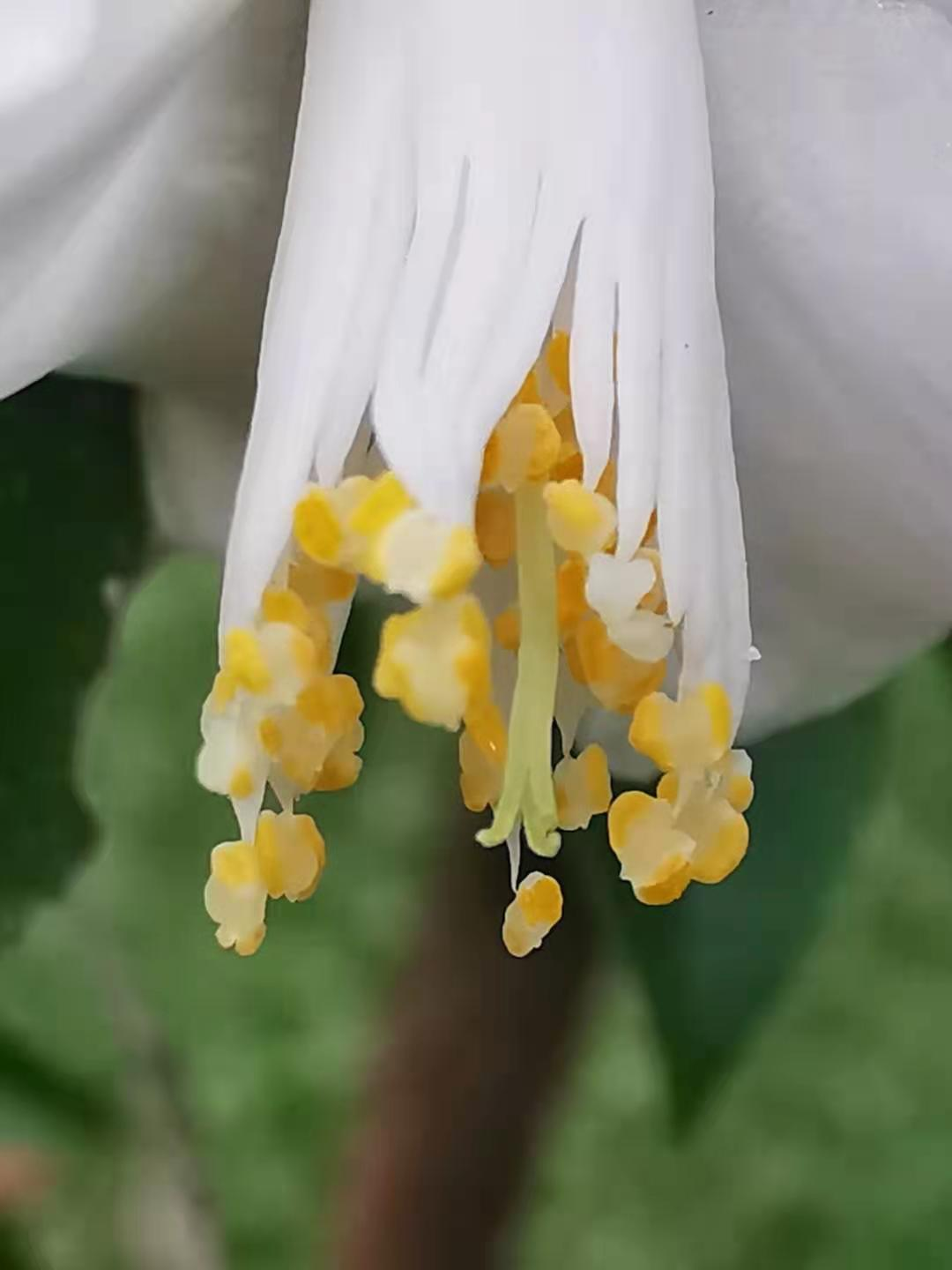

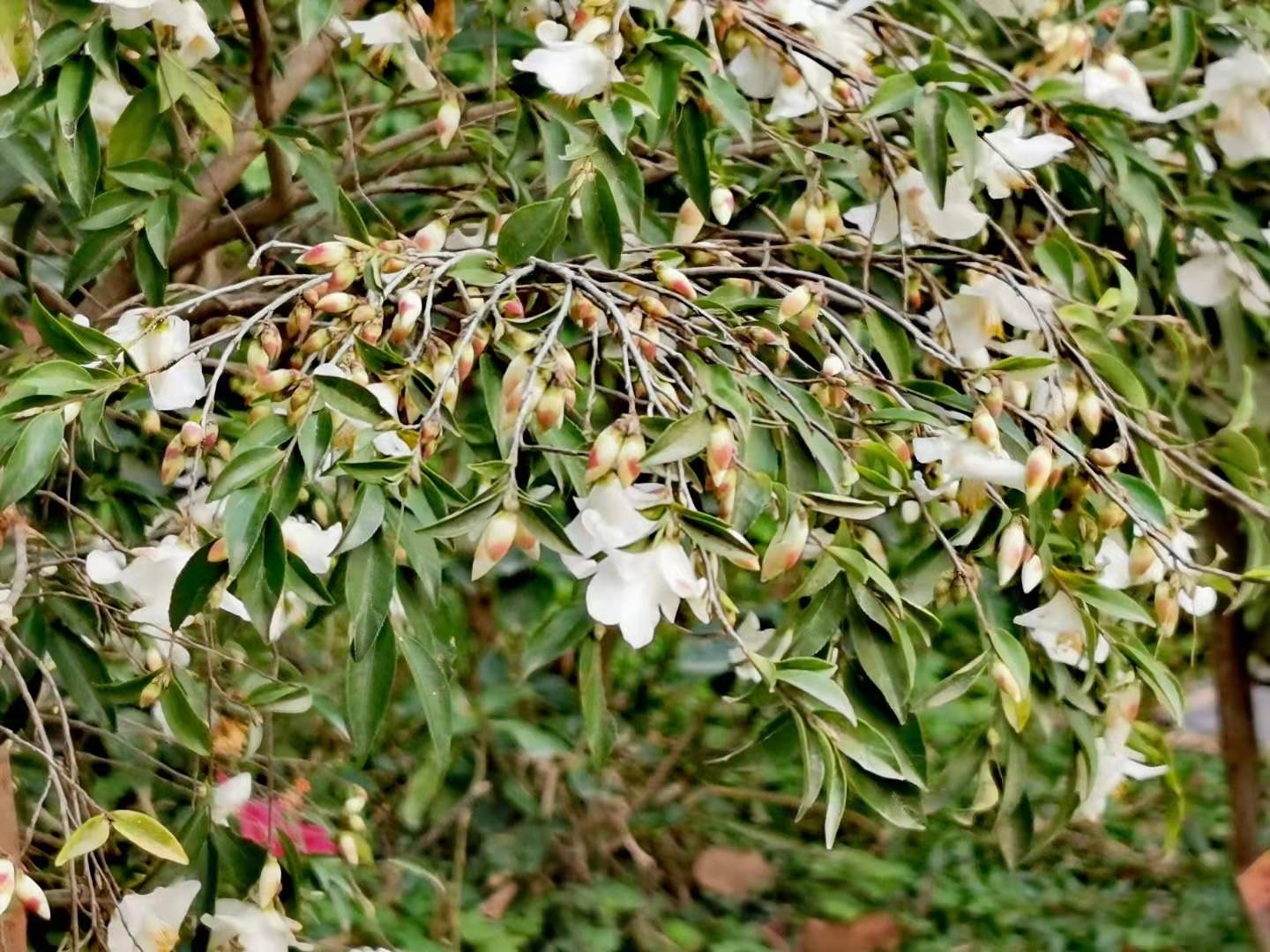
