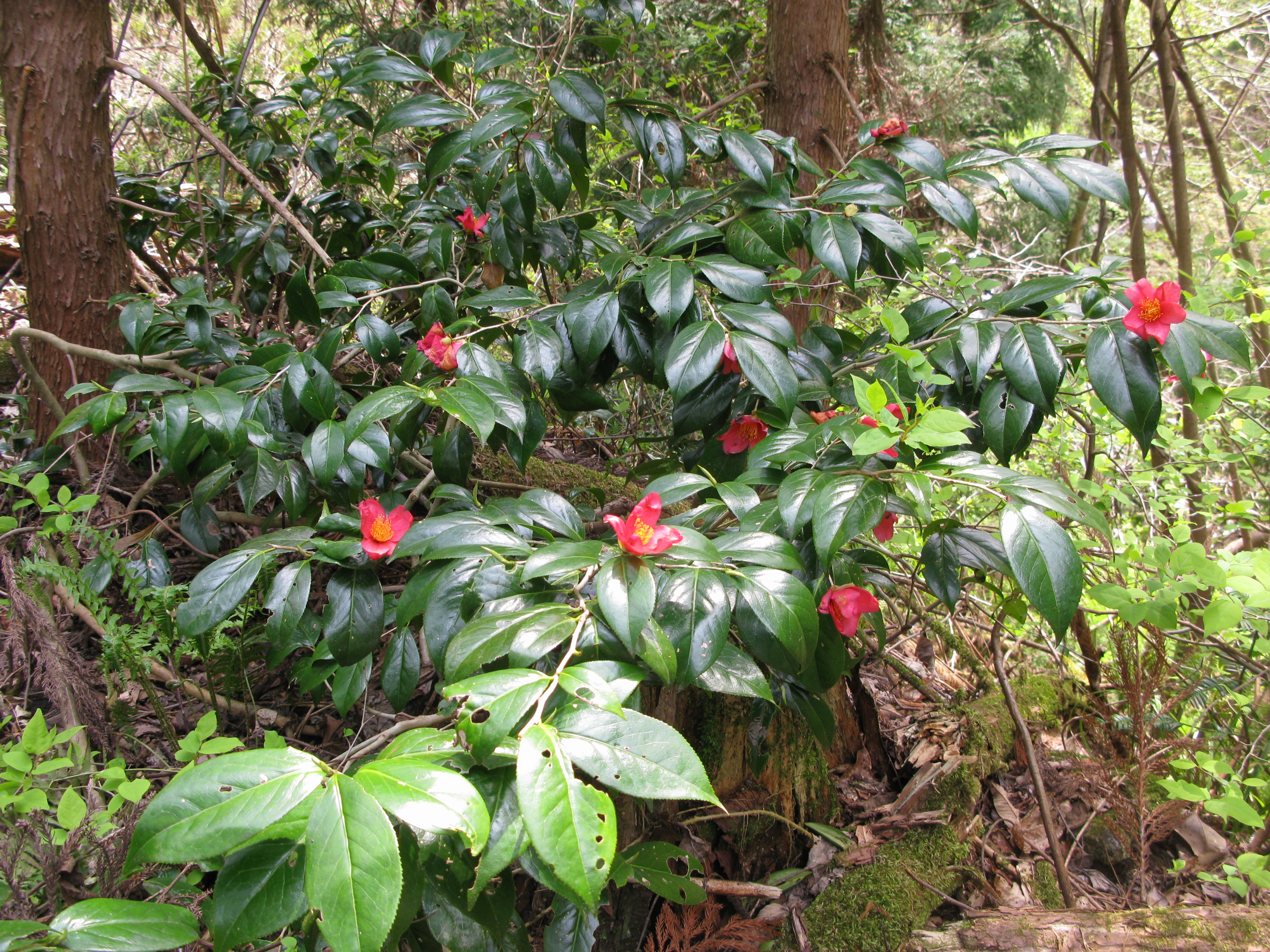

Scientific classification
- Kingdom: Plantae
- Clade: Tracheophytes
- Clade: Angiosperms
- Clade: Eudicots
- Clade: Asterids
- Order: Ericales
- Family: Theaceae
- Genus: Camellia
- Species: C. rusticana

Binomial name
- Camellia rusticana Honda 1947

= Camellia rusticana =

Species of flowering plant

Camellia rusticana or snow camellia is a species of Camellia from Japan.
