= Gordonia (plant) =

- Gordonia lasianthus

Scientific classification
- Kingdom: Plantae
- Clade: Tracheophytes
- Clade: Angiosperms
- Clade: Eudicots
- Clade: Asterids
- Order: Ericales
- Family: Theaceae
- Genus: Gordonia; Ellis

Species
- See text

Synonyms
- Haemocharis Salisb. ex Mart. & Zucc.; Laplacea Kunth; Lasianthus Adans.; Lindleya Nees; Michauxia Salisb.; Wikstroemia Schrad.

Genus of flowering plants

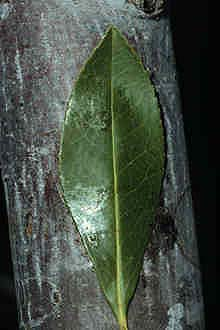
Gordonia lasianthus leaf and branch

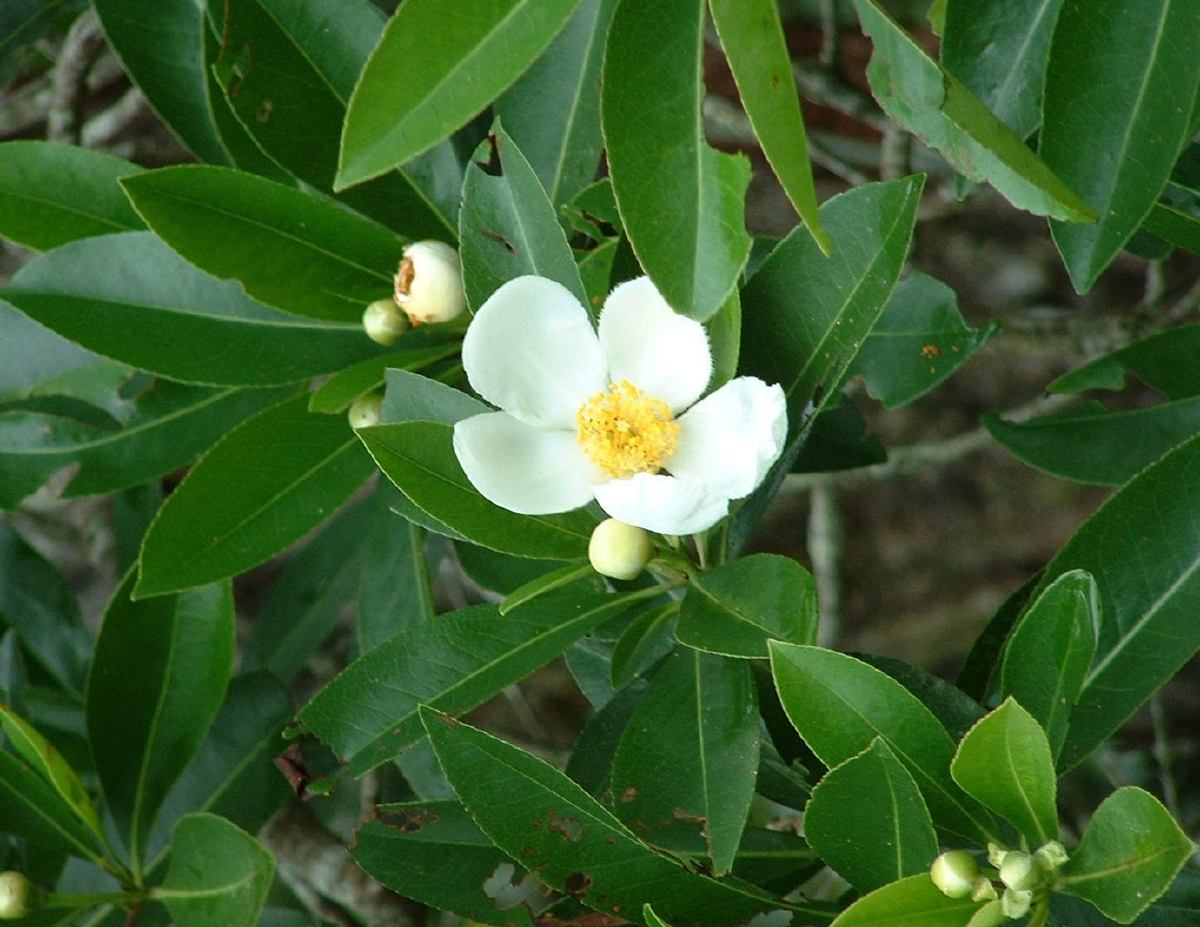
Gordonia lasianthus beginning to bloom, June, N. Florida

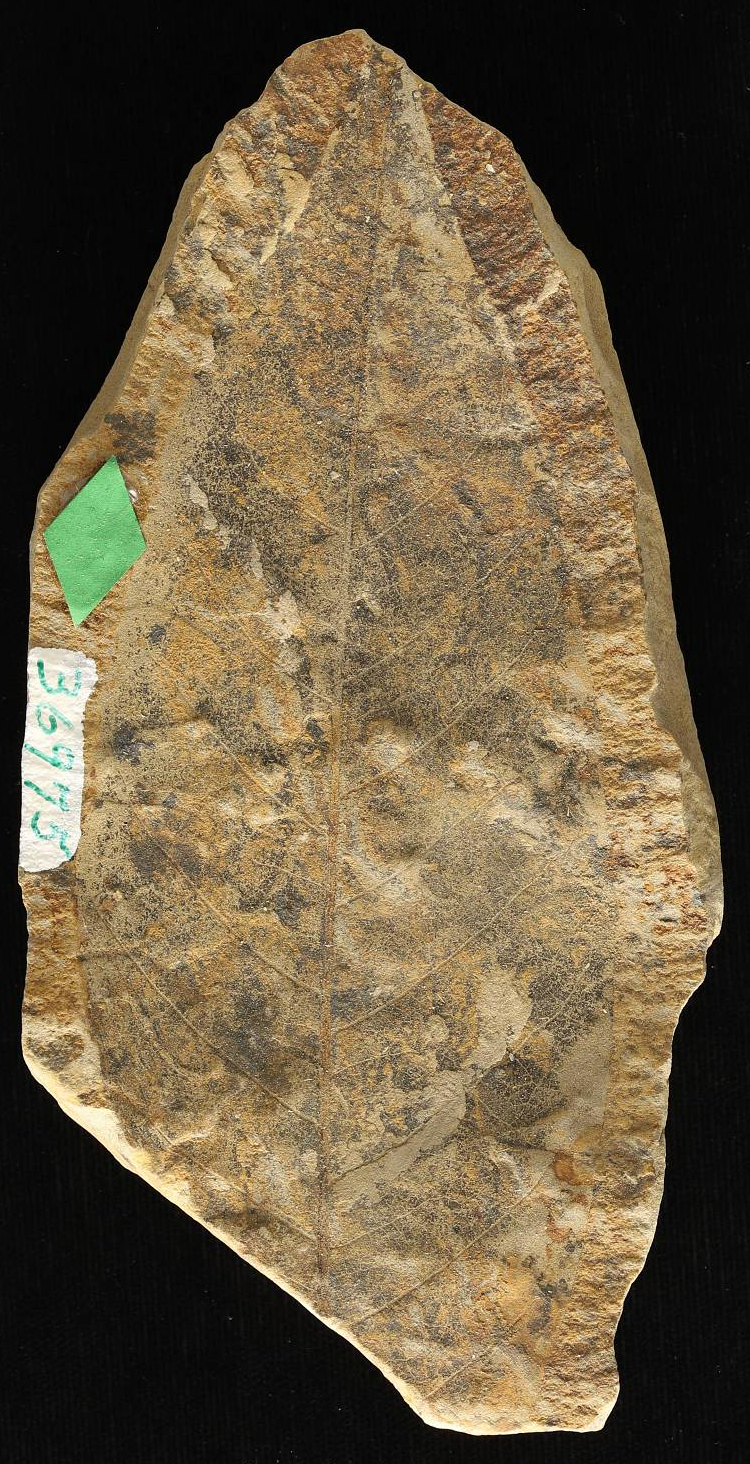
Gordonia idahoensis fossils

Gordonia is a genus of flowering plants in the family Theaceae, related to Franklinia, Camellia and Stewartia. It includes 22 species native to the tropical and subtropical Americas, ranging from the southeastern United States and southern Mexico to Bolivia and southern Brazil.

They are evergreen trees, growing to 10–20 m tall. The bark is thick and deeply fissured. The leaves are alternately arranged, simple, serrated, thick, leathery, glossy, and 6–18 cm long. The flowers are large and conspicuous, 4–15 cm diameter, with 5 (occasionally 6-8) white petals; flowering is in late winter or early spring. The fruit is a dry five-valved capsule, with 1-4 seeds in each section.

The species are adapted to acidic soils, and do not grow well on chalk or other calcium-rich soils. They also have a high rainfall requirement and will not tolerate drought.

Some botanists include Franklinia within Gordonia, even though recent phylogenetic studies show that Franklinia's closest living relationship is with the Asian genera Schima and not Gordonia; it differs in being deciduous and flowering in late summer, not late winter. The draft Flora of China account of Theaceae in China split Gordonia into two genera, with G. lasianthus retained in Gordonia, and the Asian species transferred to Polyspora.

== Species ==
22 species are accepted.

- Gordonia acutifolia (Wawra) H.Keng
- Gordonia alpestris (Krug & Urb.) H.Keng
- Gordonia angustifolia (Britton & P.Wilson) H.Keng
- Gordonia barbinervis (Moric.) Walp.
- Gordonia benitoensis (Britton & P.Wilson) H.Keng
- Gordonia brenesii (Standl.) Q.Jiménez
- Gordonia cristalensis (Borhidi & O.Muñiz) Greuter & R.Rankin
- Gordonia curtyana (A.Rich.) H.Keng
- Gordonia ekmanii (O.C.Schmidt) H.Keng
- Gordonia fruticosa (Schrad.) H.Keng
- Gordonia haematoxylon Sw.
- Gordonia lasianthus (L.) Ellis
- Gordonia moaensis (Vict.) H.Keng
- Gordonia portoricensis (Krug & Urb.) H.Keng
- Gordonia pubescens Cav.
- Gordonia robusta (Kobuski) H.Keng
- Gordonia samuelssonii (O.C.Schmidt) H.Keng
- Gordonia spathulata (Kobuski) H.Keng
- Gordonia tomentosa (Mart.) Spreng.
- Gordonia urbani (O.C.Schmidt) H.Keng
- Gordonia villosa Macfad.
- Gordonia wrightii (Griseb.) H.Keng

=== Formerly placed here ===
Gordonia species from East Asia have been transferred to Polyspora, Pyrenaria, and Schima, including:

- Polyspora axillaris (Roxb. ex Ker Gawl.) Sweet (as G. axillaris (Roxb. ex Ker Gawl.) Endl.)
- Polyspora ceylanica (Wight) Orel, Peter G.Wilson, Curry & Luu (as G. ceylanica Wight)
- Polyspora chrysandra (Cowan) Hu ex B.M.Barthol. & T.L.Ming (as G. chrysandra Cowan)
- Polyspora gardneri Orel, Peter G.Wilson, Curry & Luu (as G. speciosa (Gardner) Choisy)
- Polyspora hainanensis (Hung T.Chang) C.X.Ye ex S.X.Yang (as G. hainanensis (Hung T.Chang) C.X.Ye ex S.X.Yang)
- Polyspora hirtella (Ridl.) Orel, Peter G.Wilson, Curry & Luu (as G. hirtella Ridl.)
- Polyspora longicarpa (Hung T.Chang) C.X.Ye ex B.M.Barthol. & T.L.Ming (as G. longicarpa Hung T.Chang)
- Polyspora maingayi (Dyer) Orel, Peter G.Wilson, Curry & Luu (as G. maingayi Dyer)
- Polyspora multinervis (King) Orel, Peter G.Wilson, Curry & Luu (as G. multinervis King)
- Polyspora penangensis (Ridl.) Niissalo & L.M.Choo (as G. penangensis Ridl.)
- Polyspora scortechinii (King) Orel, Peter G.Wilson, Curry & Luu (as G. scortechinii King)
- Polyspora singaporeana (Wall. ex Ridl.) Niissalo & L.M.Choo (as G. singaporeana Wall. ex Ridl.)
- Polyspora taipingensis (Burkill) Orel, Peter G.Wilson, Curry & Luu (as G. taipingensis Burkill)
- Polyspora tonkinensis (Pit.) S.X.Yang (as G. tonkinensis Pit.)
- Pyrenaria hirta (Hand.-Mazz.) H.Keng (as G. hirta Hand.-Mazz.)
- Schima sinensis (Hemsl. & E.H.Wilson) Airy Shaw (as G. sinensis Hemsl. & E.H.Wilson)
- Schima wallichii (DC.) Korth. (as G. wallichiii DC.)

== Cultivation and uses ==
Several species of Gordonia are grown as ornamental plants for their flowers produced in winter when few other trees are in flower. They are however difficult to grow compared to the similar but generally smaller-growing camellias.
