= Carex ledongensis =

Scientific classification
- Kingdom: Plantae
- Clade: Tracheophytes
- Clade: Angiosperms
- Clade: Monocots
- Clade: Commelinids
- Order: Poales
- Family: Cyperaceae
- Genus: Carex
- Species: C. ledongensis

Binomial name
- Carex ledongensis H.B.Yang & G.D.Liu

Species of sedge

Carex ledongensis is a species of sedge in the family Cyperaceae. Found in the tropical monsoon rainforests of Hainan Island, China, it was described as a new species in 2020. It shares similarities with the species Carex pseudotristachya but exhibits distinct characteristics that set it apart.

== Taxonomy ==
Carex ledongensis, formally described in 2020 by Hu-Biao Yang and Guo-Dao Liu, is named after its type locality in Ledong County, Hainan, where it was first discovered in the Jianfengling Nature Reserve. The species is known as 乐东薹草 in Chinese. The holotype specimen is preserved at the herbarium of the South China National Botanical Garden, while isotypes can be found at the Chinese Academy of Tropical Agricultural Sciences.

== Description ==
This plant is quite similar in appearance to C. pseudotristachya but has several distinguishing features. Its leaves are 4–5 times longer than its culms, and it has three spikes as opposed to the 2–4 spikes typically found in C. pseudotristachya. The terminal spike of C. ledongensis is equipped with a 1.5 cm (0.6 in) long peduncle, and the lateral spikes are androgynous. The perigynia are fusiform and measure 6–8 mm long, while the nutlets are brownish-black and 5–6 mm long.

== Habitat and distribution ==
Carex ledongensis thrives in the tropical monsoon rainforests of Hainan Island's Jianfengling Nature Reserve, at elevations of around 1,360 m (4,460 ft). The plant is commonly found alongside other species such as Pentaphylax euryoides, Ternstroemia gymnanthera, Photinia glabra, Polyspora axillaris, Rhodomyrtus tomentosa, Manglietia hainanensis, and Oligostachyum nuspiculum. The flowering period for Carex ledongensis occurs in March, with ripe fruits appearing in May.

== Conservation status ==
The known population of Carex ledongensis covers an area of approximately 30,000 square metres (36,000 sq yd). However, the individual density within this population is relatively low, with about 25 clumped individuals per 100 square metres (120 sq yd). According to the authors, continuous monitoring is necessary to ensure the conservation of this plant species.

== See also ==
- List of Carex species
