= Stewartia micrantha =

Scientific classification
- Kingdom: Plantae
- Clade: Tracheophytes
- Clade: Angiosperms
- Clade: Eudicots
- Clade: Asterids
- Order: Ericales
- Family: Theaceae
- Genus: Stewartia
- Species: S. micrantha

Binomial name
- Stewartia micrantha (Chun) Sealy

Species of flowering plant

Stewartia micrantha is a species of flowering plant in the family Theaceae. It is in China and it is a shrub and grows primarily in the subtropical biome.
