= Gordonia lasianthus =

Conservation status
- Least Concern (IUCN 3.1)

Scientific classification
- Kingdom: Plantae
- Clade: Tracheophytes
- Clade: Angiosperms
- Clade: Eudicots
- Clade: Asterids
- Order: Ericales
- Family: Theaceae
- Genus: Gordonia
- Species: G. lasianthus

Binomial name
- Gordonia lasianthus (L.) Ellis
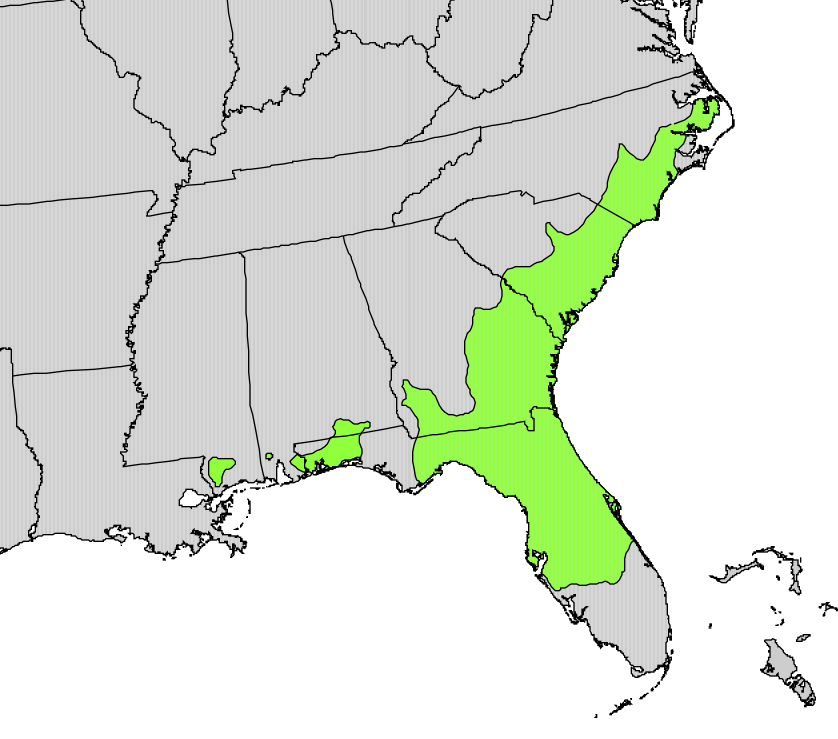
- Natural range

Species of tree

Gordonia lasianthus (loblolly-bay, holly-bay, gordonia, or bay) is a small to medium-sized evergreen tree or shrub found in acidic, swampy soils of pinelands and bays on the Atlantic and Gulf Coastal Plains of the southeastern United States. It is a member of the tea or family Theaceae. It is slow growing with soft, light-colored (varies in color from cream to carmine), fine-grained wood of little commercial value, although loblolly-bay could be managed as a source of pulpwood. When older specimens are cut, the wood exudes a strong scent. It is similar to a mixture of fresh oranges and pine sap. The bark of the adult tree varies from medium grey to a red brown coloration. Dead adult specimens of loblolly bay exhibit a lustrous shine when exposed to sunlight for several years. The white showy flowers and shiny foliage make it a desirable ornamental, but it is not easy to cultivate. Deer browse stump sprouts heavily.

== Habitat ==
=== Native range ===
Loblolly-bay is continuously distributed along the Atlantic and Gulf Coastal Plains from Coastal Southern Virginia to the Appalachicola River in the Florida Panhandle. Discontinuous populations exist in Florida, the coastal counties of Alabama, the coastal counties of Mississippi, south and southeast Texas, and southern Louisiana. In South Carolina it is commonly found in the lower Coastal Plain, but in the middle and upper Coastal Plain it is restricted to specific sites.

=== Climate ===
The climate over the range of loblolly-bay is characterized by mild winters and warm summers. Air temperature data, compiled from a weather atlas (8), are as follows:

Property	Northern extreme	Southern extreme
Temperature:	16 °C (61 °F)	21 °C (70 °F)
Annual daily average	3 °C (37 °F)	11 °C (52 °F)
Normal daily minimum; January	10 °C (50 °F)	11 °C (52 °F)
Normal daily maximum; July	31 °C (88 °F)	32 °C (90 °F)
Days with daily max. above 32 °C (90 °F)	20	120
Days with daily min. below 0 °C (32 °F)	50	3
Mean frost-free days	230	320

The average annual precipitation within the range of loblolly-bay is 1,630 mm (64 in) in Florida, declining to 1,120 mm (44 in) in North Carolina, and is fairly evenly distributed throughout the year.

Approximately 53 percent of the annual precipitation occurs during the months of June, July, August, September, and October. Annually there are from 110 to 120 days with only a trace of rainfall.

== Soils and topography ==
In North and South Carolina, loblolly-bay is apparently very soil-specific even though it is found on several soil series. It grows on certain Spodosols, Inceptisols, Ultisols, and Histosols and to a lesser degree on Entisols and Mollisols (7). Soil profiles of a loblolly-bay site in South Carolina have the following general characteristics at various soil horizons:

- A1- 0 to 25 cm (0.0 to 9.8 in) black to dark gray, fine sand, loamy fine sand or loamy sand, very strongly or extremely acid,
- A2- 25 to 38 cm (10 to 15 in) black or gray, sand, loamy fine sand or sandy loam, very strongly or extremely acid (often there is no A2),
- B- 38 to 51 to 127 cm (15 to 20 to 50 in) gray or brown, sand to sandy loam, very strongly acid (often not present),
- C- 51 to 127 to 175 cm (20 to 50 to 69 in) gray or brown, sand, fine sand or loamy fine sand, strongly to very strongly acid.

Loblolly-bay grows in flat woodlands or shallow depressions with little or no slope, slow runoff, rapid permeability, and poor to very poor drainage. In South Carolina the soils are usually of sandy coastal plain or marine origin, except for the organic soils. The water table is at or near the soil surface for 6 to 9 months of the year.

In South Carolina's lower Coastal Plain, loblolly-bay is found in wet flats and in bays, typically the Carolina Bays (11). In the upper and middle Coastal Plain, it is found mainly along the edges of Carolina Bays and is widely dispersed in wet, flat woodlands on certain soil types.

=== Associated forest cover ===
Loblolly-bay is found in five forest cover types (2) within the Atlantic Coastal Plain (9,10,11). Pondcypress (Society of American Foresters Type 100) is found in certain Carolina Bays with ponded water. Loblolly-bay is not found in the bay interior with pondcypress (Taxodium distichum var. nutans), probably because of the high water table; rather it is found along better drained margins. Here it is growing with loblolly pine (Pinus taeda) and redbay (Persea borbonia var. borbonia) in the overstory and fetterbush (Lyonia lucida), inkberry (Ilex glabra), and greenbrier (Smilax spp.) in the understory.

Loblolly-bay is a minor component of Loblolly Pine-Hardwood (Type 82) but cannot be found consistently. In the middle Coastal Plain of South Carolina, loblolly-bay is found with loblolly pine, water oak (Quercus nigra), sweetgum (Liquidambar styraciflua), American holly (Ilex opaca), redbay, longleaf pine (Pinus palustris), and yellow-poplar (Liriodendron tulipifera). Loblolly-bay is found only in the wetter areas of this forest cover type.

Loblolly-bay is a minor component of Atlantic White-Cedar (Type 97), along with pond pine (Pinus serotina), swamp cyrilla (Cyrilla racemiflora), redbay, and sweetbay (Magnolia virginiana).

Pond Pine (Type 98) is the typical vegetation of wet flats and some Carolina Bays in South Carolina. Loblolly-bay, pond pine, sweetbay, and redbay are the tree species present, and they rarely form a closed canopy. The thick, shrub layer is composed of fetterbush, greenbrier vines, inkberry, and loblolly-bay.

Sweetbay-Swamp Tupelo-Redbay (Type 104) is the "broadleaf evergreen forest" of the lower Coastal Plain of North and South Carolina. Loblolly-bay is a minor component in the overstory along with red maple (Acer rubrum), black tupelo (Nyssa sylvatica var. sylvatica), sweetgum, and water oak.

== Life history ==
The information of this section is based on measurements and observations made in the northern Coastal Plain of South Carolina.

=== Reproduction and early growth ===
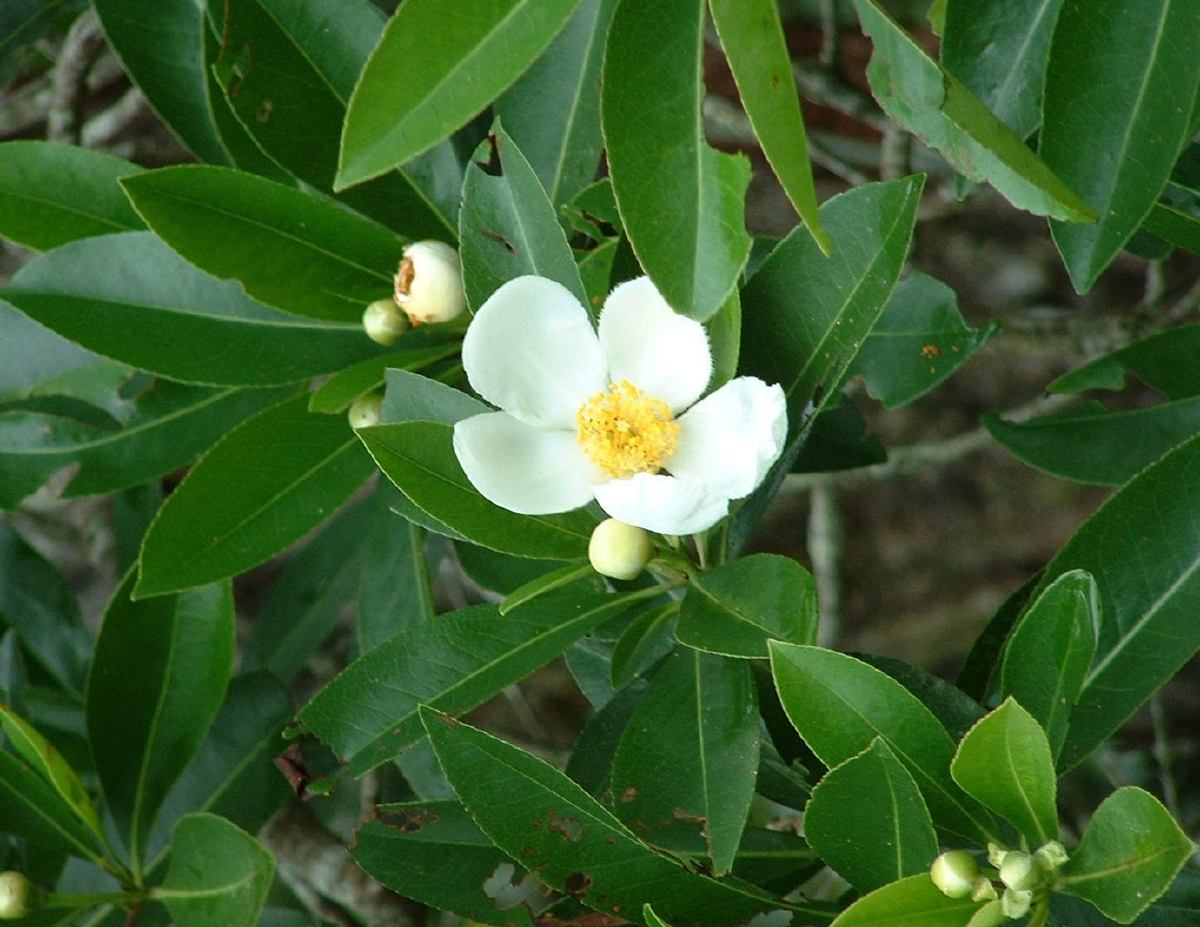
Gordonia lasianthus beginning to bloom, June, N. Florida

Flowering and fruiting- Flowers are perfect. Flower bud formation is visible by the time new leaves fully expand. The peduncle expands rapidly and the young bud slowly enlarges until it opens. Flower buds at the top of the tree open first. Flowers are first seen from the last week in June to the first week of July and may be seen until mid-August. Flowers remain open for 1 or 2 days and are pollinated by bumble bees, thrips, flies, and hummingbirds. After the second day the sepals and petals fall, leaving the ovary at the end of the peduncle.

Seed production and dissemination- As the ovaries develop they gradually turn brown and five sutures develop. Mature, open capsules are first seen during September or October, and all of the capsules open by the middle of December. Seeds are shaken out of the capsules by the wind and empty capsules remain attached until peduncle and capsule abscission, which first occurs about the last of December and continues through the winter.

Seedfall starts in October, peaks in December, and continues until the first of March. Loblolly-bay seeds are light (120,000 to 151,000/lb or 265,000 to 333,000/kg) and winged. Results from one study indicated that approximately 99 percent of the seeds produced fall within two tree heights of the source tree. This study also indicated that this distribution of seedfall is concentrated near the source tree, 60 percent of the seeds falling within a distance equal to one-half of the tree height, and 94 percent of the seeds falling within a distance equal to the tree height. Seedfall rates during a 2-year study varied from 2,600 to 273,000/ha (1,070 to 110,400/acre).

Seedling development- Seed germination in petri dishes in sunlight is high: 70 to 80 percent within 10 days. In a greenhouse heated at 13 to 16 °C (55 to 61 °F), similar germination percentages were obtained but up to 24 days were required. Germination is epigeal. Very few seedlings have been observed in the field and most of those seen apparently do not live past the first season. Loblolly-bay seedlings seem to require relatively open conditions and exposed soil for establishment. Older seedlings have only been observed where the mineral soil has been disturbed such as in recently plowed fire lines.

Initial growth of the seedlings is slow. Field observations indicated that by the end of the third growing season the seedlings were about 10 to 15 cm (4 to 6 in) tall and by the eighth growing season they were only 30 to 40 cm (12 to 15.5 in) high.

Vegetative reproduction- Vegetative propagation of first-year shoots in a peat and sand medium under mist is commonly used by horticulturists (1). In the field, vegetative regeneration appears to be more common than regeneration from seed. Stump sprouts may grow as much as 1 m (3.3 ft) in the first year after the tree is cut. These stump sprouts appear to be very attractive to deer and heavy browsing has been noticed.

Numerous root-collar sprouts are produced when the trees are killed by fire (9) or if the root system is mechanically damaged by a logging or disking operation.

=== Sapling and pole stages to maturity ===
Growth and yield- Early tree growth (ages 5 to 15 years) is relatively rapid. Height growth for the first 15 years averages 0.6 metres per year (2.0 feet per year), with a 10-year-old tree averaging 6.5 m (21 ft) in height. These figures do not compare with the seedling's growth figures because growth and yield measurements were made on stems that were most probably sprouts. Early diameter growth at breast height is about 0.4 metres per year (1.3 feet per year), a 10-year-old tree being about 5.1 to 6.1 cm (2.0 to 2.4 in) in d.b.h.

Rooting habit- The root system of loblolly-bay appears to reflect its strong tendency to reproduce by sprouting. A number of specimens examined had a large primary lateral root with secondary roots branching downward.

Reaction to competition- Loblolly-bay is classed as tolerant of shade. In bays and wet flats, where the tree cover is relatively light, loblolly-bay is a strong competitor. It generally increases in height faster than the pines on the adjacent upland. However, if loblolly-bay is overtopped, older trees will lose their characteristic conical shape and the crown will break up.

Damaging agents- Only two symptoms of insects or pathogens have been observed locally. Neither causal agent was identified. An ooze was noticed in a wound at the base of a mature tree, but otherwise the tree appeared healthy. An unknown grazing insect consumed all but the leaf veins of the late-season flush of leaves during August. Another noticeable sensitivity is to fire. The thin bark and shallow root system of loblolly-bay probably contribute to its low fire tolerance. Dead wood is extremely susceptible to rotting and Fungi.

== Special uses ==
Loblolly-bay has long been used by horticulturists in landscaping (1). Most research on loblolly-bay has been done by horticulturists interested in propagating it. In the Southeast, loblolly-bay is considered a handsome and hardy tree valued for its glossy dark-green leaves and abundant white flowers. Its wood has been used in cabinetmaking and its bark as a tanning agent (5). If the bark is steeped in warm water, it will dye both the container and water a rich carmine color.

Because of its ability to grow in wet bogs and flats where loblolly pine does poorly, loblolly-bay silviculture may offer a management alternative for such areas.

Laboratory papermaking tests conducted recently and other results reported in the literature (3,4) indicate that the pulp yield from loblolly-bay was acceptable (52 percent), the bulk of the paper was low (1.46 cm/g or 2.53 in/oz), and the strength acceptable. One laboratory test indicated a breaking length of 11,525 m (37,812 ft), a tensile strength of 10.2 kgf/15 mm (38.1 lbf/in), and a count of 836 folds using the Massachusetts Institute of Technology paper folding tester (1 kg or 2.2 lb). Although further testing needs to be done, these tests do not indicate any problems in making kraft paper from loblolly-bay pulp. Pulp mills in the lower Coastal Plain of South Carolina include loblolly-bay in their hardwood pulp.

== Literature cited ==
1. Bailey, L. H. 1928. Standard encyclopedia of horticulture. Vol 2. p. 1361. Macmillan, New York.
2. Eyre, F. H., ed. 1980. Forest cover types of the United States and Canada. Society of American Foresters, Washington, DC. 148 p.
3. Foreman, L. F. 1946. Kraft pulping of southern hardwoods. Paper Mill News 69(4):74.
4. Foreman, L. F., and D. D. Niemeyer. 1947. Kraft pulping of southern hardwoods. Technical Association of the Pulp and Paper Industry, Monograph Series 4. New York. p. 167-173.
5. Harrar, E. S. 1964. Hough's encyclopedia of American woods. vol. 4. p. 131-135. Robert Speller and Sons, New York.
6. Sargent, Charles Sprague. 1891–1902. Silva of North America. vol. 1. p. 41-44. Houghton Mifflin Co., Boston, MA.
7. U.S. Department of Agriculture, Soil Conservation Service. 1975. Soil taxonomy: a basic system of soil classification for making and interpreting soil surveys. Soil Survey Staff. U.S. Department of Agriculture, Agriculture Handbook 436. Washington, DC. 754 p.
8. U.S. Department of Commerce, Environmental Science Services Administration. 1968. Weather atlas of the United States. (1975 Reprinted Edition.) Gale Research Co., Detroit, MI. 262 p.
9. Wells, B. S. 1928. Plant communities of the Coastal Plain of North Carolina and their successional relations. Ecology 9:230-242.
10. Wells, B. W. 1932. The natural gardens of North Carolina. University of North Carolina Press, Chapel Hill. p. 67.
11. Wells, B. W., and S. G. Boyce. 1953. Carolina Bays: additional data on their origin and history. Journal of the Elisha Mitchell Society 69:119-141.
12. http://www.floridata.com/ref/g/gord_las.cfm

Gresham, Charles A.; Lipscomb, Donald J. (1990). "Gordonia lasianthus". In Burns, Russell M.; Honkala, Barbara H. (eds.). Hardwoods. Silvics of North America. Vol. 2. Washington, D.C.: United States Forest Service (USFS), United States Department of Agriculture (USDA) – via Southern Research Station.
