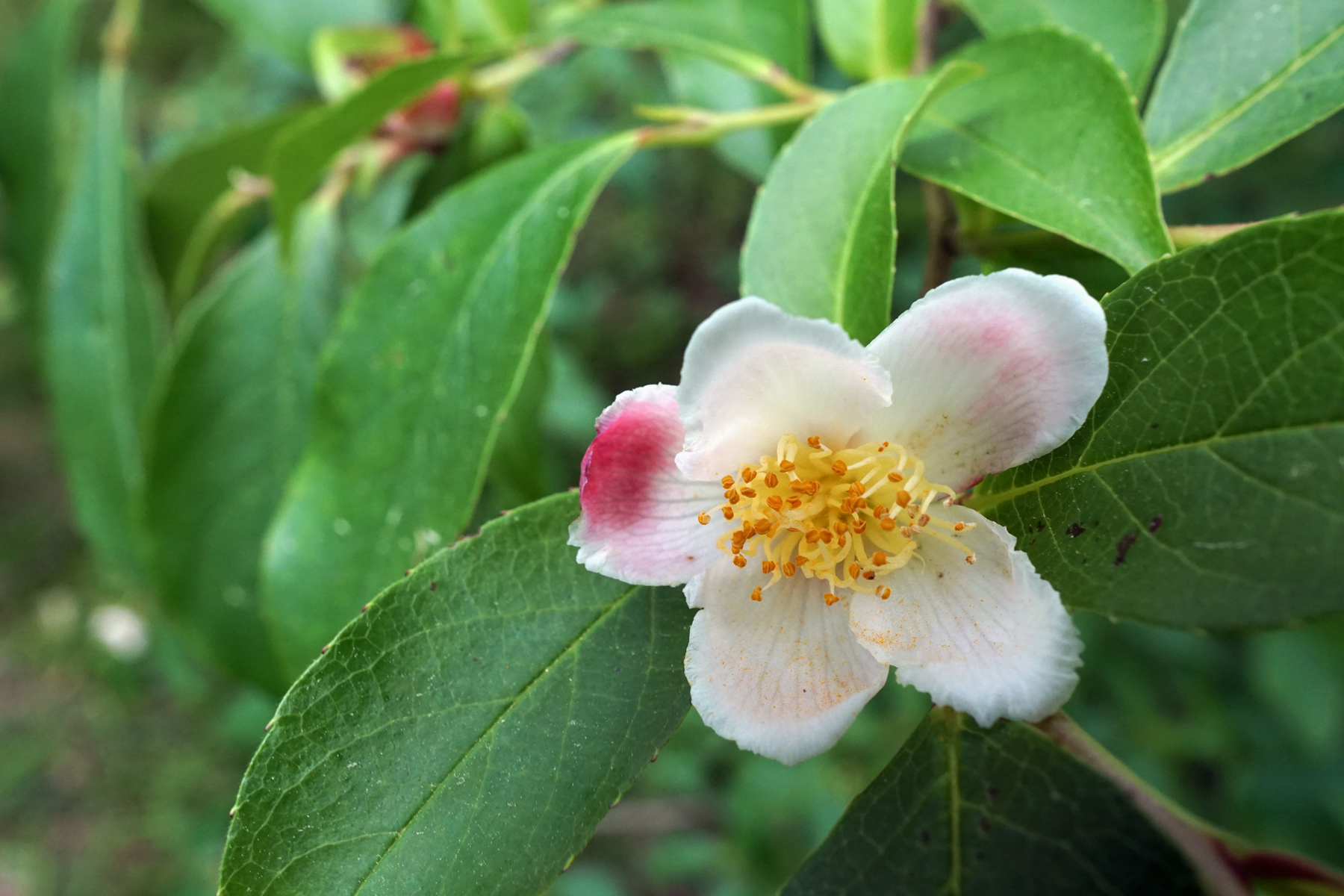
- Flower
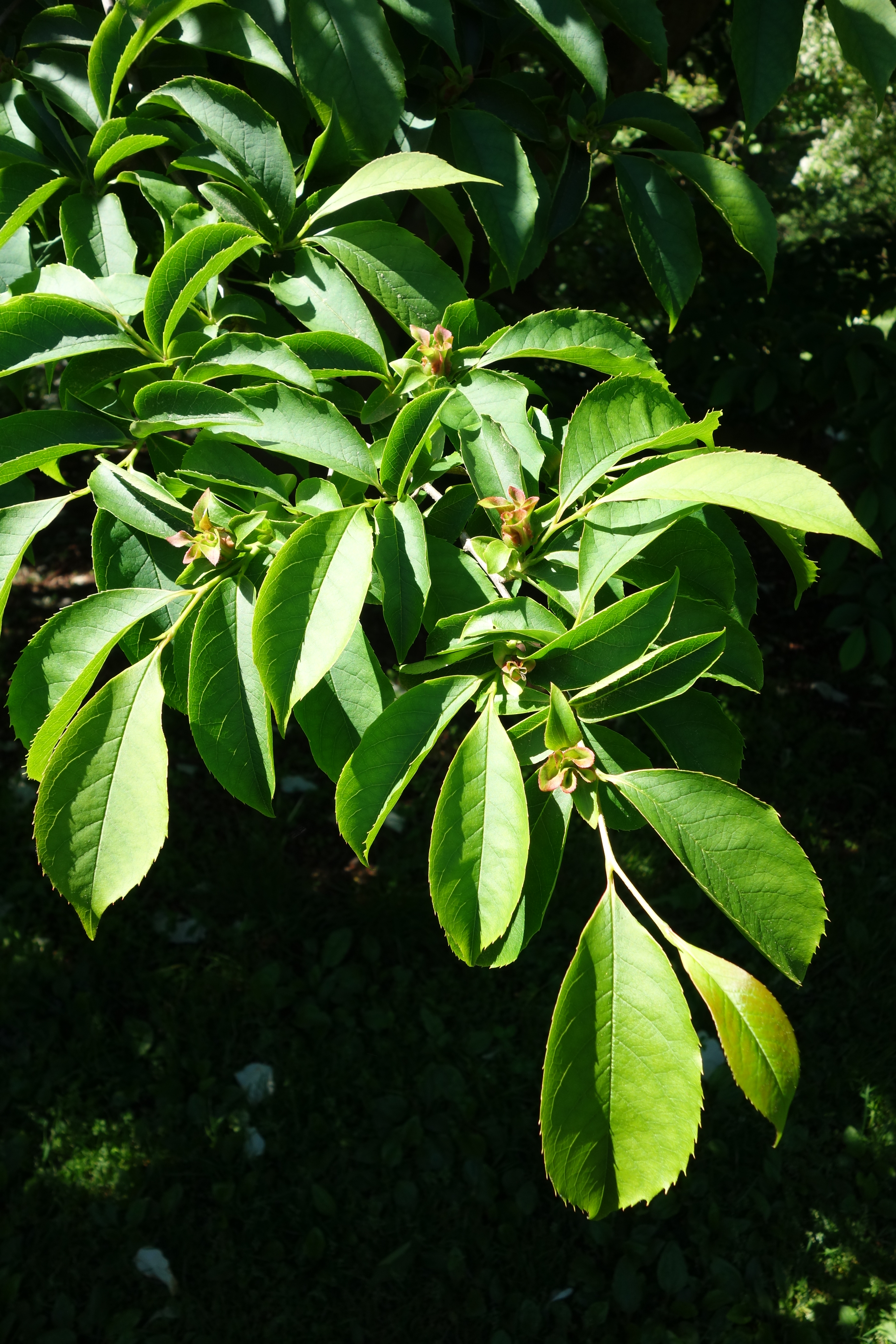
- Foliage

Scientific classification
- Kingdom: Plantae
- Clade: Embryophytes
- Clade: Tracheophytes
- Clade: Spermatophytes
- Clade: Angiosperms
- Clade: Eudicots
- Clade: Asterids
- Order: Ericales
- Family: Theaceae
- Genus: Stewartia
- Species: S. rostrata

Binomial name
- Stewartia rostrata Spongberg

Synonyms
- Stewartia glabra S.Z.Yan; Stewartia sinensis var. rostrata (Spongberg) Hung T.Chang

= Stewartia rostrata =

Species of flowering plant

Stewartia rostrata, the beaked stewartia, is a species of flowering plant in the family Theaceae, native to southeastern China. The Royal Horticultural Society considers it to be a good tree for smaller gardens.
