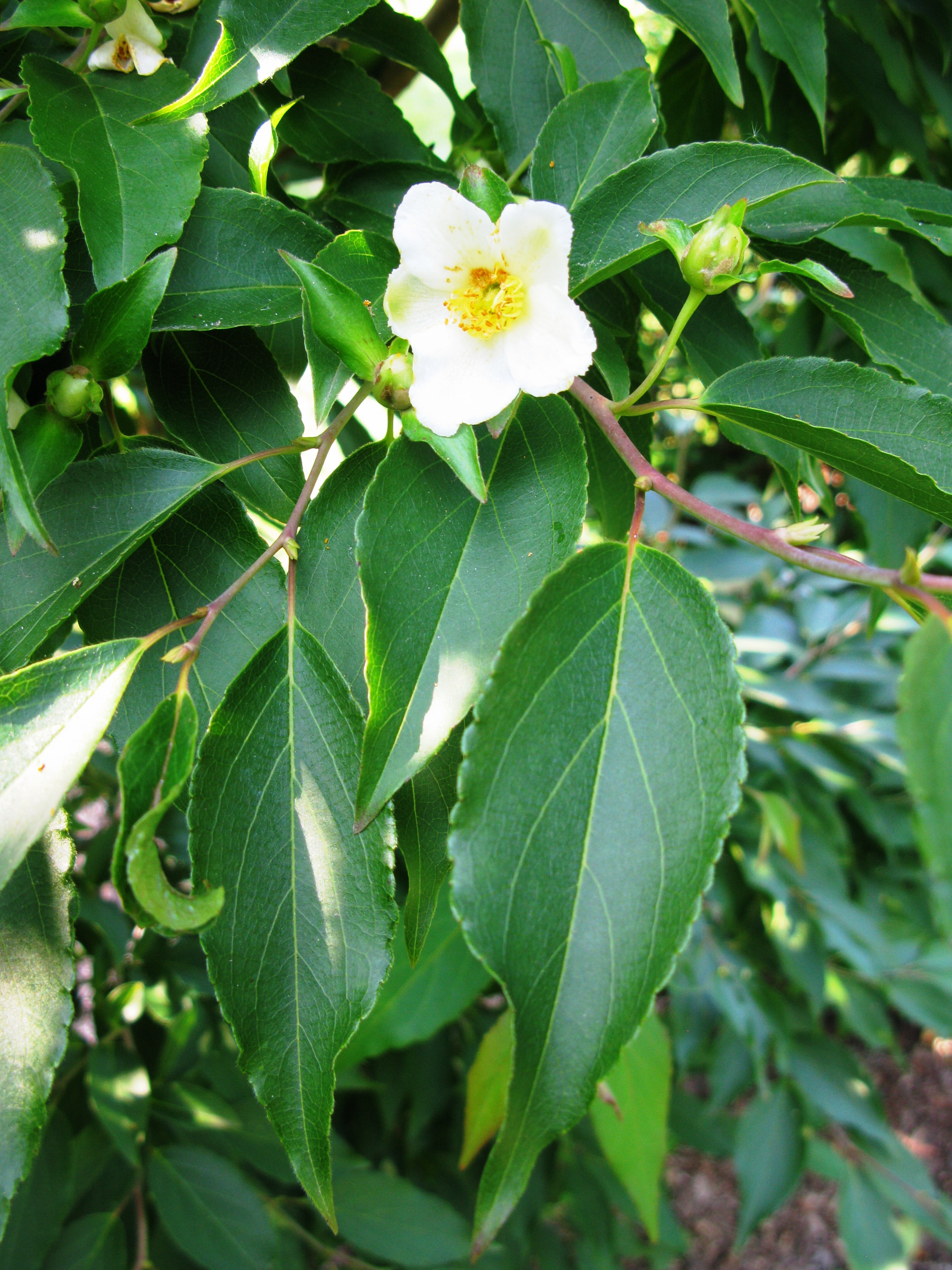

Conservation status
- Least Concern (IUCN 3.1)

Scientific classification
- Kingdom: Plantae
- Clade: Tracheophytes
- Clade: Angiosperms
- Clade: Eudicots
- Clade: Asterids
- Order: Ericales
- Family: Theaceae
- Genus: Stewartia
- Species: S. monadelpha

Binomial name
- Stewartia monadelpha Siebold & Zucc. (1841)

Synonyms
- Stewartia sericea (Nakai)

= Stewartia monadelpha =

Temperate rainforest plant

Stewartia monadelpha, known as tall stewartia or orangebark stewartia, is a deciduous shrub or multi-stemmed tree native to the temperate rainforests of Japan. Stewartia is a genus of flowering plants in the family Theaceae. The genus name Stewartia is in honor of the 18th century Scottish botanist, John Stuart.

== Distribution and habitat ==
Tall stewartia is endemic to Japan and primarily grows in cool, montane temperate rainforest zones; specifically, south-central Honshu, Kyushu and Shikoku islands. It is also cultivated in other countries as an ornamental plant.

== Description ==
Its appearance varies from a sturdy shrub to a small tree with orange or cinnamon-brown colored bark. It typically grows to a height of 20–25 ft (6.1–7.6 m) but has been known to reach 80 ft (24 m). As the plant matures its form changes from a pyramidal crown to become more open with horizontal branches reaching outwards. The dark green leaves are elliptic and oblong in shape and have serrated edges, growing to approximately 2–4 in (51–102 mm) long, and turn red in the autumn. In June, small cupped flowers appear, growing 1–1.5 in (25–38 mm) wide the flowers are white with yellow stamens, similar in appearance to camellia flowers.

== Ecology ==
This plant grows best in partial shade, but having an excellent heat tolerance, is able to grow well in full sunlight. In terms of soil, tall stewartia can tolerate well-drained clay, loam, sandy, and acidic soils.
