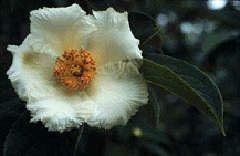
- Flower

Conservation status
- Least Concern (IUCN 3.1)

- Apparently Secure (NatureServe)

Scientific classification
- Kingdom: Plantae
- Clade: Tracheophytes
- Clade: Angiosperms
- Clade: Eudicots
- Clade: Asterids
- Order: Ericales
- Family: Theaceae
- Genus: Stewartia
- Species: S. ovata

Binomial name
- Stewartia ovata (Cav.) Weatherby 1939
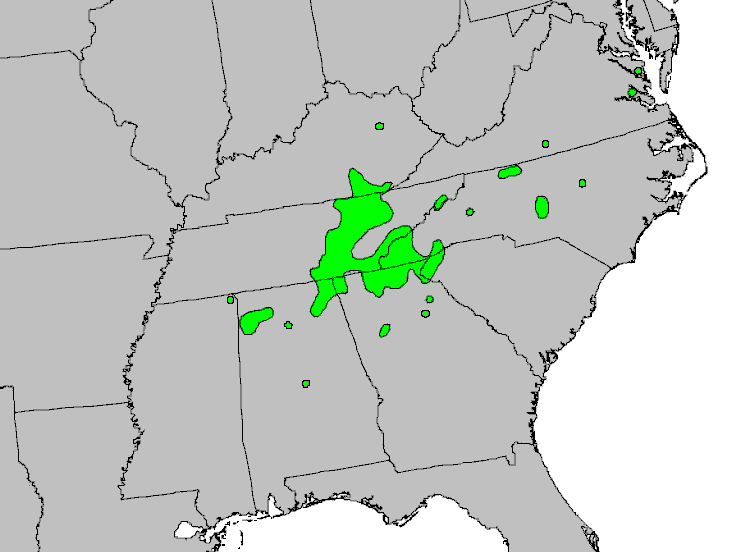
- Range

Synonyms
- Malachodendron ovatum Cav. 1787

= Stewartia ovata =

Species of tree

Stewartia ovata, known commonly as mountain camellia, is a small tree native to low to mid-elevations in the southern Appalachian Mountains and nearby regions from Mississippi to Virginia. It is a member of the Theaceae, the tea family.

Although not endangered, the plant does have a limited range and is uncommon throughout its range. Mountain camellia grows in the understory of predominantly hardwood forests and tends to be found near streams, usually at elevations below 800 m (2,600 ft).

== Description ==
Stewartia ovata is a deciduous flowering shrub or small tree growing to 5 meters (16 2/3 feet) tall, with smooth, flaking grayish-orange bark. The leaves are oval with an acute apex, 7–13 cm (2.8–5.1 in) long and 3–6 cm (1.2–2.4 in) broad, and turn orange, red, or gold when the tree becomes dormant in the fall. The flowers are camellia-like, 6–12 cm (2.4–4.7 in) in diameter, with five white petals and numerous white, yellow or purple stamens; they appear in early to mid-summer.

Varieties

There are two varieties:

- Stewartia ovata var. ovata — flowers 6–8 cm diameter, stamens white to yellow.
- Stewartia ovata var. grandiflora (W.J.Bean) Weatherby — flowers up to 12 cm diameter, stamens purple.
