= Gordonia villosa =

Conservation status
- Endangered (IUCN 2.3)

Scientific classification
- Kingdom: Plantae
- Clade: Tracheophytes
- Clade: Angiosperms
- Clade: Eudicots
- Clade: Asterids
- Order: Ericales
- Family: Theaceae
- Genus: Gordonia
- Species: G. villosa

Binomial name
- Gordonia villosa Macfad.

Synonyms
- Haemocharis villosa Choisy; Laplacea villosa (Macfad.) Griseb.; Wikstroemia macfadyenii S.F.Blake

Species of flowering plant

Gordonia villosa is a species of flowering plant in the family Theaceae. It is endemic to Jamaica.
