= Camellia tunghinensis =

Conservation status
- Vulnerable (IUCN 2.3)

Scientific classification
- Kingdom: Plantae
- Clade: Tracheophytes
- Clade: Angiosperms
- Clade: Eudicots
- Clade: Asterids
- Order: Ericales
- Family: Theaceae
- Genus: Camellia
- Species: C. tunghinensis

Binomial name
- Camellia tunghinensis H.T. Chang

Species of flowering plant

Camellia tunghinensis is a species of plant in the family Theaceae. It is endemic to China. It is threatened by habitat loss.
