= P. hirtella =

P. hirtella may refer to:

- Paralomis hirtella, a species of king crab
- Polyspora hirtella, a species of plant in the family Theaceae
