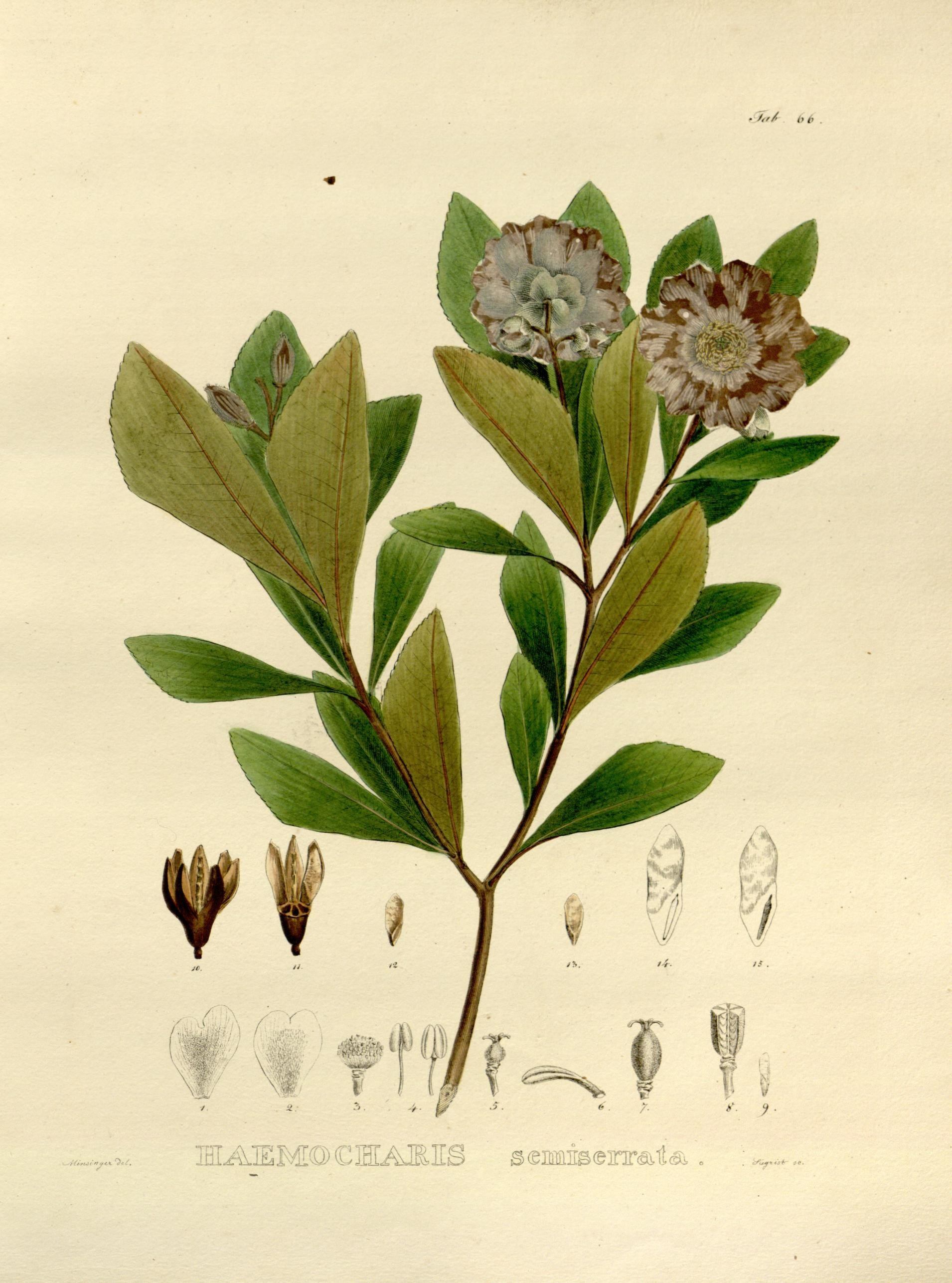

Scientific classification
- Kingdom: Plantae
- Clade: Tracheophytes
- Clade: Angiosperms
- Clade: Eudicots
- Clade: Asterids
- Order: Ericales
- Family: Theaceae
- Genus: Gordonia
- Species: G. fruticosa

Binomial name
- Gordonia fruticosa (Schrad.) H. Keng (1980)

Synonyms
- Synonyms list: Carpotroche angustifolia Pittier (1947); Gordonia humboldtii H.Keng (1980); Gordonia obovata (Wawra) H.Keng (1980); Gordonia planchonii H.Keng (1980); Gordonia semiserrata Spreng. (1827), nom. superfl.; Haemocharis camelliodes (Sond.) Kuntze (1891); Haemocharis caracasana Linden & Planch. (1863); Haemocharis dimidiata Mart. & Zucc. (1825); Haemocharis discolor Mart. & Zucc. (1825); Haemocharis intermedia (Benth.) Choisy (1855); Haemocharis obovata Mart. ex Wawra (1886); Haemocharis parviflora Choisy (1855); Haemocharis praemorsa (Splitg.) Kuntze (1891); Haemocharis pubescens (Planch. & Linden) Hieron. (1894); Haemocharis pubescens Linden & Planch. (1863); Haemocharis quinoderma (Wedd.) Choisy (1855); Haemocharis semiserrata Mart. (1826), nom. superfl.; Haemocharis semiserrata var. communis Pulle (1906); Haemocharis speciosa (Kunth) Choisy (1855); Haemocharis symplocoides (Triana & Planch.) Kuntze (1891); Laplacea cameliifolia Triana & Planch. (1862); Laplacea camenioides Sond. (1849); Laplacea fruticosa (Schrad.) Kobuski (1947); Laplacea fruticosa var. chimantae Steyerm. (1987); Laplacea fruticosa var. pulcherrima (Melch.) Kobuski (1950); Laplacea fruticosa var. sericea (Wawra) Kobuski (1950); Laplacea fruticosa var. symplocoides (Triana & Planch.) Kobuski (1950); Laplacea inaequalilatera Schott (1827); Laplacea intermedia Benth. (1843); Laplacea obovata (Wawra) Kobuski (1950); Laplacea parviflora Mart. (1823), nom. nud.; Laplacea praemorsa Splitg. (1842); Laplacea pubescens Planch. & Linden (1862); Laplacea pubescens var. camelliifolia (Triana & Planch.) Kobuski (1950); Laplacea pubescens var. minor Steyerm. (1987); Laplacea pubescens var. subcaudata Kobuski (1950); Laplacea pulcherrima Melch. (1925); Laplacea quinoderma Wedd. (1849); Laplacea raimondiana Melch. (1925); Laplacea semiserrata Cambess. (1828), nom. superfl.; Laplacea semiserrata var. communis Wawra (1886); Laplacea semiserrata var. microphylla Wawra (1886); Laplacea semiserrata var. obovata Wawra (1886); Laplacea semiserrata var. sericea Wawra (1886); Laplacea semiserrata var. typica Wawra (1886), not validly publ.; Laplacea speciosa Kunth (1822); Laplacea speciosa var. intermedia (Benth.) Kobuski (1950); Laplacea symplocoides Triana & Planch. (1862); Laplacea tomentosa G.Don (1831); Laplacea tomentosa var. glabrata Wawra (1886); Laplacea tomentosa var. typica Wawra (1886), not validly publ.; Lindleya semiserrata Nees (1821); Lindleya semiserrata Nees (1821), nom. superfl.; Wikstroemia camelliifolia (Triana & Planch.) S.F.Blake (1918); Wikstroemia fruticosa Schrad. (1821) (basionym); Wikstroemia fruticosa var. acutifolia S.F.Blake (1918); Wikstroemia fruticosa var. communis S.F.Blake (1918); Wikstroemia fruticosa var. microphylla S.F.Blake (1918); Wikstroemia fruticosa var. obovata S.F.Blake (1918); Wikstroemia fruticosa var. sericea S.F.Blake (1918); Wikstroemia fruticosa var. typica S.F.Blake (1918), not validly publ.; Wikstroemia intermedia (Benth.) S.F.Blake (1918); Wikstroemia parviflora (Choisy) S.F.Blake (1918); Wikstroemia pubescens (Planch. & Linden) S.F.Blake (1918); Wikstroemia quinoderma (Wedd.) S.F.Blake (1918); Wikstroemia speciosa (Kunth) S.F.Blake (1918); Wikstroemia symplocoides (Triana & Planch.) S.F.Blake (1918)

= Gordonia fruticosa =

Species of tree

Gordonia fruticosa is a species of shrub or tree in the family Theaceae. It is native to Central and South America, ranging from Honduras to Bolivia and southern Brazil.

== Description ==
The shrub grows to a height of up to 4 m. Its leaves are light green with serrated edges. Its flowers are white.
