= Gordonia curtyana =

Conservation status
- Critically Endangered (IUCN 2.3)

Scientific classification
- Kingdom: Plantae
- Clade: Tracheophytes
- Clade: Angiosperms
- Clade: Eudicots
- Clade: Asterids
- Order: Ericales
- Family: Theaceae
- Genus: Gordonia
- Species: G. curtyana

Binomial name
- Gordonia curtyana (A.Rich.) H.Keng

Synonyms
- Laplacea curtyana A.Rich.

Species of flowering plant

Gordonia curtyana is a species of plant in the family Theaceae. It is endemic to Cuba. It is threatened by habitat loss.
