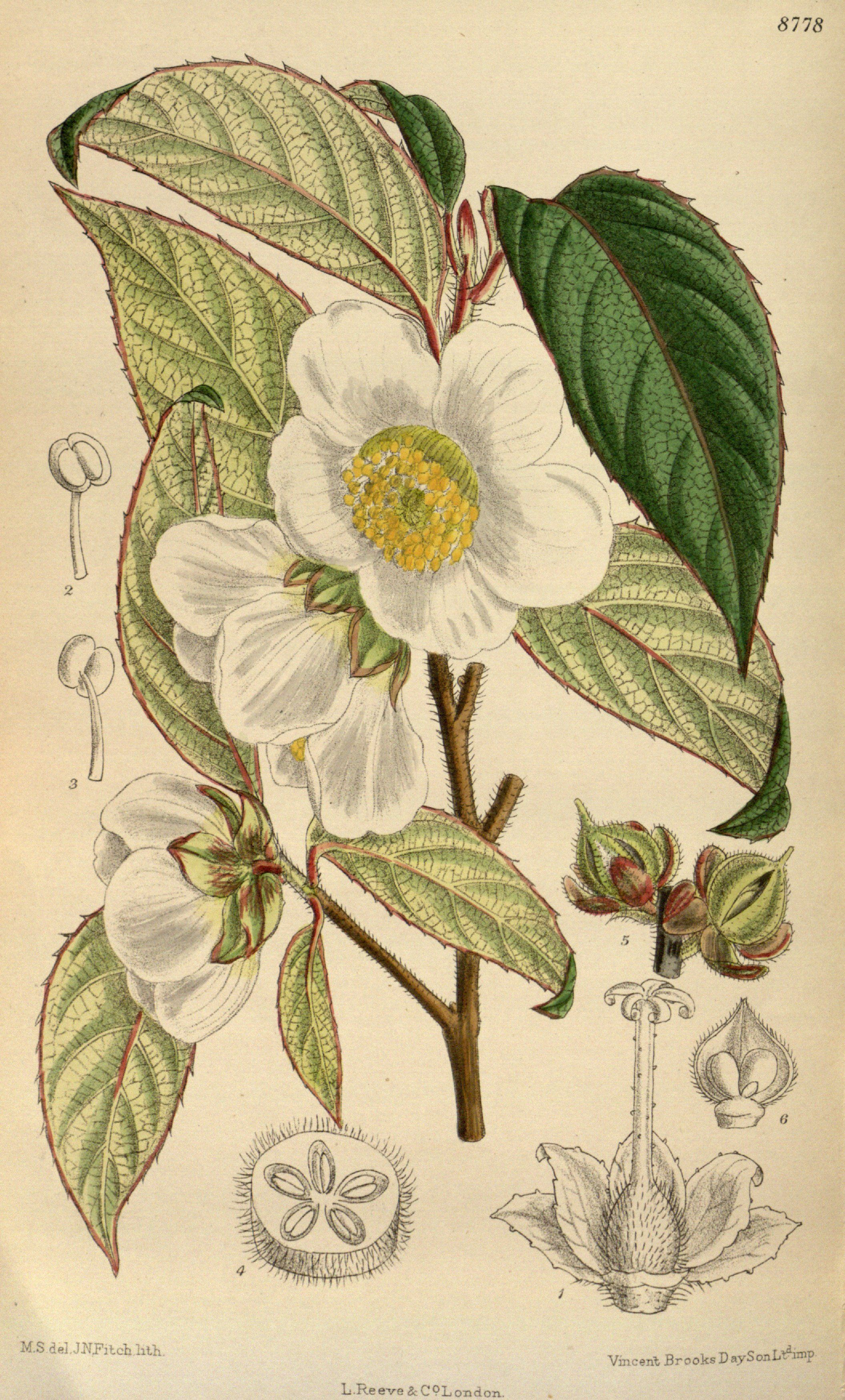

Scientific classification
- Kingdom: Plantae
- Clade: Tracheophytes
- Clade: Angiosperms
- Clade: Eudicots
- Clade: Asterids
- Order: Ericales
- Family: Theaceae
- Genus: Stewartia
- Species: S. sinensis

Binomial name
- Stewartia sinensis Rehder & E.H.Wilson

= Stewartia sinensis =

Species of flowering plant

Stewartia sinensis, the Chinese stewartia, is a species of flowering plant in the camellia family Theaceae, native to central and eastern China. It is typically a small deciduous tree, growing to about 9 m (30 ft) tall. In its native forests, S. sinensis has been known to achieve a maximum height of 20 m (66 ft) tall by 7 m (23 ft) broad.

In the UK Stewartia sinensis has gained the Royal Horticultural Society's Award of Garden Merit.
