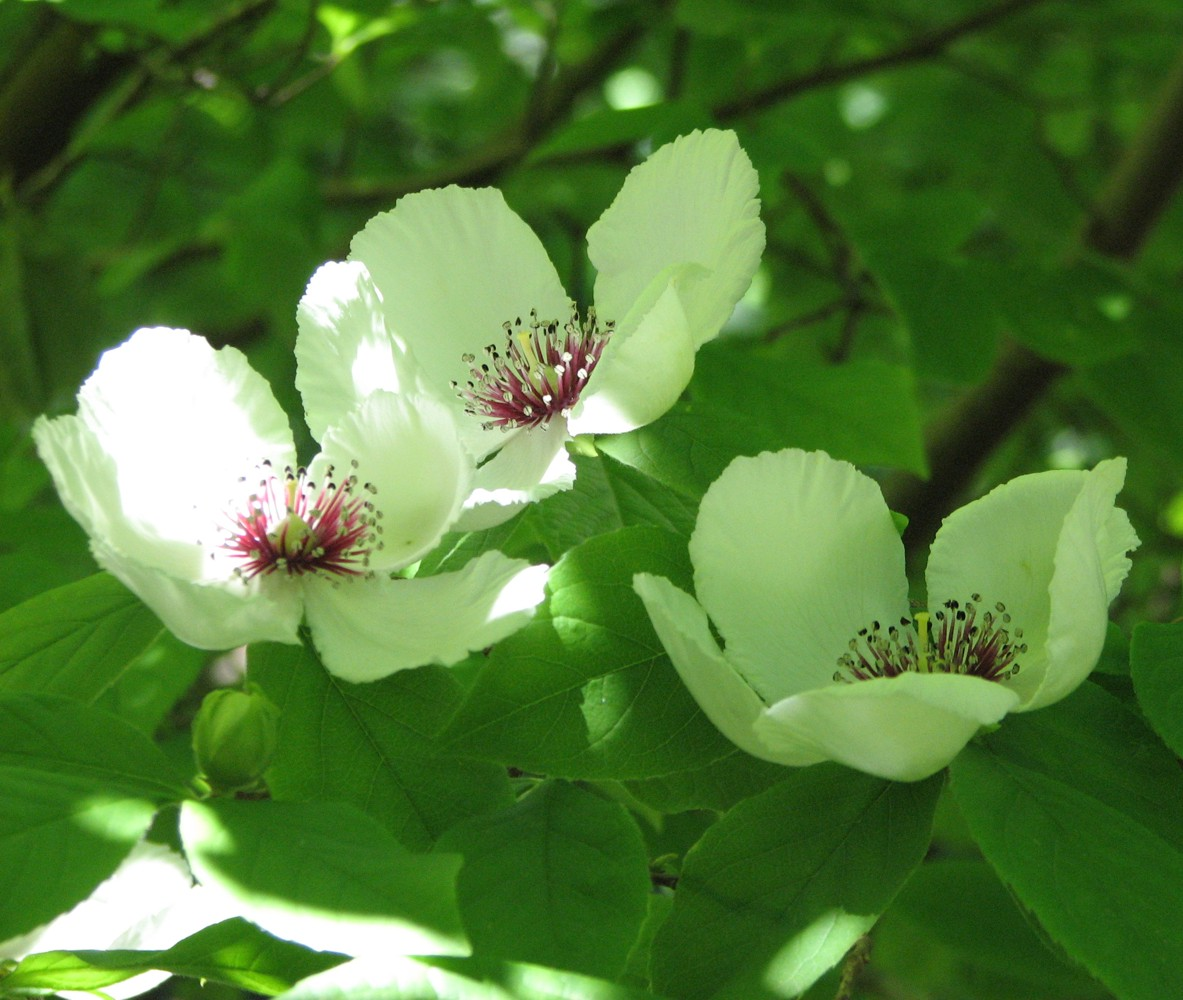

Conservation status
- Least Concern (IUCN 3.1)

Scientific classification
- Kingdom: Plantae
- Clade: Embryophytes
- Clade: Tracheophytes
- Clade: Spermatophytes
- Clade: Angiosperms
- Clade: Eudicots
- Clade: Asterids
- Order: Ericales
- Family: Theaceae
- Genus: Stewartia
- Species: S. malacodendron

Binomial name
- Stewartia malacodendron L. (1753)
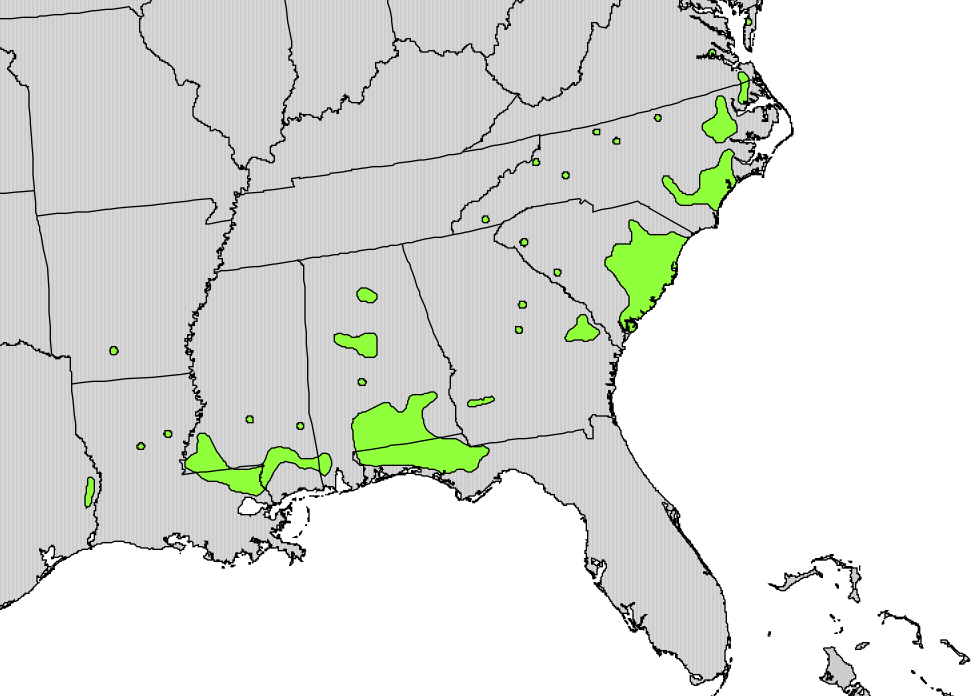
- Natural range

Synonyms
- Cavanilla florida Salisb. (1796); Malachodendron monogynum Dum.Cours. (1811); Stewartia marilandica Andrews (1804); Stewartia nobilis Salisb. (1796), nom. superfl.; Stewartia virginica Cav. (1788)

= Stewartia malacodendron =

Species of flowering plant

Stewartia malacodendron, the silky camellia, silky stewartia or Virginia stewartia, is a species of flowering plant in the family Theaceae. It grows slowly into a large deciduous shrub or small tree, typically 3–4.5 m (10–15 ft) tall, but sometimes as tall as 9 m (30 ft). It is native to the southeastern United States.

The Latin specific epithet malacodendron literally means "soft tree". Its common name "silky camellia" alludes to the appearance and texture of the flowers, which resemble those of the related camellias.

== Description ==
=== Branches and leaves ===
Stewartia malacodendron is an understory woodland species with rich brown bark. The young stems are hairy. The branches tend to grow with a horizontal orientation from the main stem with the foliage produced on shorter stems branching off these horizontally oriented branches. The alternately arranged, dark green, simple leaves are 50 to 100 mm (2.0 to 3.9 in) long with finely toothed margins covered with fine hairs on the undersides, especially on the veins. The leaves are ovate to elliptical in shape with sharp pointed tips.

=== Buds and flowers ===
The buds are covered by two floral bracts with silvery hairs. The flowers are 60–90 mm (2.4–3.5 in) wide, showy, with five white petals. The stamens have purple filaments and blue anthers that fill the middle of flat, cup shaped corollas. The flowers are born singly from the leaf axils on short stalks with two floral bracts (2–4 mm long) that remain after flowering. The flowers have five green sepals, 8–11 mm long and 5–9 mm wide. Stewartia malacodendron blooms in July and August in the northern part of its range and in April in the southern part of its range.

=== Seeds ===
Rounded, woody seed capsules are produced after flowering, each capsule with 4-5 chambers, and if fertilized, each chamber has 2-4 seeds. The shiny, wingless seeds are full, ovoid in shape and purplish to reddish-brown in color; each seed is 5–7 mm long and 4–6 mm wide.

== Range and habitat ==
Stewartia malacodendron is native to Texas, where it is rare, being found in a small area along Little Cow Creek near Burkeville, growing at the sides of streams, ravines and wooded bluffs in well draining soils. It is also found in scattered locations in the states of Arkansas, Georgia, Florida (panhandle region), Louisiana and southern Alabama and as far north as Virginia. This tree species is listed as endangered in the US states of Arkansas and Florida.

== Cultivation ==
Plants have a slow growth rate, are difficult to transplant and are a challenge to propagate. They grow best in partial shade in well draining soils.

Stewartia malacodendron has been cultivated in the United States since 1752. It is also grown in parks and gardens elsewhere in the temperate regions of the world, and in the UK has gained the Royal Horticultural Society's Award of Garden Merit.
