= Stewartia rubiginosa =

Scientific classification
- Kingdom: Plantae
- Clade: Tracheophytes
- Clade: Angiosperms
- Clade: Eudicots
- Clade: Asterids
- Order: Ericales
- Family: Theaceae
- Genus: Stewartia
- Species: S. rubiginosa

Binomial name
- Stewartia rubiginosa Hung T.Chang

Species of flowering plant

Stewartia rubiginosa is a species of flowering plant in the family Theaceae. It is a tree and native to China.
