= Polyspora maingayi =

Conservation status
- Vulnerable (IUCN 2.3)

Scientific classification
- Kingdom: Plantae
- Clade: Tracheophytes
- Clade: Angiosperms
- Clade: Eudicots
- Clade: Asterids
- Order: Ericales
- Family: Theaceae
- Genus: Polyspora
- Species: P. maingayi

Binomial name
- Polyspora maingayi (Dyer) Orel, Peter G.Wilson, Curry & Luu

Synonyms
- Gordonia maingayi Dyer 1874; Lasianthus maingayi (Dyer) Kuntze 1891; Nabiasodendron maingayi (Dyer) Pit. 1902

Species of tree

Polyspora maingayi is a species of plant in the family Theaceae. It is a tree endemic to Peninsular Malaysia. It is threatened by habitat loss.
