= Johann Andreas Cramer =

Johann Andreas Cramer (14 December 1710 – 6 December 1777) was a German metallurgist and chemist who published some of the early ideas on metallurgy and chemistry in his books which included Elementa Artis Docimasticae (1741).

Cramer was born in Quedlinburg where his father was a businessman involved in the iron ore industry. As a child he travelled to mines in the Harz region along with his father and after the death of his father he was taken care of by his brother-in-law Christian George Schwalbe (1691-1791). Schwalbe was a physician with a circle of acquaintances who included chemists and botanists including Linnaeus. Cramer studied law for a semester at Hamburg before moving to Halle to study medicine in 1726. His teachers included George Ernst Stahl (1659-1734). He did not complete his medical studies and took an interest mainly in the chemistry subjects and them moved back to study law while attending chemistry courses at Halle by Juncker and Peter Gericke (1693–1750). He graduated and worked as a lawyer in Blankenburg, but continued to work on metallurgy. He moved to Helmstedt in 1734 and attended chemistry courses by Gericke. He also set up a laboratory at home began to train in assaying. He became acquainted with Gottfried Jacob Jänisch (1707–1781) who helped Cramer to move to Leiden where he also had a friend in Carl Linnaeus. Cramer moved to Leiden and met with several scholars in a "society of gentlemen" including Jan Frederik Gronovius, Linnaeus, Herman Boerhaave, Gerard van Swieten (1700–1772), and Isaac Lawson (1704–1747). Lawson hired Cramer for his laboratory and helped in the writing of Elementa Artis Docimasticae published first in 1741.

Cramer used the idea of "menstrua", an idea of a substance that he defined as ".. which being applied to others according to certain Rules, dissolve them so as to adhere themselves in a State of Division to the Particles of the Body dissolved, and cannot separate from them again of their own accord." These included what are now called fluxes including lead and arsenic.

Cramer died at Berggieshübel near Dresden.
