= Polyspora singaporeana =

Conservation status
- Vulnerable (IUCN 3.1)

Scientific classification
- Kingdom: Plantae
- Clade: Tracheophytes
- Clade: Angiosperms
- Clade: Eudicots
- Clade: Asterids
- Order: Ericales
- Family: Theaceae
- Genus: Polyspora
- Species: P. singaporeana

Binomial name
- Polyspora singaporeana (Wall. ex Ridley) Niissalo & L.M.Choo

Synonyms
- Gordonia singaporeana Wall. ex Ridl. 1916; Gordonia excelsa var. sincapuriana Dyer 1874; Gordonia grandis King 1890

Species of tree

Polyspora singaporeana is a species of plant in the family Theaceae. It is a tree found in Peninsular Malaysia and Singapore. It is threatened by habitat loss.
