= Apterosperma =

Conservation status
- Critically Endangered (IUCN 3.1)

Scientific classification
- Kingdom: Plantae
- Clade: Tracheophytes
- Clade: Angiosperms
- Clade: Eudicots
- Clade: Asterids
- Order: Ericales
- Family: Theaceae
- Genus: Apterosperma; Hung T.Chang
- Species: A. oblata

Binomial name
- Apterosperma oblata Hung T.Chang

Species of plant

Apterosperma is a monotypic genus of flowering plants in the family Theaceae. The sole species is Apterosperma oblata, which is endemic to Guangdong and Guangxi in southeastern China. The species is threatened by habitat loss.
