= Polyspora taipingensis =

Conservation status
- Near Threatened (IUCN 3.1)

Scientific classification
- Kingdom: Plantae
- Clade: Tracheophytes
- Clade: Angiosperms
- Clade: Eudicots
- Clade: Asterids
- Order: Ericales
- Family: Theaceae
- Genus: Polyspora
- Species: P. taipingensis

Binomial name
- Polyspora taipingensis (Burkill) Orel, Peter G.Wilson, Curry & Luu (2013)

Synonyms
- Gordonia taipingensis Burkill (1917)

Species of plant

Polyspora taipingensis is a species of plant in the family Theaceae. It is a tree endemic to Peninsular Malaysia. It is threatened by habitat loss.
