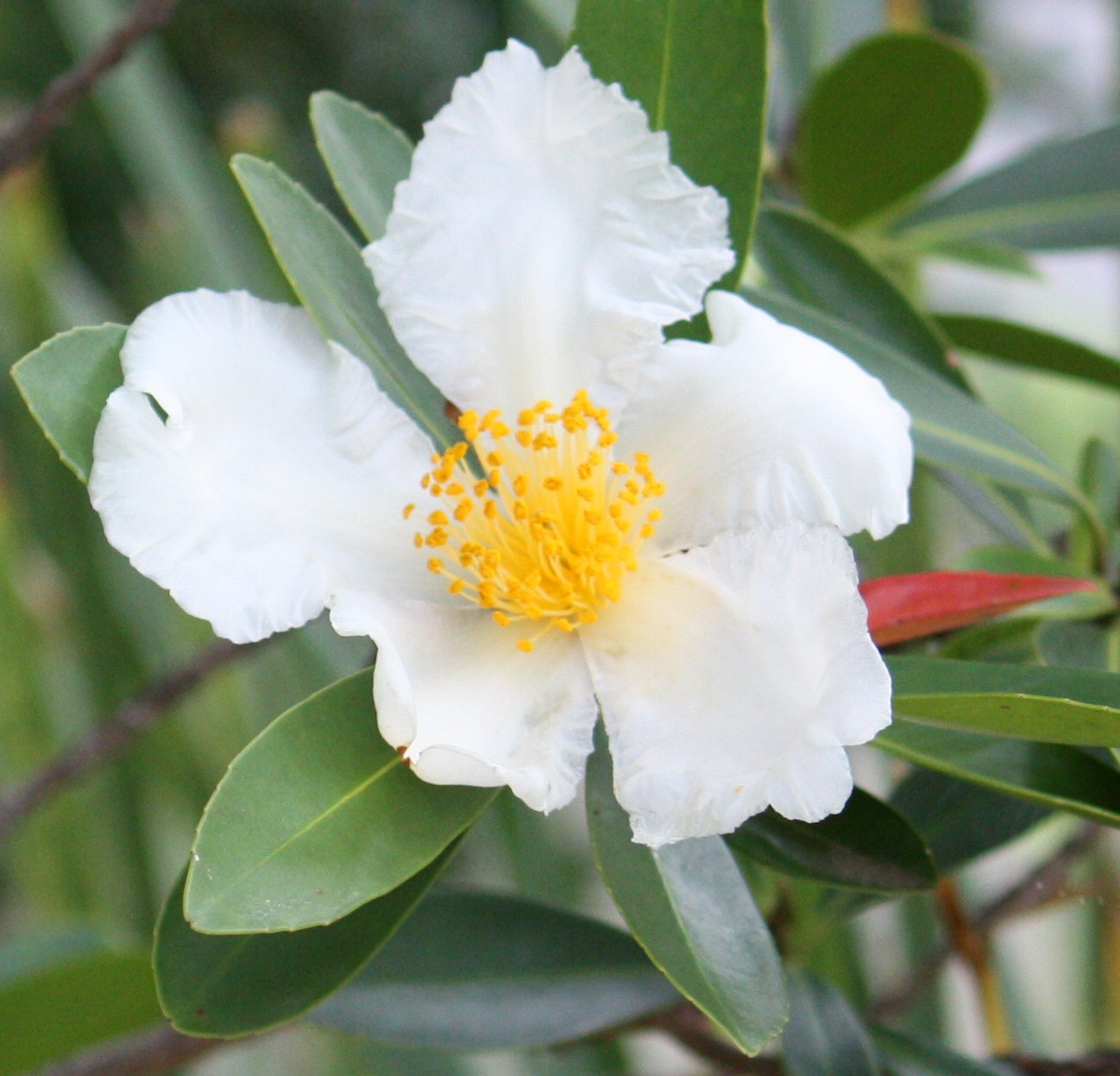

Conservation status
- Least Concern (IUCN 3.1)

Scientific classification
- Kingdom: Plantae
- Clade: Embryophytes
- Clade: Tracheophytes
- Clade: Spermatophytes
- Clade: Angiosperms
- Clade: Eudicots
- Clade: Asterids
- Order: Ericales
- Family: Theaceae
- Genus: Polyspora
- Species: P. axillaris

Binomial name
- Polyspora axillaris (Roxburgh ex Ker Gawler) Sweet

Synonyms
- List: Camellia axillaris; Gordonia axillaris; Castanopsis camelliifolia; Gordonia anomala; Gordonia shimadae; Gordonia tagawae; Gordonia tonkinensis; Polyspora shimidae; Polyspora tagawae; Polyspora tonkinensis; Franklinia axillaris

= Polyspora axillaris =

Species of tree

Polyspora axillaris is a species of evergreen tree or shrub that can grow up to 9 m tall. It is commonly known as fried egg plant or fried egg tree for its white and yellow flower. The species is found in southern China, including Hong Kong and Hainan, Taiwan and Vietnam. It is a garden tree all over the world.

While earlier grouped under Gordonia, the genus Polyspora has been found to be not closely related to the North American species, thus transferring the species to its own genus.

== Description ==
The species is a evergreen tree that can reach up to 8 metres in height. Its bark is smooth and orange-brown, while the branchlets are stout and densely covered with fine hairs.The leaf blades are leathery, dull and hairless on the upper surface, and pale green beneath with a prominent midvein. They range in shape from oblong-ovate to oblanceolate, with rounded or blunt tips and a cuneate, slightly decurrent base. The margins are usually entire, occasionally showing slight crenations near the apex, and the lateral veins are indistinct. Flowers are large, borne singly or in pairs, with five white petals and numerous yellow stamens. The fruit is an oblong to oblong-ovoid capsule containing compressed, winged seeds.

=== Lifecycle ===
The species flowers from September to October, and fruits from November to December.

== Distribution ==
This species is distributed in southern China (Hainan, Hong Kong, Guangxi, and Guangdong), as well as in Taiwan and Vietnam. It occurs at elevations ranging from approximately 100 to 2,300 meters above sea level.

Polyspora axillaris grows on hillsides, and is adapted to holding on to slopes while being exposed to rain and storms. Although the species is abundant in Hong Kong, previous studies have noted that this species exhibits a strongly clustered distribution pattern due to its relatively heavy seeds as a wind-dispersed tree. This species can become dominant in shrublands and in the early-successional secondary forests, though not in lowland.

== Ecology ==
The flowers are fragrant and attract pollinators such as bees and butterflies. Some blooms develop in the leaf axils, which is reflected in the species name P. axillaris. The flowers detach from the tree before they begin to wilt.

While high concentration of aluminum ions is toxic to most plants, this species can endure high concentrations of aluminum ions by accumulating them in its leafs and roots through the reaction with fluoride ions.

== Reforestation ==
During the early stages of reforestation in Hong Kong, fast-growing exotic species such as Acacia confusa and Casuarina equisetifolia were widely planted as framework trees to quickly restore degraded soils and stabilize barren landscapes. Although effective in improving the soil, these non-native species provided limited support for local biodiversity. To address this issue, the government introduced the Country Parks Plantation Enrichment Programme in 2009, aiming to gradually replace exotic plantations with native tree species. P. axillaris has since been selected as a key framework tree for its strong adaptability and its importance as a winter food source for vespids wasps. Other native species selected includes Castanopsis fissa and Schima superba.

== Gallery ==
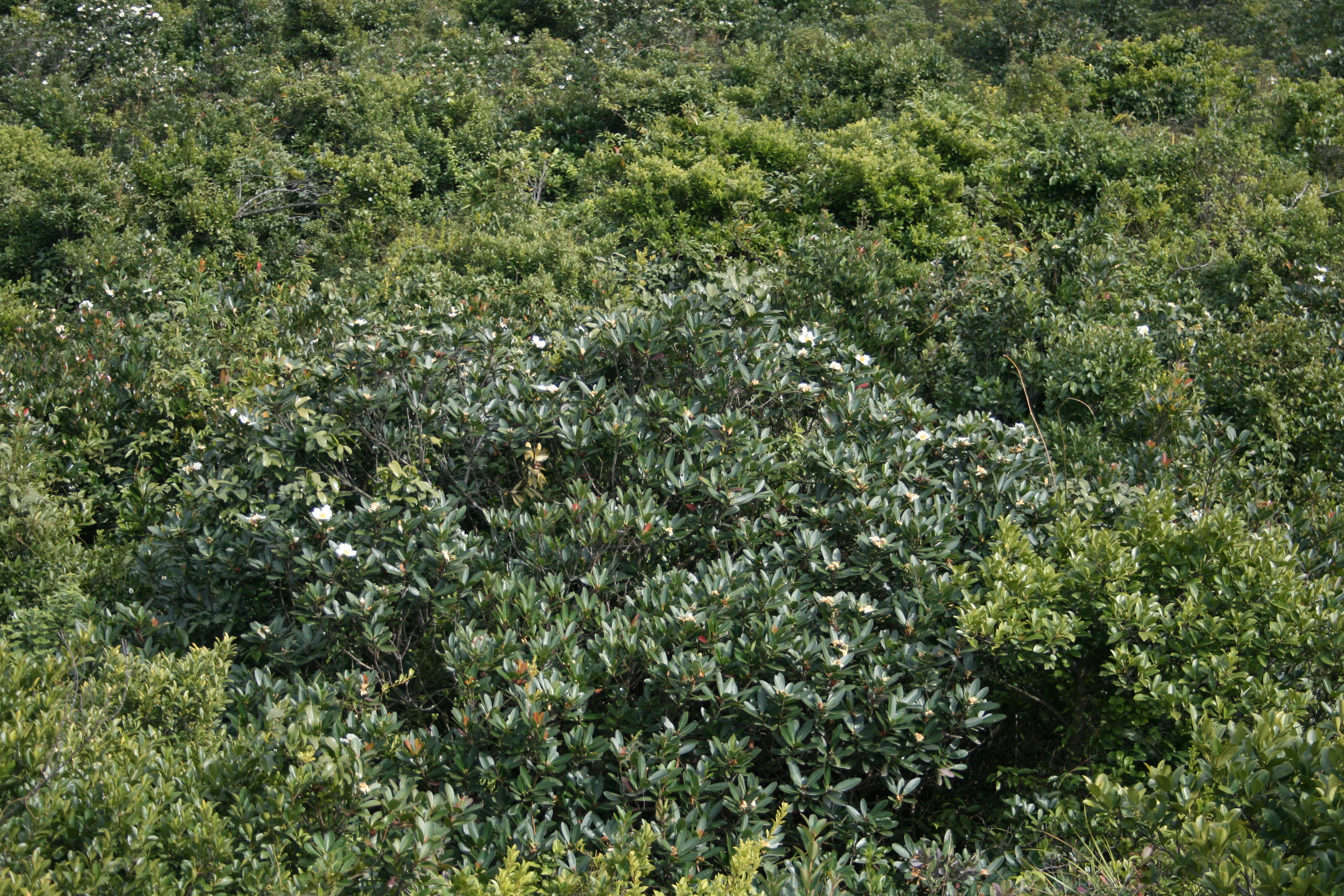
In its natural habitat

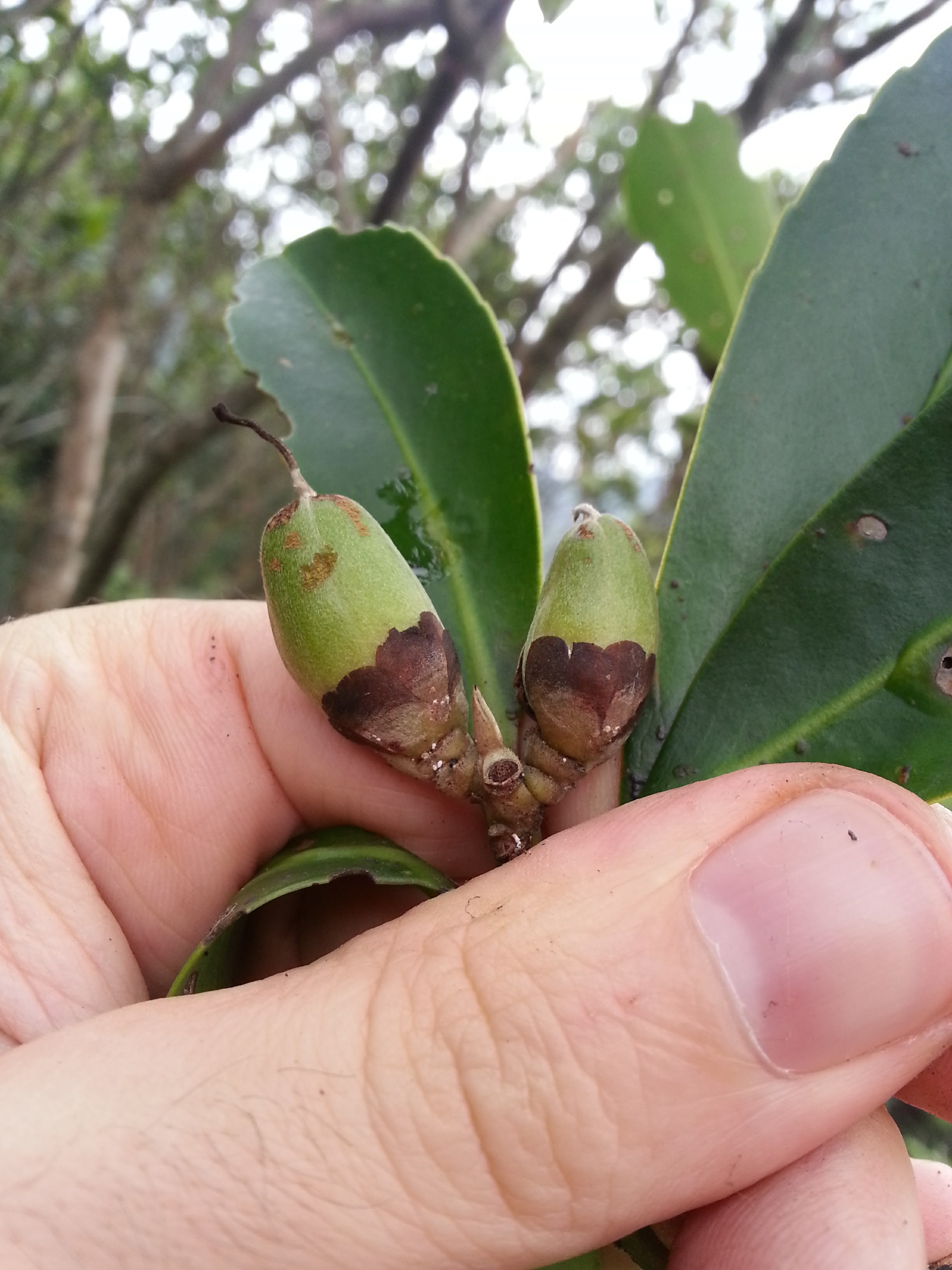
Fruit

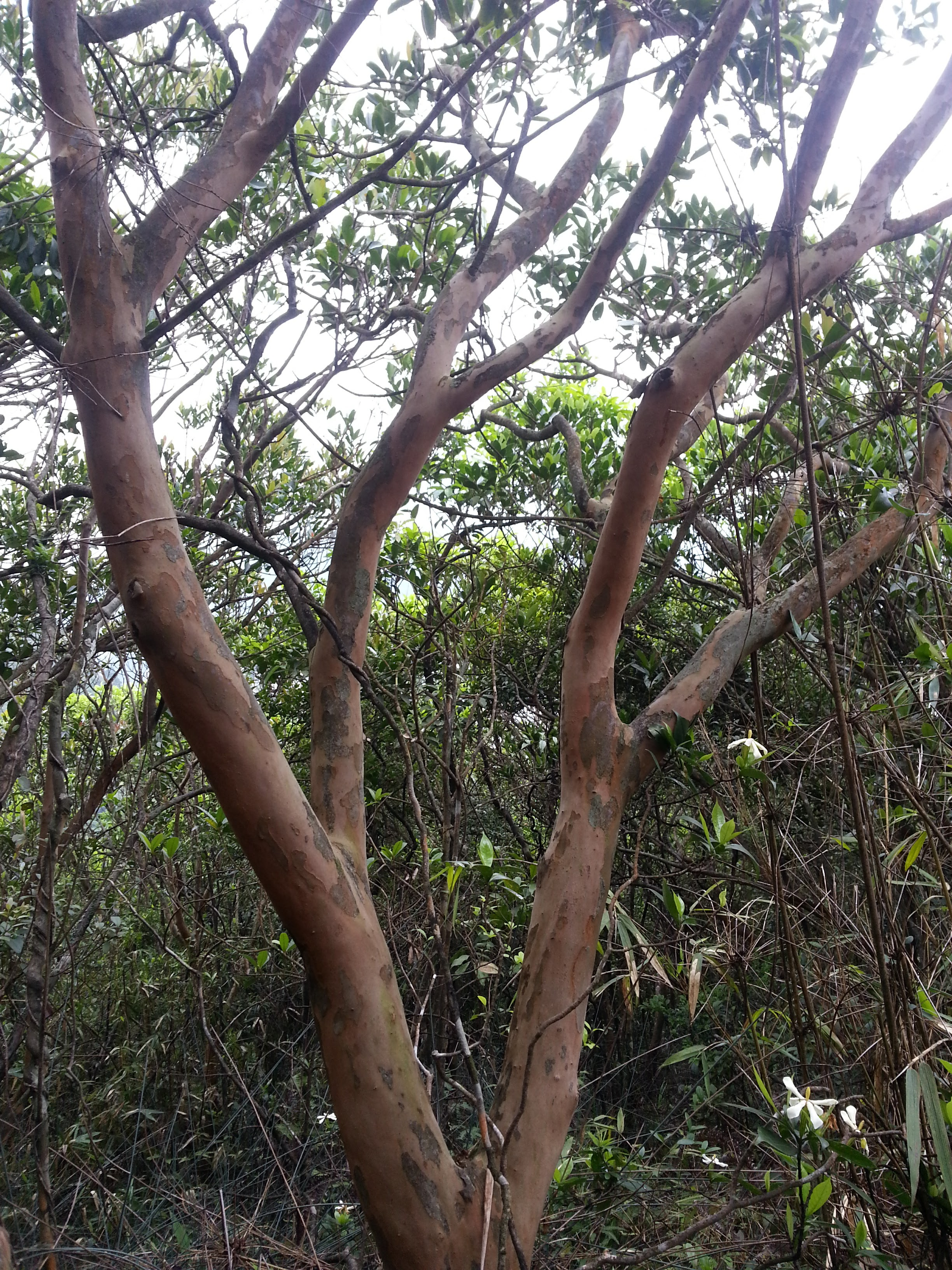
Natural form

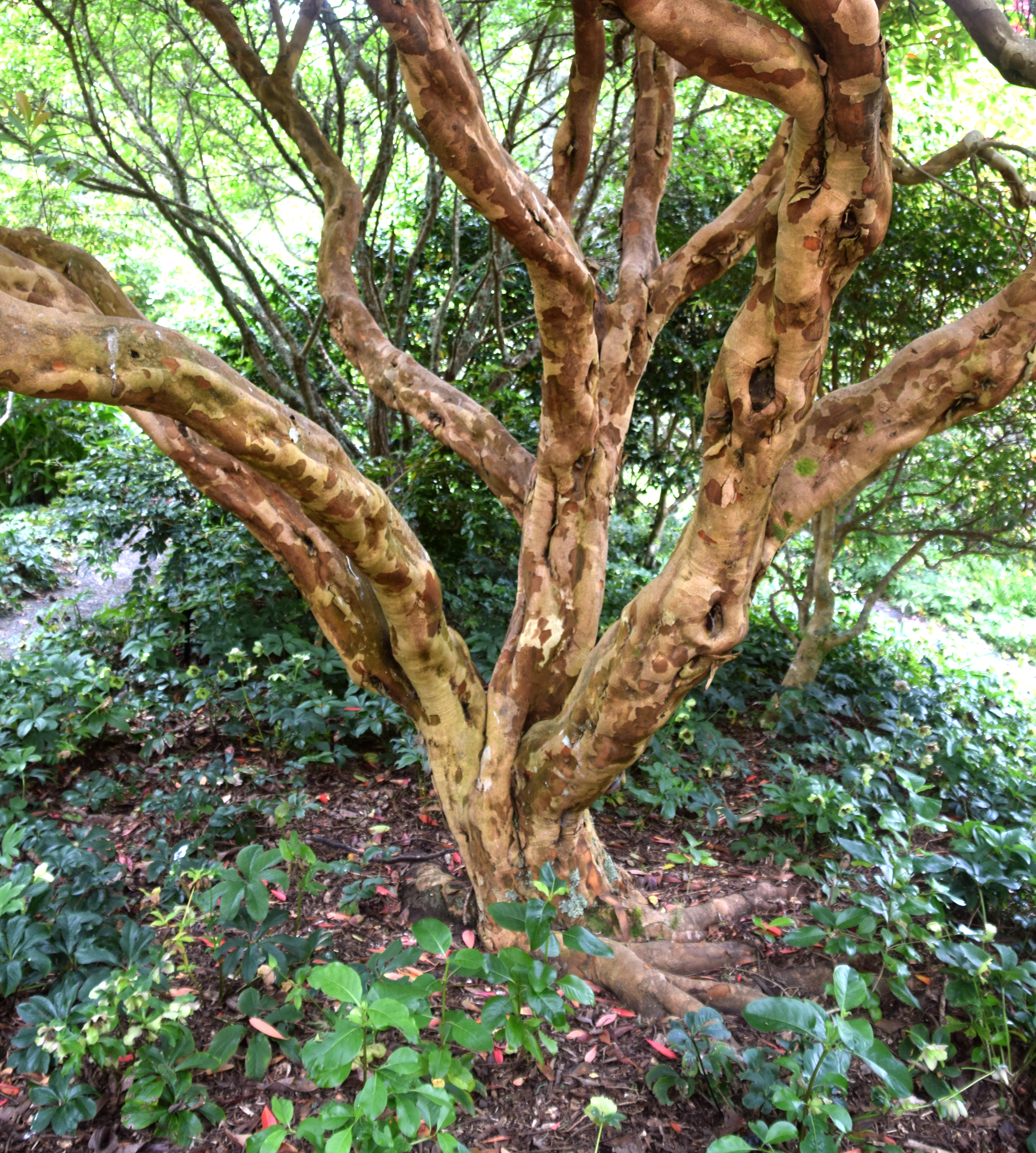
Cultivated specimen
