= Spinasterol =

α-Spinasterol

Names
- IUPAC name (22E)-5α-Stigmasta-7,22-dien-3β-ol
- Systematic IUPAC name (1R,3aR,5aS,7S,9aS,9bR,11aR)-1-[(2R,3E,5S)-5-Ethyl-6-methylhept-3-en-2-yl]-9a,11a-dimethyl-2,3,3a,5,5a,6,7,8,9,9a,9b,10,11,11a-tetradecahydro-1H-cyclopenta[a]phenanthren-7-ol
- Other names α-Spinasterin; Bessisterol; Hitodesterol

Identifiers
CAS Number	481-18-5
3D model (JSmol)	Interactive image
ChemSpider	4444708
PubChem CID	5281331
UNII	0LG993QX1A
CompTox Dashboard (EPA)	DTXSID801044364
- InChI: InChI=1S/C29H48O/c1-7-21(19(2)3)9-8-20(4)25-12-13-26-24-11-10-22-18-23(30)14-16-28(22,5)27(24)15-17-29(25,26)6/h8-9,11,19-23,25-27,30H,7,10,12-18H2,1-6H3/b9-8+/t20-,21-,22+,23+,25-,26+,27+,28+,29-/m1/s1 Key: JZVFJDZBLUFKCA-FXIAWGAOSA-N; InChI=1/C29H48O/c1-7-21(19(2)3)9-8-20(4)25-12-13-26-24-11-10-22-18-23(30)14-16-28(22,5)27(24)15-17-29(25,26)6/h8-9,11,19-23,25-27,30H,7,10,12-18H2,1-6H3/b9-8+/t20-,21-,22+,23+,25-,26+,27+,28+,29-/m1/s1 Key: JZVFJDZBLUFKCA-FXIAWGAOBQ
- SMILES: O[C@H]1CC[C@@]2([C@@H]3\C(=C/C[C@H]2C1)[C@@H]4CC[C@H]([C@@H](/C=C/[C@@H](CC)C(C)C)C)[C@]4(CC3)C)C

Properties
Chemical formula	C_{29}H_{48}O
Molar mass	412.702 g·mol^{−1}
Appearance	Crystalline solid
Melting point	168 to 169 °C (334 to 336 °F; 441 to 442 K)
- Except where otherwise noted, data are given for materials in their standard state (at 25 °C [77 °F], 100 kPa). Infobox references

α-Spinasterol is a stigmastane-type phytosterol found in a variety of plant sources such as spinach, from which it gets its name.

The chemical was recently found in Gordonia ceylanica, the first time that this chemical was found in the Gordonia species.

== See also ==
- Chondrillasterol 24R isomer
- Stigmasterol 5,22-dien isomer
