= Polyspora multinervis =

Conservation status
- Least Concern (IUCN 3.1)

Scientific classification
- Kingdom: Plantae
- Clade: Tracheophytes
- Clade: Angiosperms
- Clade: Eudicots
- Clade: Asterids
- Order: Ericales
- Family: Theaceae
- Genus: Polyspora
- Species: P. multinervis

Binomial name
- Polyspora multinervis (King) Orel, Peter G.Wilson, Curry & Luu

Synonyms
- Gordonia multinervis King 1896; Gordonia concentricicatrix Burkill 1917; Polyspora concentricicatrix (Burkill) Orel, Peter G.Wilson, Curry & Luu 2013

Species of tree

Polyspora multinervis is a species of plant in the family Theaceae. It is a tree found in Peninsular Malaysia and Singapore. It is threatened by habitat loss.
