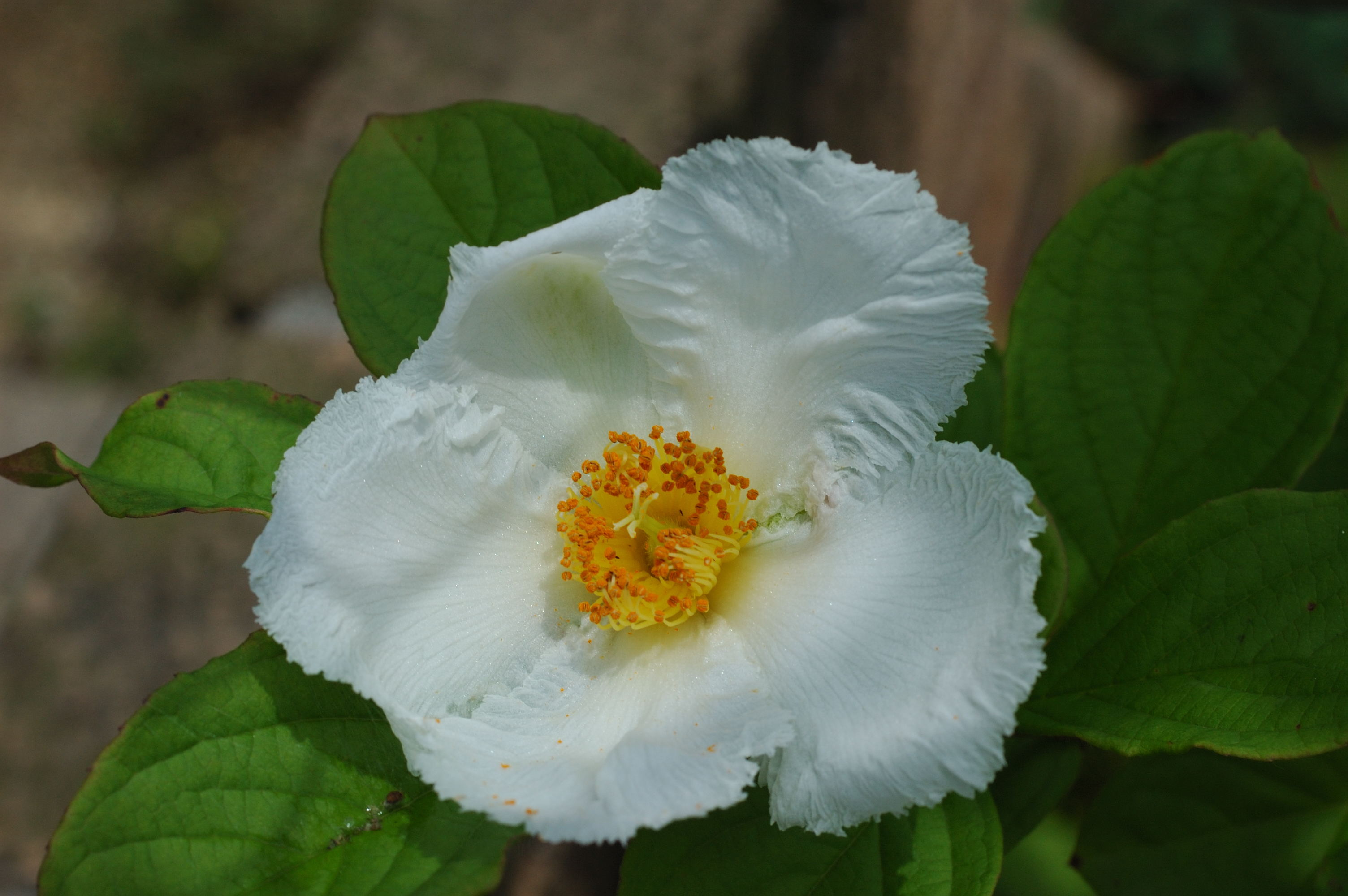
- Stewartia pseudocamellia

Scientific classification
- Kingdom: Plantae
- Clade: Embryophytes
- Clade: Tracheophytes
- Clade: Spermatophytes
- Clade: Angiosperms
- Clade: Eudicots
- Clade: Asterids
- Order: Ericales
- Family: Theaceae
- Genus: Stewartia; I.Lawson

Type species
- Stewartia malacodendron L.

Species
- See here

Synonyms
- Cavanilla Salisb.; Hartia Dunn; Malachodendron Mitch.

= Stewartia =

Genus of plants

Stewartia as described by Philibert Commerçon is a synonym of Dombeya.

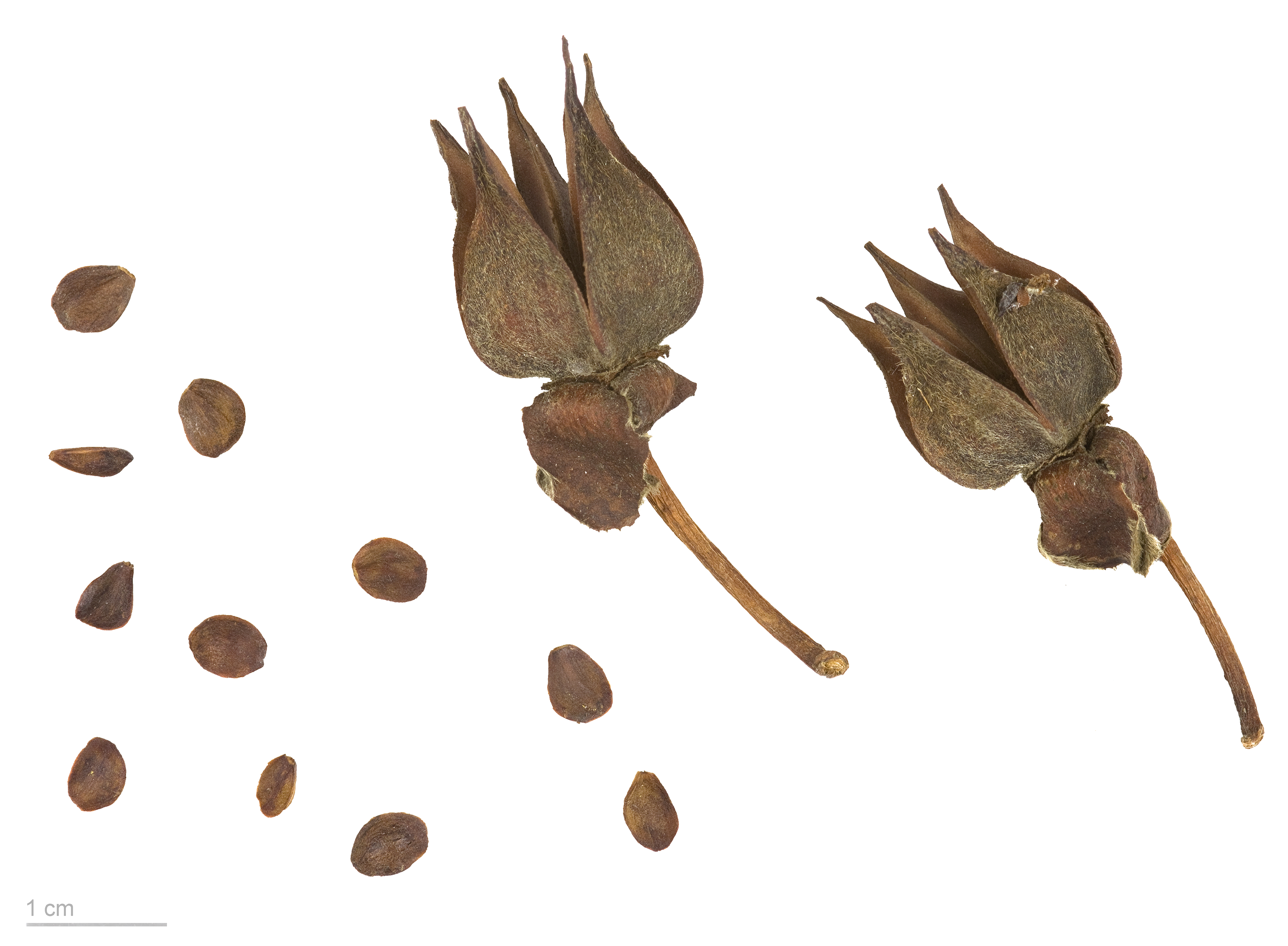
Stewartia koreana - MHNT

Stewartia (sometimes spelled Stuartia) is a genus of 8-20 species of flowering plants in the family Theaceae, related to Camellia. Most of the species are native to eastern Asia in China, Japan, Korea, Laos, Myanmar, Thailand, and Vietnam, with two (S. malacodendron, S. ovata) in southeast North America, from Virginia and Kentucky south to Florida and Louisiana.

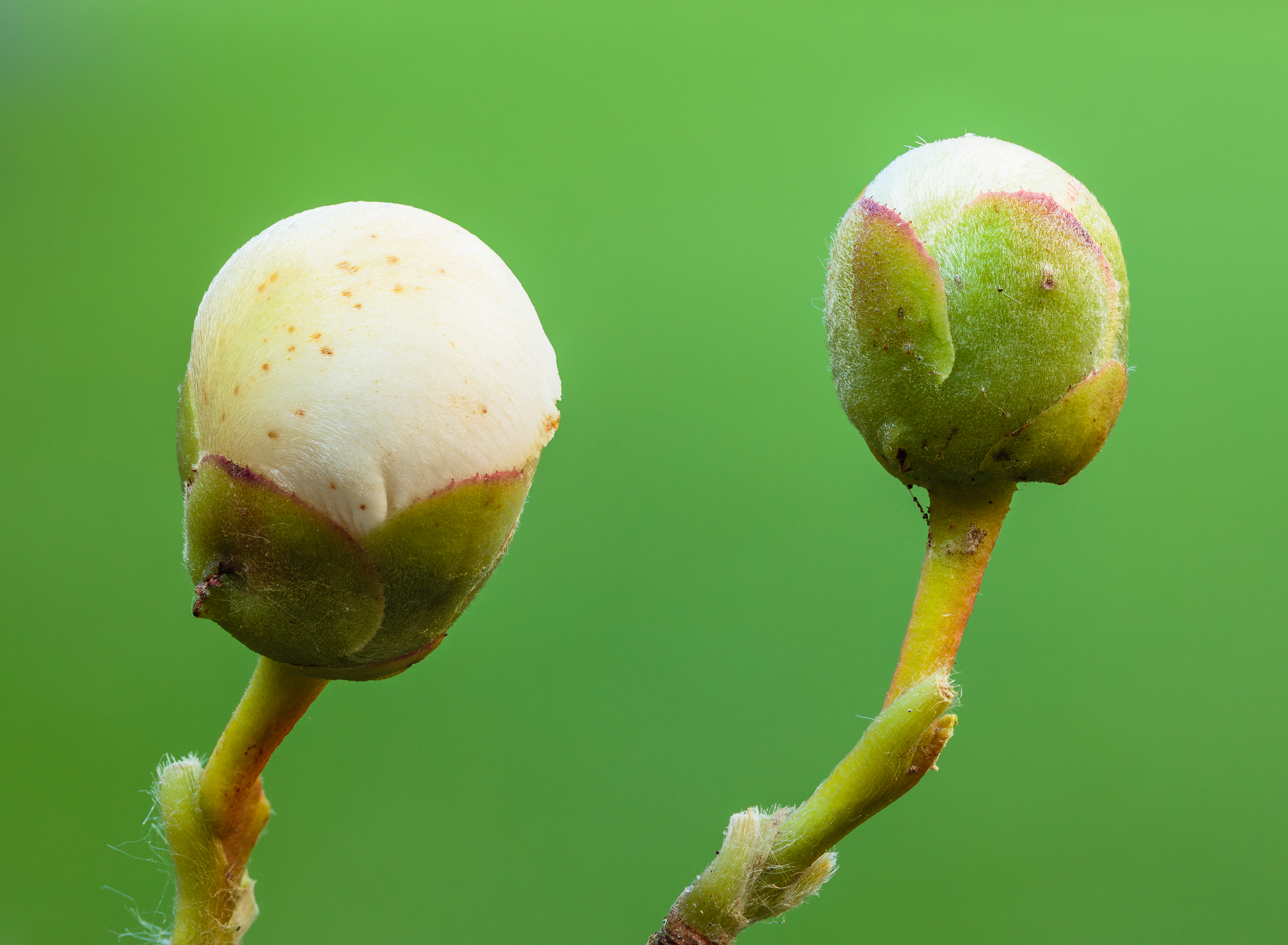
Flower buds

== Description ==
They are shrubs and trees, mostly deciduous, though some species (e.g. S. pteropetiolata) are evergreen; the evergreen species form a genetically distinct group and are split into a separate genus Hartia by some botanists, but others retain them within Stewartia. The Asian species include both shrubs and trees, growing to 3–20 m tall, while the American species are shrubs growing 3–5 m tall, rarely becoming small trees. The bark is very distinctive, smooth orange to yellow-brown, peeling in fine flakes. The leaves are alternately arranged, simple, serrated, usually glossy, and 3–14 cm long. The flowers are large and conspicuous, 3–11 cm diameter, with 5 (occasionally 6-8) white petals; flowering is in mid to late summer. The fruit is a dry five-valved capsule, with one to four seeds in each section.

== Taxonomy ==
The genus was described by Isaac Lawson in 1753 with Stewartia malacodendron L. as the type species. The genus was named to honour John Stuart, 3rd Earl of Bute. Owing to a transcription error, Linnaeus was given the name as 'Stewart', and consequently spelled the name "Stewartia" (and continued to do so in all his subsequent publications). Some botanists and horticulturists, mainly in the past but still widely in the UK have interpreted Article 60 of the International Code of Botanical Nomenclature to consider "Stewartia" an orthographical error to be corrected to Stuartia, but this type of correction has been discouraged by changes to the code in recent times.

During the 19th century, the spelling Stuartia was "almost universally" used. However, the original spelling "Stewartia" has been accepted by virtually all systematic botanists in recent treatments of the family and genus as well as in numerous influential horticultural publications.

=== Species ===
As of March 2025, the following species are accepted:

Image	Scientific name	Distribution
	Stewartia acutisepala P.L.Chiu & G.R.Zhong	China (Zhejiang)
	Stewartia calcicola T.L.Ming & J.Li	China (Yunnan, Guangxi), Vietnam
	Stewartia cordifolia (H.L.Li) J.Li & T.L.Ming	China (Guangxi, Guizhou, Hunan)
	Stewartia crassifolia (S.Z.Yan) J.Li & T.L.Ming	China (Guangdong, Guangxi, Hunan, Jiangxi)
	Stewartia densivillosa (Hu ex Hung T.Chang & C.X.Ye) J.Li & T.L.Ming	China (Yunnan)
	Stewartia laotica (Gagnep.) J.Li & T.L.Ming	China (Yunnan, Guangxi), Laos, Vietnam
	Stewartia malacodendron L.	United States (Alabama, Arkansas, Florida, Georgia, Louisiana, Mississippi, North Carolina, South Carolina, Texas, Virginia )
	Stewartia medogensis J.Li & T.L.Ming	China (Xizang)
	Stewartia micrantha (Chun) Sealy	China (Guangdong, Fujian)
	Stewartia monadelpha Siebold & Zucc.	Japan
	Stewartia obovata (Chun ex Hung T.Chang) J.Li & T.L.Ming	China (N. Guangxi, SW. Guangdong)
	Stewartia ovata (Cav.) Weath.	United States (Alabama, Georgia, Kentucky, Mississippi, North Carolina, South Carolina, Tennessee, Virginia)
	Stewartia pseudocamellia Maxim.	Japan, Korea
	Stewartia pteropetiolata W.C.Cheng	China (Yunnan)
	Stewartia rostrata Spongberg	China (Anhui, Henan, Hubei, Hunan, Jiangxi, Zhejiang)
	Stewartia rubiginosa Hung T.Chang	China (Guangdong, Hunan)
	Stewartia serrata Maxim.	Japan
	Stewartia sichuanensis (S.Z.Yan) J.Li & T.L.Ming	China (Sichuan)
	Stewartia sinensis Rehder & E.H.Wilson	China (Anhui, Fujian, Guangxi, Guizhou, Henan, Hubei, Hunan, Jiangxi, Shaanxi, Sichuan, Yunnan, Zhejiang.)
	Stewartia sinii (Y.C.Wu) Sealy	China (Guangxi)
	Stewartia tonkinensis (Merr.) C.Y.Wu ex J.Li	Vietnam
	Stewartia villosa Merr.	China (Guangdong, Guangxi, Jiangxi), Vietnam

== Cultivation ==
Several species of Stewartia are grown as ornamental plants for their very decorative smooth orange bark and their flowers produced at a time of year when few other trees are in flower. The species are adapted to acidic soils, and do not grow well on chalk or other calcium-rich soils. They also have a high rainfall requirement and will not tolerate drought.
