= Camellia ptilophylla =

Conservation status
- Vulnerable (IUCN 3.1)

Scientific classification
- Kingdom: Plantae
- Clade: Tracheophytes
- Clade: Angiosperms
- Clade: Eudicots
- Clade: Asterids
- Order: Ericales
- Family: Theaceae
- Genus: Camellia
- Species: C. ptilophylla

Binomial name
- Camellia ptilophylla H.T.Chang

Species of flowering plant

Camellia ptilophylla, also called the cocoa tea plant (not to be confused with the chocolate plant Theobroma cacao), is a species of Camellia plant found in Southern Asia. It has insignificant levels of naturally occurring caffeine, unlike other varieties of the plant used to make tea.

== History ==
For many years, it has been widely consumed by local inhabitants in the Longmen area of Guangdong Province of China but has only started attracting scientific interest since 1988. It was first scientifically documented in the 1980s.

== Preparation for tea ==
As with steeping most other teas, tea leaves are infused in just-boiled water for 3 min. The aroma profile of Cocoa tea is different from the traditional green tea, but the difference between oolong Cocoa tea and traditional oolong tea is not. For instance, fruity, white peach-like and floral, orchid-like and dry-fruit were stronger in the Cocoa tea infusion, while roasted, fresh tree-like and sweet, sugar-like were stronger in the traditional oolong tea, also known as Tie guan yin.

== Health Benefits ==
Studies have shown that green tea has positive health effects. However, the presence of caffeine in other varieties of tea plant has certain limitations. Therefore, this presents the idea that dietary cocoa tea might be of therapeutic value. For example, a study was conducted to see if it could provide a safer option for patients with diet-induced metabolic syndrome.
