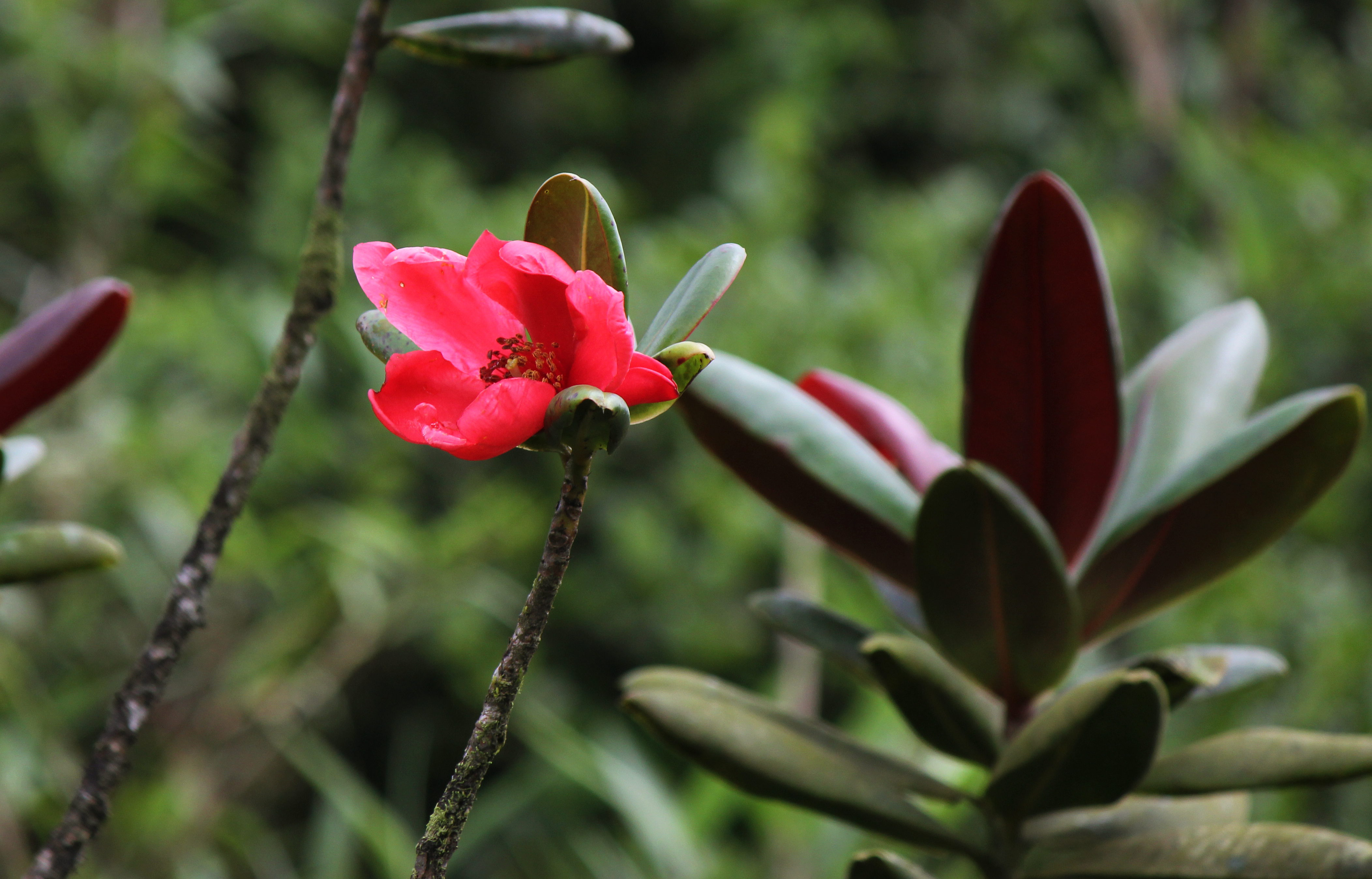

Conservation status
- Critically Endangered (IUCN 3.1)"Rathu Mihiriya". Global Trees. Archived from the original on June 30, 2022.

Scientific classification
- Kingdom: Plantae
- Clade: Tracheophytes
- Clade: Angiosperms
- Clade: Eudicots
- Clade: Asterids
- Order: Ericales
- Family: Theaceae
- Genus: Polyspora
- Species: P. gardneri

Binomial name
- Polyspora gardneri Orel, Peter G.Wilson, Curry & Luu

Synonyms
- Carria speciosa Gardner 1847; Gordonia speciosa (Gardner) Choisy 1855; Lasianthus speciosus (Gardner) Kuntze 1891; Nabiasodendron speciosum (Gardner) Pit. 1902

= Polyspora gardneri =

Species of flowering plant

Polyspora gardneri or previously known as Gordonia speciosa, is a species of plant in the family Theaceae. It is endemic to Sri Lanka. It is red in colour, which gives it the name 'rathu mihiriya', meaning 'red beauty' in Sinhala. It has oval shaped leaves. Polyspora gardneri is at high risk of extinction, as it is found in only one location, which contains fewer than 100 individual trees. This species was once more common in forests above Ramboda in Sri Lanka, but has undergone severe population declines. These species is only seen in mountains at altitudes exceeding 1,270 meters above sea level. It was discovered in 1847.
