= Polyspora scortechinii =

Conservation status
- Critically Endangered (IUCN 3.1)

Scientific classification
- Kingdom: Plantae
- Clade: Tracheophytes
- Clade: Angiosperms
- Clade: Eudicots
- Clade: Asterids
- Order: Ericales
- Family: Theaceae
- Genus: Polyspora
- Species: P. scortechinii

Binomial name
- Polyspora scortechinii (King) Orel, Peter G.Wilson, Curry & Luu (2013)

Synonyms
- Gordonia scortechinii King (1896)

Species of tree

Polyspora scortechinii is a species of plant in the family Theaceae. It is a tree endemic to Peninsular Malaysia. It is threatened by habitat loss.
