= Polyspora ceylanica =

Scientific classification
- Kingdom: Plantae
- Clade: Tracheophytes
- Clade: Angiosperms
- Clade: Eudicots
- Clade: Asterids
- Order: Ericales
- Family: Theaceae
- Genus: Polyspora
- Species: P. ceylanica

Binomial name
- Polyspora ceylanica (Wight) Orel, Peter G.Wilson, Curry & Luu

Synonyms
- Gordonia ceylanica Wight 1840; Lasianthus ceylanicus (Wight) Kuntze 1891; Nabiasodendron ceylanicum (Wight) Pit. 1902

Species of flowering plant

Polyspora ceylanica is a species of plant in the family Theaceae. It is endemic to Sri Lanka.

== Culture ==
It is known as "මිහිරිය - mihiriya" in Sinhala.

== Chemical constituents ==
The plant contains the oleanane-type triterpenoids 3beta-acetoxy-11alpha(2',3'-epoxyferulyloxy)-olean-13(18)-ene and α-spinasterol.
