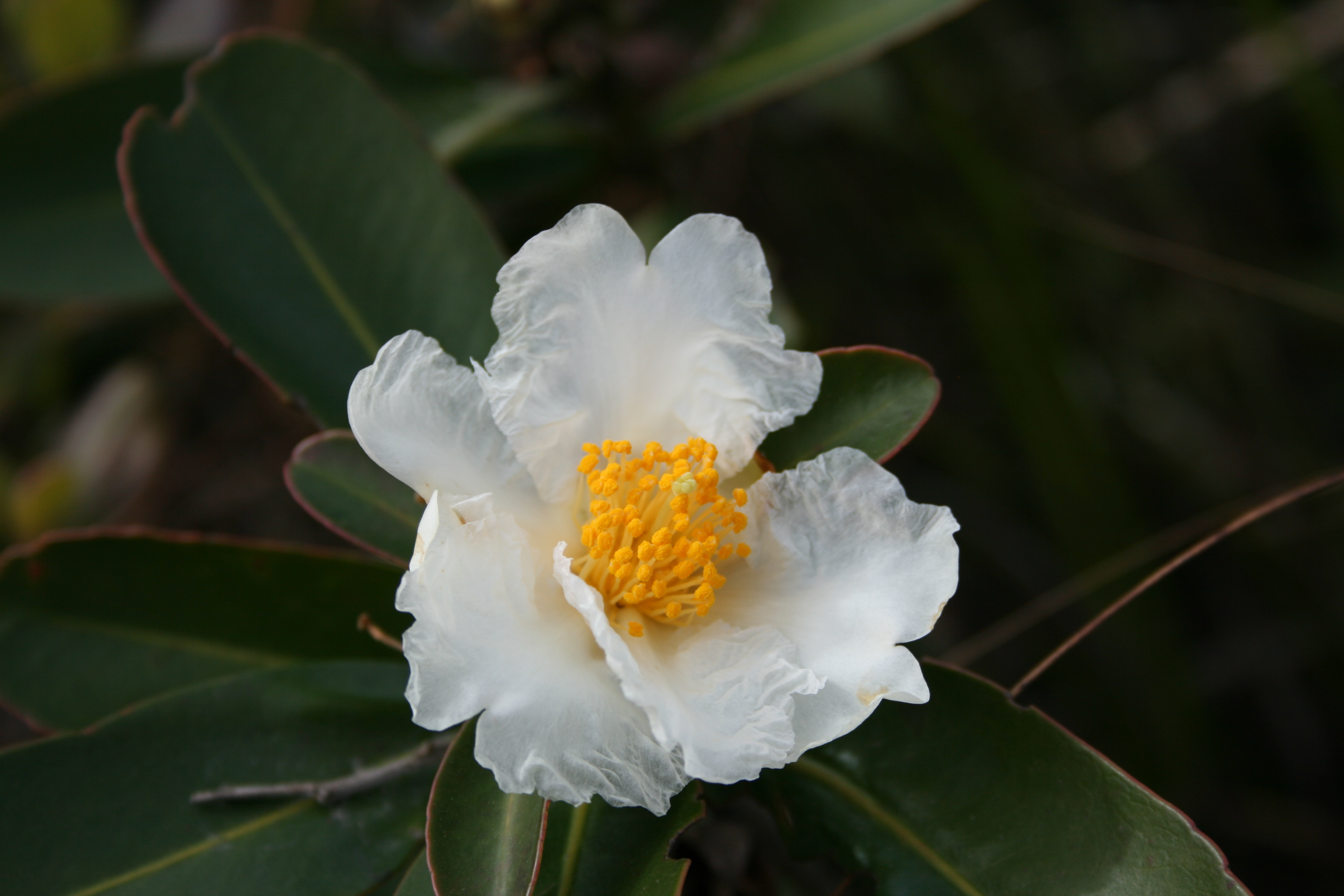
- Polyspora axillaris

Scientific classification
- Kingdom: Plantae
- Clade: Embryophytes
- Clade: Tracheophytes
- Clade: Spermatophytes
- Clade: Angiosperms
- Clade: Eudicots
- Clade: Asterids
- Order: Ericales
- Family: Theaceae
- Genus: Polyspora; Sweet

Species
- See here

Synonyms
- Dipterospermum Griff.; Antheischima Korth.; Carria Gardner; Closaschima Korth.; Nabiasodendron Pit.

= Polyspora =

Genus of plants

Polyspora is a genus of flowering plants in the tea family (Theaceae). It includes 47 species, which range from India through Indochina, southern China, Malesia, Taiwan and New Guinea.

The genus is highly valued for its ornamental qualities. Particularly, these species flowers during the winter, and enhance garden landscapes visually with their attractive foliage, fruits, bark, and overall form. They are generally fast-growing and adaptable, with leaves that have high water content, and capable of thriving in poor, mountainous soils, making them suitable for afforestation in tropical and subtropical regions. In addition, some species contain natural antioxidant compounds with potential health-related applications.

== Species ==
47 species are currently accepted:

- Polyspora amboinensis (Miq.) Orel, Peter G.Wilson, Curry & Luu
- Polyspora ampla Orel, Curry & Luu
- Polyspora axillaris (Roxb. ex Ker Gawl.) Sweet
- Polyspora balansae (Pit.) Hu
- Polyspora bidoupensis (Gagnep.) Orel, Peter G.Wilson, Curry & Luu
- Polyspora borneensis (H.Keng) Orel, Peter G.Wilson, Curry & Luu
- Polyspora ceylanica (Wight) Orel, Peter G.Wilson, Curry & Luu
- Polyspora chrysandra (Cowan) Hu ex B.M.Barthol. & T.L.Ming
- Polyspora cuongii V.D.Luong & V.T.Pham
- Polyspora dalglieshiana (Craib) Orel, Peter G.Wilson, Curry & Luu
- Polyspora dassanayakei (Wadhwa & Weeras.) Orel, Peter G.Wilson, Curry & Luu
- Polyspora dipterosperma (Kurz) Orel, Peter G.Wilson, Curry & Luu
- Polyspora elliptica (Gardner) Orel, Peter G.Wilson, Curry & Luu
- Polyspora excelsa (Blume) Orel, Peter G.Wilson, Curry & Luu
- Polyspora gardneri Orel, Peter G.Wilson, Curry & Luu
- Polyspora gigantiflora (Gagnep.) Orel, Peter G.Wilson, Curry & Luu
- Polyspora gioii Luu, Tich & H.Tran
- Polyspora grandiflora (Merr.) Orel, Peter G.Wilson, Curry & Luu
- Polyspora hainanensis (Hung T.Chang) C.X.Ye ex S.X.Yang
- Polyspora havilandii (Burkill) Orel, Peter G.Wilson, Curry & Luu
- Polyspora hirtella (Ridl.) Orel, Peter G.Wilson, Curry & Luu
- Polyspora huongiana Orel, Curry & Luu
- Polyspora imbricata (King) Orel, Peter G.Wilson, Curry & Luu
- Polyspora integerrima (Miq.) Orel, Peter G.Wilson, Curry & Luu
- Polyspora intricata (Gagnep.) Orel, Peter G.Wilson, Curry & Luu
- Polyspora lanceifolia (Burkill) Orel, Peter G.Wilson, Curry & Luu
- Polyspora longicarpa (Hung T.Chang) C.X.Ye ex B.M.Barthol. & T.L.Ming
- Polyspora luzonica (S.Vidal) Orel, Peter G.Wilson, Curry & Luu
- Polyspora maingayi (Dyer) Orel, Peter G.Wilson, Curry & Luu
- Polyspora marginata (Korth.) Orel, Peter G.Wilson, Curry & Luu
- Polyspora microphylla V.D.Luong, T.L.Nguyen & Q.C.Truong
- Polyspora multinervis (King) Orel, Peter G.Wilson, Curry & Luu
- Polyspora nivea Orel, Curry & Luu
- Polyspora oblongifolia (Miq.) Orel, Peter G.Wilson, Curry & Luu
- Polyspora obtusa (Wall. ex Wight & Arn.) Niissalo & L.M.Choo
- Polyspora ovalis (Korth.) Niissalo & L.M.Choo
- Polyspora papuana (Kobuski) Orel, Peter G.Wilson, Curry & Luu
- Polyspora penangensis (Ridl.) Niissalo & L.M.Choo
- Polyspora polisana (Burkill) Orel, Peter G.Wilson, Curry & Luu
- Polyspora sablayana (Melch.) Orel, Peter G.Wilson, Curry & Luu
- Polyspora sarawakensis (H.Keng) Orel, Peter G.Wilson, Curry & Luu
- Polyspora scortechinii (King) Orel, Peter G.Wilson, Curry & Luu
- Polyspora singaporeana (Wall. ex Ridl.) Niissalo & L.M.Choo
- Polyspora speciosa (Kochs) B.M.Barthol. & T.L.Ming
- Polyspora spectabilis (W.Hunter) Orel, Peter G.Wilson, Curry & Luu
- Polyspora taipingensis (Burkill) Orel, Peter G.Wilson, Curry & Luu
- Polyspora vulcanica (Korth.) Orel, Peter G.Wilson, Curry & Luu ex I.M.Turner
