= Isaac Lawson =

Scottish physician and mineralogist

Isaac Lawson (died 1747), was a Scottish physician. He became a student of Leiden University on 17 May 1730. There he studied medicine and botany under Herman Boerhaave and Adriaan van Royen, and became the intimate friend of Linnaeus, whom he several times assisted with gifts of money. In conjunction with Jan Frederik Gronovius he helped fund the printing of Linnaeus' Systema Naturæ in 1735. Lawson obtained his doctorate in medicine on 28 December 1737 in Leiden with a thesis on zinc oxide, his thesis being entitled Dissertatio Academica sistens Nihil.

From spring to autumn 1738 he undertook an extensive trip to some of the Holy Roman Empire's most famous mines, during which he collected extensive mineral samples for his private collection. Via Hanover he first arrived in Goslar. From there he went on excursions to Zellerfeld and Clausthal. Three weeks later he traveled on to Sankt Andreasberg, sending samples of his collected minerals to Hieronymus David Gaubius, Johann Andreas Cramer and Gronovius. His further travels led him via Berlin and Halle to Leipzig, where he met Johann Ernst Hebenstreit and Christian Gottlieb Ludwig. In Freiberg he supposedly met with Johann Friedrich Henckel every day. When he arrived in Karlsbad, he realized that his plans to travel to Prague, Vienna and Hungary were no longer realistic, and thus decided to return to England via Flanders and Holland.

He later became a physician for the British army and took part in the War of the Austrian Succession. His death was possibly caused by wounds he sustained at the Battle of Lauffeldt on 2 July 1747. He died at Oosterhout in the Netherlands later that year.

== Legacy ==
Linnaeus dedicated to him the genus Lawsonia, the henna of the East. Lawson is mentioned in Dr. Maton's edition of Linnaeus's Diary, and included in his reprint of Richard Pulteney's View of the Writings of Linnaeus.

Another Isaac Lawson, possibly a son, entered Leyden University 13 March 1747, and is described in the register as Britanno-Edinburgensis.
