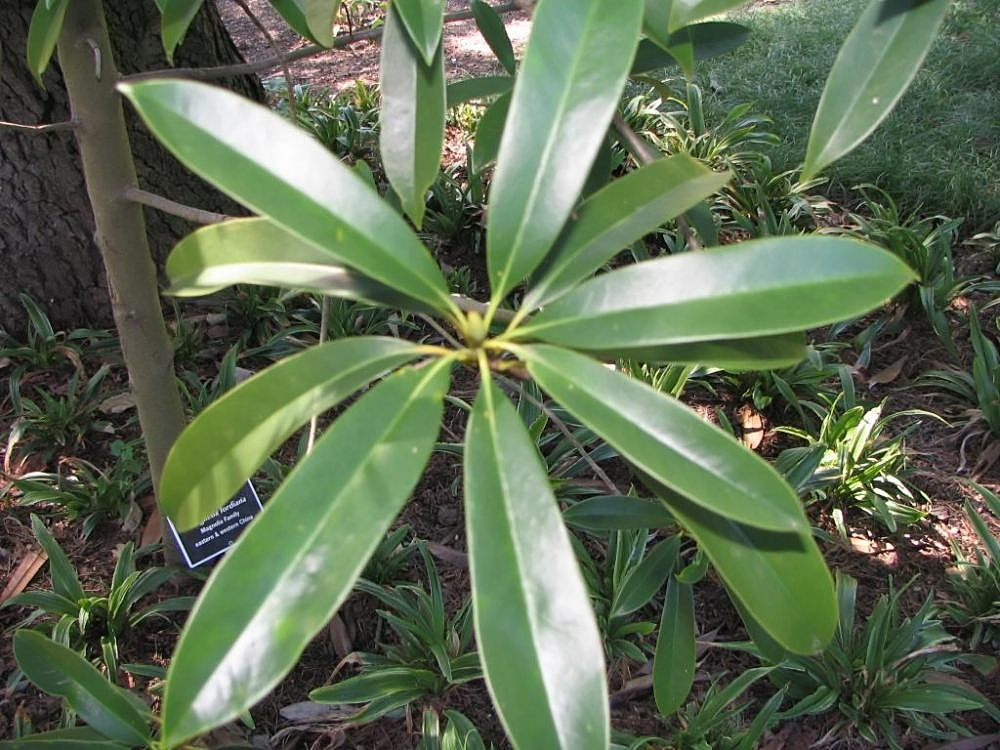
- At the United States National Arboretum

Conservation status
- Least Concern (IUCN 3.1)

Scientific classification
- Kingdom: Plantae
- Clade: Embryophytes
- Clade: Tracheophytes
- Clade: Spermatophytes
- Clade: Angiosperms
- Clade: Magnoliids
- Order: Magnoliales
- Family: Magnoliaceae
- Genus: Magnolia
- Species: M. fordiana

Binomial name
- Magnolia fordiana (Oliv.) Hu

Synonyms
- List: Magnolia albistaminea (Y.W.Law, R.Z.Zhou & X.S.Qin) C.B.Callaghan & Png; Magnolia guangnanica (D.X.Li & R.Z.Zhou ex X.M.Hu, Q.W.Zeng & L.Fu) C.B.Callaghan & Png; Magnolia inodora DC.; Manglietia albistaminea Y.W.Law, R.Z.Zhou & X.S.Qin; Manglietia aromatica var. calcarea (X.H.Song) Sima & S.G.Lu; Manglietia calcarea X.H.Song; Manglietia fordiana Oliv.; Manglietia fordiana var. calcarea (X.H.Song) B.L.Chen & Noot.; Manglietia fordiana var. forrestii (W.W.Sm. ex Dandy) B.L.Chen & Noot.; Manglietia fordiana var. hainanensis (Dandy) N.H.Xia; Manglietia forrestii W.W.Sm. ex Dandy; Manglietia globosa H.T.Chang; Manglietia guangnanica D.X.Li & R.Z.Zhou ex X.M.Hu, Q.W.Zeng & L.Fu; Manglietia hainanensis Dandy; Paramanglietia microcarpa H.T.Chang

= Magnolia fordiana =

Species of plant

Magnolia fordiana is a widespread species of flowering plant in the family Magnoliaceae, native to southern China, Hainan, and Vietnam. An evergreen tree reaching 25 m (82 ft) tall, it is found in hilly forests, often beside rivers, at elevations from 300 to 1,200 m (1,000 to 3,900 ft). Specialists in Magnolia believe that most Magnolia fordiana specimens offered for sale are actually the closely related Magnolia yuyuanensis, a more attractive tree and one that is better adapted to cultivation. It is widely used as a street tree in southern Chinese cities.

== Subtaxa ==
The following varieties are accepted:

- Magnolia fordiana var. calcarea (X.H.Song) V.S.Kumar – Yunnan, Guizhou
- Magnolia fordiana var. fordiana – southern China, Vietnam
- Magnolia fordiana var. forrestii (W.W.Sm. ex Dandy) V.S.Kumar – Guangxi, Yunnan
- Magnolia fordiana var. hainanensis (Dandy) Noot. – Hainan
