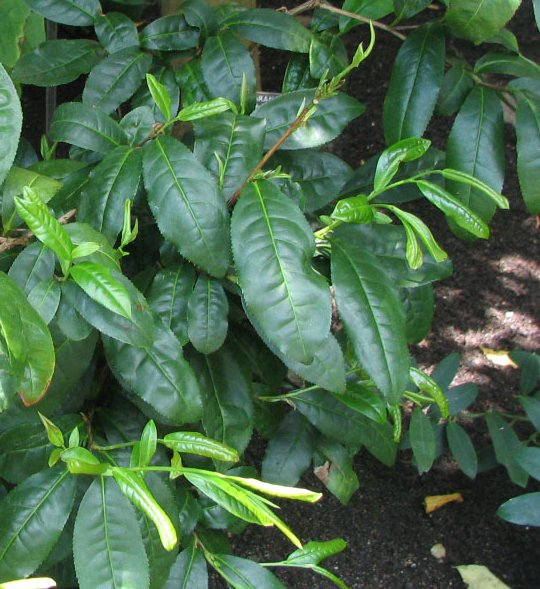
- Tea Camellia sinensis

Scientific classification
- Kingdom: Plantae
- Clade: Tracheophytes
- Clade: Angiosperms
- Clade: Eudicots
- Clade: Asterids
- Order: Ericales
- Family: Theaceae; Mirb. (1816)

Genera
- See text

Synonyms
- Camelliaceae

= Theaceae =

Family of flowering plants

Theaceae (/θiˈeɪsii/), the tea family, is a family of flowering plants comprising shrubs and trees, including the economically important tea plant, and the ornamental camellias. It can be described as having from seven to 40 genera, depending on the source and the method of circumscription used. The family Ternstroemiaceae has been included within Theaceae; however, the APG III system of 2009 places it instead in Pentaphylacaceae. Most but not all species are native to China and East Asia.

== Family traits ==
Plants in this family are characterized by simple leaves that are alternate spiral to distichous, serrated, and usually glossy. Most of the genera have evergreen foliage, but Stewartia and Franklinia are deciduous. The toothed margins are generally associated with a characteristic Theoid leaf tooth, which is crowned by a glandular, deciduous tip. The flowers in this family are usually pink or white and large and showy, often with a strong scent. The calyx consists of five or more sepals, which are often persistent in the fruiting stage, and the corolla is five-merous, rarely numerous. Plants in Theaceae are multistaminate, usually with 20-100+ stamens either free or adnate to the base of the corolla, and are also distinctive because of the presence of pseudopollen. The pseudopollen is produced from connective cells, and has either rib-like or circular thickenings. The ovary is often hairy and narrows gradually into the style, which may be branched or cleft. The carpels are typically opposite from the petals, or the sepals in the case of Camellia. The fruits are loculicidal capsules, indehiscent baccate fruits or sometimes pome-like. The seeds are few and sometimes winged, or in some genera covered by fleshy tissue or unwinged and nude.

== Genera ==
Eight genera are currently accepted:

- Apterosperma Hung T. Chang
- Camellia L., including Dankia Gagnep., Piquetia (Pierre) H.Hallier, Thea L., Yunnanea Hu
- Franklinia Marshall
- Gordonia Ellis, including Laplacea
- Polyspora Sweet
- Pyrenaria Blume, including Dubardella H.J.Lam, Glyptocarpa Hu, Parapyrenaria H.T.Chang, Sinopyrenaria Hu, Tutcheria Dunn
- Schima Blume
- Stewartia L., including Hartia Dunn

The fossil Pentapetalum trifasciculandricus, about 91 million years old, may belong to the Theaceae or the Pentaphylacaceae.

== Distribution ==
Members of the family are found in Southeast Asia and Malesia, tropical South America and the Southeast United States. Three genera (Franklinia, Gordonia and Stewartia) have species native to the Southeast United States, with Franklinia being endemic there, and under some interpretations, also Gordonia with the Asian species formerly included in that genus being transferred to Polyspora.

== Biochemistry ==
There is distinctive chemistry within the family Theaceae. Sometimes, single crystals of calcium oxalate are present in Theaceous plants. Ellagic acid and common polyphenols including flavonols, flavones and proanthocyanins are widely distributed throughout the family. Gallic acid and catechins only occur in Camellia sect. Thea (C. sinensis, C. taliensis and C. irrawadiensis.) Caffeine and its precursors theobromine and theophylline are only found in sect. Thea and are not found in other species of Camellia or other Theaceae. Caffeine content in the tea bush makes up 2.5-4% of the leaf's dry weight, and this high content of catechins and caffeine in the tea bush is the result of artificial selection by humans for these characters. Triterpenes and their glycosides (saponins) are found widely throughout the family in the seeds, leaves, wood and bark. Plants in this family are also known to accumulate aluminum and fluoride.

== Economic importance ==
The best known genus is Camellia, which includes the plant whose leaves are used to produce tea (Camellia sinensis). In parts of Asia, other species are used as a beverage, including C. taliensis, C. grandibractiata, C. kwangsiensis, C. gymnogyna, C. crassicolumna, C. tachangensis, C. ptilophylla, and C. irrawadiensis. Several species are grown widely as ornamentals for their flowers and handsome foliage.
