= Hong Kong Foundation Day =

Anniversary of the founding of Hong Kong

Foundation Day
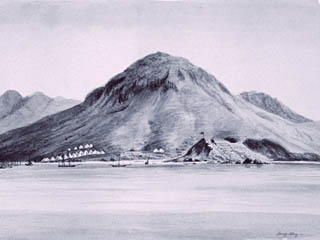
- Picture showing the early period of Possession Mount with a flying flag on it
- Also called: Hong Kong Founding Day, Hong Kong Day, Festival of Hong Kong, Hong Kong's birthday
- Observed by: Hong Kong
- Type: Unofficial
- Significance: Beginning of British rule in 1841 until 1997
- Observances: History talks and exhibitions
- Date: 26 January
- Next time: 26 January 2027
- Frequency: Annual
- Related to: Norfolk Island Foundation Day, Western Australia Day, Founding of modern Singapore

Hong Kong Foundation Day
- Chinese: 香港開埠日
Transcriptions
Yue: Cantonese
- Yale Romanization: hēung góng hōi fauh yaht
- Jyutping: hoeng^{1} gong^{2} hoi^{1} fau^{6} jat^{6}

Hong Kong Foundation Day (Chinese: 香港開埠日), also known as Hong Kong Day (香港日) and Festival of Hong Kong (香港節), is the anniversary of the founding of Hong Kong as a free port when Britain formally colonised it on 26 January 1841 (Note: Regnal Year: / Year; Victoria / Fourth; Daoguang / Twenty-First; Corresponding Date of Lunar Calendar on 26 Jan 1841 of Gregorian Calendar: / Heavenly Stem / Earthly Branch / Zodiac / Month / Day; Chinese / 辛 / 丑 / 牛 / 正月 / 初四; English / Xin / Chou / Ox / First / Fourth) after entering into a provisional treaty, known as the Chuenpi Convention, with an official of the Qing government. The British Colonial Government did not make it an official public holiday, nor does the SAR Government. Yet, some members of the public do organise various history talks or exhibitions on or near 26 January each year.

In Cantonese, this day is called 開埠日 (Yale: hōi fauh yaht), which means "Port Opening Day", reflecting the original intention of the British acquisition of Hong Kong was for opening it up and turning it into a port of free trade. The name also signifies that international commerce became legally permitted in Hong Kong upon British administration whereas Hong Kong had not been allowed to conduct foreign trade under the Canton System policy of the Qing government.

== Background ==
In January 1841, after a series of negotiations, a provisional treaty seeking to end the First Opium War between Britain and the Qing Dynasty, known as the Convention of Chuenpi, was struck by representatives from the two sides, namely, Plenipotentiary Charles Elliot and Imperial Commissioner Qishan. With the instruction given to him to take possession of some islands for trade in the previous year, Elliot demanded and secured the cession of Hong Kong Island as one of the terms of the Convention even though Zhoushan Island had been preferred by his boss Lord Palmerston. While in Macau, Elliot announced the details of the Convention by publishing a circular on the 20th.

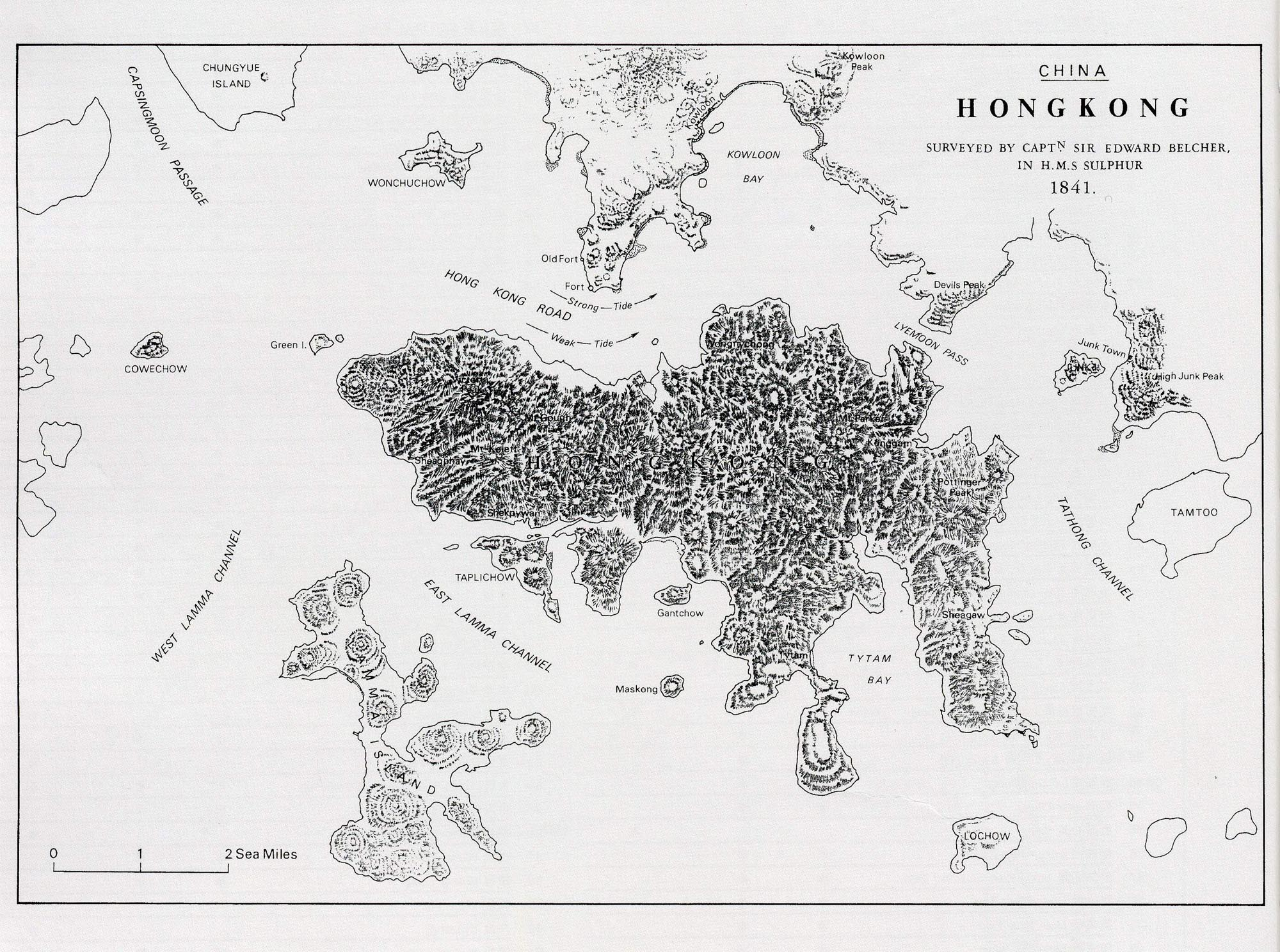
Belcher drew this map after he surveyed Hong Kong Island.

Four days after the announcement, Captain Edward Belcher, aboard HMS Sulphur, surveyed Hong Kong Island and landed the next morning on the 25th at 8:15 o'clock, but he did not proceed to take formal possession of it. Yet, he did claim themselves being the bona fide first possessors, and they drank to the Queen's health with three cheers.

In addition, some merchants rushed from Macau to Hong Kong Island for the upcoming ceremony after learning the news in Macau.

In the end, a formal possession ceremony was held on 26 January by Commodore Gordon Bremer at Possession Point. He was accompanied by other officers of the squadron. The Royal Marines fired a feu de joie, and the war ships performed a Royal Salute. The Union Jack was hoisted before the crowd, symbolising the beginning of British rule.

== Activities ==
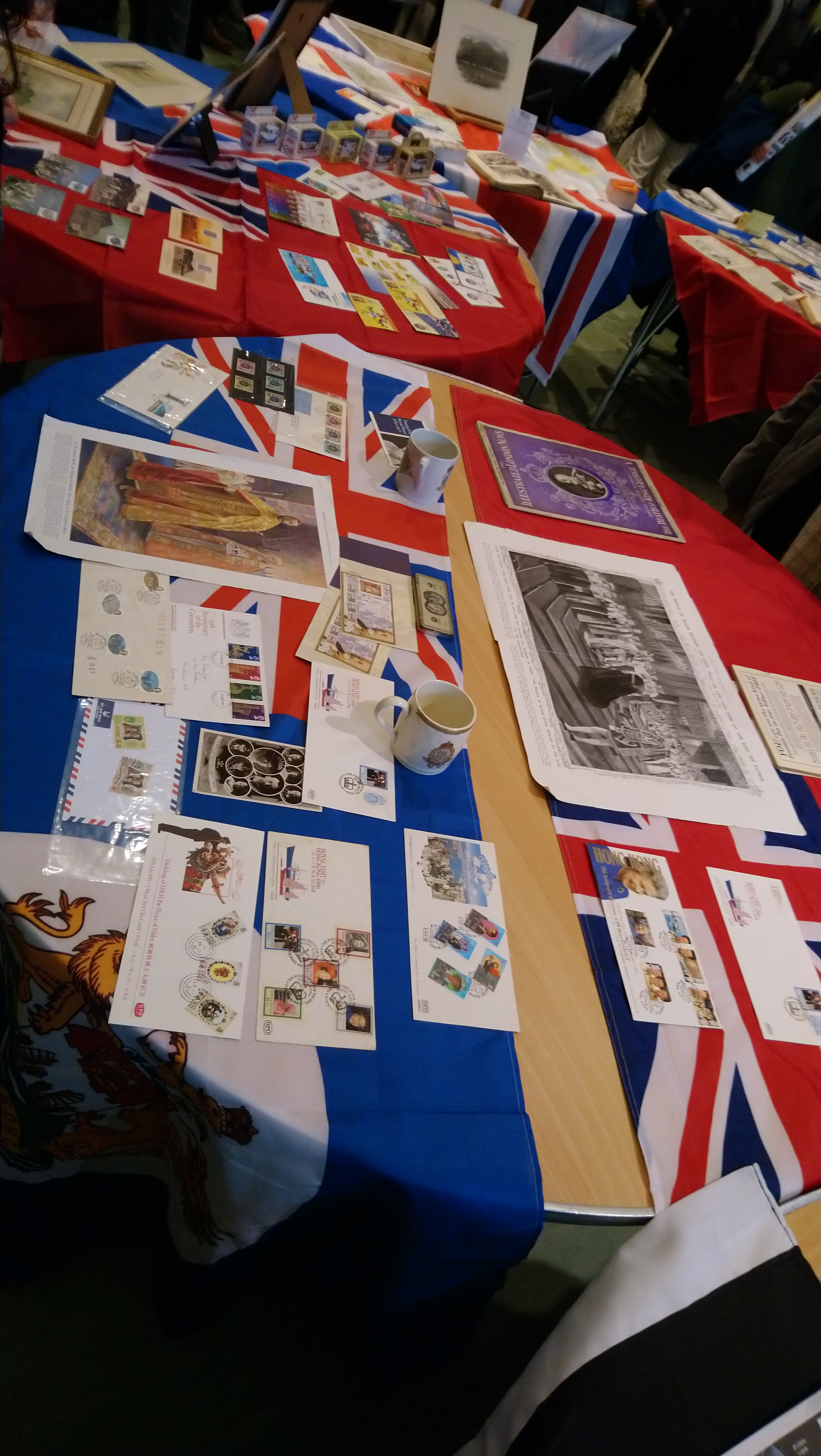
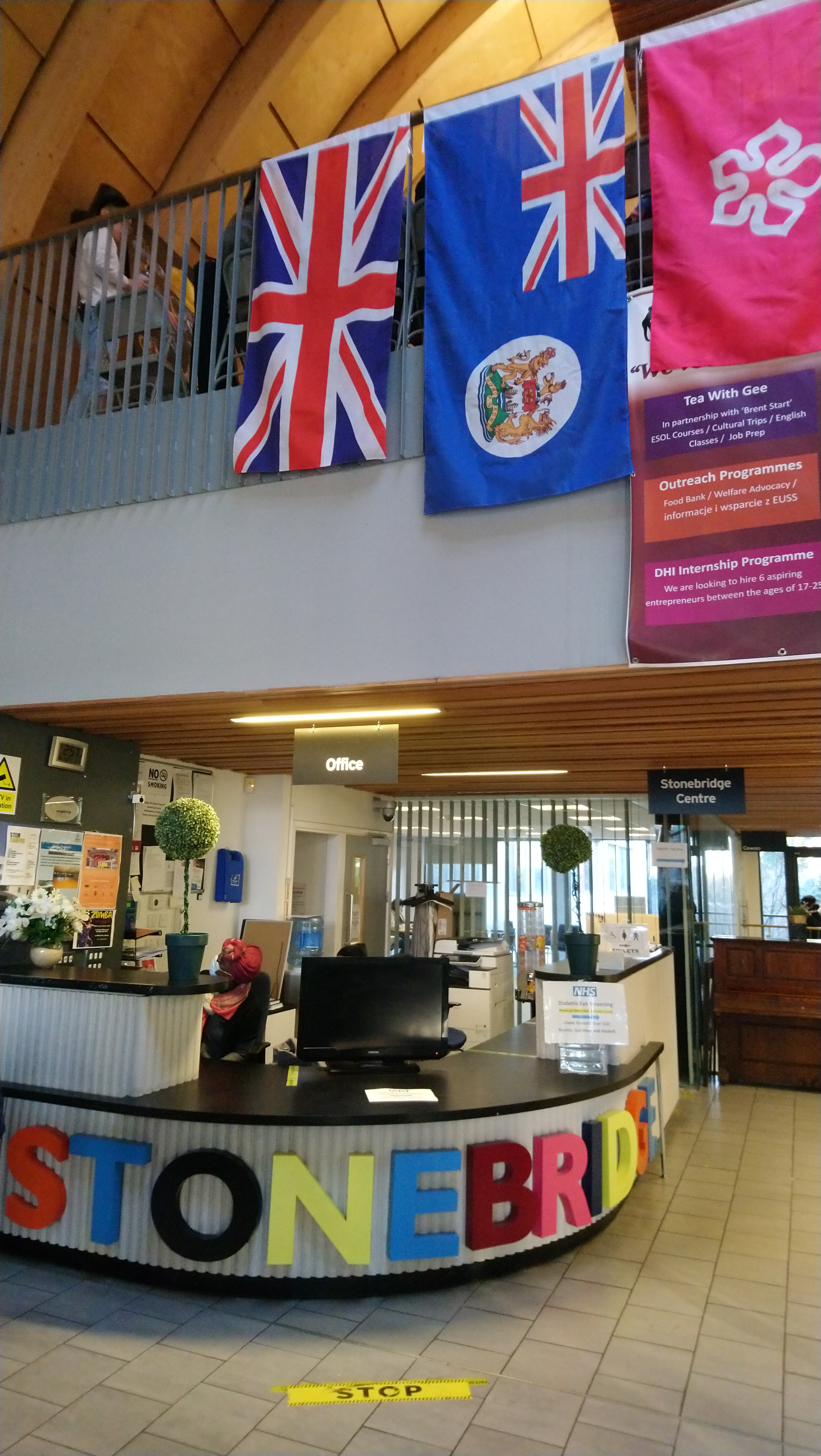
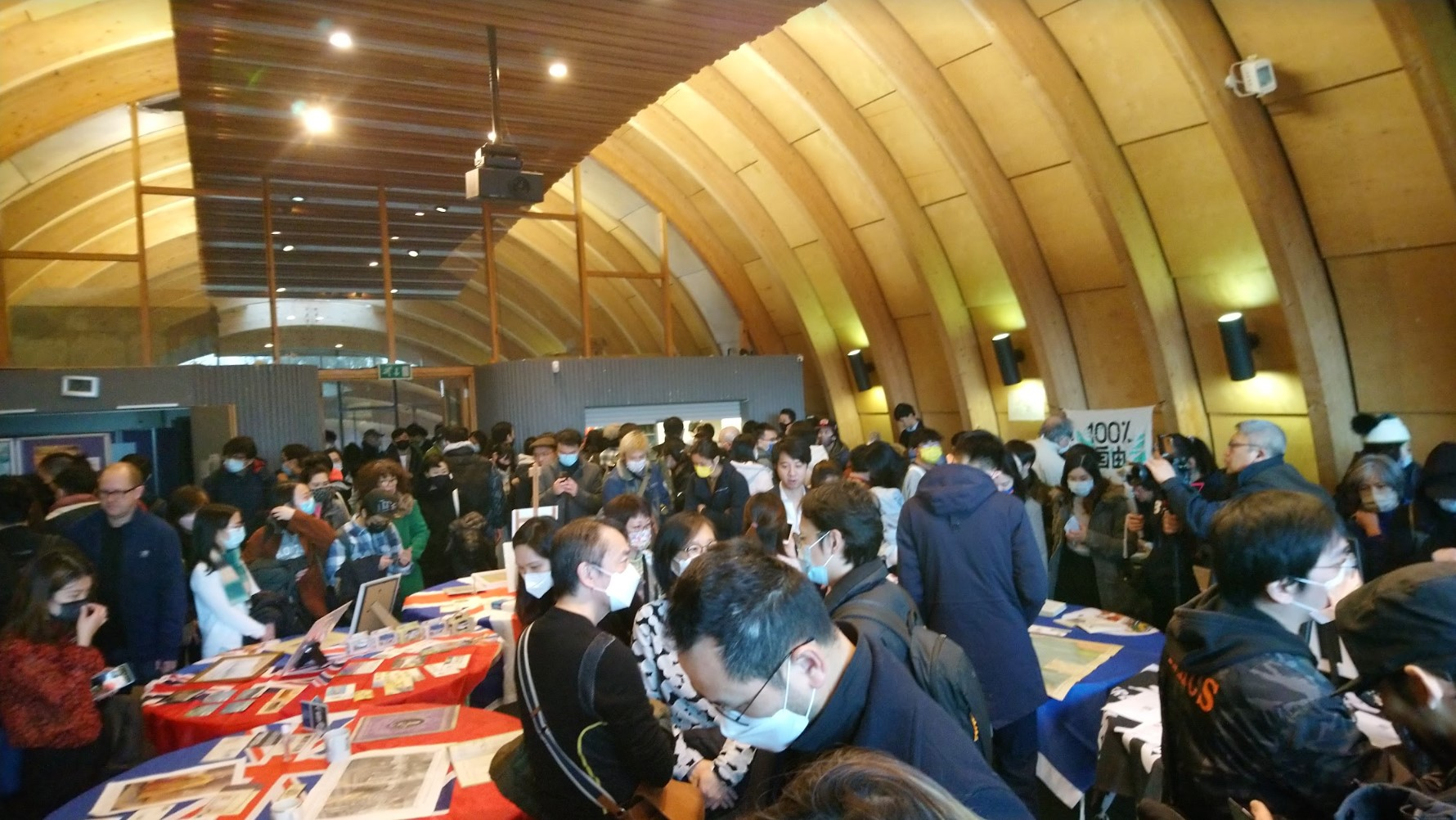
Foundation Day event in Stonebridge, London

Today, news media often have history quizzes ready for their audiences on Foundation Day, and non-governmental organisations arrange history talks and exhibitions for the general public to participate.

But celebrations are not limited to Hong Kong. Events have been held in overseas metropolises with significant numbers of diaspora Hong Kongers, such as London and Melbourne. Hong Kong street food stalls, mini-concerts featuring Hong Kong music, and other cultural activities can also be found in these overseas events in addition to history-focused exhibitions and talks.

Human rights groups and pro-democracy activists may also take the opportunity on Foundation Day to raise awareness of various issues about Hong Kong.

=== 50th Anniversary (Golden Jubilee) ===
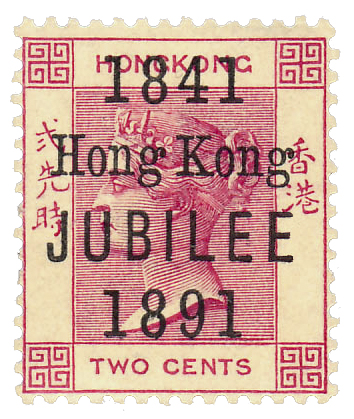
1891 Jubilee overprint stamp

The Hong Kong Post Office released the very first commemorative stamp in Hong Kong's history to celebrate the golden jubilee of the foundation of Hong Kong. Because the government did not have enough time to have a specially designed commemorative stamp ready for the occasion, they instead decided to overprint the existing two-cent definitive stamp with the phrase "1841 Hong Kong JUBILEE 1891". The commemorative overprint became an instant hit. With long queues and only a total of 50,000 prints, collectors got desperate and violent. Many got injured in the ensuing chaos as they tried to get hold of these stamps. In the end, three people died, with a Dutch sailor getting stabbed and two Portuguese customers getting crushed to death.

In addition to the issuance of the golden jubilee stamp, there was a whole range of other celebrations across Hong Kong. Warships in Victoria Harbour fired a royal salute. A troop review was conducted at Happy Valley. The Anglican and Catholic cathedrals conducted special services. Hong Kong City Hall held a public ball. A concert was performed at the Club Germania. Sport games, including cricket and shooting contests, were arranged. Ship owners strung decorative lights on their boats.

=== 100th Anniversary (Centenary) ===
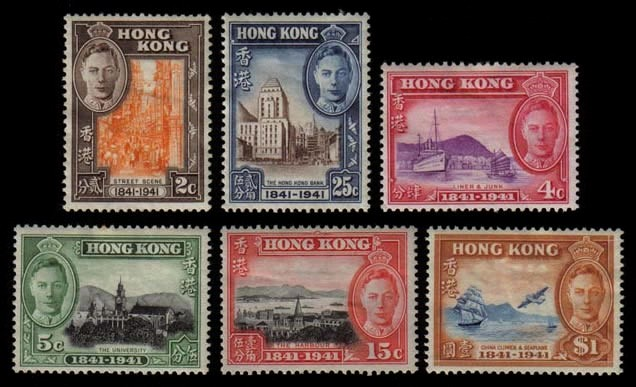
Centenary stamps

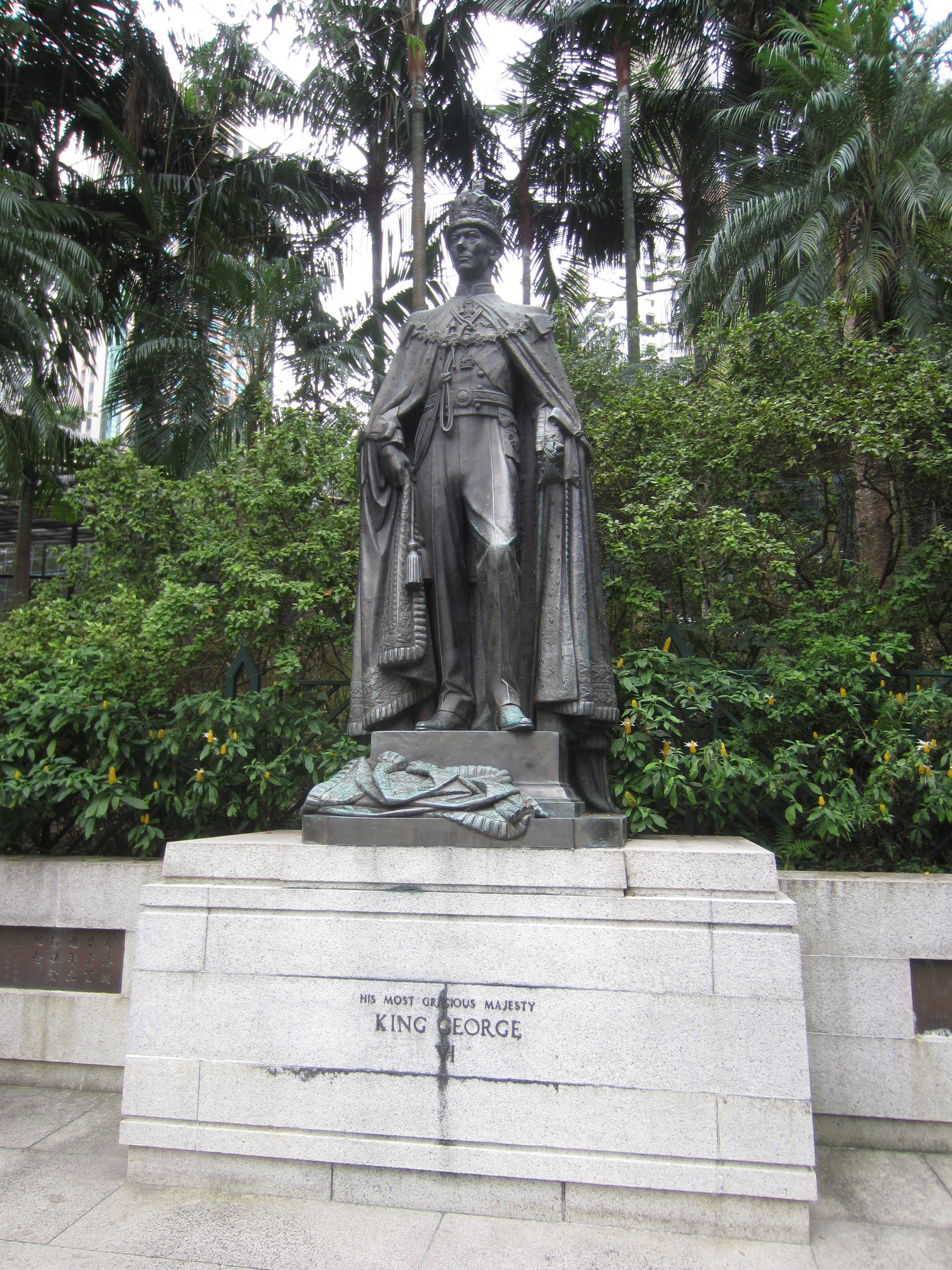
Statue of King George VI

1941 saw the centenary of Hong Kong's founding, but celebrations were not as extensive and vibrant as for the Golden Jubilee in 1891 when Europe had already been engulfed in WWII and the prospect of Japan invading Hong Kong was looming on the horizon.

To mark the occasion, the Hong Kong Post Office issued a set of six commemorative stamps. This set of stamps features various local sights and scenes to showcase the developments of Hong Kong as a British colony over the previous 100 years. The stamps were originally intended to be released in October 1940 but ultimately got published on 26 February 1941, exactly one month after the anniversary.

The renowned British sculptor Gilbert Ledward created a bronze statue of King George VI to commemorate the centenary of Hong Kong's foundation. The statue is located in the Hong Kong Zoological and Botanical Gardens.

The Legislative Council also unanimously passed a resolution, titled Loyalty to the Throne, to celebrate the centenary of the foundation of Hong Kong. In particular, Sir Man-kam Lo, a Eurasian lawyer, offered support for the resolution on behalf of all other ethnically Chinese members of the Council.

=== 180th Anniversary ===
The year 2021 was the 180th anniversary of Foundation Day. A group of British parliamentarians from the House of Commons, led by Andrew Rosindell MP, tabled the non-binding Early Day Motion 1382 for the occasion in which, among other things, they welcomed those Hong Kongers who were moving to the UK from Hong Kong "to escape the iron heel of Chinese Communist tyranny".

Signatories of Early Day Motion 1382
Parliamentarian	Political Party	Sponsorship	Date Signed
Andrew Rosindell	Conservative	Sponsor (Primary)	20 January 2021
Layla Moran	Liberal Democrat	Sponsor	21 January 2021
Sir Mike Penning	Conservative	Sponsor	21 January 2021
Paul Girvan	Democratic Unionist	Sponsor	21 January 2021
Sir David Amess	Conservative	Sponsor	21 January 2021
Caroline Lucas	Green	Sponsor	25 January 2021
Sammy Wilson	Democratic Unionist	Non-Sponsor	26 January 2021
Craig Whittaker	Conservative	Non-Sponsor	12 February 2021

External videos
- 180th Anniversary
- Part 1: Messages from British parliamentarians
- Part 2: Messages from British parliamentarians and activists

There was another group of British parliamentarians and activists who partnered with Stand with Hong Kong to create commemorative YouTube videos for the occasion in which they commemorated the 180th anniversary and took the opportunity to express their solidarity with Hong Kongers regarding the democratic and human rights issues they had to endure.

Participants of Commemorative Videos
Individual	Organisation/Political Party
Chris Patten	Conservative
Sir Iain Duncan Smith MP	Conservative
Sir Roger Gale MP	Conservative
Virendra Sharma MP	Labour
Sir David Amess MP	Conservative
Baroness Cox	Crossbench
Baroness Bennett of Manor Castle	Green
Afzal Khan MP	Labour
Nickie Aiken MP	Conservative
Christine Jardine MP	Liberal Democrat
Ian Paisley MP	Democratic Unionist
Benedict Rogers	Hong Kong Watch
The Whitehouse Consultancy	The Whitehouse Consultancy

== Debate ==
Quite a few in Hong Kong see Foundation Day as the birthday of Hong Kong, but not everyone agrees.

Though not always, those who regard Foundation Day as Hong Kong’s birthday often attribute the success of modern Hong Kong to the British rule, which began on Foundation Day.

Some criticise the day as colonial nostalgia.

But the Chinese-centric view of history is not unopposed. Some point to the fact that many indigenous people, especially the Tankas, who had been subject to centuries of despise and oppression by the Han Chinese since the Qin military campaign against the Baiyue, decided to collaborate with and provide much assistance to the British forces in the war in exchange for British protection in the future.

== Merchandise ==
Even though the founding of Hong Kong occurred in the distant past in 1841, this episode of history still provides inspiration to some creators and designers in the cultural and creative industries today. The history related to Foundation Day has inspired the creation of different local merchandise from time to time, such as handbags, clothes, perfume, calendars etc.
