= Foundation Day =

Various national holidays

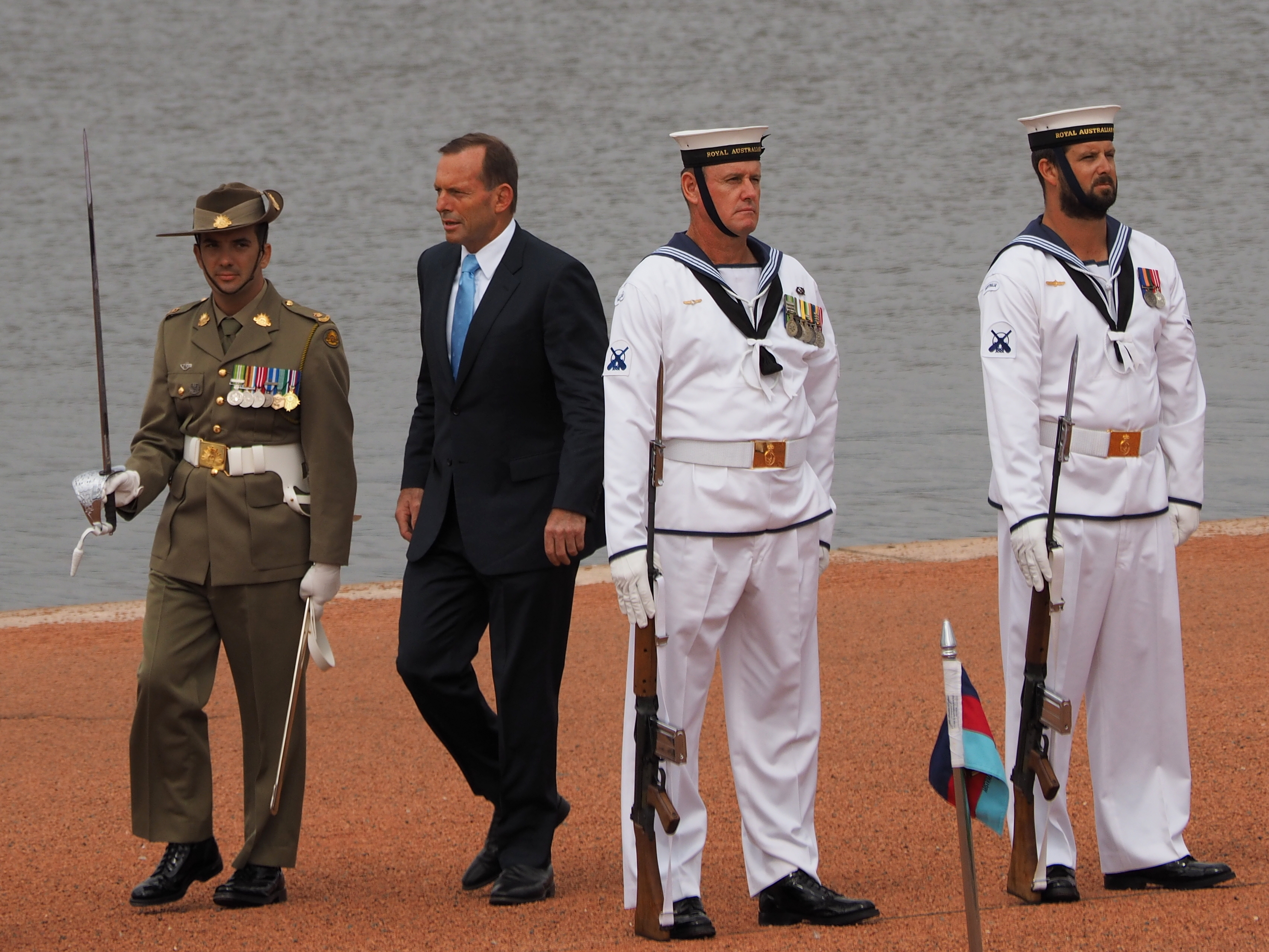
Australian Prime Minister Tony Abbott inspecting the Australia's Federation Guard during the Australia Day celebrations in 2015.

Foundation Day is a designated date on which celebrations mark the founding of a nation, state or a creation of a military unit. This day is for countries that came into existence without the necessity of gaining independence. The term overlaps with national days.

== Background ==
Older countries that use some other event of special significance as their national day. This signals the use of a "class" of National Days, that are equally important in the foundation of the nation, and a "class" of less important official public holidays. This holiday can be symbolised by the date of becoming republic or a significant date for a patron saint or a ruler (birthday, accession, removal, etc.) as the starting point of the nation's history. Often the day is not called "Foundation Day" but serves and can be considered as one.

== Examples ==
=== Asia ===
- Double Ten Day: outbreak of the Wuchang Uprising China and founding of the Republic of China (1911)
- Gaecheonjeol: (English- National Foundation Day) public holiday in South Korea Also, celebrating the creation of Modern-day Korea in the year 2333 BCE
- Hong Kong Foundation Day on 26 January, the anniversary of the founding of Hong Kong as a British colony (until 1997)
- National Foundation Day, national holiday in Japan, celebrating the founding of the nation and the imperial line by its first emperor
- Republic Day in India: becoming the first republic in the British Commonwealth of Nations, 1950
- Saudi National Day: the end of the 30-year campaign to unite the central Arabian lands to found the modern state, 1932
- Day of the Foundation of the Republic (North Korea): commemorates the foundation of the DPRK in 1948

=== Australasia ===
- Foundation Day, one of the precursors of Australia Day, celebrating the day the First Fleet landed at Sydney 1788 (also used separately to mark the foundation of two states)
- Norfolk Island Foundation Day on Norfolk Island on March 6, commemorating the First Fleet settlement under Philip Gidley King in 1788
- Western Australia Day, a public holiday in Western Australia held on the first Monday in June, formerly known as Foundation Day

=== Europe ===
- German Unity Day: unification of West Germany and East Germany and the foundation of the modern German state, 1990
- Statehood Day (Lithuania): commemorates coronation of the first king, Mindaugas
- Swiss National Day: alliance of Uri, Schwyz and Unterwalden against the Holy Roman Empire and the foundation of the Swiss state, 1291

== See also ==
- National day
