= Siu Fa =

Jaguar born in Berlin Zoo in 1987

- Chinese: 小花
- Born: 1987
- Died: June 10, 2008; Education and Exhibition Center of the Hong Kong Zoological and Botanical Gardens

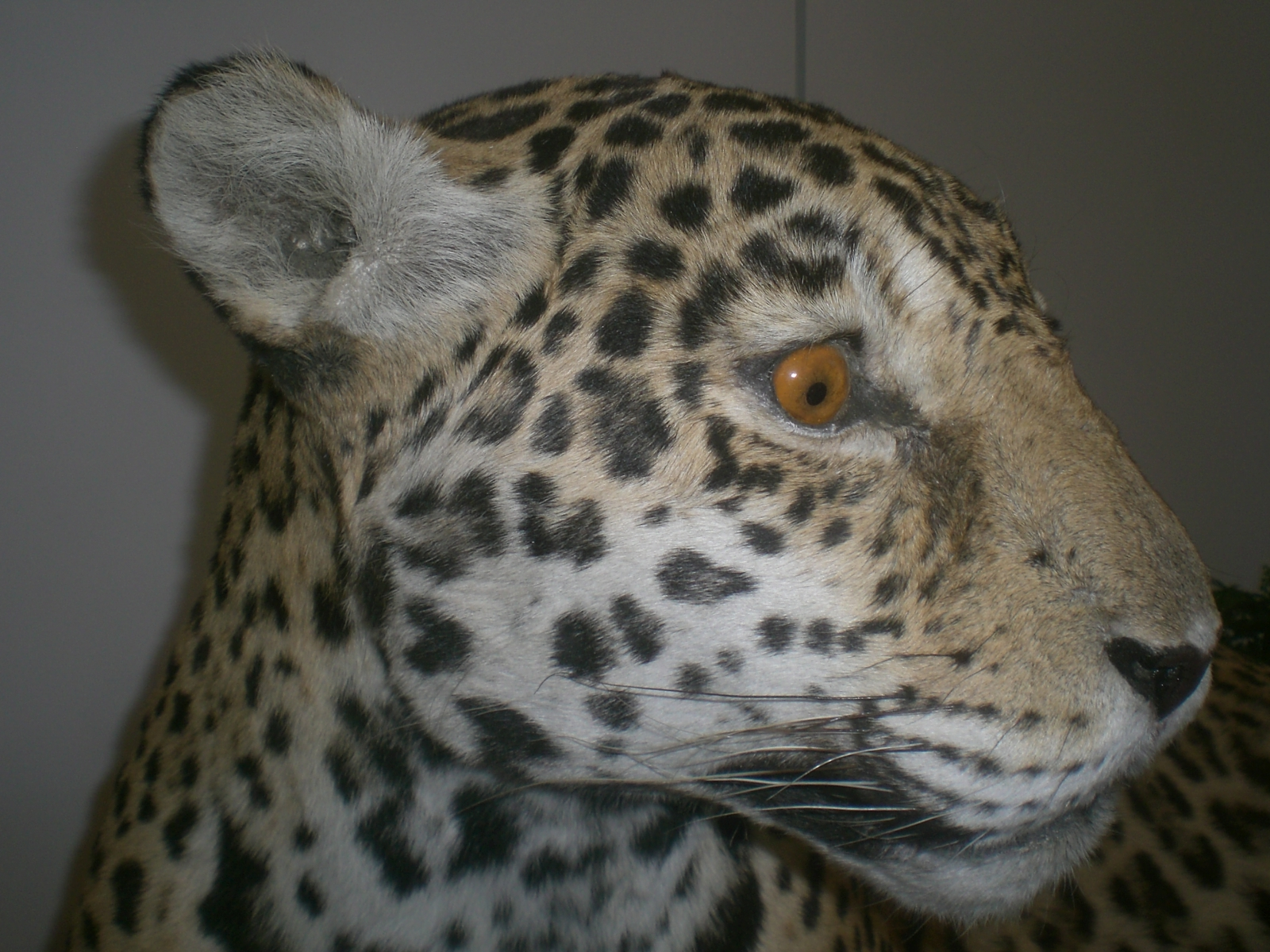
A photo of Jaguar Siu Fa

Siu Fa (meaning "Little Flower"; Chinese: 小花; 1987 - June 10, 2008) was a female jaguar kept in the Hong Kong Zoological and Botanical Gardens. She was born in 1987 at the Berlin Zoo in Germany and arrived in Hong Kong in 1989.

On June 11, 2008, Siu Fa died. After her death, she was made into a specimen and put on permanent display at the Education and Exhibition Center of the Hong Kong Zoological and Botanical Gardens in March 2009.
