= Azaleatin =

- Azaleatin structure

Names
- IUPAC name 3,3′,4′,7-Tetrahydroxy-5-methoxyflavone
- Systematic IUPAC name 2-(3,4-Dihydroxyphenyl)-3,7-dihydroxy-5-methoxy-4H-1-benzopyran-4-one
- Other names 2-(3,4-Dihydroxyphenyl)-3,7-dihydroxy-5-methoxy-4H-chromen-4-one; 5-O-Methylquercetin; Quercetin 5-methyl ether

Identifiers
CAS Number	529-51-1
3D model (JSmol)	Interactive image
ChEBI	CHEBI:2945
ChEMBL	ChEMBL470848
ChemSpider	4444923
PubChem CID	5281604
UNII	SO52512D8G
CompTox Dashboard (EPA)	DTXSID80200945
- InChI: InChI=1S/C16H12O7/c1-22-11-5-8(17)6-12-13(11)14(20)15(21)16(23-12)7-2-3-9(18)10(19)4-7/h2-6,17-19,21H,1H3 Key: RJBAXROZAXAEEM-UHFFFAOYSA-N; InChI=1/C16H12O7/c1-22-11-5-8(17)6-12-13(11)14(20)15(21)16(23-12)7-2-3-9(18)10(19)4-7/h2-6,17-19,21H,1H3 Key: RJBAXROZAXAEEM-UHFFFAOYAA
- SMILES: O=C1c3c(O/C(=C1/O)c2ccc(O)c(O)c2)cc(O)cc3OC

Properties
Chemical formula	C_{16}H_{12}O_{7}
Molar mass	316.26 g/mol
Density	1.634 g/mL
- Except where otherwise noted, data are given for materials in their standard state (at 25 °C [77 °F], 100 kPa). verify (what is ?) Infobox references

Azaleatin is a chemical compound. It is an O-methylated flavonol, a type of flavonoid. It was first isolated from the flowers of Rhododendron mucronatum in 1956 and has since been recorded in 44 other Rhododendron species, in Plumbago capensis, in Ceratostigma willmottiana and in Carya pecan. It has also been found in the leaves of Eucryphia.

== Glycosides ==
Azalein is the 3-O-α-L-rhamnoside of azaleatin.
