= Azalein =

- Azalein structure

Names
- IUPAC name 3′,4′,5-Trihydroxy-7-methoxy-3-(α-L-rhamnopyranosyloxy)flavone
- Systematic IUPAC name 2-(3,4-Dihydroxyphenyl)-5-hydroxy-7-methoxy-3-{[(2S,3R,4R,5R,6S)-3,4,5-trihydroxy-6-methyloxan-2-yl]oxy}-4H-1-benzopyran-4-one
- Other names Azaleatin 3-O-α-L-rhamnoside

Identifiers
CAS Number	29028-02-2
3D model (JSmol)	Interactive image
ChemSpider	26286942
PubChem CID	5321320
UNII	FE4X3MSR8A
CompTox Dashboard (EPA)	DTXSID50487206
- InChI: InChI=1S/C22H22O11/c1-8-16(26)18(28)19(29)22(31-8)33-21-17(27)15-13(30-2)6-10(23)7-14(15)32-20(21)9-3-4-11(24)12(25)5-9/h3-8,16,18-19,22-26,28-29H,1-2H3/t8-,16-,18+,19+,22-/m0/s1 Key: FYSMTINDJSASRR-UFGFRKJLSA-N; InChI=1/C22H22O11/c1-8-16(26)18(28)19(29)22(31-8)33-21-17(27)15-13(30-2)6-10(23)7-14(15)32-20(21)9-3-4-11(24)12(25)5-9/h3-8,16,18-19,22-26,28-29H,1-2H3/t8-,16-,18+,19+,22-/m0/s1 Key: FYSMTINDJSASRR-UFGFRKJLBS
- SMILES: CC1C(C(C(C(O1)OC2=C(OC3=CC(=CC(=C3C2=O)OC)O)C4=CC(=C(C=C4)O)O)O)O)O

Properties
Chemical formula	C_{22}H_{22}O_{11}
Molar mass	462.407 g·mol^{−1}
Density	1.683 g/mL
Melting point	181 to 185 °C (358 to 365 °F; 454 to 458 K)
- Except where otherwise noted, data are given for materials in their standard state (at 25 °C [77 °F], 100 kPa). verify (what is ?) Infobox references

Azalein is a chemical compound. It is a flavonol, a type of flavonoid. It is the 3-O-α-L-rhamnoside of azaleatin. It can be found in the flowers of Plumbago and Rhododendron species.
