= Gilbert Ledward =

English sculptor

- Photo portrait of Gilbert Ledward by Bassano Ltd (1937)
- Born: 23 January 1888
- Died: 21 June 1960 (aged 72)
- Known for: Sculpture
- Father: Richard Arthur Ledward
- Relatives: Percy Hague Jowett (brother-in-law)
- Awards: Medal of Merit (Czech Republic); Otto Beit Medal

Gilbert Ledward OBE RA (23 January 1888 – 21 June 1960), was an English sculptor.

He won the British Prix de Rome for sculpture in 1913, and in World War I served in the Royal Garrison Artillery and later as a war artist. He was professor of sculpture at the Royal College of Art and in 1937 was elected a Royal Academician. He became president of the Royal Society of British Sculptors and a trustee of the Royal Academy.

== Early life ==
Born in Chelsea in west London, Ledward was the third of the four children of Richard Arthur Ledward (1857–1890), a sculptor, by his marriage to Mary Jane Wood. His grandfather, Richard Perry Ledward, had been a Staffordshire master potter with the firm of Pinder, Bourne & Co. of Burslem. His father died when Ledward was only two. He was educated at St Mark's College, Chelsea until 1901, when his mother took the family to live in Germany. In 1905, Ledward began to train as a sculptor at the Royal College of Art under Édouard Lantéri, and in November 1910 he proceeded to the Royal Academy Schools.

== Career ==
In 1913 Ledward won both the British Prix de Rome scholarship for sculpture and the Royal Academy's travelling award and gold medal. During the summer of 1914, he travelled throughout Italy, producing sketchbooks now held by the Royal Academy of Arts, but his travels were ended by the outbreak of the Great War at the end of August. He was commissioned into the Royal Garrison Artillery and was later mentioned in despatches. In 1917 he was fighting in Italy, and in April 1918 he was recalled to England, to be seconded to the Ministry of Information as a war artist. He produced reliefs for the Imperial War Museum, generally of soldiers in action.

After the war, he was greatly in demand as a sculptor of war memorials. From 1927 to 1929 he was professor of sculpture at the Royal College of Art.

In 1934 he established a company called 'Sculptured Memorials and Headstones', which promoted better design of memorials in English churchyards. The firm's supporters included Eric Gill and Edwin Lutyens. In 1936, Ledward designed four sculpted allegorical figures on the front of The Adelphi Building facing the River Thames in London.

In 1937 Ledward was elected a Royal Academician, having been an associate of the Royal Academy since 1932. He was seen as loyal to the values of the Academy, a defender of its academic traditions, but also ready to support good modern work. From 1954 to 1956 he was president of the Royal Society of British Sculptors and in 1956 was appointed an Officer of the Order of the British Empire. In 1956 he became a trustee of the Royal Academy.

== Output ==
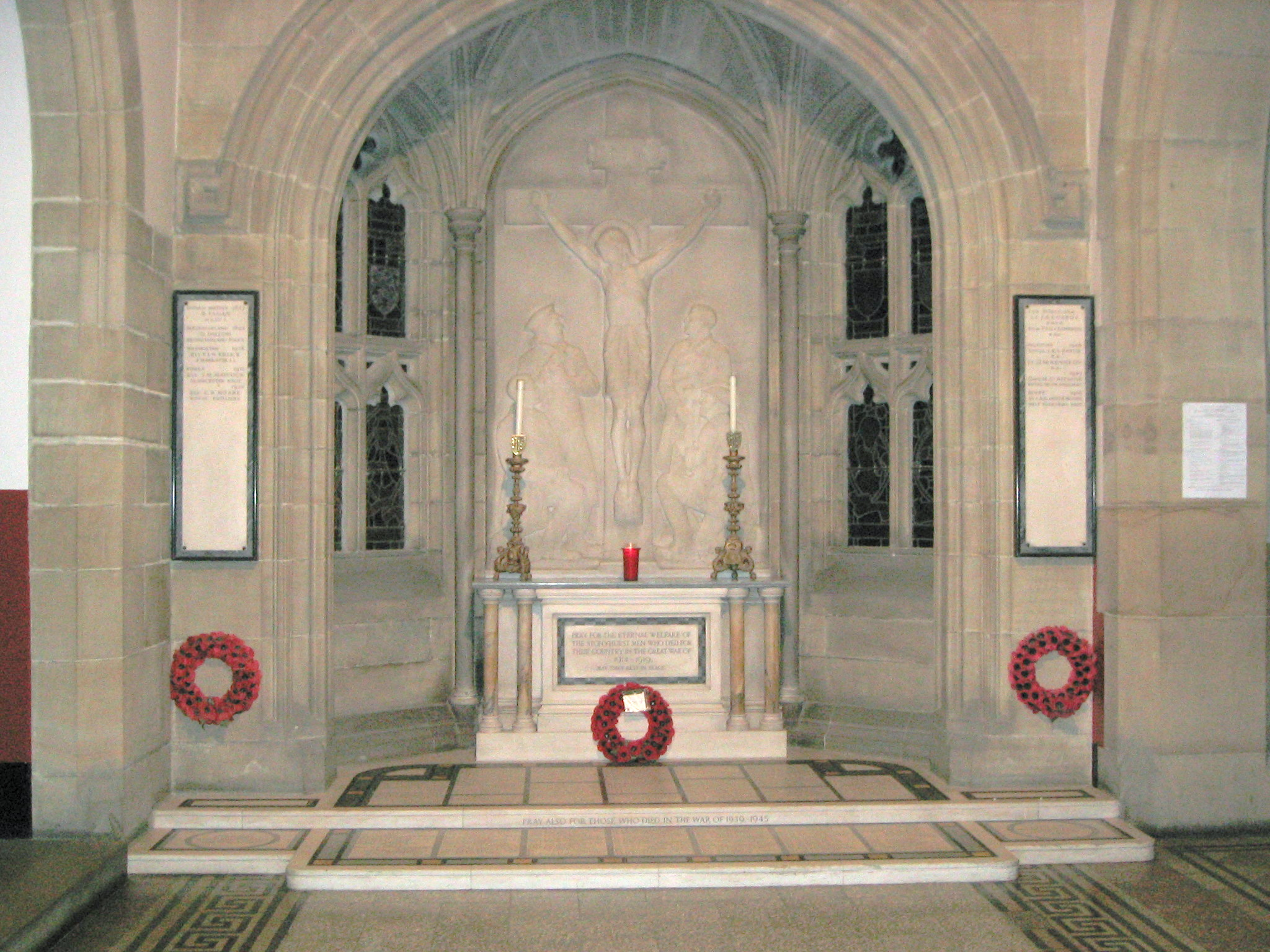
Ledward's War Memorial at Stonyhurst

Drilled in late nineteenth-century conventions, Ledward remained loyal to representational art. He was strong in composition, less conventional than Gill and less radical than Jagger, and was seen as representing the sculptural establishment.

In 1913 he gained his first major commission, a stone calvary for the church of Bourton-on-the-Water. An early figure in bronze, called Awakening, can be seen in Roper's Garden on the Chelsea Embankment.

Ledward's commissions for war memorials after the First World War included bronze sculptures for H. Chalton Bradshaw's Guards Memorial in Horse Guards Parade, London (1922-1925); two lions for the Ploegsteert Memorial to the Missing, commissioned by the Imperial War Graves Commission; and war memorials at Stockport War Memorial Art Gallery, Abergavenny, Blackpool, Harrogate, and Stonyhurst College (1920), the last of which took the form of a marble altar relief (pictured). To the same period belongs his neoclassical marble figure of Britannia for the Hall of Memory at Stockport.

From the late 1920s, Ledward worked less on models to be cast into bronze and more in direct carving of stone, although he made bronze statues of King George V for Kampala, Uganda, in 1939, and for Nairobi, Kenya, in 1940, and another of King George VI for Hong Kong in 1947. His portrait busts in marble include those of Bishop de Labilliere (1944), the actress Rachel Gurney (1945), and Admiral Sir Martin Dunbar-Nasmith VC (1947). His war memorials after the Second World War include the Combined Services Memorial in Westminster Abbey (1948) dedicated to the Royal Navy Submarine Service, the Commandos and the Airborne Forces and Special Air Service.

Ledward designed the bronze figures of Saint Nicholas and Saint Christopher at the Hospital for Sick Children in Great Ormond Street (1952), the fountain in Sloane Square (1953), the new Great Seal of the Realm of 1953 and the 1953 crown coin for the coronation of Elizabeth II, of which more than five million were minted. In 1957, he created a memorial to the second Duke of Westminster in St Mary's Church, Eccleston, Cheshire. His last work was a stone frieze with the title Vision and Imagination for Barclays Bank in Old Bond Street, in the West End of London. When the building was demolished in 1995, the frieze was saved from destruction by the Public Monuments and Sculpture Association. After a failed attempt to install it in St George's Hospital in Tooting, the dismantled frieze was handed over to Public Monuments and Sculpture Association member Don Riley.

=== Selected works ===
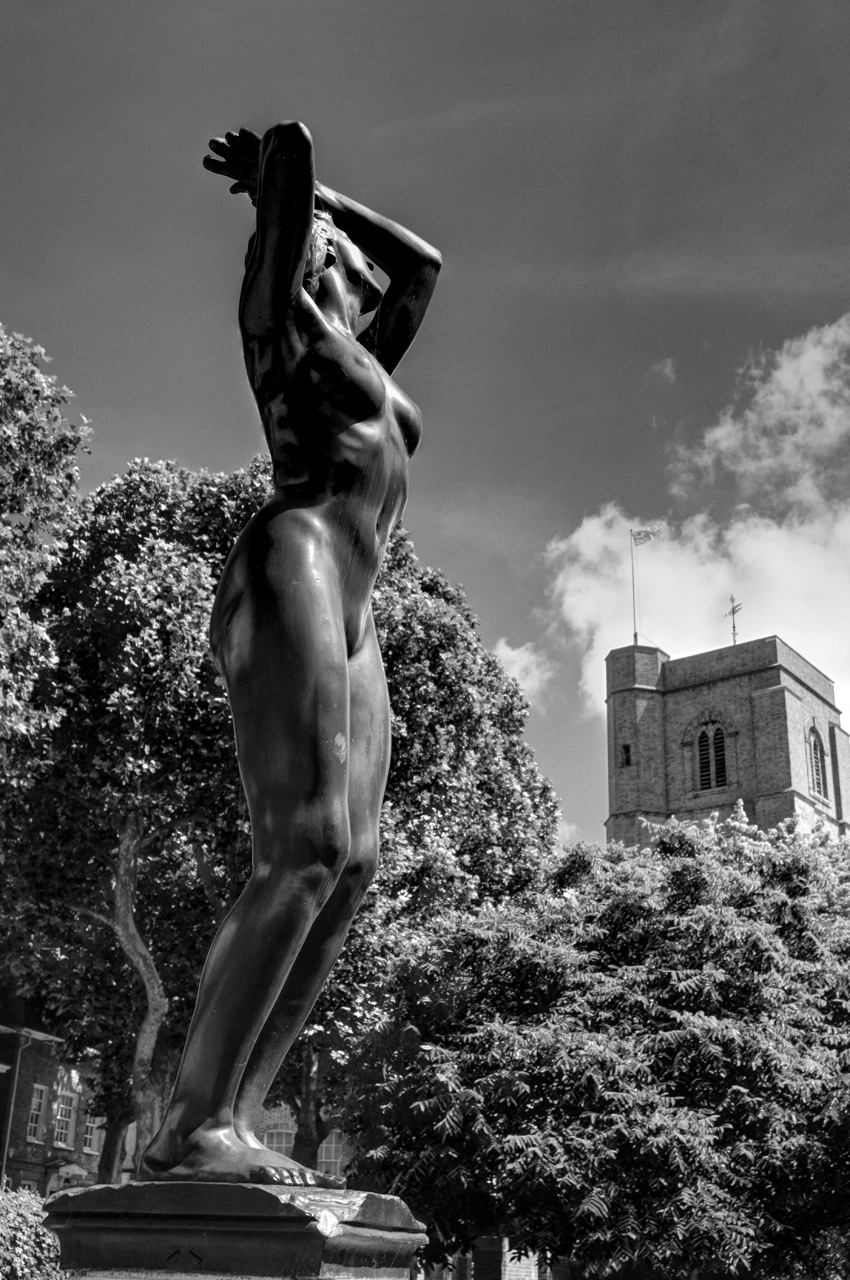
Awakening

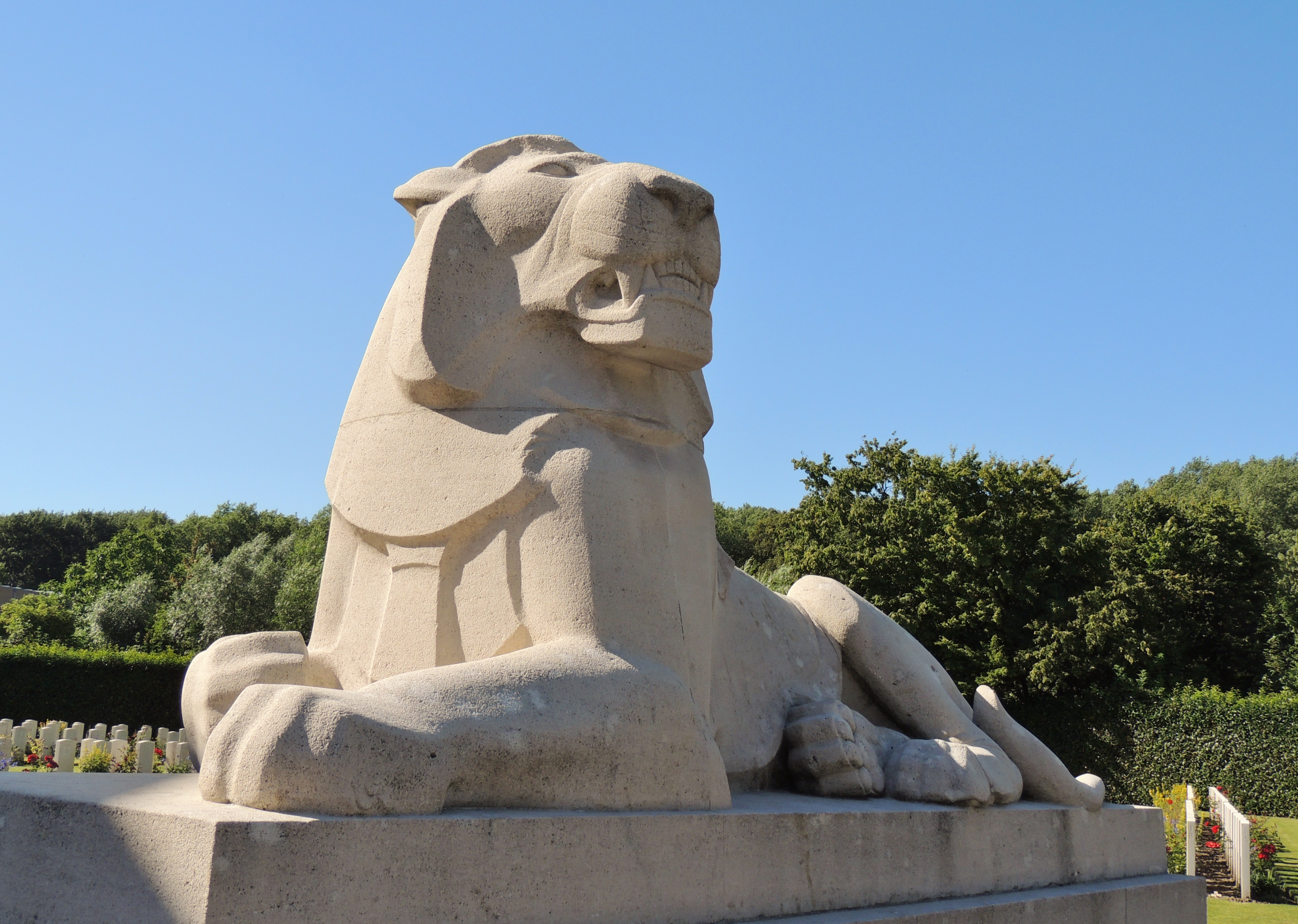
Lions on the Ploegsteert Memorial, Belgium

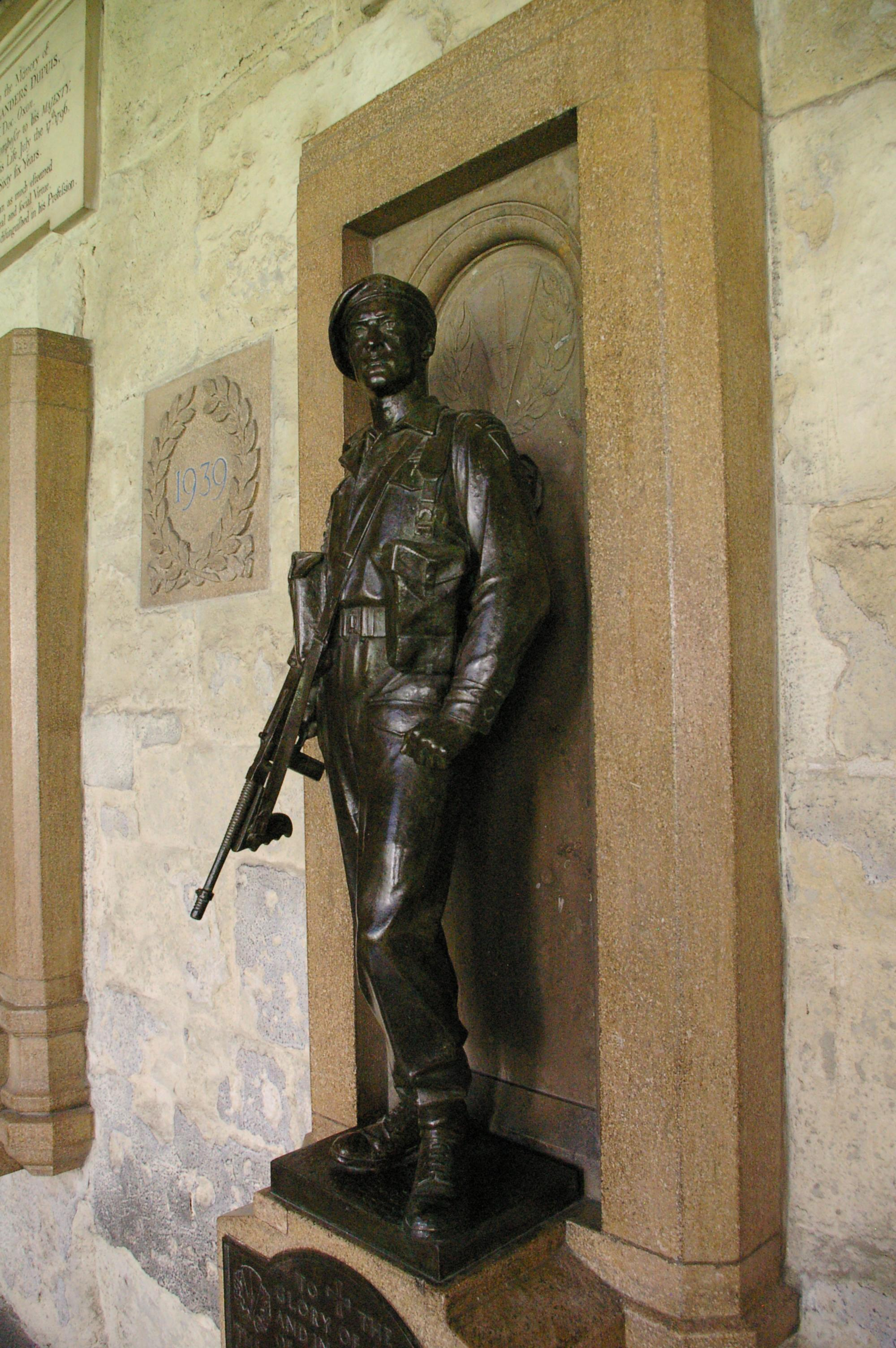
Combined Services Memorial, Westminster Abbey, London

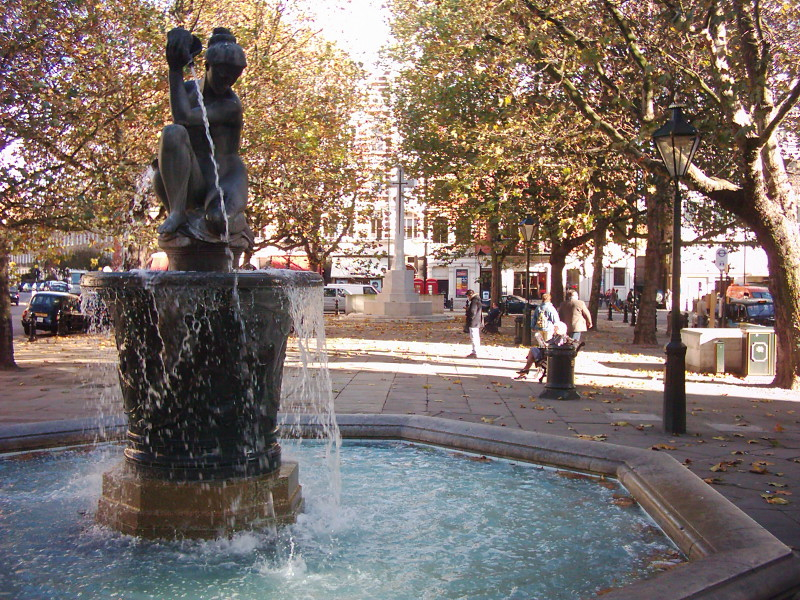
Venus, Sloane Square, London

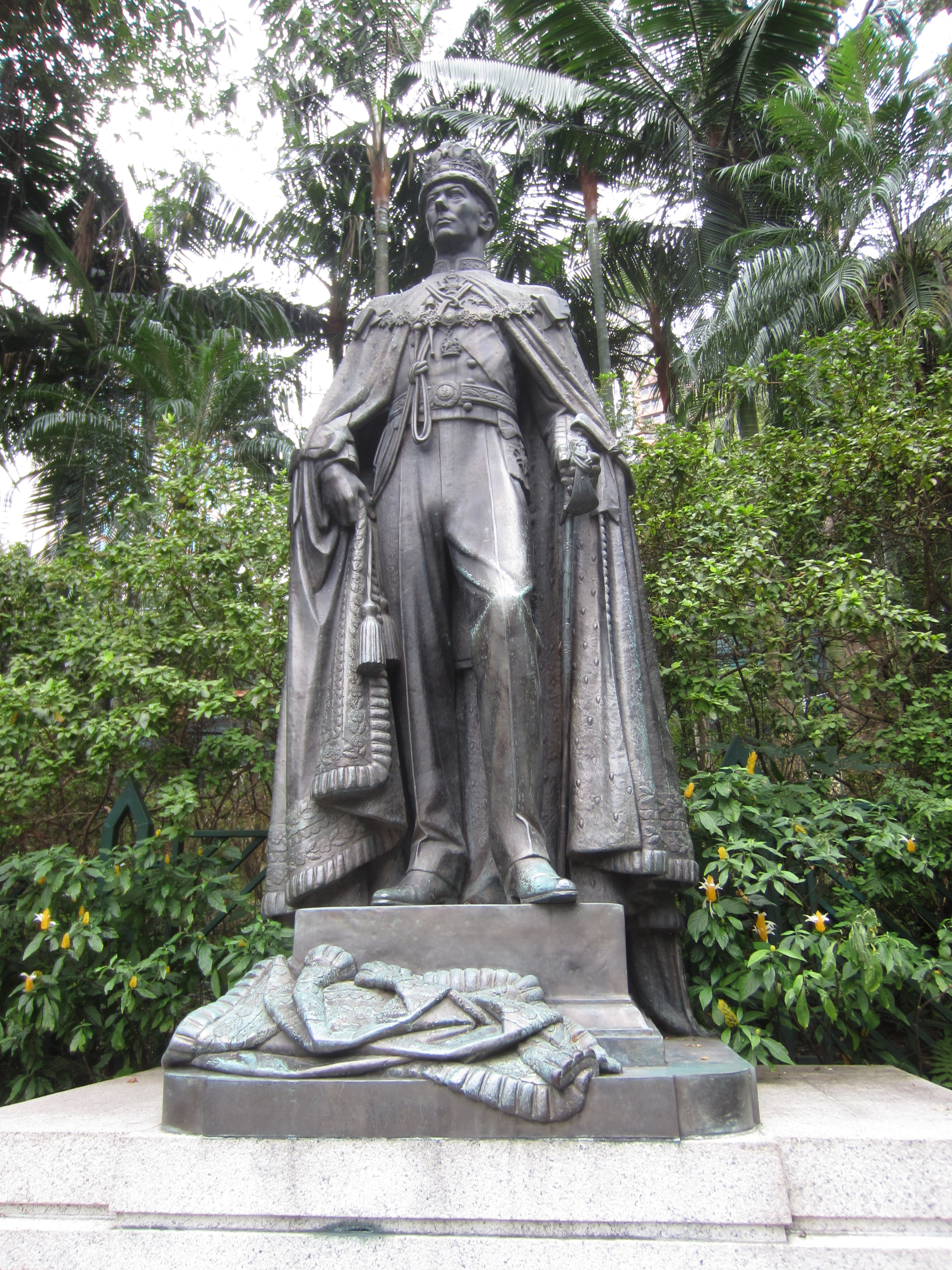
Statue of George VI, Hong Kong Zoo

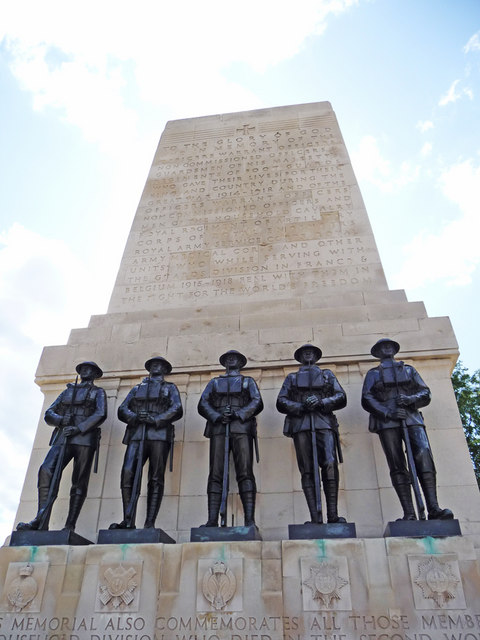
Guards Memorial, Horseguards Parade, London

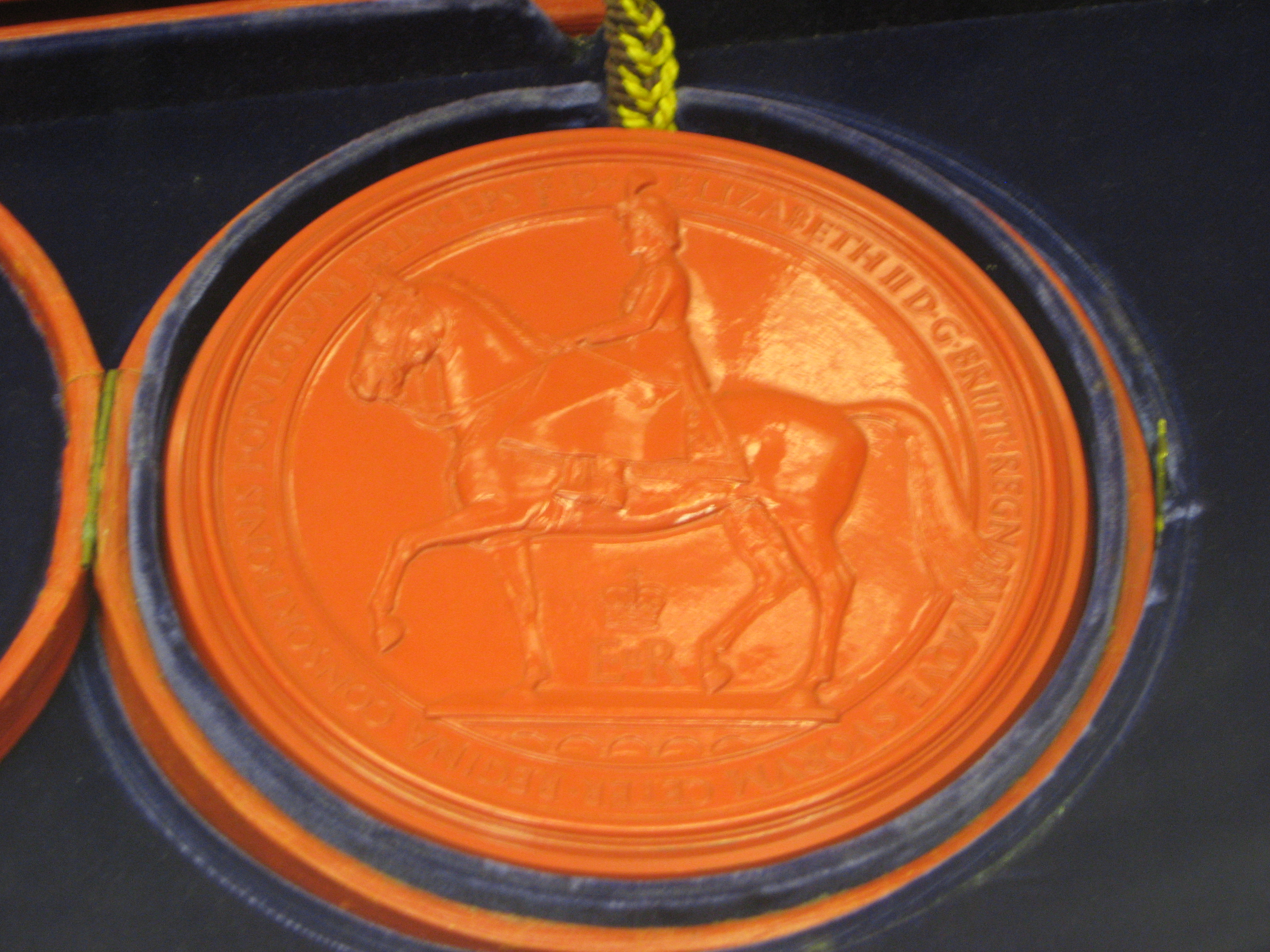
Impression of Ledward's Great Seal of the Realm, 1953

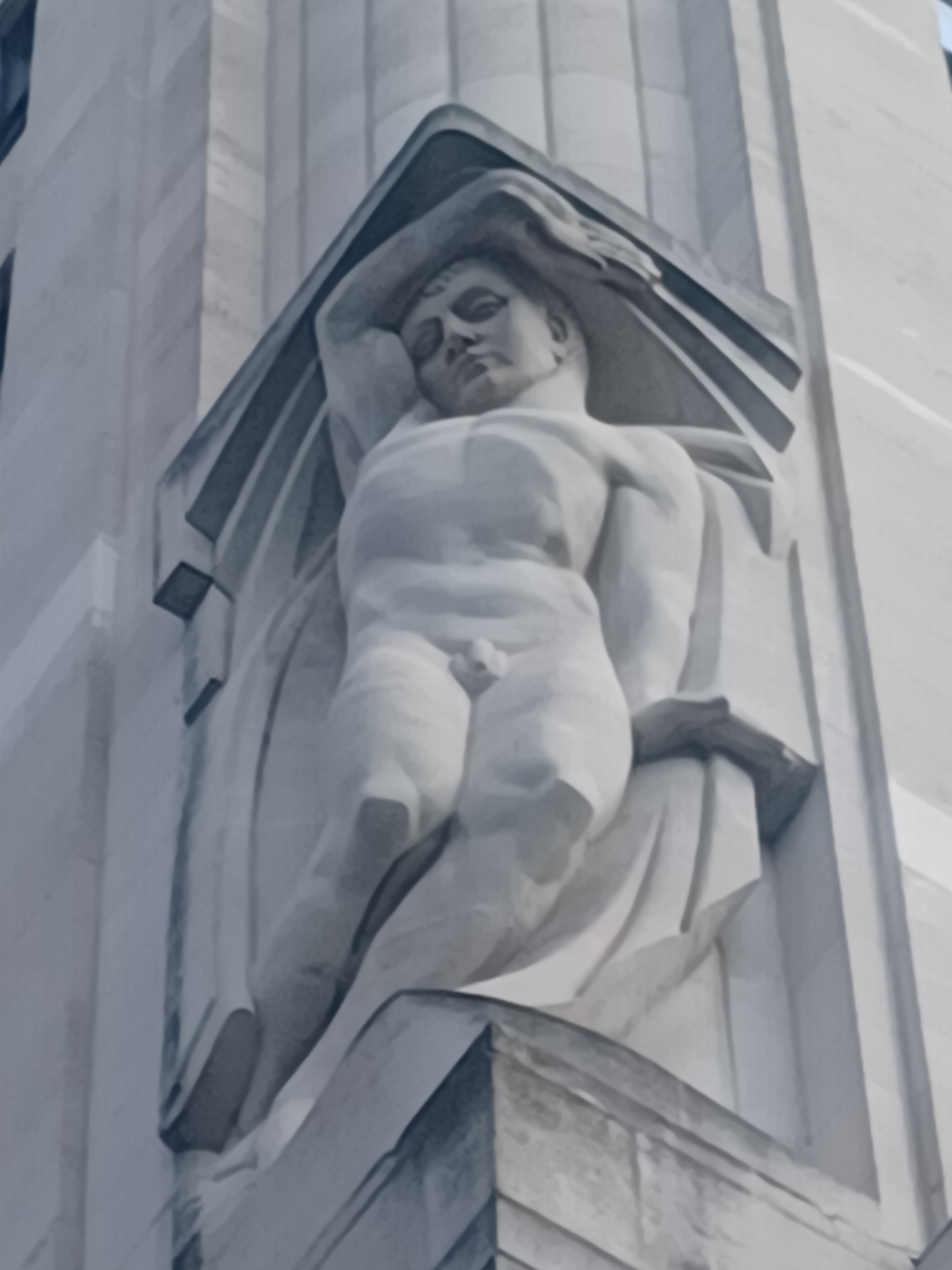
Adelphi building, London. Titled 'Inspiration', 1938

== Marriage and death ==
In 1911, Ledward married Margery Beatrix Cheesman, and they later had two daughters and a son. He was a member of the Chelsea Arts Club and in Who's Who gave his recreation as sailing. He died at number 31, Queen's Gate, London, on 21 June 1960. He is buried along with his wife in the churchyard of St Mary's, Perivale, Middlesex.

== Bibliography ==
- Peyton Skipwith, Gilbert Ledward: 1888-1960: drawings for sculpture: a centenary tribute: 25 January – 19 February 1988 (Fine Art Society, 1988)
- Moriarty, Catherine (2003). The Sculpture of Gilbert Ledward. Henry Moore Foundation in association with Lund Humphries. ISBN 978-0-85331-831-6.
- Patricia Ledward, Grandmother's Footsteps, a half fact/half fiction tale about the author's grandmother and including many references to her parents: Gilbert (fictional name Bernard) and Margery (fictional name Dorothy). The author herself is named as Vicky. (Macmillan 1966)
