= Richard Arthur Ledward =

English teacher of pottery and sculptor

Richard Arthur Ledward (1857 – 28 October 1890), born in the Staffordshire Potteries in England, was a sculptor and teacher of pottery modelling.

== Life ==
Ledward was born in Burslem, Staffordshire, in 1857; he was a son of Richard Perry Ledward, of the firm Pinder, Bourne & Co. of Burslem. Ledward was employed as modeller by that firm, and studied in the Burslem School of Art; on obtaining a national scholarship he continued his studies at the South Kensington School of Art. There he obtained a gold medal for modelling from the life, and was appointed a master of modelling.

Subsequently he became modelling master at the Westminster School of Art and Blackheath School of Art. He exhibited at the Royal Academy in 1882 and the following years. One work of his, "A Young Mother", attracted favourable notice. He made several well-regarded busts, including those of Henry Broadhurst, William Ewart Gladstone, Sir Philip Cunliffe-Owen, and others.

Ledward lived in Chelsea, and died of rheumatism on 28 October 1890. He was buried at Perivale Church, near Ealing.

== Family ==
In 1883 he married Mary Jane Wood, sister of Ambrose Wood of Hanley. Their children included the sculptor Gilbert Ledward; Hilda, who married the sculptor Newbury Abbot Trent; and Enid, who married the painter Percy Hague Jowett.
