= Chinese War Memorial =

War memorial in Hong Kong

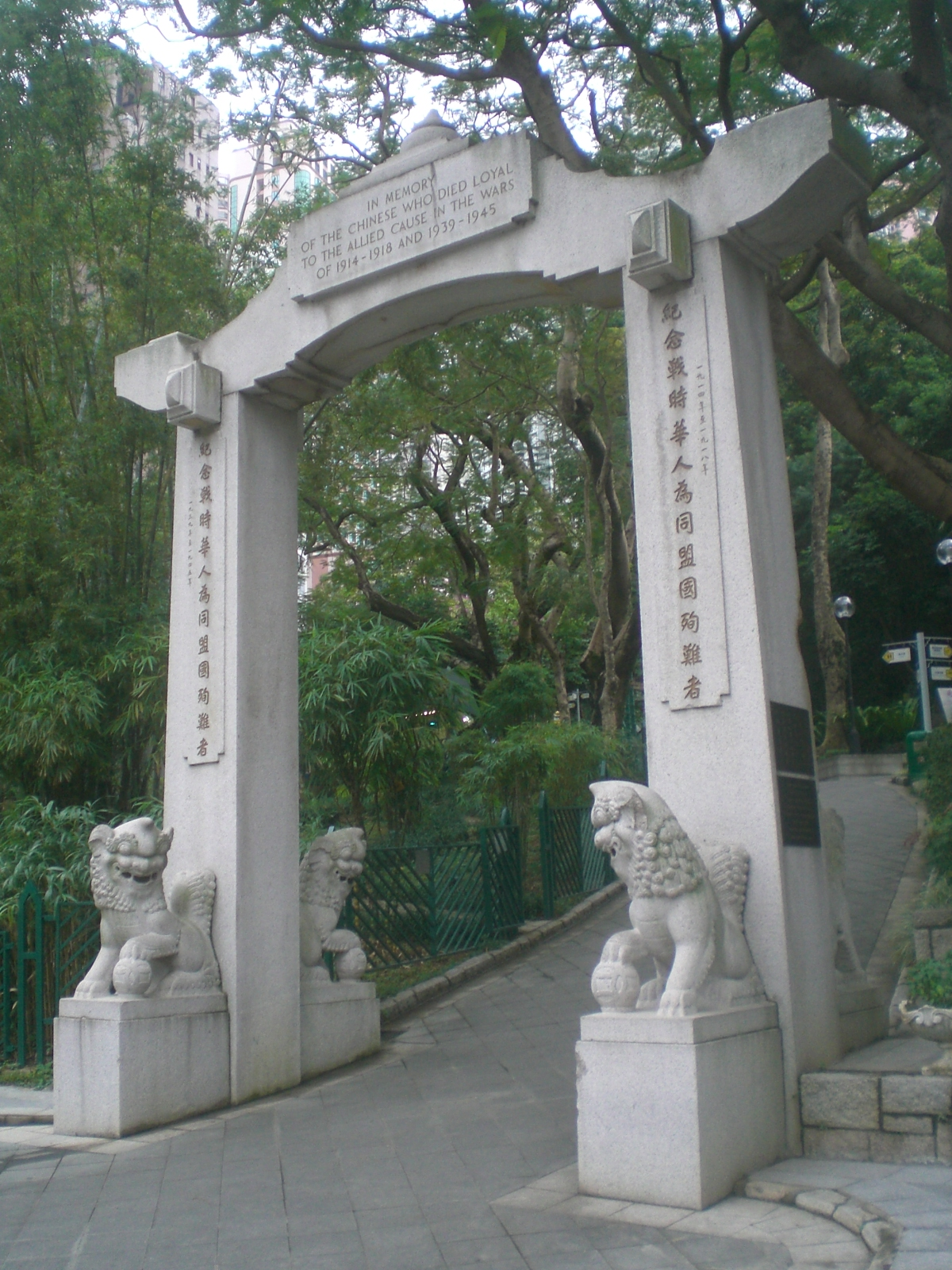
- The memorial in 2009
- Interactive map of Chinese War Memorial
- Location: Hong Kong
- Coordinates: 22.277578°N 114.157136°E

The Chinese War Memorial is installed in the Hong Kong Zoological and Botanical Gardens. Erected in 1928, the memorial originally commemorated Chinese people who died during World War I. The structure was damaged during World War II, then repaired and rededicated to those who died during both conflicts. The Grade 1 confirmed memorial has two stone sculptures of male lions.
