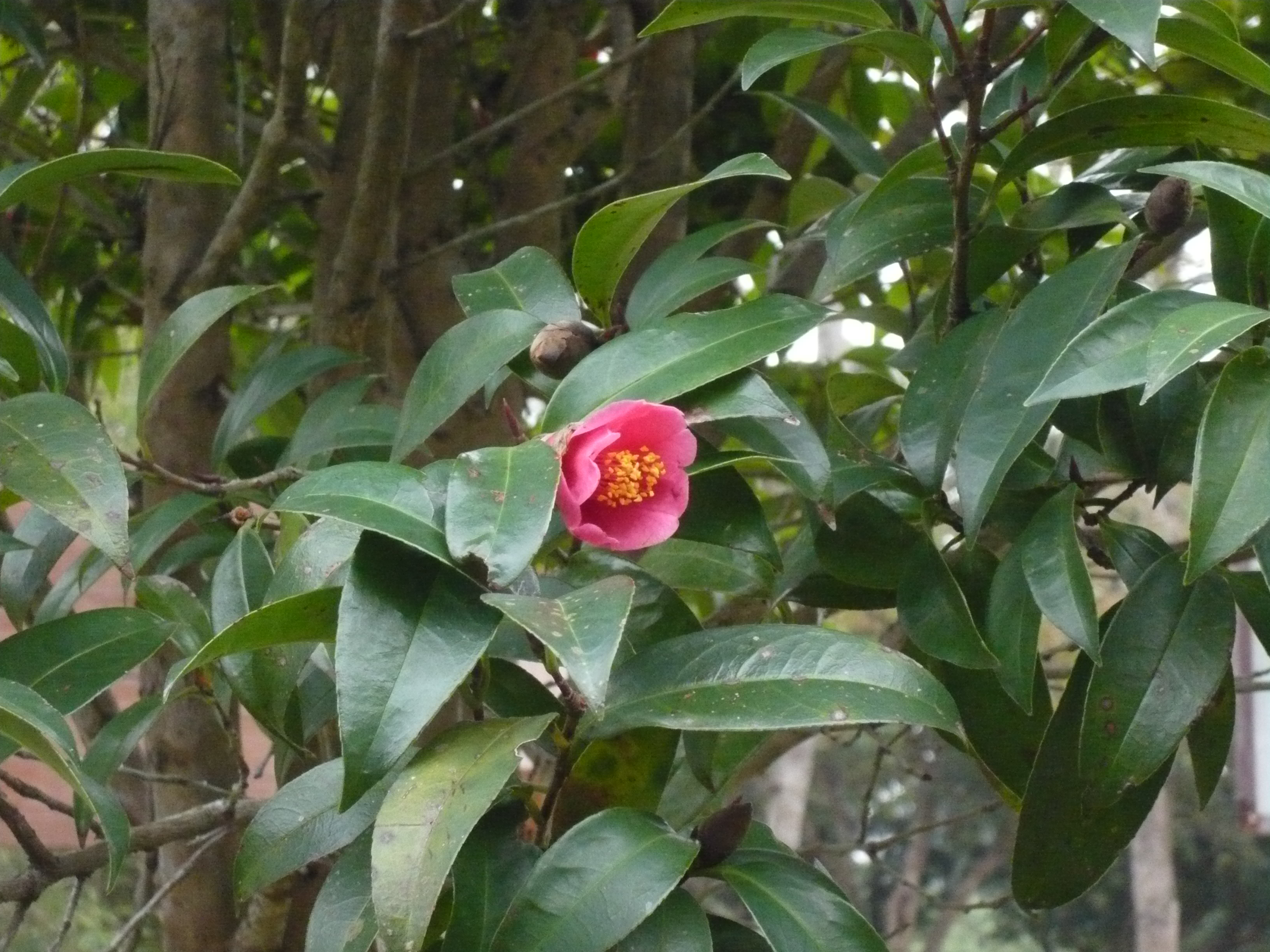

Conservation status
- Endangered (IUCN 3.1)

Scientific classification
- Kingdom: Plantae
- Clade: Tracheophytes
- Clade: Angiosperms
- Clade: Eudicots
- Clade: Asterids
- Order: Ericales
- Family: Theaceae
- Genus: Camellia
- Species: C. hongkongensis

Binomial name
- Camellia hongkongensis Seem.

= Camellia hongkongensis =

Species of tree

Camellia hongkongensis (Chinese: 香港茶; Jyutping: hoeng1 gong2 caa4; lit. 'Hong Kong tea'), the Hong Kong camellia, is a species of camellia.

== Description ==
Camellia hongkongensis is a small evergreen tree which can grow to 10 metres (33 ft) feet tall. Of the camellia species native to Hong Kong, only this species bears red flowers.

Its young branches are reddish brown. The leaves are leathery and oblong with 7–13 cm long. The young branches and leaf are glabrous.

== Distribution ==
In Hong Kong, three individuals of the species were first discovered in a ravine in Victoria Peak by Colonel Eyre in 1849. It was later found in Pok Fu Lam, Mount Nicholson, Mount Parker on Hong Kong Island. It is also found in Guangdong.

Specimens of the Hong Kong camellia are living in the Shing Mun Arboretum public gardens. In Hong Kong, it is a protected species under Forestry Regulations Cap. 96A.

Camellia hongkongensis was introduced to Japan in 1958 from Hong Kong Zoological and Botanical Gardens.

== See also ==
- Grantham's camellia
