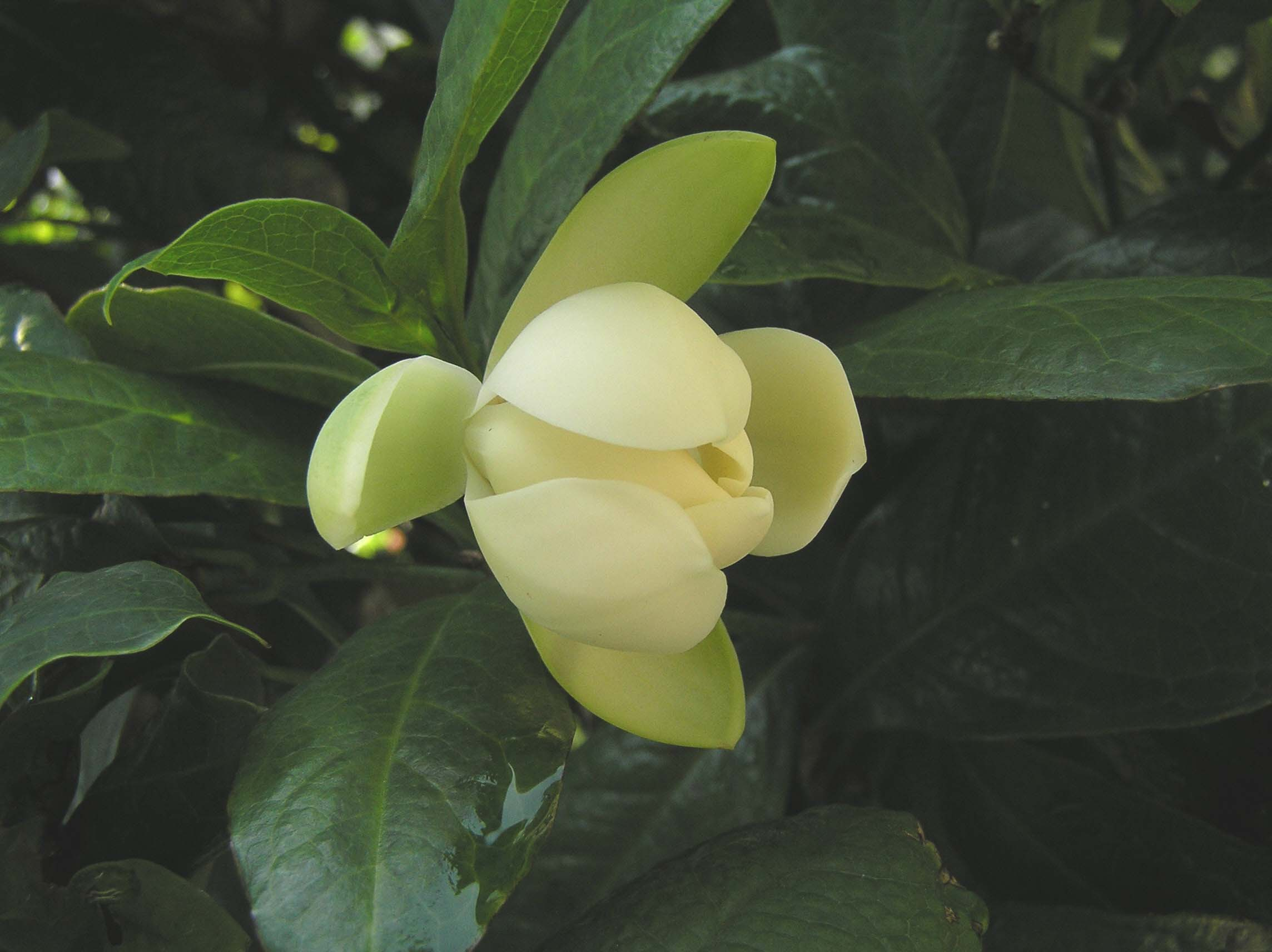
- At the Hong Kong Zoological and Botanical Gardens
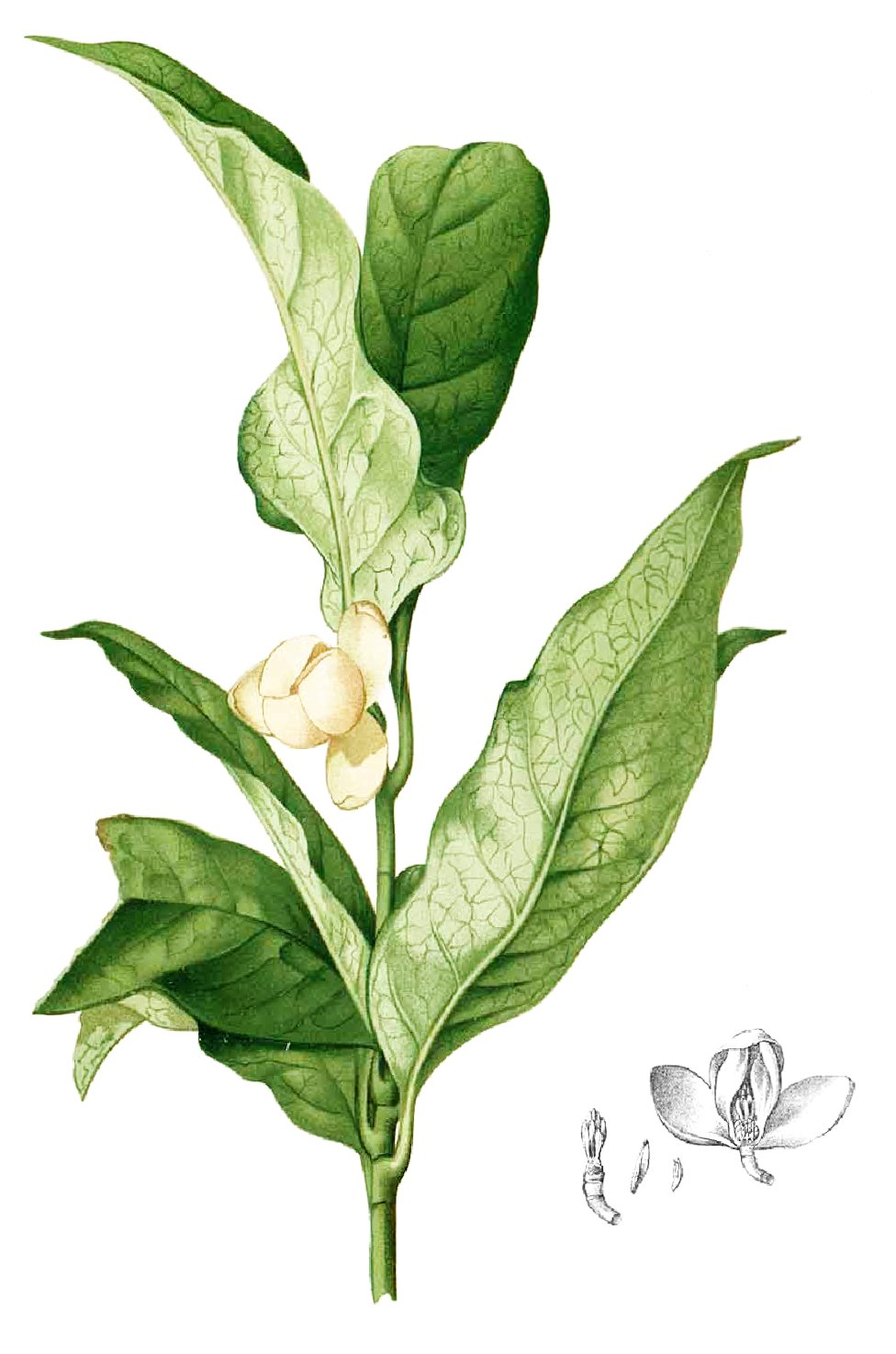
- Botanical illustration

Conservation status
- Data Deficient (IUCN 3.1)

Scientific classification
- Kingdom: Plantae
- Clade: Embryophytes
- Clade: Tracheophytes
- Clade: Spermatophytes
- Clade: Angiosperms
- Clade: Magnoliids
- Order: Magnoliales
- Family: Magnoliaceae
- Genus: Magnolia
- Species: M. coco

Binomial name
- Magnolia coco (Lour.) DC.

Synonyms
- Lirianthe coco (Lour.) N.H.Xia & C.Y.Wu; Liriodendron coco Lour.; Talauma coco (Lour.) Merr.; Gwillimia indica Rottler ex DC.; Liriopsis pumila Spach ex Baill.

= Magnolia coco =

Species of flowering plant

Magnolia coco, the coconut magnolia, is a species of flowering plant in the family Magnoliaceae, native to southern China, Taiwan, and northern Vietnam. A small tree from 7–13 ft (2–4 m) in the garden, it is hardy to zone 9, and can also be kept as a houseplant. It is incorrectly called Magnolia pumila in some sources. In Thailand, it is called yi hoob flower [ยี่หุบ]. In Cambodia, it is call Yi hoop flower (យីហ៊ុប).
