= Hong Kong Zoological and Botanical Gardens =

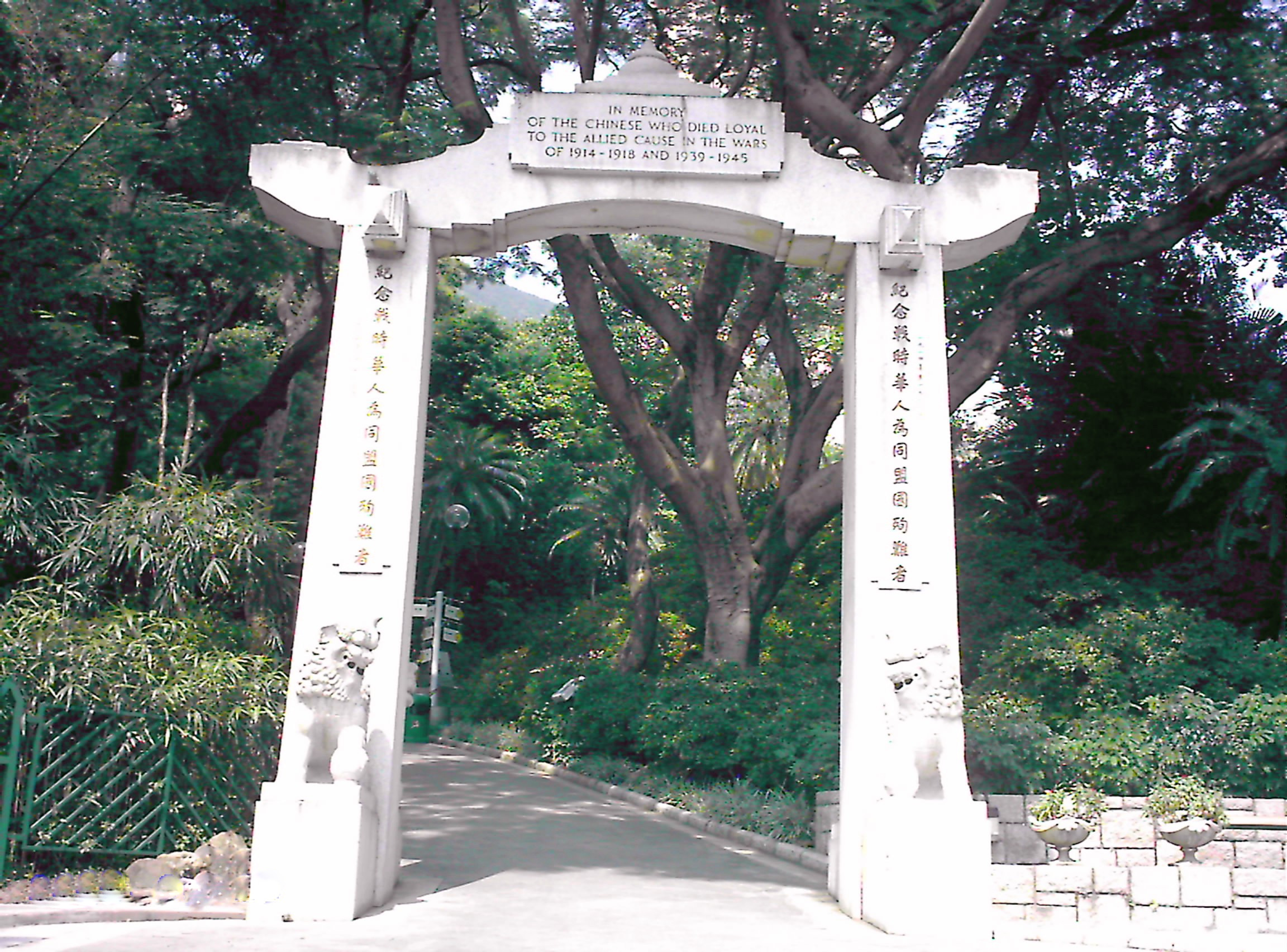
- Memorial Gate for British Chinese Soldiers
- Interactive map of Hong Kong Zoological and Botanical Gardens
- 22°16′40″N 114°9′23″E
- Date opened: 1871; 155 years ago
- Location: Central, Hong Kong
- Land area: 5.6 hectare (14 acres)
- No. of animals: 700+
- Website: www.lcsd.gov.hk/parks/hkzbg/en/index.php

Hong Kong Zoological and Botanical Gardens
- Traditional Chinese: 香港動植物公園
- Simplified Chinese: 香港动植物公园
Transcriptions
Standard Mandarin
- Hanyu Pinyin: Xiānggǎng Dòngzhíwù Gōngyuán
Yue: Cantonese
- Yale Romanization: hēung góng duhng jihk maht gūng yùhn
- Jyutping: Hoeng1 gong2 dung6 zik6 mat6 gung1 jyun4

The Hong Kong Zoological and Botanical Gardens (HKZBG) is one of the oldest zoological and botanical centres in the world, and the oldest park in Hong Kong. Founded in 1864, its first stage was opened to the public in 1871. It occupies an area of 5.6 hectares (14 acres) in Central, on the northern slope of Victoria Peak.

Similar to Hong Kong Park, Hong Kong Zoological and Botanical Gardens provides a natural environment and atmosphere. While physically smaller than Hong Kong Park, it contains more plants, animals and facilities.

== History ==
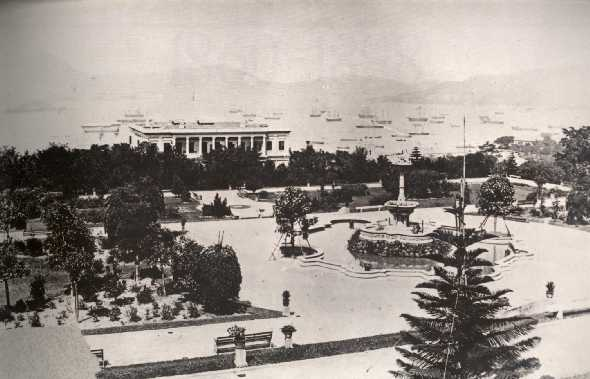
1864 view of the gardens, with Government House and Victoria Harbour in the background

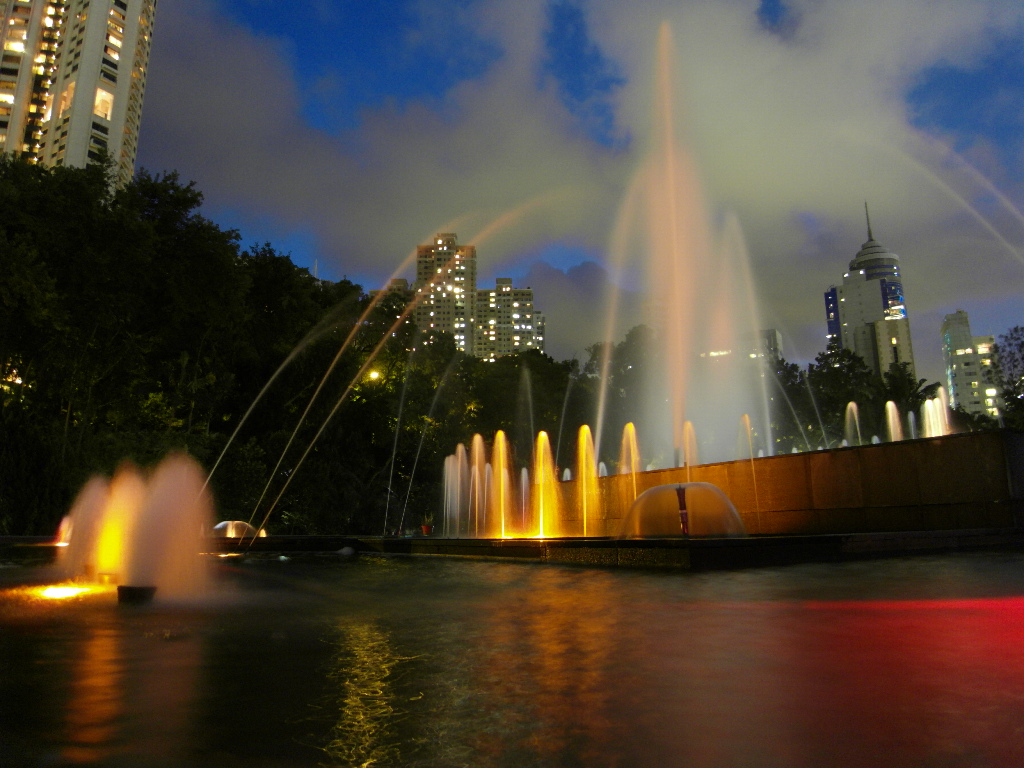
Garden Fountain at night

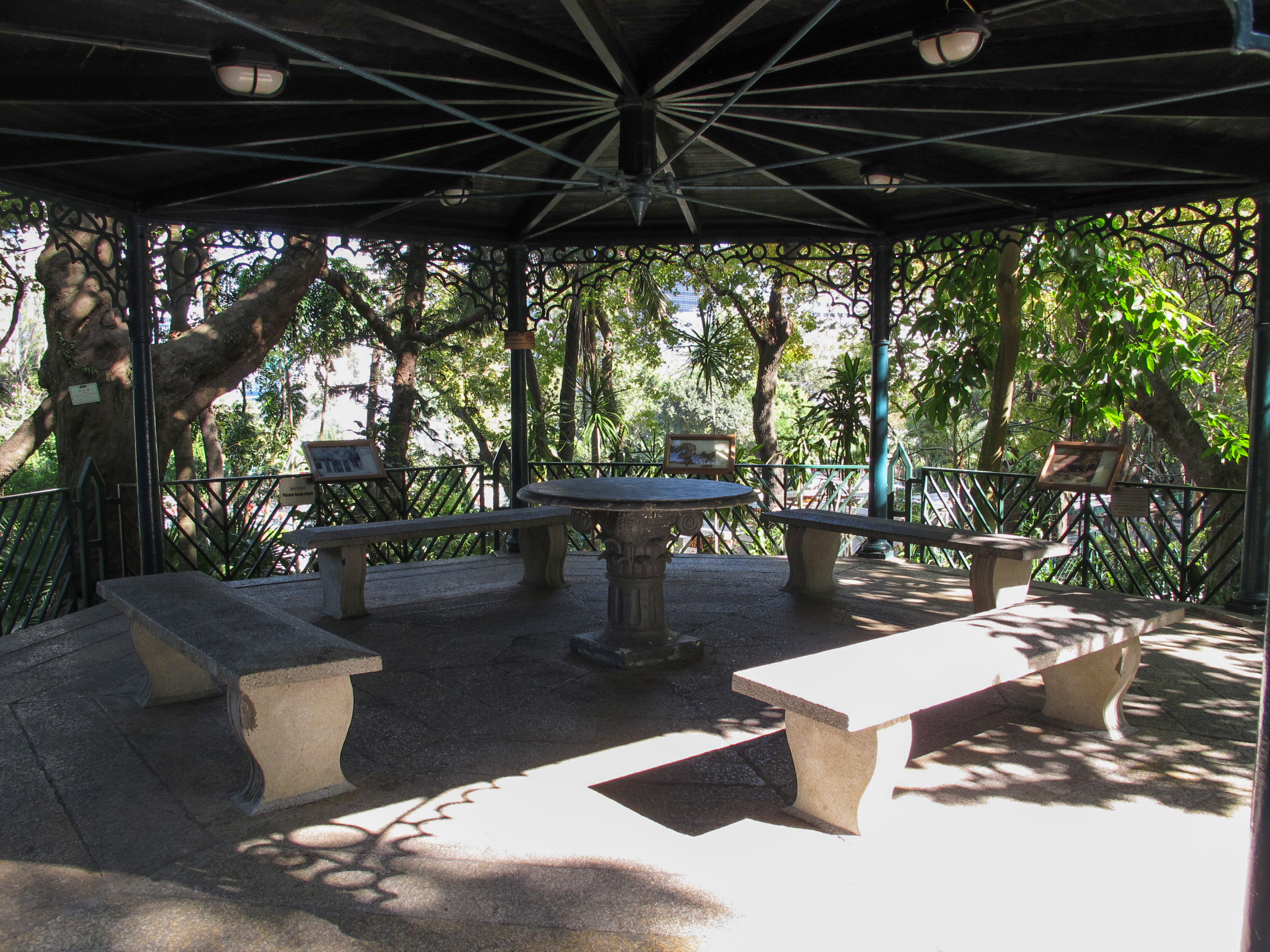
The Pavilion is the oldest structure in HKZBG. It was built in 1866.

The park was previously named Bing Tau Fa Yuen (Chinese: 兵頭花園). "Bing Tau" literally means 'the head of the soldiers' or the 'commander-in-chief'. According to the Hong Kong government's Leisure and Cultural Services Department, it was nicknamed as such by the city's Cantonese community, as it was the former site of the city's Government House. Alternatively, Bing Tau may be the phonetic transliteration of the first two syllables of the word botanical. In the old days, many lovers liked to go there on a date. During the Japanese occupation of Hong Kong, it was renamed as Taishō Kōen (大正公園).

The founder of The Garden Company Limited discussed at the Hong Kong Zoological and Botanical Gardens and came up with the idea of starting a company; therefore, it was named after "Garden" and its Cantonese transliteration "Garden". The park was closed from 1931 to 1933 to allow for the construction of a reservoir under the park.

Many famous people have visited the park under the name of the Wildlife Fund, including Prince Philip, Duke of Edinburgh (in 1983) and Princess Anne of England (in 1988).

== Memorials ==
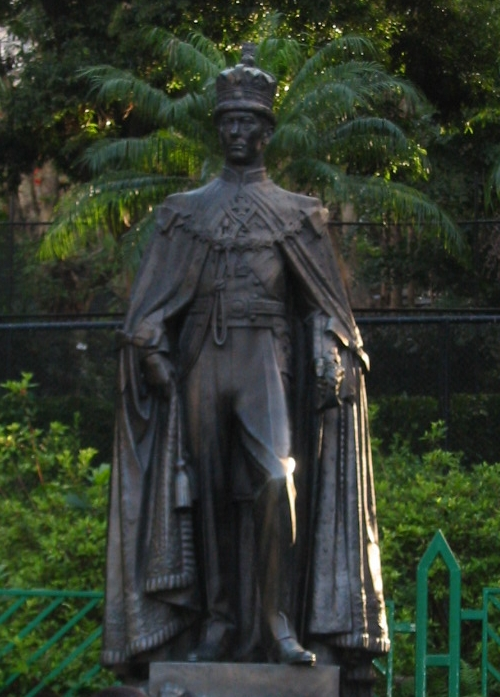
Bronze statue of King George VI

Located at the southern entrance to the gardens, at Upper Albert Road, sits the Chinese War Memorial, which is dedicated to the Chinese who died assisting the Allies during World War I and World War II. The inscription on the lintel reads: "In Memory of the Chinese who died loyal to the Allied cause in the Wars of 1914–1918 and 1939–1945". A granite arch in the shape of a paifang was erected in 1928. Reference to the Second World War was added later.

A bronze statue of King George VI was erected in commemoration of the 100th anniversary of British colonial rule over Hong Kong (1841–1941).

== Plants ==
There are more than 1,000 species of plants in the gardens, mostly indigenous to tropical and sub-tropical regions. It includes some rare species like the dawn redwood and the local Ailanthus. Besides these, some species which can produce flowers throughout the year can also be found there, like the Hong Kong orchid tree.

Different Species are grown in the Thematic gardens in the Hong Kong Zoological and Botanical Gardens.

=== Bamboo Garden ===
This garden grows about ten times bigger than other gardens.

=== Camellia Garden ===
More than 30 species are grown in this garden. Crapnell's camellia (Camellia crapnelliana), Grantham's camellia (Camellia granthamiana) and Hong Kong camellia (Camellia hongkongensis) are native to Hong Kong.

Some introduced rare species such as Yunnan camellia (Camellia reticulata) and golden camellia (Camellia nitidissima and Camellia euphlebia) can also be found in this garden.

=== Magnolia Garden ===
This garden grows five species of magnolia:

- Chinese magnolia (Magnolia coco)
- Yulan (Magnolia denudata)
- Purple magnolia (Magnolia liliiflora)
- Saucer magnolia (Magnolia × soulangeana)
- Southern magnolia (Magnolia grandiflora).

=== Greenhouse ===
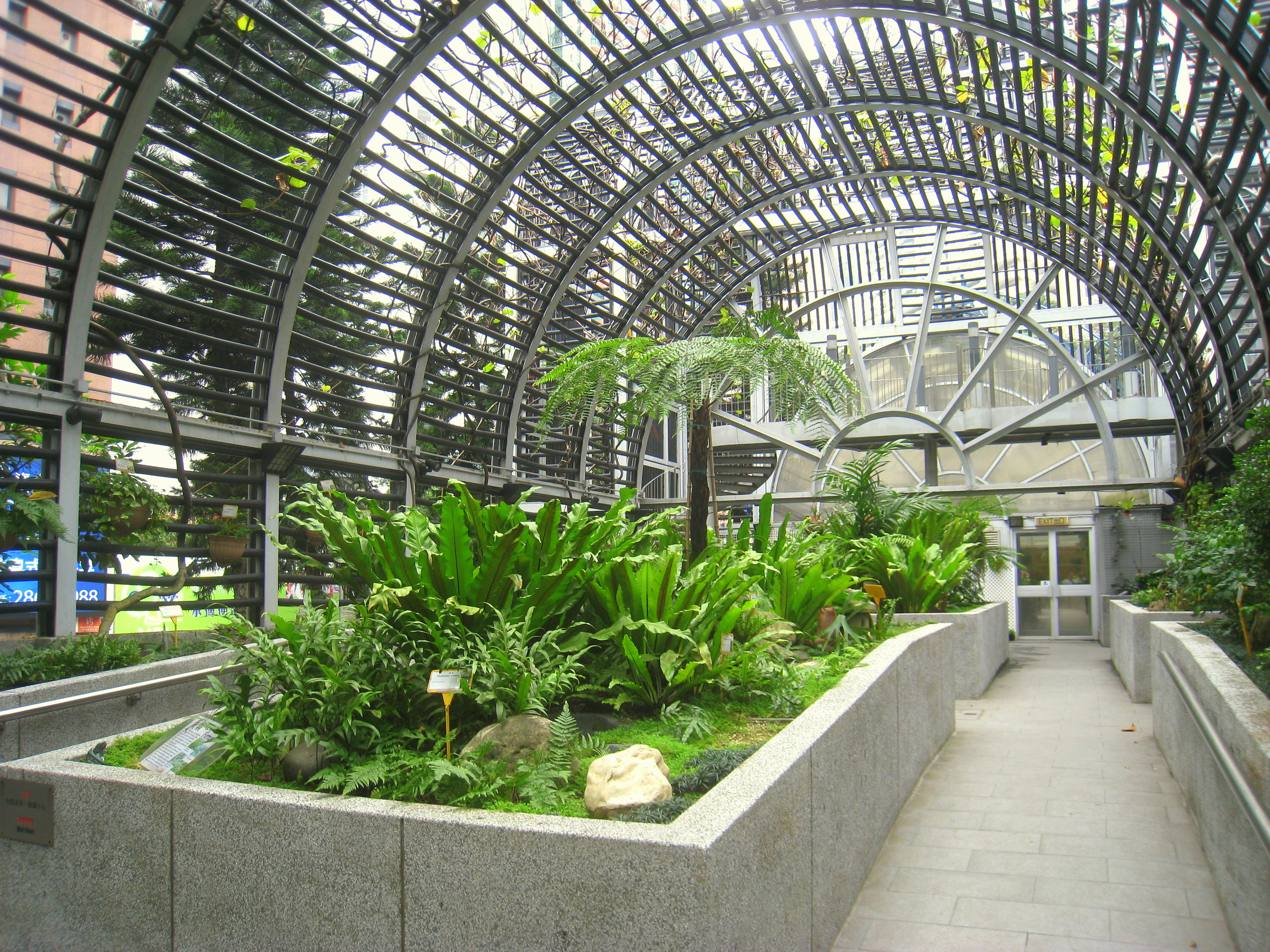
Greenhouse entrance

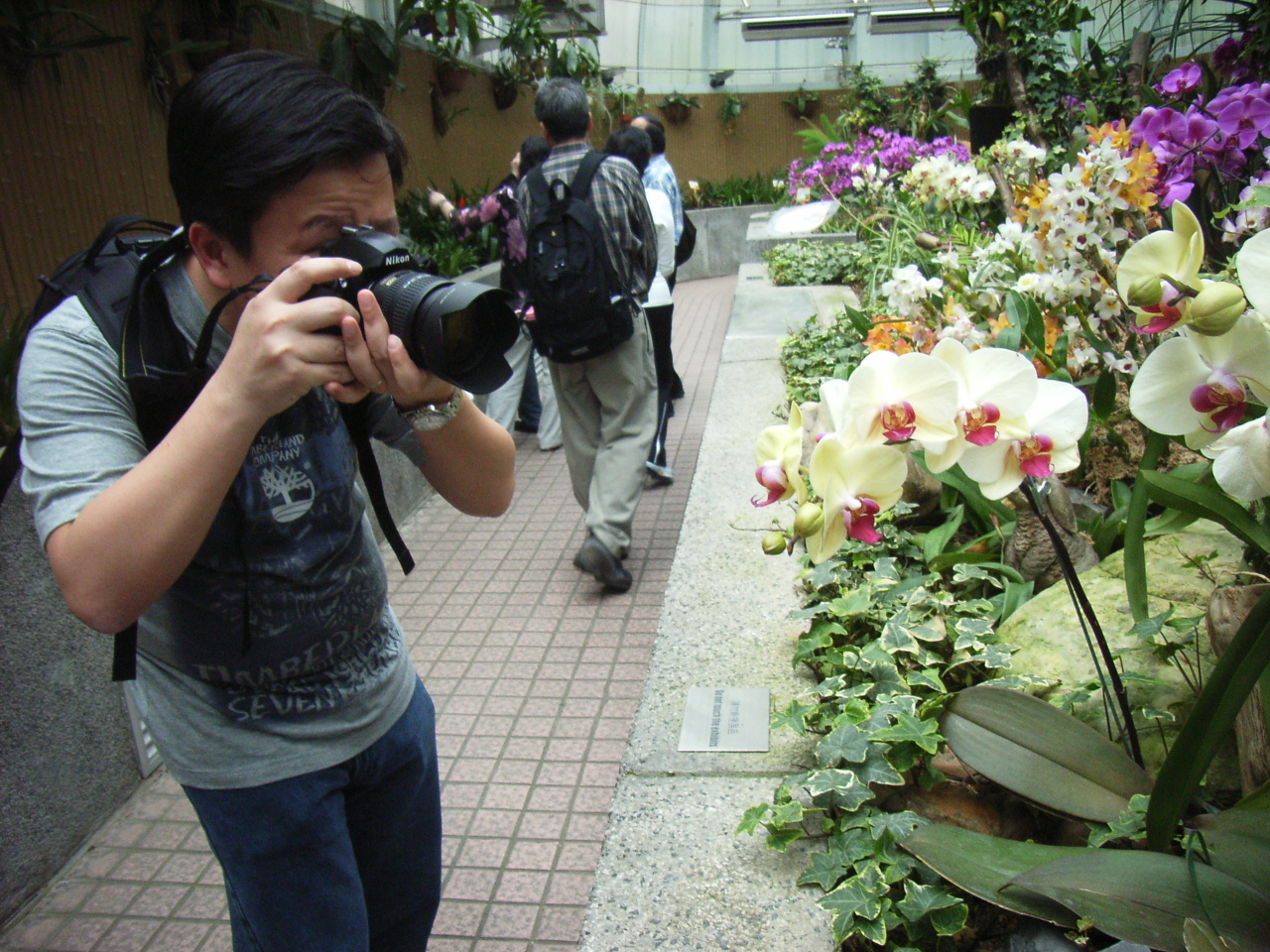
Visitors in the greenhouse

Various species of orchids, ferns, bromeliads, vines and carnivorous plants are grown in the greenhouse.

=== Palm Garden ===
This garden grows over 30 species under 22 genera of the palm family.

=== Bauhinia Garden ===
This garden grows eight species including Hong Kong orchid tree (Bauhinia blakeana), purple camel's foot (Bauhinia purpurea) and camel's foot tree (Bauhinia variegata).

=== Azalea Garden ===
This garden grows over 10 azalea species including red azalea (Rhododendron simsii), lovely azalea (Rhododendron pulchrum), purple azalea (Rhododendron pulchrum var. phoeniceum) and white azalea (Rhododendron mucronatum), those are native to Hong Kong. There are also rare species such as yellow azalea (Rhododendron molle) and Westland's rhododendron (Rhododendron moulmainense).

=== Herb Garden ===
Various species of herb are grown in the garden.

== Animals ==
The size of the garden precludes the keeping of very large mammal species such as giraffes. Nevertheless, the collection of primates is varied, including creatures such as the Hoffmann's two-toed sloth, Red necked wallaby, golden lion tamarin, gibbon, orangutan, ring-tailed lemur and black-and-white ruffed lemur. Apart from the plants, there are over 400 birds, 50 mammals and 20 reptiles.

=== Mammals and reptiles ===
A taxidermy specimen of Siu Fa, the female jaguar that lived in Hong Kong for nearly 20 years is on display at the Education and Exhibition Centre of HKZBG from 5 March 2009.

A pigeon pair of Bornean orangutan twins were born in the HKZBG in July 2011, joining the big family of the gardens. This is the first-ever successful breeding of Bornean orangutan twins in the HKZBG, bringing to five the total number of this primate in the gardens

To enhance public understanding and appreciation of all living creatures, the two female meerkats introduced to the HKZBG are aged 4 and 5, and are housed in the newly-decorated "Meerkat's Home".

In 2020, The mammal and reptile section of the Zoological & Botanical Gardens were temporarily closed due to the COVID-19 epidemic. The mammal families at the gardens expanded during the epidemic.

To celebrate its 150th anniversary in 2021, a female Asian small-clawed otter and red necked wallaby were introduced to the HKZBG.

Yellow-cheeked gibbons, ring-tailed lemurs, white-faced saki, black-and-white ruffed lemurs and cotton-top tamarins all welcomed new additions to the family.

The reptiles are primarily snakes, crocodilians, and turtles such as the African spurred tortoise, radiated tortoise, Chinese alligator and Burmese python.

=== Birds ===
Over 100 avian species have successfully reared young, including the red-crowned crane, peacock pheasant and the Bali mynah, all of which are highly endangered in the wild.

Just outside the greenhouse are several large aviaries housing species of waterfowl, such as the wood duck, flamingo, blue crane and intensely-coloured scarlet ibis, perching atop a man-made waterfall.

There are also terrestrial birds, many of them small, and several species from East Asia and Africa. Yellow-casqued hornbill are among the HKZBG's larger avian species.

An injured black-faced spoonbill was rescued in Nam Sang Wai by staff of the Agriculture, Fisheries and Conservation Department, and transferred to the KFBG Wild Animal Rescue Centre in March 2018. This spoonbill, which was unable to fly after an operation, will be able to join the other waterfowl at HKZBG, and so will have excellent human-provided care as well as companions in captivity.

To celebrate its 150th anniversary this year, the Hong Kong Zoological and Botanical Gardens will hold a number of free public activities, in addition to adding black-crowned cranes, great white pelicans, and great curassow, in addition to bird-watching platforms.

The small brick buildings that house some of the smaller birds were once staff quarters for Chinese workers at the park. These were recently renovated, resulting in the destruction of a row of defunct Victorian gas lamp posts; these may have been the last remaining such lamps in Hong Kong, and possibly in all of East Asia.

=== Animal welfare concerns ===
Bornean orangutan in the Hong Kong Zoological and Botanical Gardens

In 2014, the South China Morning Post reported that the Kadoorie Institute, Society for the Prevention of Cruelty to Animals (SPCA), Animals Asia Foundation, and orangutan foundation Orangutanaid all have expressed "sincere doubts over the welfare of [the gardens'] animals" and recommended that the park return to its origins as a botanical garden. SPCA deputy director Jane Grey criticised the gardens' facilities as being outdated, inadequate, and overcrowded, comparing it to a "menagerie from the turn of the last century". Later that year, renowned primatologist and conservationist Jane Goodall expressed her concern over the gardens' treatment of orangutans in Hong Kong's zoo, saying that they were "not in a good situation" and that "large animals in small cages with nothing to do are not happy animals".

In 2024, 12 monkeys were found dead, reportedly due to melioidosis, a bacterial infection spread through contact with contaminated soil. The monkey deaths included critically endangered cotton-top tamarins as well as white-faced sakis and a De Brazza's monkey.

== Transport ==
The main entrance is located at Upper Albert Road. A number of bus routes give access to the facility. Admission is free to all parts of the Zoological and Botanical Gardens.

== See also ==
- Central and Western Heritage Trail
- King George V Memorial Park, Hong Kong
- List of urban public parks and gardens of Hong Kong
- Edward Youde Aviary
- Ocean Park Hong Kong
- Kadoorie Farm and Botanic Garden
