= Statue of George VI, Hong Kong =

Sculpture by Gilbert Ledward

Statue of George VI
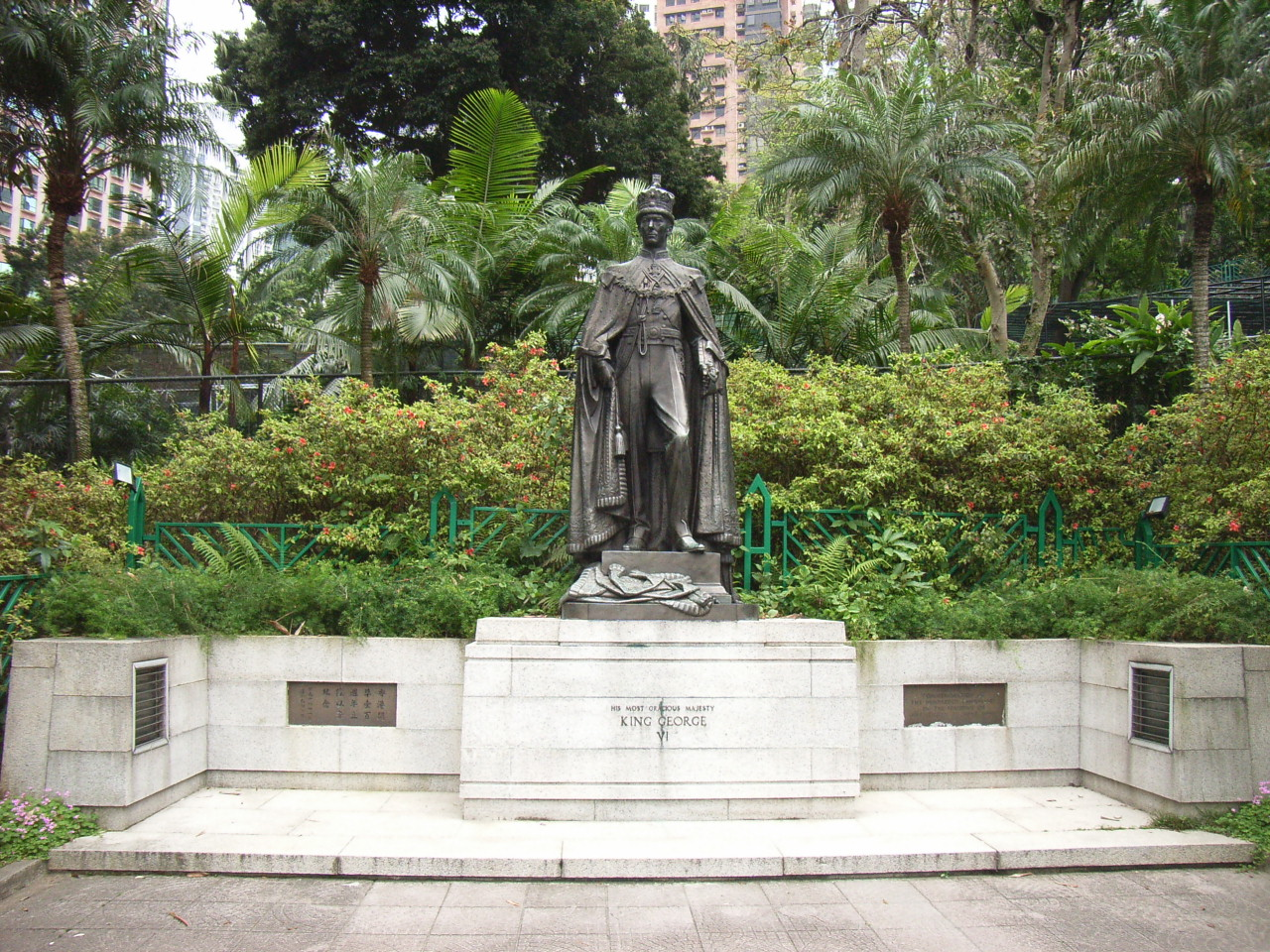
- The statue in 2006
- Artist: Gilbert Ledward
- Medium: Bronze sculpture
- Subject: George VI
- Location: Hong Kong

The statue of George VI is a bronze sculpture by British artist Gilbert Ledward, installed at the Hong Kong Zoological and Botanical Gardens. The statue was erected in 1958 to commemorate Hong Kong's centennial, and replaced one depicting Arthur Kennedy, the 7th Governor of Hong Kong.
