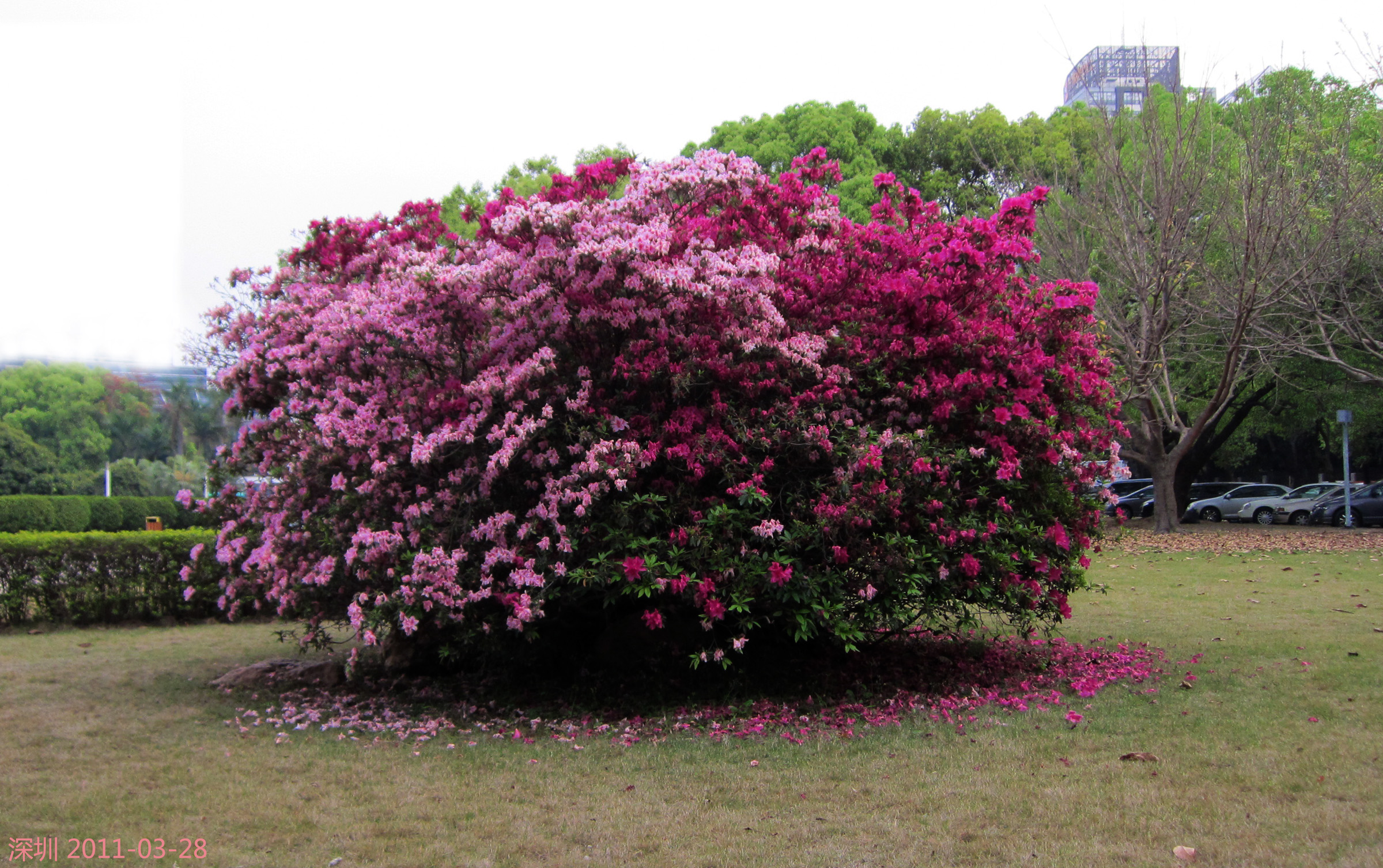

Scientific classification
- Kingdom: Plantae
- Clade: Tracheophytes
- Clade: Angiosperms
- Clade: Eudicots
- Clade: Asterids
- Order: Ericales
- Family: Ericaceae
- Genus: Rhododendron
- Species: R. pulchrum

Binomial name
- Rhododendron pulchrum Sweet

= Rhododendron pulchrum =

Species of plant

Rhododendron pulchrum (锦绣杜鹃), also identified as Rhododendron × pulchrum, is a rhododendron endemic to China. It grows as a semi-evergreen shrub, 1.5–2.5 m (4.9–8.2 ft) in height, with leathery leaf blades, elliptic-oblong to elliptic-lanceolate or oblong-oblanceolate, 2–5(–7) × 1–2.5 cm in size. The flowers are rose-purple with dark red flecks. Hirsutum describes it as "a natural hybrid; seed × pollen= R. mucronatum var mucronatum × R. indicum var formosanum".

== Synonyms ==
- Rhododendron indicum var. pulchrum (Sweet) G. Don
- Rhododendron indicum var. smithii Sweet
- Rhododendron phoeniceum f. smithii (Sweet) E.H. Wilson
