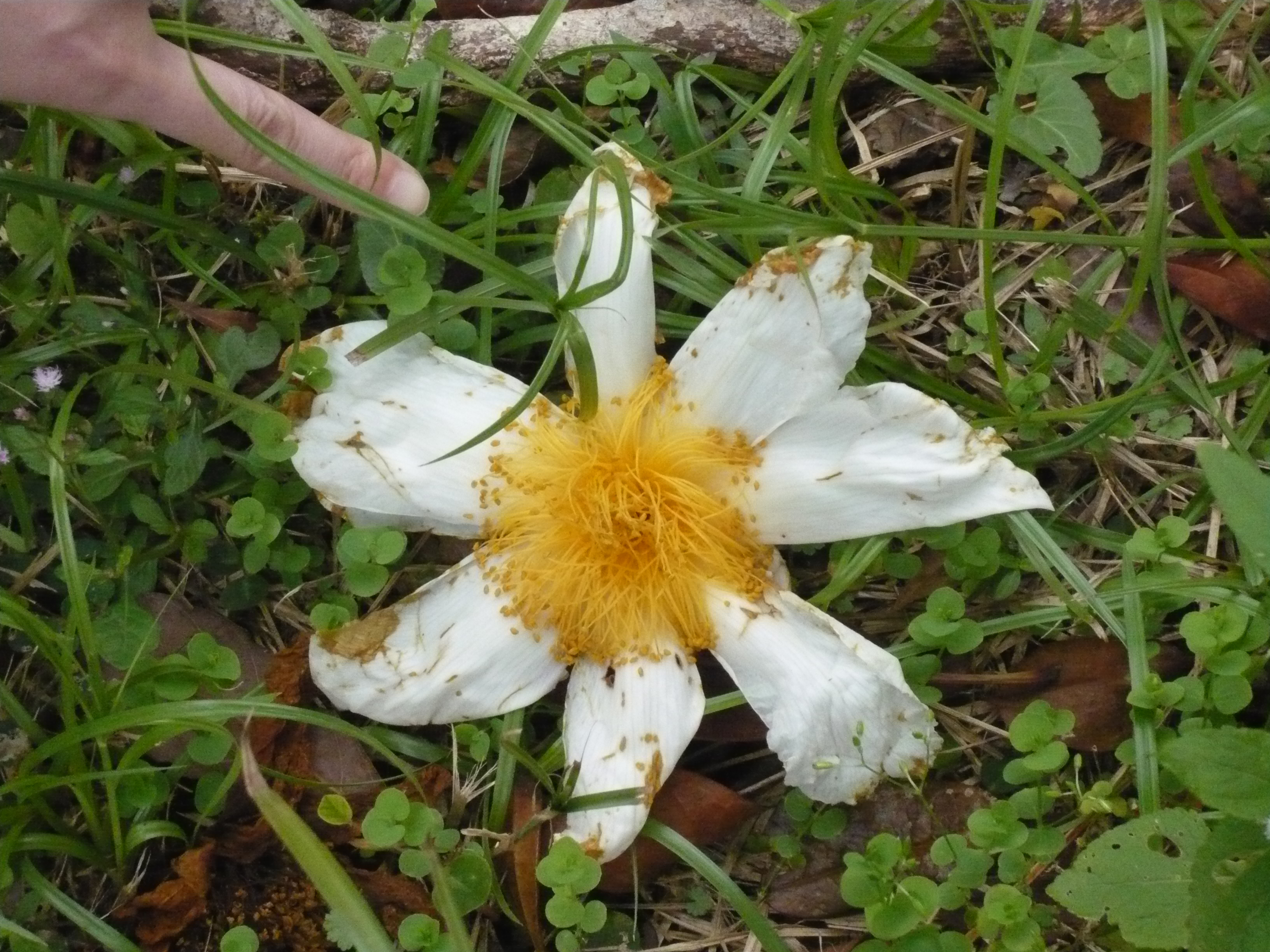

Conservation status
- Vulnerable (IUCN 3.1)

Scientific classification
- Kingdom: Plantae
- Clade: Tracheophytes
- Clade: Angiosperms
- Clade: Eudicots
- Clade: Asterids
- Order: Ericales
- Family: Theaceae
- Genus: Camellia
- Species: C. granthamiana

Binomial name
- Camellia granthamiana J. R. Sealy

= Camellia granthamiana =

Species of tree

Camellia granthamiana (Chinese: 葛量洪茶; Jyutping: got3 loeng4 hung4 caa4; lit. 'Grantham tea'), or Grantham's camellia, is a rare, endangered species of Camellia, which was first discovered in Hong Kong in 1955.

The distribution of the species is limited in both Hong Kong and Mainland China. Only one individual of the species was found at that time when it was discovered. A few more wild populations were found in Ma On Shan and also in Guangdong(including Shenzhen).

It was first discovered in the ravine of Tai Mo Shan in 1955 by AFCD. It was named in honour of the then Governor of Hong Kong, Sir Alexander Grantham.

Tai Mo Shan Montane Scrub Forest in the upper Shing Mun Valley was assigned as a Sites of Special Scientific Interest (SSSI) in 1975 as the forest supports this rare species and other species, Camellia waldenae, Amentotaxus argotaenia and many species of orchids.

In Hong Kong, it is a protected species under Forestry Regulations Cap. 96A, and has been actively propagated and reintroduced to the wild by the Hong Kong Agriculture, Fisheries and Conservation Department. In view of the high conservation value of the species, the Hong Kong Biodiversity Genomics Consortium has sequenced the 2.4 Gb reference genome of the species.

== See also ==
- Hong Kong camellia
