= Western Australia Day =

Public holiday in Western Australia

- Also called: Foundation of the Colony (1833–1876); Foundation Day (1877–2011); WA Day
- Observed by: Western Australia
- Type: State holiday
- Significance: Foundation of Western Australia in 1829
- Date: First Monday in June
- 2025 date: June 2
- 2026 date: June 1
- 2027 date: June 7
- 2028 date: June 5
- Frequency: Annual
- Related to: Australia Day, Norfolk Island Foundation Day

Western Australia Day or simply WA Day (formerly known as Foundation Day) is a public holiday in Western Australia (WA), celebrated on the first Monday in June each year, to commemorate the founding of the Swan River Colony in 1829. Because of the date of the Western Australia Day public holiday, Western Australia does not have the King's Official Birthday public holiday in June, as do most of the other Australian states; it is held in September or October instead.

A bill proposing to shift the date of Western Australia Day from June to the second Monday in November passed in the Parliament of Western Australia in October 2026, with the new date coming into effect in 2028.

== History ==
HMS Challenger, under Captain Charles Fremantle, anchored off Garden Island on 25 April 1829. On 2 May, Fremantle officially claimed for Britain the part of the continent then called New Holland that was not already "included within the territory of New South Wales" which at the time extended to 129th meridian east of Greenwich. The merchant vessel Parmelia – with the new colony's administrator Lieutenant Governor James Stirling, other officials, and civilian settlers on board – arrived on the night of 31 May and sighted the coast on 1 June. It arrived in Cockburn Sound on 2 June, and finally anchored there on 6 June. The warship HMS Sulphur arrived on 8 June, carrying a British Army garrison. The Swan River Colony was officially proclaimed by Stirling on 11 June.

Ships carrying more civilian settlers began arriving in August, and on King George IV's birthday, 12 August, the wife of the captain of Sulphur, Helena Dance, standing in for James Stirling's wife Ellen Stirling, cut down a tree to mark the founding of Perth.

In 1832, Stirling decided that an annual celebration was needed to unite the colony's inhabitants, including settlers and Aboriginal Australians and "masters and servants". He decided that the commemoration would be held on 1 June each year (or if a Sunday, on the following Monday), the date originally planned by Stirling for Parmelia's arrival in recognition of the first and greatest British naval victory over the French in 1794, the "Glorious First of June".

The holiday was celebrated as Foundation Day up until 2011; in 2012, it was renamed Western Australia Day as part of a series of law changes recognising Aboriginal Australians as the original inhabitants of Western Australia.

In November 2024, premier Roger Cook stated he was open to the idea of moving Western Australia Day to a date closer to summer, citing the more favourable climate. His comments came after the 2024 WA Day Festival was cancelled due to poor weather, with the event postponed to 24 November 2024. Subsequent WA Day Festival events in 2025 and 2026 were also held in November instead of June. A 2026 WA Day event in Fremantle was also postponed to October due to poor weather in June.

In 2025, a review of Western Australia's public holidays resulted in the Public and Bank Holidays Amendment Bill 2025, which proposed the addition and shifting of a number of public holidays, including moving Western Australia Day from June to the second Monday in November. The bill started proceeding through Parliament in late 2025, and passed in October 2026. The new date will not come into effect until 2028.
