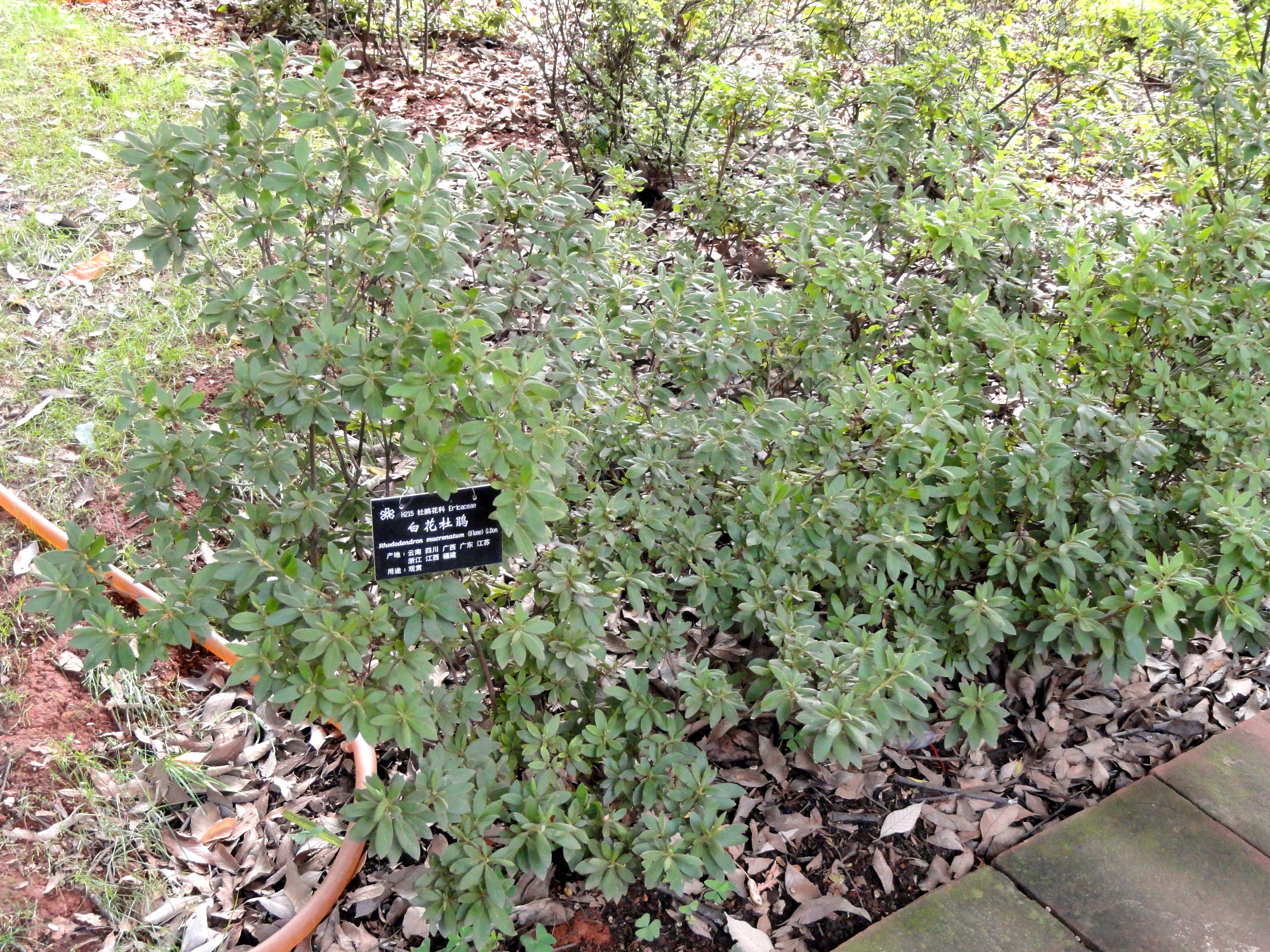

Scientific classification
- Kingdom: Plantae
- Clade: Tracheophytes
- Clade: Angiosperms
- Clade: Eudicots
- Clade: Asterids
- Order: Ericales
- Family: Ericaceae
- Genus: Rhododendron
- Species: R. mucronatum

Binomial name
- Rhododendron mucronatum (Blume) G.Don

Synonyms
- Azalea indica var. alba Lindl.; Rhododendron argyi H.Lév.; Rhododendron ledifolium G.Don; Rhododendron rosmarinifolium (Burm.f.) Dippel

= Rhododendron mucronatum =

Species of plant

Rhododendron mucronatum is a rhododendron species native to China, where it grows at altitudes of 2,800–4,500 m (9,200–14,800 ft). This evergreen shrub grows to 1–2 m (3.3–6.6 ft) in height, with leaves that are lanceolate to ovate-lanceolate or oblong-lanceolate, 2–6 by 0.5–1.8 cm in size. The flowers are white, pink, or pale red.
