= Norfolk Island Foundation Day =

Holiday in Norfolk Island

Foundation Day
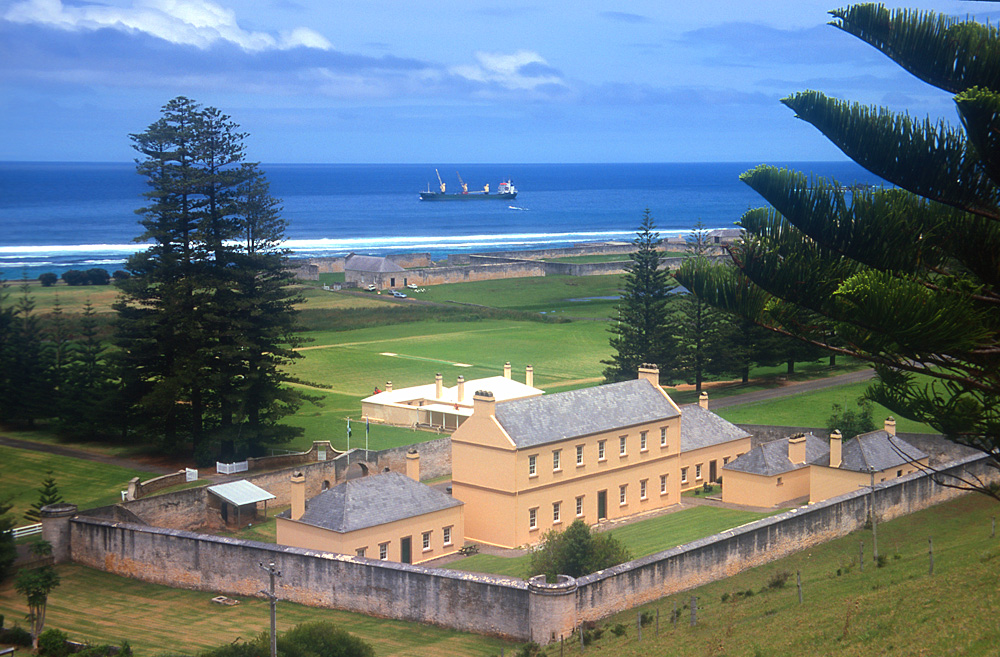
- The Norfolk Island convict settlement today
- Observed by: Norfolk Island
- Type: Local
- Significance: Date of landing of the first European settlers in 1788
- Observances: re-enactment ceremony
- Date: 6 March
- Next time: 6 March 2027
- Frequency: Annual
- Related to: Australia Day, Western Australia Day

Foundation Day is an annual public holiday in Norfolk Island commemorating the arrival of the original British settlers on 6 March 1788.

== Background ==
Because the United States stopped accepting convicts from Britain after gaining independence, Britain needed new penal colonies. London thus commissioned Captain Arthur Phillip to head a group of 11 ships, known as the First Fleet, to do just that and establish a new penal colony in New South Wales.

After the First Fleet's landing in New South Wales, Captain Phillip instructed Lieutenant Philip Gidley King to take a small team of convicts and free men to colonise Norfolk Island. They reached the uninhabited island on 6 March 1788.

== Celebration ==
Each year on Foundation Day, local residents gather at the beach in Kingston and re-enact the arrival of the First Fleeters. They put on costumes to dress up as British sailors and row boats.
