= List of Award of Garden Merit camellias =

As of 2016, a number of camellia cultivars hold the Royal Horticultural Society's Award of Garden Merit. Camellias are popular shrubs of medium to large size (typically 1 to 4 cubic metres (35 to 141 cu ft)), originating in China and the far east. Best seen in a dappled woodland setting, they thrive in acid soil, like other calcifuges such as rhododendrons. They are especially valued for their glossy evergreen foliage and large showy blooms, in shades of red, pink and white. These can appear as early as November in favoured locations in the temperate Northern Hemisphere; but the main flowering season is early to mid spring (February to May). Though the plants are robust, the blooms are easily damaged by frost. It is therefore advisable to site the plants away from direct morning sun.

Below is a list of selected cultivars. Maximum dimensions are shown in metres, after 10–20 years.

== List ==
Name	Species	Colour	Form	Height (metres)	Spread (metres)	Reference	Image
Adelina Patti	japonica	pink	single	2.5	2.5		
Adolphe Audusson	japonica	red	single	8	8		
Akashigata	japonica	rose-pink	semi-double	2.5	2.5		
Alba Plena	japonica	white	double	8	8		
Alexander Hunter	japonica	red	single	4	4		
Annie Wylam	japonica	pink (pale)	double	4	2.5		
Anticipation	× williamsii	rose-pink	double	4	2.5		
Australis	japonica	rose pink	single	4	2.5		
Ballet Dancer	japonica	pale pink/cream	double	4	2.5		
Berenice Boddy	japonica	pale pink	semi-double	4	2.5		
Black Lace	japonica × williamsii	red	double	2.5	2.5		
Bob Hope	japonica	red	semi-double	4	2.5		
Bob's Tinsie	japonica	red	double	2.5	1		
Bowen Bryant	× williamsii	pink	semi-double	4	4		
Brigadoon	× williamsii	rose-pink	semi-double	4	2.5		
Bokuhan	japonica	red	single	1	1		
C.M. Hovey	japonica	rose-pink	double	4	2.5		
Carter's Sunburst	japonica	pale pink	double	4	2.5		
China Clay	× williamsii	white	semi-double	2.5	2.5		
Commander Mulroy	japonica	white	double	2.5	1.5		
Cornish Snow	cuspidata × saluenensis	white	single	2.5	1.5		
Cornish Spring	cuspidata × japonica	pink	single	2.5	1.5		
Crimson King	sasanqua	rose-red	single	2.5	2.5		
Daintiness	× williamsii	salmon pink	semi-double	4	2.5		
Debbie	× williamsii	rose-pink	double	4	4		
Desire	japonica	white/pink	double	4	2.5		
Doctor Clifford Parks	japonica × reticulata	pink	double	8	4		
Doctor Tinsley	japonica	pale pink	semi-double	2.5	2.5		
Donation	× williamsii	pale pink	semi-double	8	8		
Drama Girl	japonica	rose-pink	semi-double	4	2.5		
E.T.R. Carlyon	× williamsii	white	semi-double	4	2.5		
Elegant Beauty	× williamsii	rose-pink	semi-double	4	2.5		
Elsie Jury	× williamsii	rose-pink	double	4	2.5		
Francie L.	reticulata	pink	semi-double	4	4		
Freedom Bell	× williamsii	red	semi-double	2.5	2.5		
George Blandford	× williamsii	deep pink	double	4	4		
Glenn's Orbit	× williamsii	deep pink	semi-double	4	4		
Gloire de Nantes	japonica	rose-pink	semi-double	2.5	2.5		
Grand Prix	japonica	red	semi-double	8	8		
Grand Slam	japonica	red (deep)	double	4	4		
Guilio Nuccio	japonica	rose-pink	double	4	2.5		
Hagoromo	japonica	pale pink	semi-double	4	2.5		
Hakurakuten	japonica	white	semi-double	4	2.5		
Hugh Evans	sasanqua	rose-pink	single	4	2.5		
Inspiration	reticulata × saluenensis	rose pink	semi-double	4	2.5		
J.C. Williams	× williamsii	pink	single	4	4		
Jean May	sasanqua	pale pink	semi-double	2.5	2.5		
Joseph Pfingstl	japonica	red (deep)	semi-double	4	4		
Julia Hamiter	× williamsii	pale pink/white	double	4	4		
Jupiter	japonica	rose-red	single	4	2.5		
Jury's Yellow	× williamsii	white/yellow	semi-double	4	4		
Konronkoku	japonica	red (deep)	double	2.5	2.5		
Lavinia Maggi	japonica	white/pink	double	4	4		
Leonard Messel	reticulata x (x williamsii)	rose-pink	semi-double	4	4		
Les Jury	× williamsii	red	double	2.5	1.5		
Mars	japonica	red (deep)	semi-double	4	4		
Masayoshi	japonica	red/white	semi-double	4	4		
Mercury	japonica	red (deep)	semi-double	2.5	2.5		
Muskoka	× williamsii	deep pink	semi-double	4	4		
Narumigata	sasanqua	white	single	4	2.5		
Nobilissima	japonica	white	double	4	4		
Nuccio's Gem	japonica	white	double	4	4		
Nuccio's Jewel	japonica	pink/white	double	4	2.5		
R.L. Wheeler	japonica	rose-pink	semi-double	4	2.5		
Royalty	japonica × reticulata	red	semi-double	1	1		
Saint Ewe	× williamsii	rose-pink	single	4	4		
San Dimas	japonica	red (deep)	single	4	2.5		
Senorita	× williamsii	pink	double	2.5	2.5		
Show Girl	reticulata × sasanqua	pale pink	semi-double	4	2.5		
Sparkling Burgundy		pink	double	4	2.5		
Spring Festival	cuspidata hybrid	pale pink	double	4	2.5		
Tom Knudsen	japonica × reticulata	red (deep)	double	2.5	2.5		
Sylva	japonica	red (deep)	single	4	2.5		
Tricolor	japonica	white/red	semi-double	4	4		
Water Lily	× williamsii	pink	double	4	2.5		

== See also ==
- Camellia
- Camellia japonica
- Camellia reticulata
- Camellia sasanqua
- Camellia × williamsii
