= Yunnan camellia =

Yunnan camellia is common name for several camellia species, and may refer to:

- Camellia reticulata, native to southwestern China
- Camellia yunnanensis
