= Williams family of Caerhays, Burncoose and Scorrier =

Arms of Williams of Caerhays, Scorrier & Tregullow in Cornwall: Vair, three crescents or.

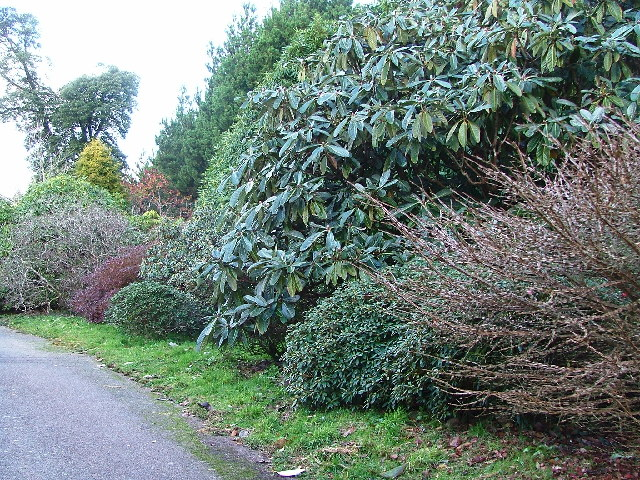
Burncoose Gardens

The Williams family of Caerhays, Burncoose and Scorrier were owners of mines and smelting works for several generations during the Cornish Industrial Revolution. A branch of the family settled in Port Hope, Ontario.

The family developed williamsii hybrid camellias and fine gardens at Burncoose, Gwennap; St Michael Caerhays and Scorrier House, all in Cornwall, United Kingdom.

== Family members ==
- John Williams the First (1685–1761) purchased Burncoose in 1715, married Thomasine Paynter.
- John Williams the Second (1714–1790) initiated the construction of the Great County Adit, which eventually became a 40-mile system of adits, draining over 60 mines.
- Michael Williams (1730–1775), son of John the First married Susanna, daughter of Henry Harris of Cusgarne, Cornwall, by his wife Elizabeth, daughter of William Beauchamp (1670–1729) of Pengreep, Cornwall. He lived at Burncoose and was the father of,
- John Williams the Third (23 September 1753 – 17 April 1841), son of Michael Williams (1730–1775), controlled the Gwennap copperbelt and copper smelting works in Swansea. Also owned tin-smelting works, sulphur mines and quarries. He was a Director of The Cornish Bank. With the Fox family of Falmouth, built the Plymouth breakwater and developed the harbour at Portreath and linked it by the Portreath tramway to his mine at Poldice. Purchased land at Scorrier and built Scorrier House there. Married Catherine Harvey in 1776. Received a dream warning of the assassination of the Prime Minister in 1812, "correct in every detail".
- John Williams the Fourth (12 April 1778 – 11 August 1849), FRS (6 March 1828). Son of John the Third.
- Michael Williams, MP for the Western Division of Cornwall from 1853 to 1858. Son of John the Third. High Sheriff of Glamorgan in 1840, Deputy Lieutenant of Cornwall and Deputy-Warden of the Stannaries. Bought Caerhays Estate in 1853.
- Sir William Williams, (3 August 1791 – 24 March 1870), Son of John the Third. He served as Deputy-Lieutenant of Cornwall, high sheriff of Cornwall and Deputy-Warden of the Stannaries in 1851. He was created "Baronet Williams of Tregullow in the County of Cornwall", on 4 August 1866.
- Frederick Martin Williams (1830–1878), was Conservative Member of Parliament for Truro.
- Philippa Williams ( ? -1861)
- Arthur Trefusis Heneage Williams of Penryn Park, Port Hope, Ontario, son of John Tucker Williams, and grandson of John Williams (1753–1841) of Scorrier House. He was the hero of the Battle of Batoche and his statue stands in front of the town hall at Port Hope. His son General Arthur Victor Seymour Williams served in the Second Boer War, World War I and Mount Williams (Canada) was named in his honour.
- John Michael Williams (25 December 1813 – 16 February 1880), married Elizabeth Maria Davey (d. 24 May 1884), daughter of Stephen Davey of Redruth and Bochym, on 24 February 1852. He was High Sheriff of Cornwall in 1865.
- Michael Williams, eldest son of John Michael Williams (1813–1880) who bequeath for life Gnaton Hall estate, Devon and the rest of his estates in Devon, and all his estates in the town and parish of Calstock.
- John Charles Williams (30 September 1861 – 29 March 1939), second son of John Michael Williams and Elizabeth Davey, his wife. MP for the Truro Division of Cornwall, 1892–1895, High Sheriff of Cornwall 1888, Lord Lieutenant of Cornwall 1918–1936.
- Charlotte Williams, daughter of John Michael Williams, married Edward Powys Rogers. The author Clara Coltman Rogers was a daughter and married into the Vyvyan family and inherited Trelowarren. Her parents moved to "Burncoose" in 1916.
- Harriet Rogers, another daughter of Edward Powys Rogers and Charlotte Rogers, married James Malcolm McLaren (1874–1935), a geologist, and developed a garden at "Tregye", near Carnon Downs.
- Francis Julian Williams (16 April 1927 – 5 January 2019), CBE.
- Charles Henry Williams (born 1957), current owner of Caerhays Castle. Trained as a merchant banker before returning to Cornwall to run Caerhays Castle Gardens and Burncoose Nurseries. Son of Francis Julian Williams.

== Caerhays Castle ==
Caerhays Castle is a country house on the south coast of Cornwall at St Michael Caerhays, between Truro and St Austell. It was designed as a mock-mediaeval castle in the early 19th century by John Nash, and later bought by the Williams family, who still own it. The gardens are open to the public each year in spring and early summer, and hold magnolia trees accredited with Plant Heritage as a National Plant Collection.

== Scorrier House ==
Scorrier House was built by John Williams the Third in 1778 as the principle residence of the Williams family, who still live there. Enlargements were made in 1845 and 1908 following a fire that gutted parts of the house. The garden is also of note, much of it having been planted by William Lobb, a noted Victorian botanist and plant hunter. Today, Scorrier House can be hired for wedding receptions, private parties and corporate and outdoor events. The garden can be visited by appointment only.

== See also ==
- Great Cornish Families

== Notes, references and sources ==
=== Sources ===
- Williams, F. J., et al. Burncoose gardens: a garden oasis in the Minewastes of Cornwall by F. J. Williams C.B.E., Arnold Dance, David Knuckey.
- Smelt, Maurice (2006) 101 Cornish Lives, Penzance, Cornwall: Alison Hodge ISBN 978-0-906720-50-9, pages 246–248: "John Williams (1753–1841), Mining magnate, born Lower Cusgarne, Gwennap".
- Newell, Edmund (2004) 'Williams, John (1753–1841)’, Oxford Dictionary of National Biography, Oxford University Press, Sept 2004; online edn, May 2006 Link to Article (Subscription) accessed 27 July 2007]
