= Scorrier House =

Country house in Cornwall with a stud farm

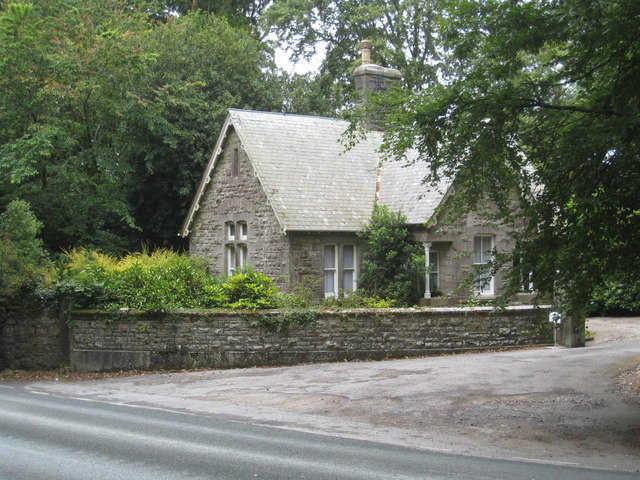
The lodge

Scorrier House, located near the village of Scorrier, Cornwall, England, UK, is a country house and the seat of the Williams family. Scorrier House is also home to an important Cornish garden, Scorrier House Stud and, more recently, the Great Estate Festival

== History ==
Scorrier House was built in 1778 (248 years ago) by John Williams the 3rd (1753–1841), the first son of Michael Williams the 1st (1730–1775) and Susanna Harris (died 1814). John Williams was described in 1868 as "one of the most extensive and most successful managers of mines, as well as adventurers, the county ever produced". He pioneered many industry innovations, including the construction of the Great County Adit and the Portreath Tramway which was the first such railway of its time and now forms the Portreath – Devoran Coast to Coast Mineral Tramway Trail.

=== Enlargements and fire ===
After Michael Williams, John's second son, made a fortune from speculating on the price of tin in 1845, he significantly enlarged Scorrier House, building the stately east façade overlooking the park. Parts of this enlargement were gutted during a fire in 1908, but it was rebuilt in that same year with the introduction of much teak and concrete as further precautions against fire.

=== Mining and geology ===
Through his interest in mining and geology, John Williams amassed a famous mineral collection at Scorrier House. The Scorrier House mineral collection has been described by authors and travellers as one of the most important collections of Cornish minerals ever assembled, and the most valuable variety of mineral specimens of any house in Europe. Among the collection's admirers who visited Scorrier House were two princes who afterwards became Louis XVIII and Charles X, Kings of France. Today the collection is on display at Caerhays Castle and at the Natural History Museum, London.

=== The Scorrier House Penny ===
During a national currency shortage in the early 19th century, John Williams took the initiative to pay workers in his own Cornish currency mined from his own mines. The Scorrier House Penny was issued in 1811 and 1812 and bore the quotation, "PAYABLE IN CASH NOTES AT SCORRIER HOUSE". Many of the 'tokens' are now on display at the Royal Cornwall Museum.

=== Gardens ===
The gardens at Scorrier House are notable, particularly due to the influence of William Lobb, a famous Victorian nurseryman, botanist and plant hunter, who worked for the Williams family. Lobb repeatedly ventured to the Americas on botanical expeditions and introduced many new exotic species to the United Kingdom. As a result, the gardens of Scorrier House contain many unique species, including Britain's tallest monkey-puzzle tree.

== Present day ==
Scorrier House is licensed for civil ceremonies and can be hired for wedding receptions, private parties and corporate events. The staterooms of the house can accommodate 160 people in total and up to 110 people can be seated in one room for a meal.

=== Stud Farm ===
Scorrier House Stud, run by the current occupant of Scorrier House, Richard Williams, specialises in thoroughbreds for flat racing. Many successful horses have been bred at the stud, including Firebreak, the 2004 winner of the Group One Cathay Pacific Hong Kong Mile at Sha Tin and two times winner of the Group 2 Godolphin Mile.

=== Gardens ===
The gardens are now open to the public by appointment. Within the gardens are also Cornish crosses, an extensive camellia wall, a folly dairy and a quartz grotto garden. The garden is open to the public only by appointment.

There are two Cornish crosses here: the original site of the first cross is unknown; on the front of it is a curious representation of Christ with his right hand raised and on the back a Latin cross. The other cross originally stood at Rame in the parish of Wendron; the shaft is ornamented on all four sides.

=== The Great Estate Festival ===
Scorrier House hosted the first Great Estate Festival in June 2017. Branded as a rambunctious fete, the debut Great Estate Festival attracted over 13,000 people. Headliners included Echo & the Bunnymen and Craig Charles.

The second Great Estate Festival in 2018 was attended by nearly 19,000 people and headliners included The Charlatans (English band) and Symphonica featuring Mr Switch.

In 2022, the festival was headlined by the Manic Street Preachers, and well known DJ Yoda also played.

Other music events are hosted at Scorrier House throughout the year.
