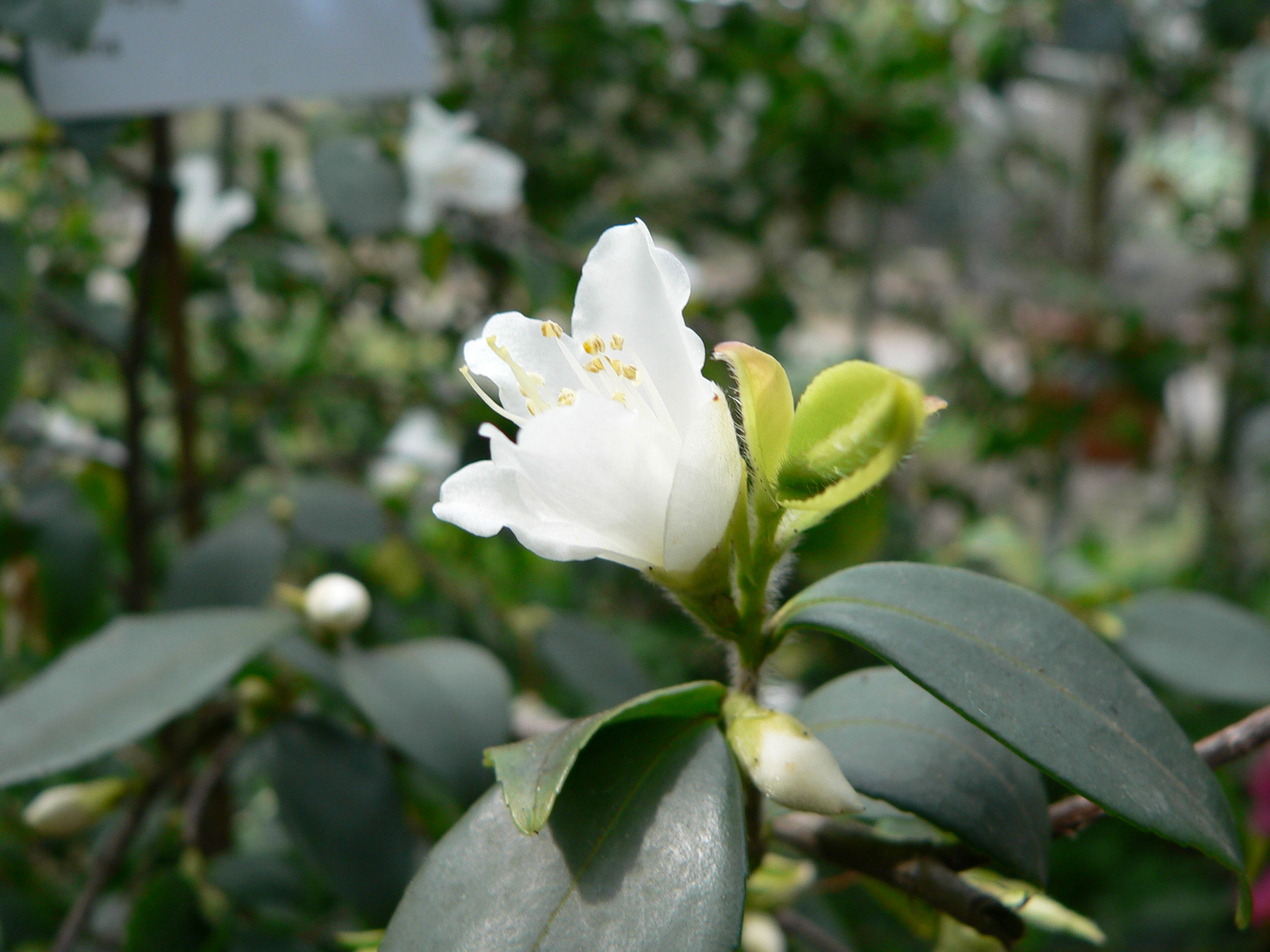
- Flower
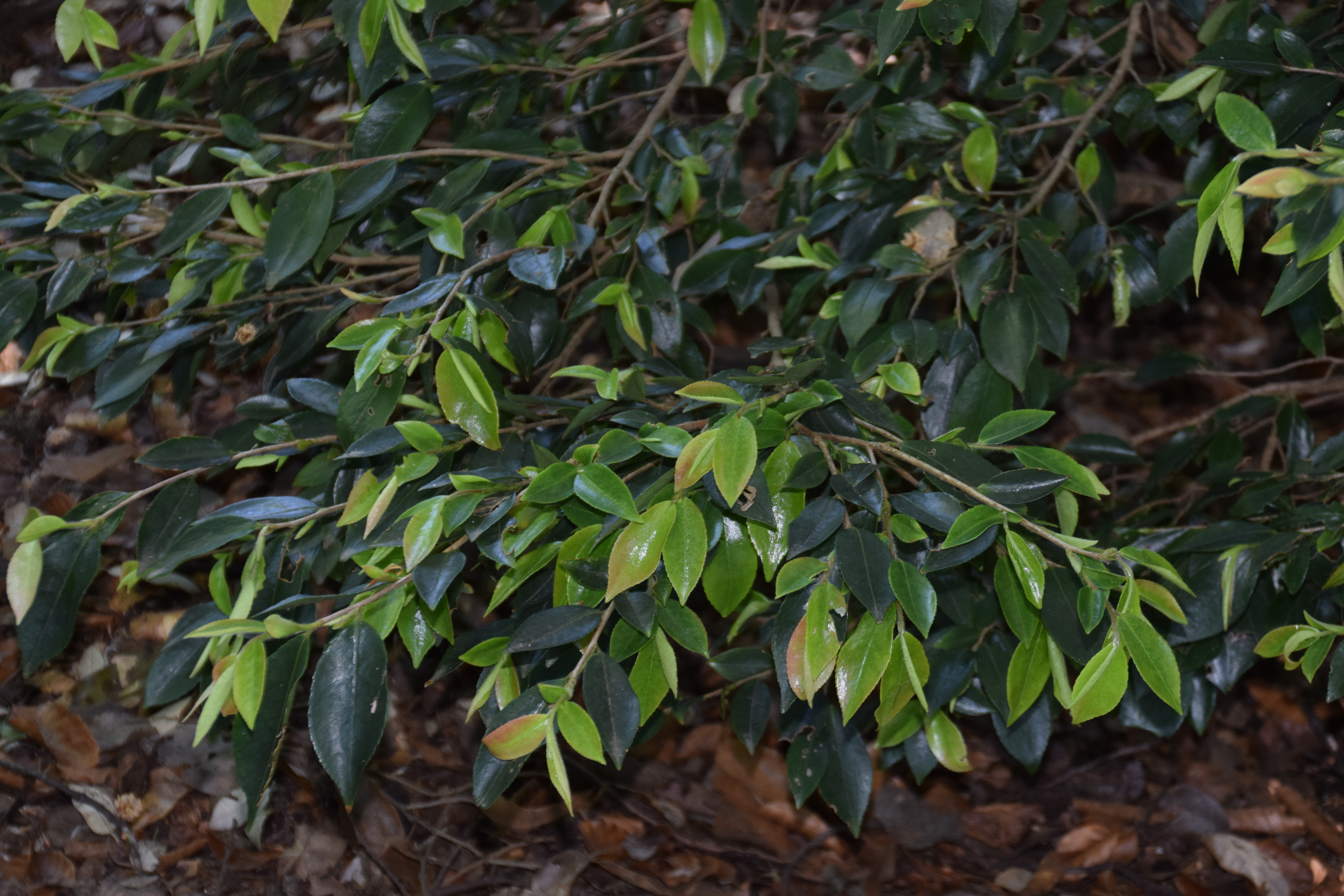
- Young and old leaves

Conservation status
- Least Concern (IUCN 3.1)

Scientific classification
- Kingdom: Plantae
- Clade: Tracheophytes
- Clade: Angiosperms
- Clade: Eudicots
- Clade: Asterids
- Order: Ericales
- Family: Theaceae
- Genus: Camellia
- Species: C. fraterna

Binomial name
- Camellia fraterna Hance

Synonyms
- Camellia fraterna f. amoena D.H.Wu, X.D.Mei & Z.H.Chen; Thea fraterna (Hance) Kuntze; Thea rosiflora var. pilosa Kochs; Theopsis fraterna (Hance) Nakai

= Camellia fraterna =

Species of plant

Camellia fraterna is a species of flowering plant in the tea family Theaceae, native to southeastern China. A perennial shrub from 1 to 4 m (3 to 13 ft) tall, it is typically found in thickets and forests at elevations of 100 to 1,100 m (300 to 3,600 ft). It has been crossed with other members of Camellia to produce a number of hybrid cultivars, including 'Tiny Princess' with Camellia cuspidata.

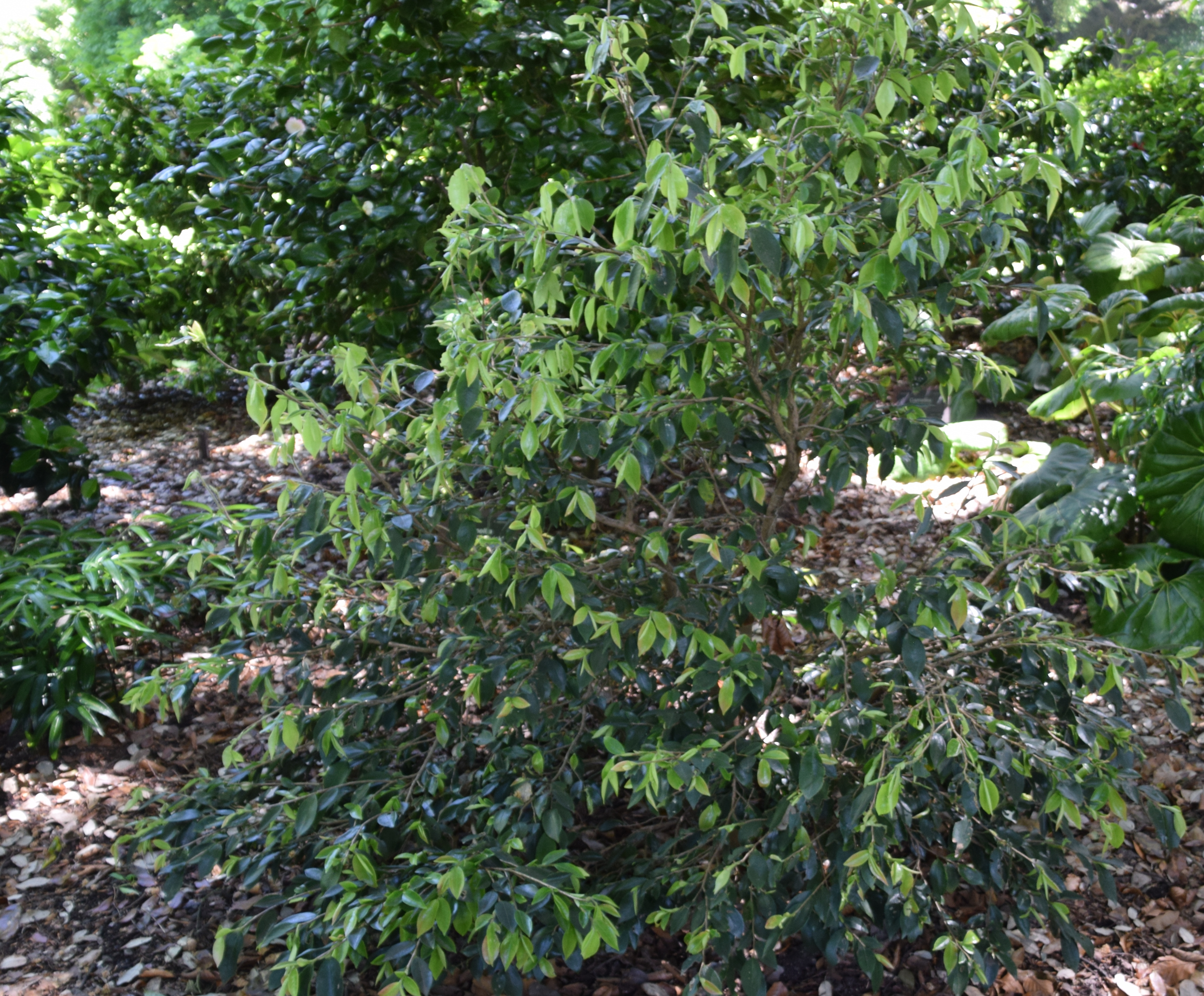
Habit
