= Dinar =

Monetary currency unit of some countries

Nations in dark green currently use a currency known as the dinar. Nations in light green previously used a dinar. States of former Yugoslavia appear in the inset to the lower left.

The dinar (/dɪˈnɑːr/, /ˈdiːnɑː(r)/) is the name of the principal currency unit in several countries near the Mediterranean Sea, with a more widespread historical use. The English word "dinar" is the transliteration of the Arabic دينار (dīnār), which was possibly borrowed via the Syriac dīnarā from the Latin dēnārius.

The modern gold dinar is a projected bullion gold coin, and as of 2019 is not issued as an official currency by any state.

== History ==
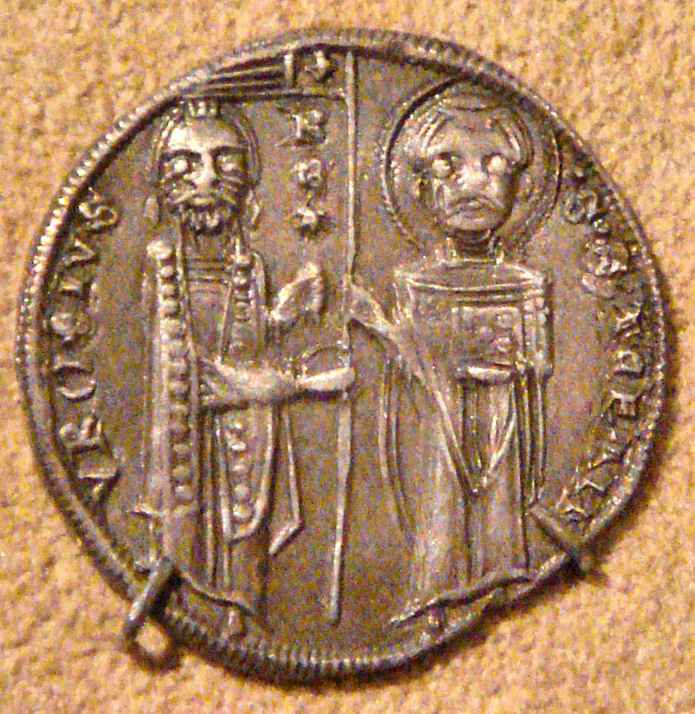
Silver dinar from the reign of Serbian king Stefan Uroš I (1243–1255).

The modern dinar's historical antecedents are the Eastern Roman silver denarius (Greek δηνάριο - "dinario"), and the gold dinar and silver dirham, the main coin of the medieval Islamic empires, first issued in AH 77 (696–697 AD) (Late Antiquity) by Ummayad Caliph Abd al-Malik ibn Marwan. The word "dinar" derives from the Latin word "dēnārius," a silver coin of ancient Rome, which was first minted c. 211 BC.

The Kushan Empire introduced a gold coin known as the dīnāra in India in the 1st century AD; the Gupta Empire and its successors up to the 6th century adopted the coin.

The 8th-century English king Offa of Mercia minted imitations of Abbasid dinars struck in 774 by Caliph al-Mansur with "Offa Rex" centred on the reverse. The moneyer likely had no understanding of Arabic as the Arabic text contains many errors. Such coins may have been produced for trade with Islamic Spain. These coins are called a Mancus, which is also derived from the Arabic language.

== Legal tender ==
=== Countries with current usage ===
Countries currently using a currency called "dinar" or similar:

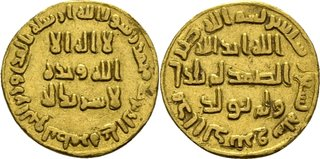
Umayyad Caliphate golden dinar.

Countries	Currency	ISO 4217 code
Algeria	Algerian dinar	DZD
Bahrain	Bahraini dinar	BHD
Iraq	Iraqi dinar	IQD
Jordan	Jordanian dinar	JOD
Kuwait	Kuwaiti dinar	KWD
Libya	Libyan dinar	LYD
North Macedonia	Macedonian denar	MKD; MKN (1992−1993)
Serbia	Serbian dinar	RSD; CSD (2003–2006)
Tunisia	Tunisian dinar	TND

==== As a subunit ====
- 1/100 of the Iranian rial, although functionally obsolete due to inflation. Coins in the subunit were last minted in 1979.

==== Non-circulating ====
- Arab Accounting Dinar used by the Arab Monetary Fund

=== Countries with former usage in the 20th century ===
Countries and regions which have previously used a currency called "dinar" in the 20th century:

Countries	Currency	ISO 4217 code	Used	Replaced by
Abu Dhabi	Bahraini dinar	BHD	1966–1973	United Arab Emirates Dirham
Republic of Bosnia and Herzegovina	Bosnia and Herzegovina dinar	BAD	1992–1998	Bosnia and Herzegovina convertible mark
Croatia	Croatian dinar	HRD	1991–1994	Croatian kuna
Imperial Iran	Iranian Rial subunit	IRR	1931–1979	Subunit obsolete
South Yemen	Yemeni dinar	YDD	1965–1990	Yemeni rial
Yemen	Yemeni dinar	YDD	1990–1996	Yemeni rial
Sudan	Sudanese dinar	SDD	1992–2007	Sudanese pound
Kingdom of Yugoslavia SFR Yugoslavia	Yugoslav dinar	YUF (1945–1965); YUD (1965–1989); YUN (1990–1992)	1918–1992	Bosnia and Herzegovina dinar (Republika Srpska dinar), Croatian dinar (Krajina dinar), Macedonian denar, Slovenian tolar, Yugoslav dinar in Serbia and Montenegro
FR Yugoslavia	Yugoslav dinar in Serbia and Montenegro	YUR (1992–1993); YUO (1993); YUG (1994); YUM (1994–2003)	1992–2003	Serbian dinar, Montenegro and the Deutsche Mark, Kosovo and the Deutsche Mark

=== Countries with historical usage before the 20th century ===
Historical countries and empires which used a currency or coin called "dinar" prior to the 20th century:

Countries	Currency	Used	Replaced by
Cornwall	Cornish Dynar	900– 960	English Penny
Ummayad Caliphate	Ummayad Dinar	680– 750	Abbasid Dinar
Abbasid Caliphate	Abbasid Dinar	750– 1258	Mamluk Dinar
Mamluk Sultanate	Mamluk Dinar	1250– 1517	Ottoman Akçe

== See also ==
- Economy of the Organisation of Islamic Cooperation
- Kelantanese dinar
- Islamic State dinar
- List of circulating currencies
- Middle East economic integration
