= Williams baronets of Tregullow (1866) =

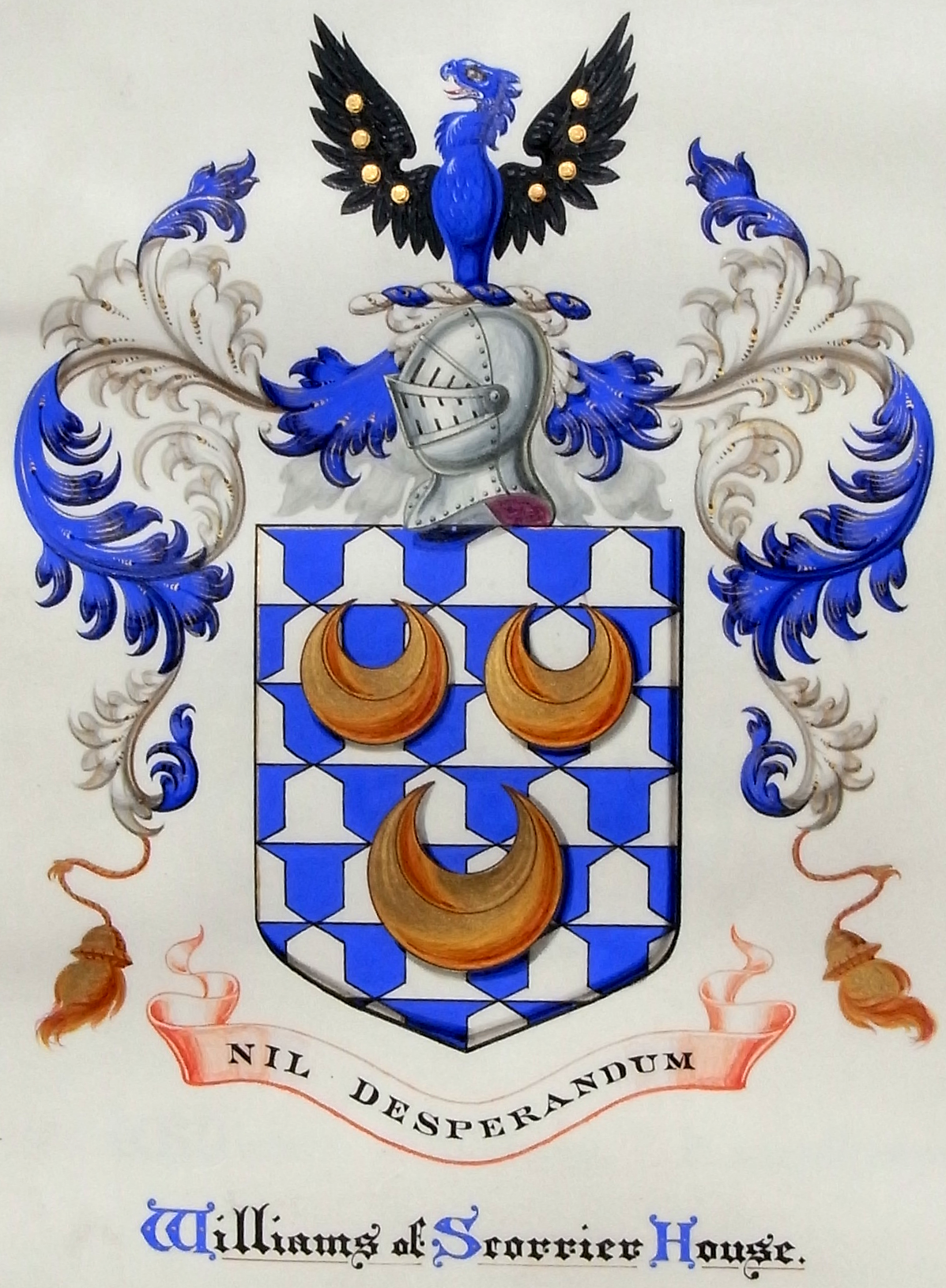
Arms of Williams of Caerhays, Scorrier & Tregullow in Cornwall and of Upcott House in Devon: Vair, three crescents or

The Williams baronetcy, of Tregullow in the County of Cornwall, was created in the Baronetage of the United Kingdom on 4 August 1866 for William Williams, a younger son of the Williams family of Caerhays and Burncoose, a Cornish mining family. He served as High Sheriff of Cornwall. The 2nd Baronet was Conservative Member of Parliament for Truro from 1865 to 1878.

== Williams baronets, of Tregullow (1866) ==
- Sir William Williams, 1st Baronet (1791–1870)
- Sir Frederick Martin Williams, 2nd Baronet (1830–1878)
- Sir William Robert Williams, 3rd Baronet (1860–1903)
- Sir William Frederick Williams, 4th Baronet (1886–1905)
- Sir Frederick William Williams, 5th Baronet (1888–1913)
- Sir Burton Robert Williams, 6th Baronet (1889–1917)
- Sir Frederick Law Williams, 7th Baronet (1862–1921)
- Sir William Law Williams, 8th Baronet (1907–1960)
- Sir Robert Ernest Williams, 9th Baronet (1924–1976)
- Sir Donald Mark Williams, 10th Baronet (born 1954)

The heir presumptive is the present holder's brother Barton Matthew Williams (born 1956).
