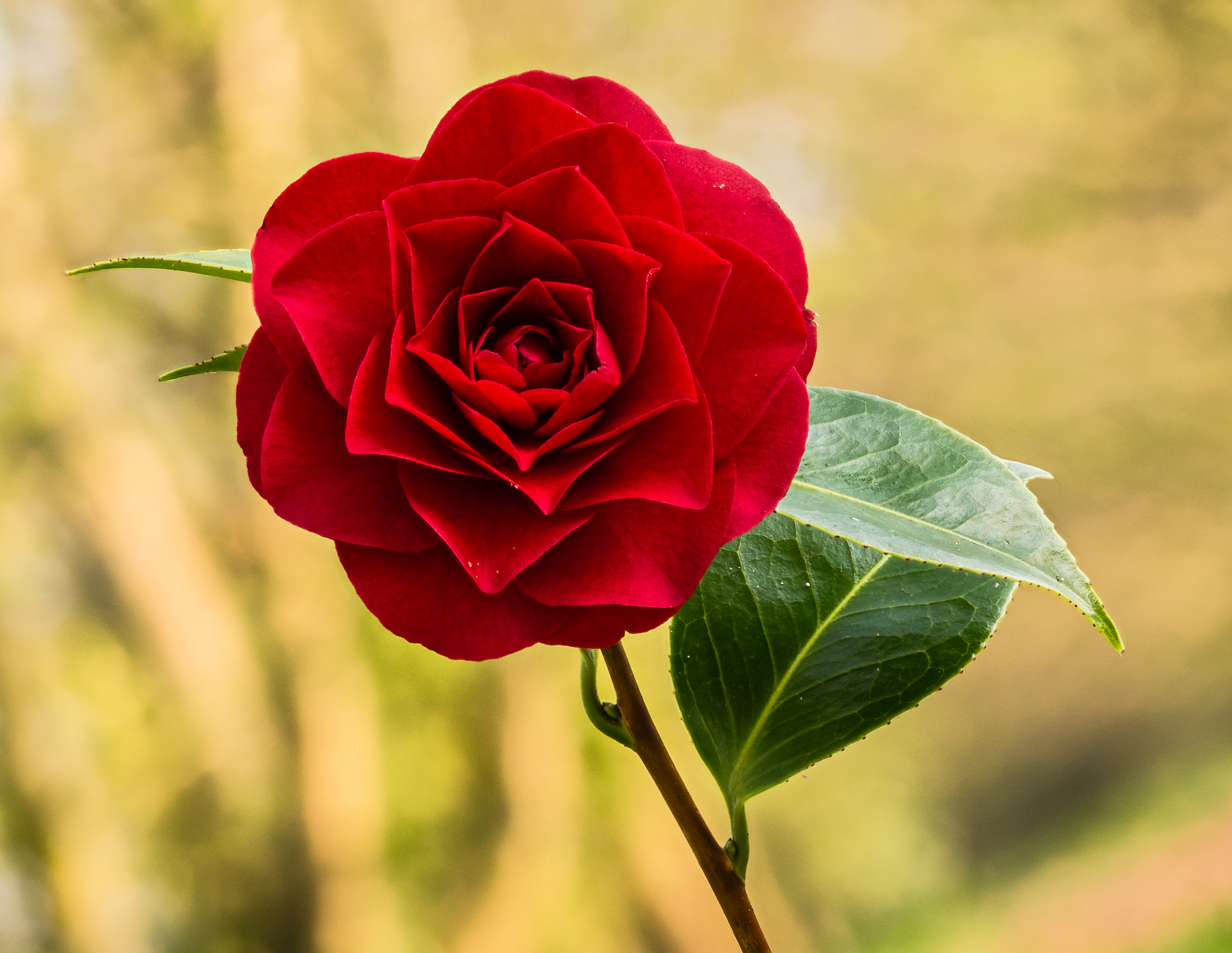
- Camellia × williamsii 'Roger Hall'

Scientific classification
- Kingdom: Plantae
- Clade: Tracheophytes
- Clade: Angiosperms
- Clade: Eudicots
- Clade: Asterids
- Order: Ericales
- Family: Theaceae
- Genus: Camellia
- Species: C. × williamsii

Binomial name
- Camellia × williamsii W.W.Sm.

= Camellia × williamsii =

Hybrid plant

Camellia × williamsii is a cultivar group of hybrid evergreen shrubs that are derived from a crossing of Camellia saluenensis with Camellia japonica. It was originally bred in 1923 at Caerhays Castle in Cornwall by John Charles Williams.

== Cultivars ==
Williamsii cross camellias are hardier than most, and will grow outside anywhere in the UK. Some varieties are known to perform better in colder climates than in warmer ones. 'E.G. Waterhouse', for instance, grows better in Melbourne than it does in Sydney, where it was bred. Hybrid vigour has made the group unusually floriferous, with such varieties as 'St Ewe' flowering for four to five months (December to April in the UK). Some crosses show the elliptical and pointed leaves of C. saluenensis, others the more rounded leaves of C. japonica. Some crosses introduced colours new to camellias: 'Donation' is said to be Tyrian rose, 'Lady Gowrie' fuchsine pink. Nearly all crosses have flowers with translucent petals.

More than 100 named cultivars have been bred.

=== AGM cultivars ===
The following cultivars have gained the Royal Horticultural Society's Award of Garden Merit.

Name	Flower colour	Height (m)	Spread (m)	Ref.
Anticipation	rose-pink	4.0	2.5	
Bowen Bryant	pink	4.0	4.0	
Brigadoon	pink	4.0	2.5	
China Clay	white	2.5	2.5	
Clarrie Fawcett	pale pink	4.0	4.0	
Daintiness	salmon pink	4.0	2.5	
Debbie	rose pink	4.0	4.0	
Donation	pink	8.0	8.0	
E.T.R. Carlyon	white	4.0	2.5	
Elegant Beauty	rose pink	4.0	2.5	
Elsie Jury	rose pink	4.0	2.5	
George Blandford	pink	4.0	4.0	
Glenn's Orbit	deep pink	4.0	4.0	
J.C. Williams	pale pink	4.0	4.0	
Joan Trehane	pink (light)	4.0	4.0	
Julia Hamiter	pink/white	4.0	4.0	
Jury's Yellow	white/yellow	4.0	4.0	
Les Jury	crimson	2.5	1.5	
Muskoka	pink/red	4.0	4.0	
Ruby Wedding	red	2.5	2.5	
Saint Ewe	rose pink	4-0	4.0	
Señorita	pink	2.5	2.5	
Water Lily	rose pink	4.0	2.5	

== Gallery ==
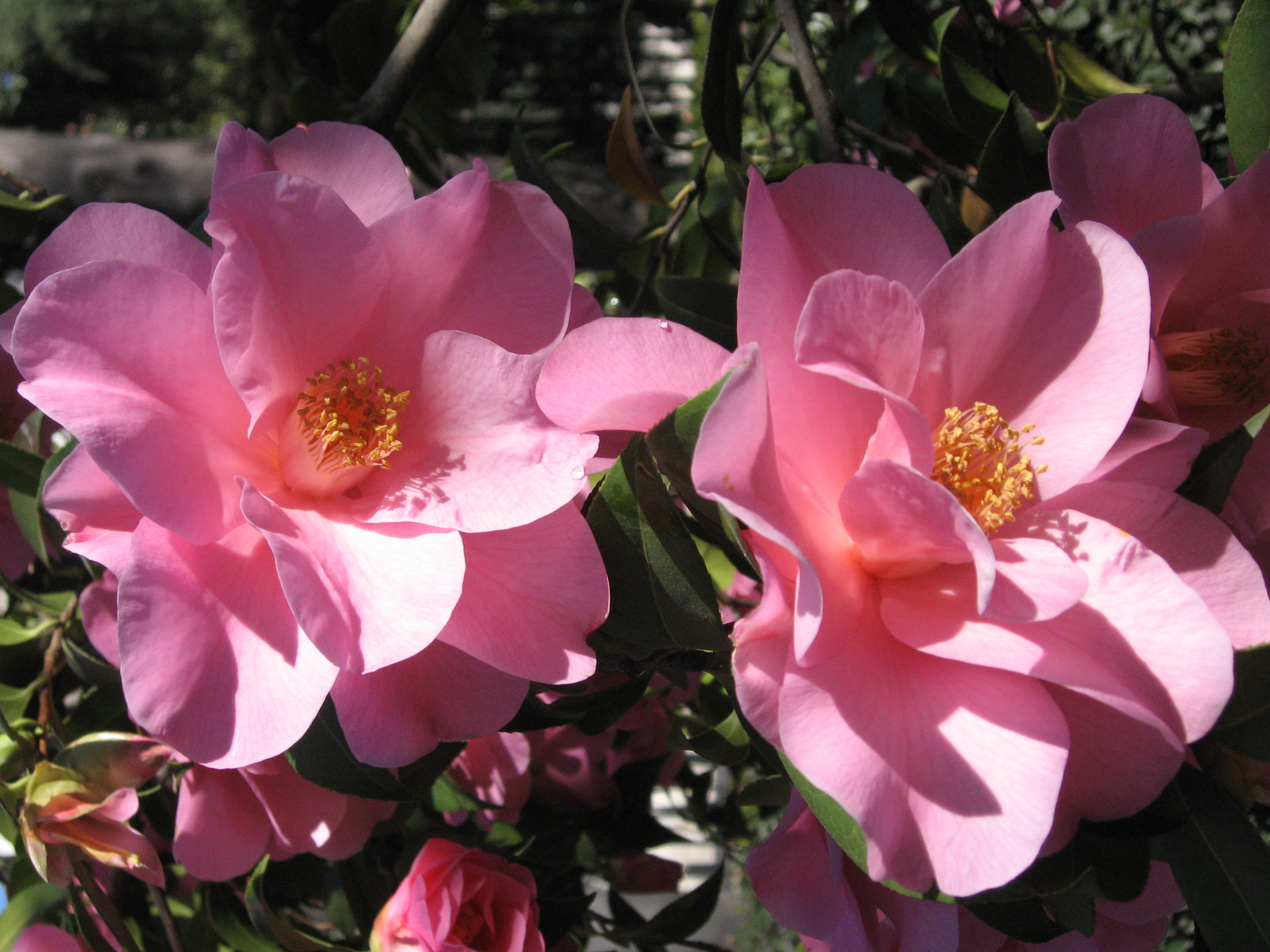
'Brigadoon'

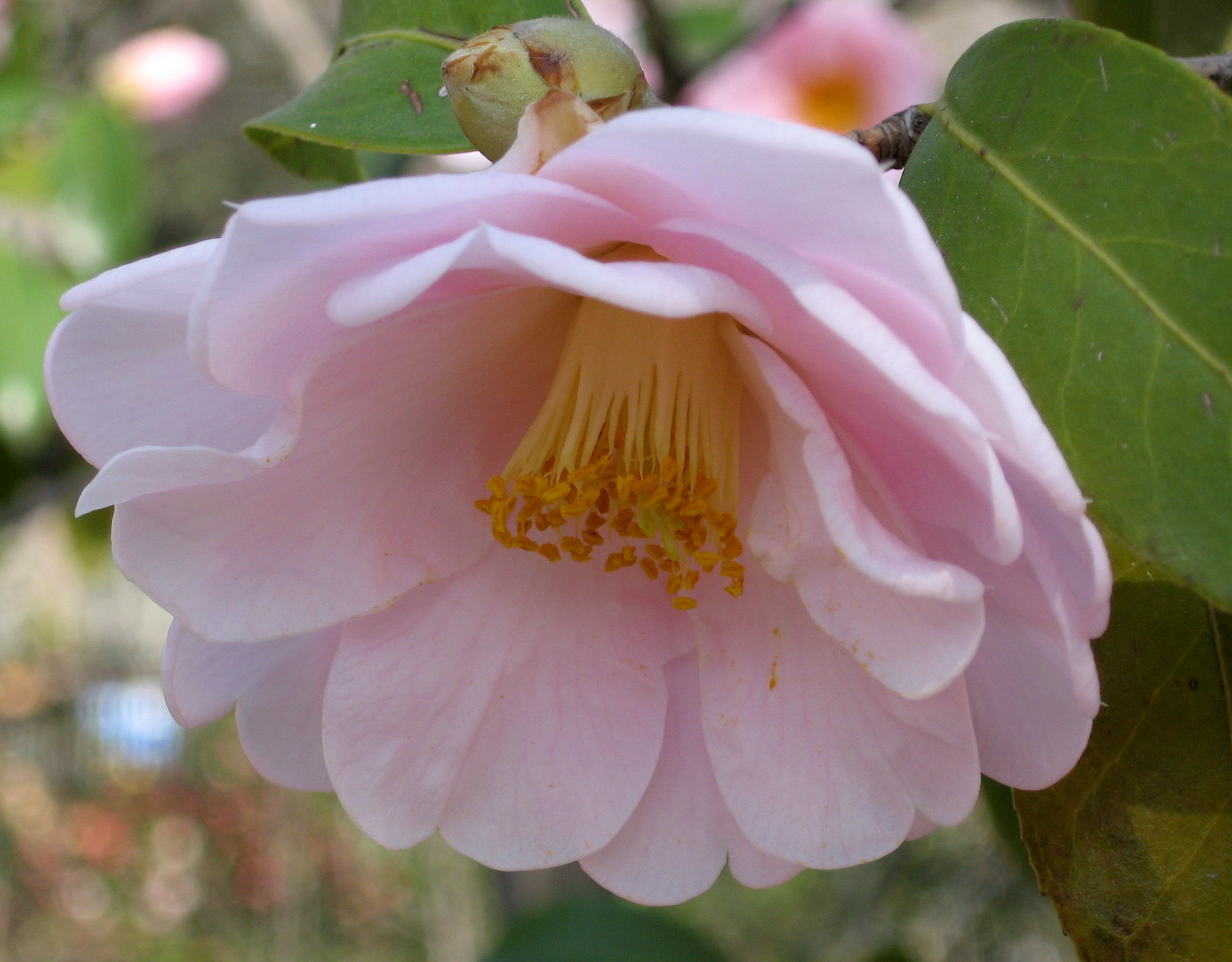
'Citation'

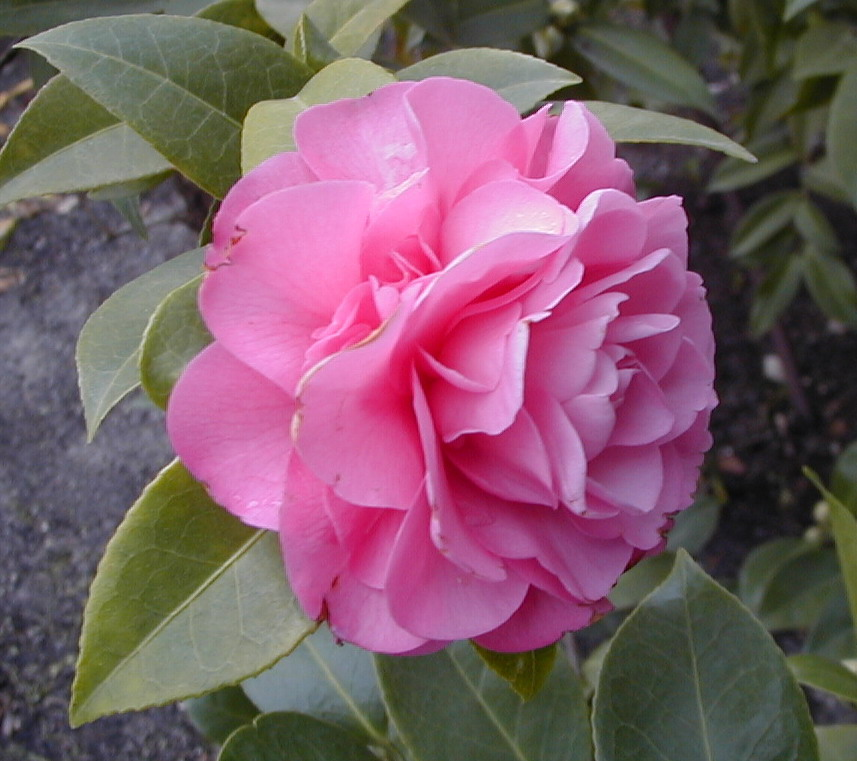
'Debbie'

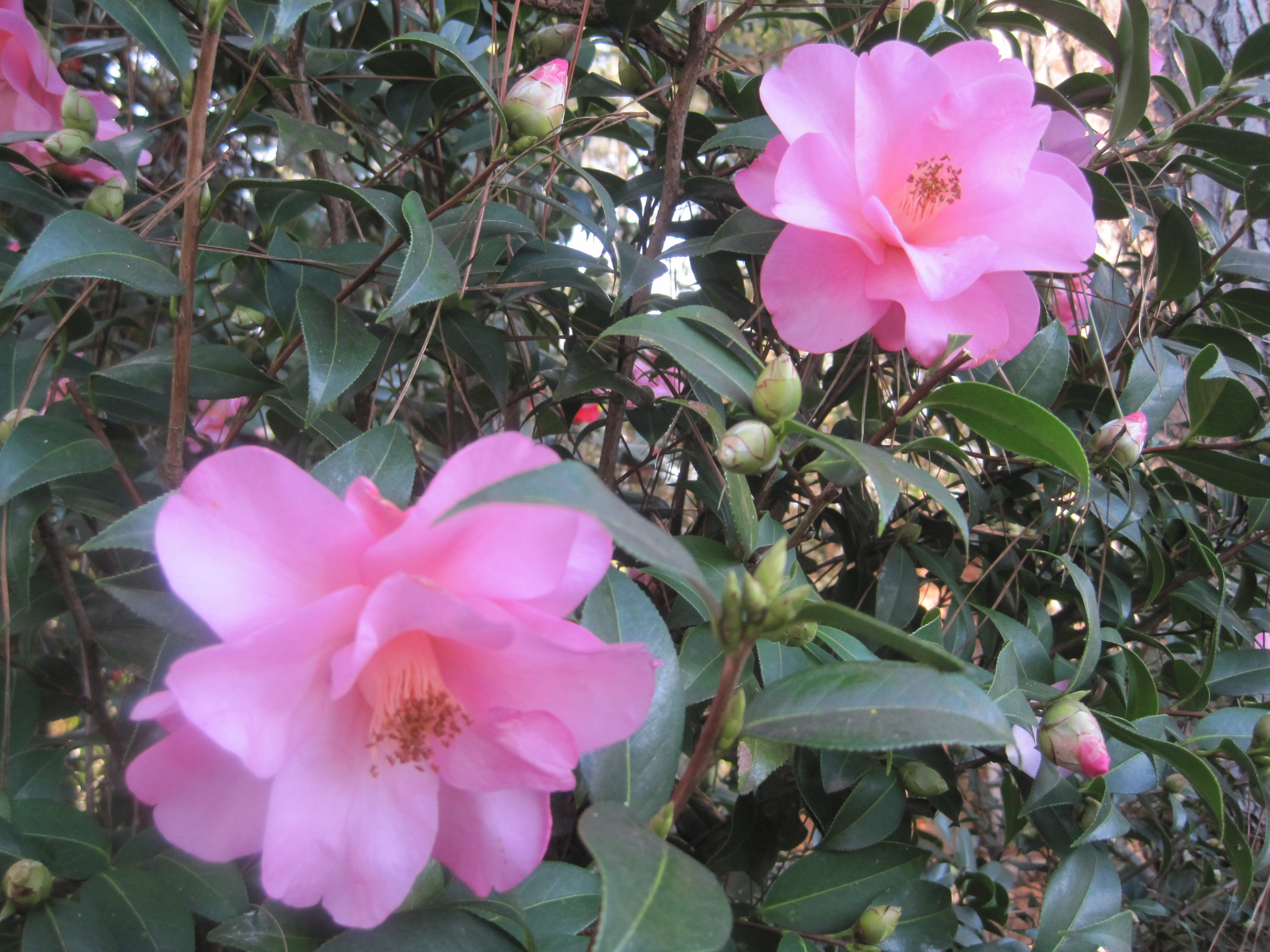
'Daintiness'

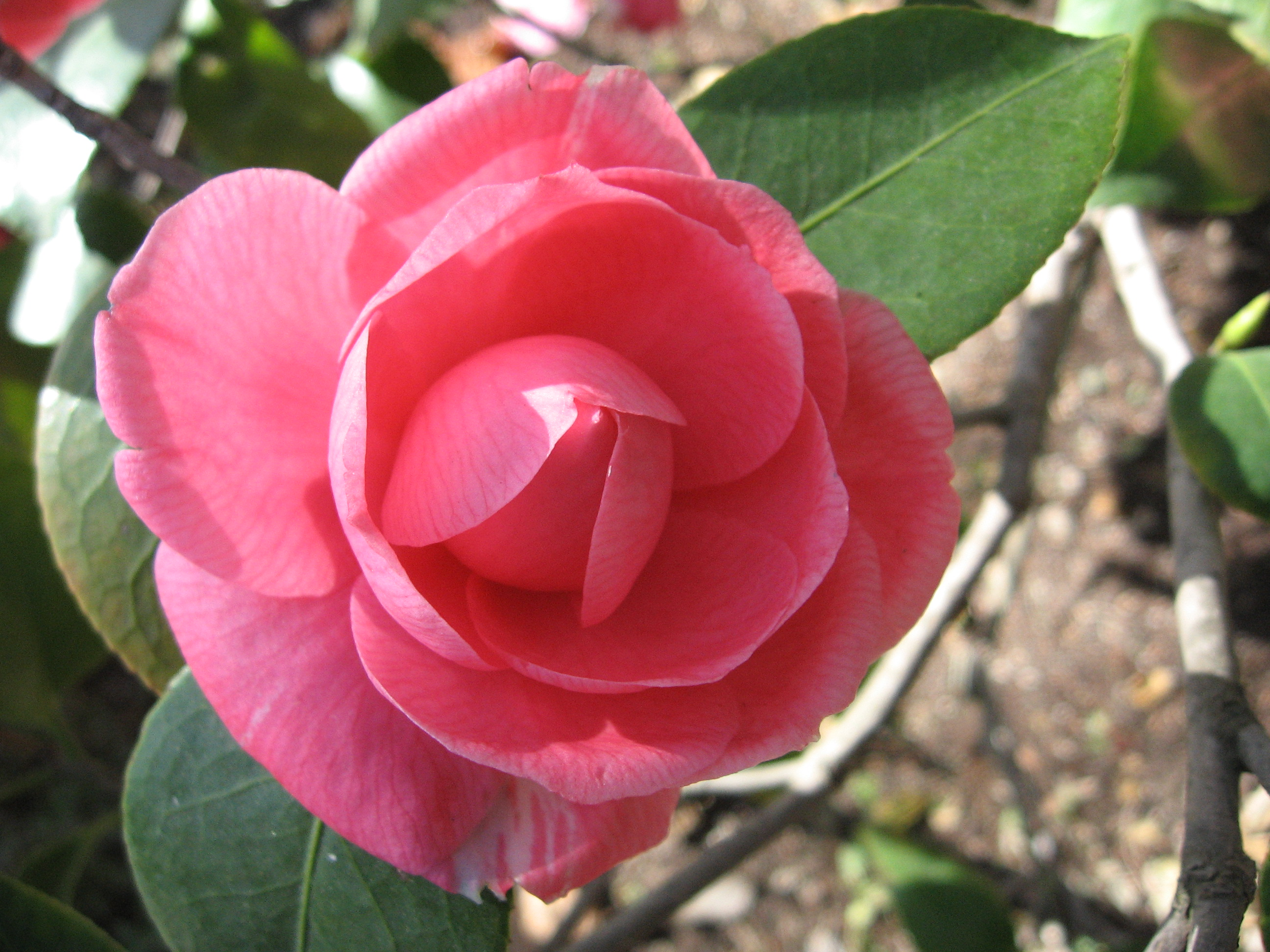
'La Sonnambula'

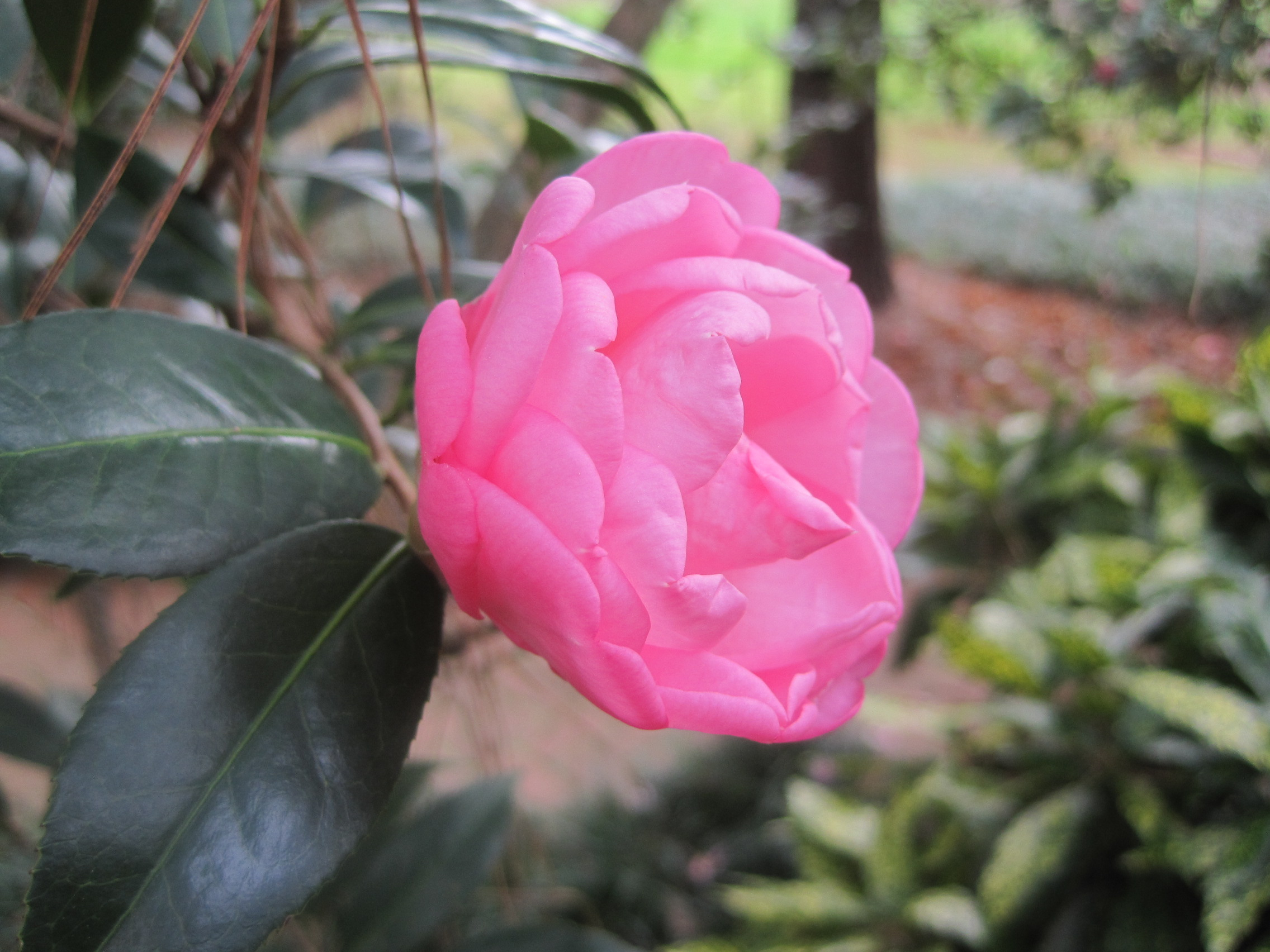
'Taylor's Perfection'

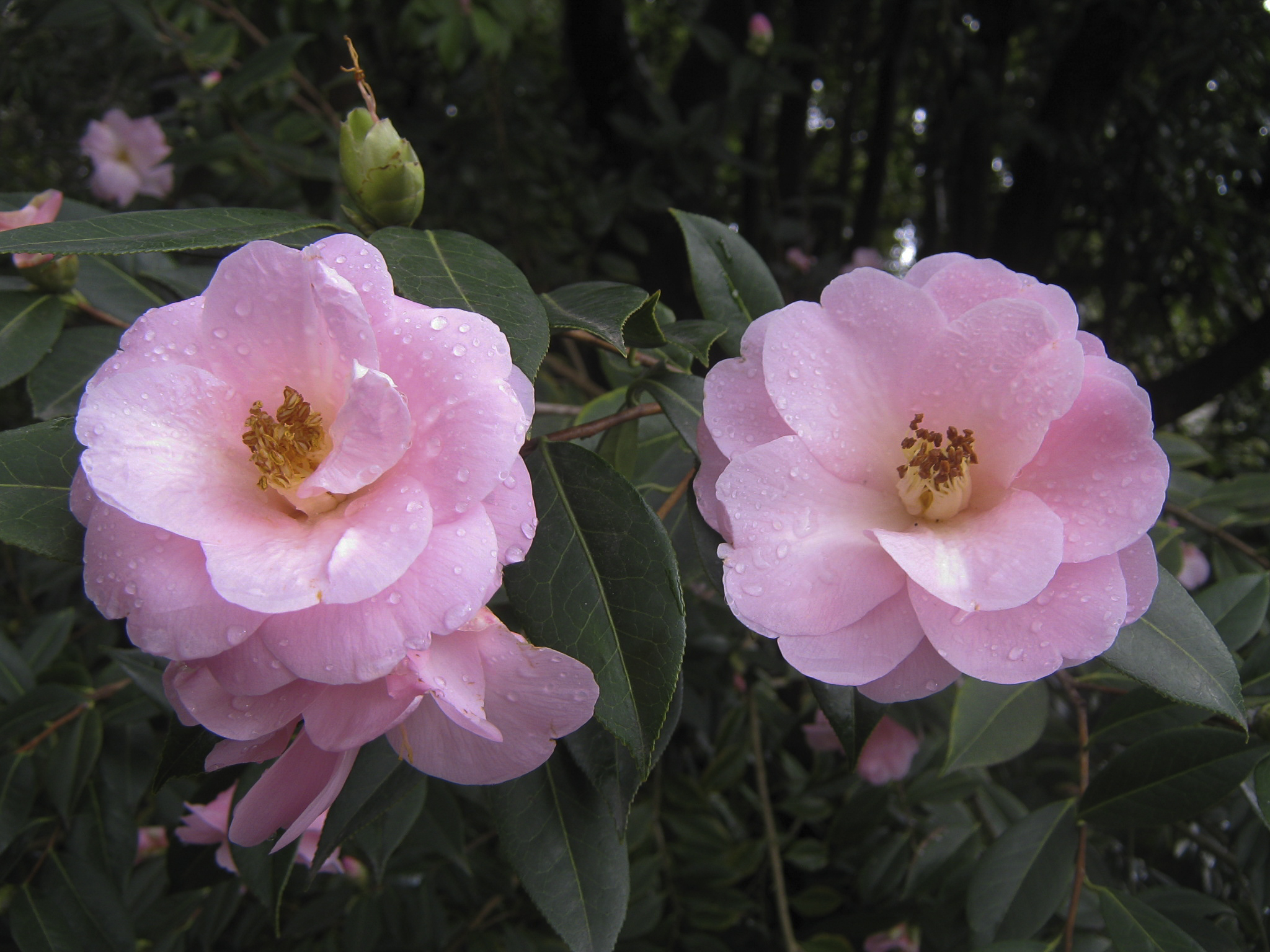
'Margaret Waterhouse'

== Cultivation ==
Camellia × williamsii is an excellent companion to other acid-loving woodland plants such as rhododendron. It grows best in acid soil, ph5.5-6.5, in a sunny or partially shaded, sheltered position. In areas with frost and cold winds, it should be positioned facing away from the morning sun, as the flower buds are easily damaged.

== See also ==
- List of Award of Garden Merit camellias
- Eben Gowrie Waterhouse
