= Burncoose =

Hamlet in Cornwall, England

Coordinates: 50.212°N 5.166°W

Burncoose: Cornish: Broncoosp
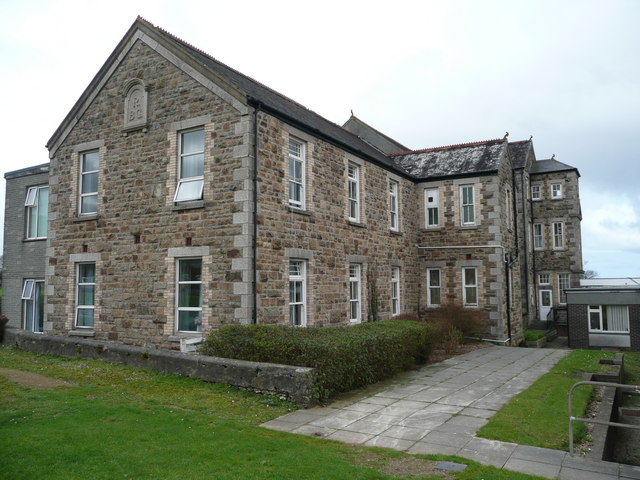
- Camborne Redruth Community Hospital, Burncoose

- Location within Cornwall
- OS grid reference: SW741395
- Civil parish: Gwennap
- Unitary authority: Cornwall
- Ceremonial county: Cornwall
- Region: South West
- Country: England
- Sovereign state: United Kingdom
- Post town: REDRUTH
- Postcode district: TR16
- Dialling code: 01872
- Police: Devon and Cornwall
- Fire: Cornwall
- Ambulance: South Western
- UK Parliament: Truro and Falmouth

Burncoose is a hamlet near Gwennap in west Cornwall, England; Burncoose lies on the A393 road, 4 miles (6.4 km) south-east of Redruth. It was first recorded in 1277 as Burncoys, an anglicized name from the Cornish Broncoos, meaning "wood hill".

== See also ==
- Williams family of Caerhays and Burncoose
