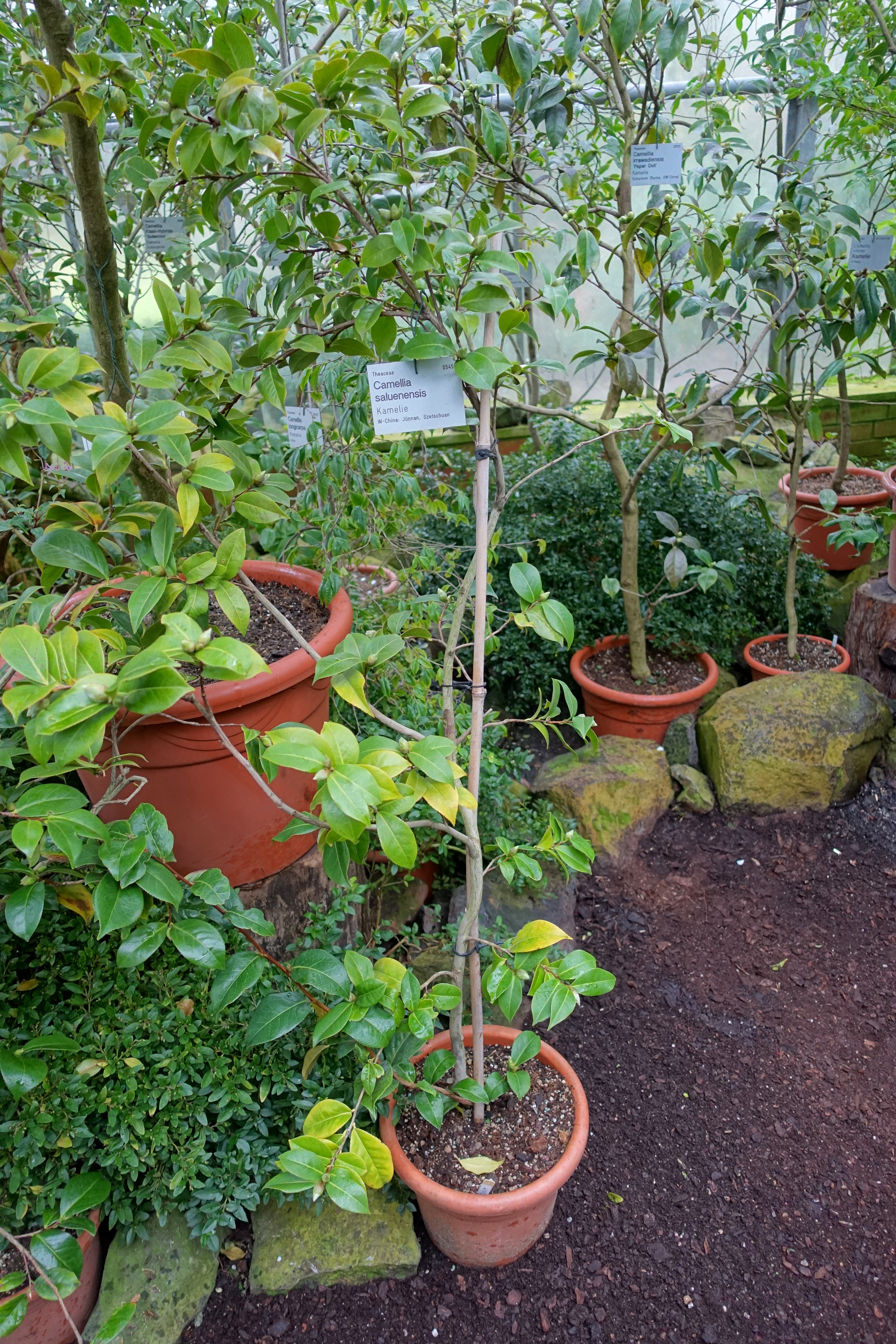

Scientific classification
- Kingdom: Plantae
- Clade: Tracheophytes
- Clade: Angiosperms
- Clade: Eudicots
- Clade: Asterids
- Order: Ericales
- Family: Theaceae
- Genus: Camellia
- Species: C. saluenensis

Binomial name
- Camellia saluenensis Stapf ex Bean

Synonyms
- List: Camellia glabriperulata Hung T.Chang; Camellia minor Hung T.Chang; Camellia phaeoclada Hung T.Chang; Camellia saluenensis var. minor (Sealy) Hung T.Chang; Camellia tenuivalvis Hung T.Chang; Camellia weiningensis Y.K.Li

= Camellia saluenensis =

Species of plant

Camellia saluenensis is a species of Camellia native to south‑central China. A large bush, it is a parent of a number of garden hybrids. 'Cornish Snow' (C. cuspidata × C. saluenensis) which flowers in midwinter, and 'Inspiration' (C. reticulata × C. saluenensis) have both gained the Royal Horticultural Society's Award of Garden Merit.
