= Cornish currency =

- £5 and £1 issued by the Cornish stannary parliament 1974

Unit
- Unit: pound sterling
- Symbol: d, £, /~

Denominations
- Subunit
- 1/100: dynar
- Banknotes: 500d, £1, 5/~, 10/~, 50p

Demographics
- User(s): Cornwall see also Constitutional Status of Cornwall

Currency, in the form of coins, has been issued in Cornwall periodically since at least the 10th century AD, while banknotes were issued into the 19th century.

== Cornish mints ==
The earliest known Cornish mint was at Launceston (originally at St Stephen by Launceston), which operated on a minimal scale at the time of Ethelred II, in 976 AD (that is, before Cornwall received full diocesan jurisdiction in the year 994 AD). Only one specimen, a heavy (1.61 gram) coin, is known to exist. After the Norman Conquest, Robert, Count of Mortain (William the Conqueror's half-brother) was given much of Cornwall, including Dunheved and rebuilt the castle there. He expropriated the market and mint from the canons of St Stephen and the townspeople followed these to Dunheved. The mint was reopened halfway through the Conqueror's reign.

Another early reference to the Cornish currency, the "dynar," is found in a thirteenth-century Cornish play containing the line "dhodh a dela pymp cans dyner", which translates as "he was owed five hundred dyner." The only English coin at the time was the silver penny: presumably the dynar was equivalent to this.

A Royalist mint was established in Truro in 1642–43 during the English Civil War by Sir Richard Vyvyan; in September 1643 it was moved to Exeter.

== Cornish banks ==
Several Cornish towns in the mining districts set up their own banks and even issued their own banknotes. One example is 'The Mounts Bay Commercial Bank' which was set up 1807 by the Bolitho family of Penzance. The Consolidated Bank of Cornwall was taken over by Barclays Bank in 1905. In 2004 a rare banknote from the Falmouth bank sold for £540. Several other examples of Cornish banknotes are held at the County Museum in Truro.

== Stannary money ==
In more recent times Cornish currency was issued by the Cornish Stannary Parliament in 1974 under the name of the 'Cornish National Fund'. The Cornish National Fund was established with the objective of raising funds to assist with a "campaign for the restitution of Cornwall’s legal right to partially govern itself and to raise appreciation within Cornwall of the aims of the Stannary Parliament."

The 1974 banknotes were issued in denominations of 5 shillings, 10 shillings, 1 pound and 5 pounds. Cornish language text on the front of the 5 shilling note can be translated as: 'The National Fund of Cornwall promises to pay the bearer one day after sight the amount of five shillings.' In 1985 the Cornish Stannary Parliament issued notes of two denominations –- 50 pence and 1 pound—and were sold at a premium as a matching pair as a fund raising exercise. In 2000 the Revived Cornish Stannary Parliament issued new banknotes in the denomination of 500 Dynars to commemorate the 200-year anniversary of Richard Trevithick's steam car climbing Camborne Hill on Christmas Eve 1801. On the front of the note there is a depiction of Saint Piran (Peran Sans), carrying his banner and standing before a stone cross.

On 15 December 1974, it was announced that Frederick Trull, styled "clerk to the Stannary", was to issue banknotes in four denominations. Following an incident on 26 February 1975 when Trull attempted to arrest the clerk and magistrate while being tried for a motoring offence at St Austell Magistrate's Court, he was found guilty of using threatening words and behaviour with intent to provoke a breach of the peace on 2 June 1975. He produced twenty-five pages of documents in an attempt to prove that the court had no jurisdiction but was fined, ordered to pay costs, and bound over to keep the peace for twelve months. He was subsequently dismissed from his post as clerk to the stannary and expelled from the organisation. The banknotes, which bore Trull's signature, were burnt.

== Cornish tokens ==
Cornish tokens sometimes called Cornish Pennies were trade tokens widely used in the 18th and 19th century in Cornwall.

- One dated 1811 had the words, "For the accommodation of the county," in the centre was a pilchard between cakes of copper and ingots of tin. On the other side were the words Cornish penny, in the centre a view of a mine pumping engine and winding gear.
- The 1791 Cornwall Conder Token, (halfpenny) had "Cornish Copper Half an Ounce" written around a Duchy bezant shield and a druid's head on the reverse.
- Cornish pennies issued by John Williams of Scorrier House are also found: one dated 1812 has on the obverse the badge of the Prince of Wales (three plumes) and on the reverse a view of a mine pumping engine and winding gear and "Payable at Scorrier House / One pound for 240 tokens".
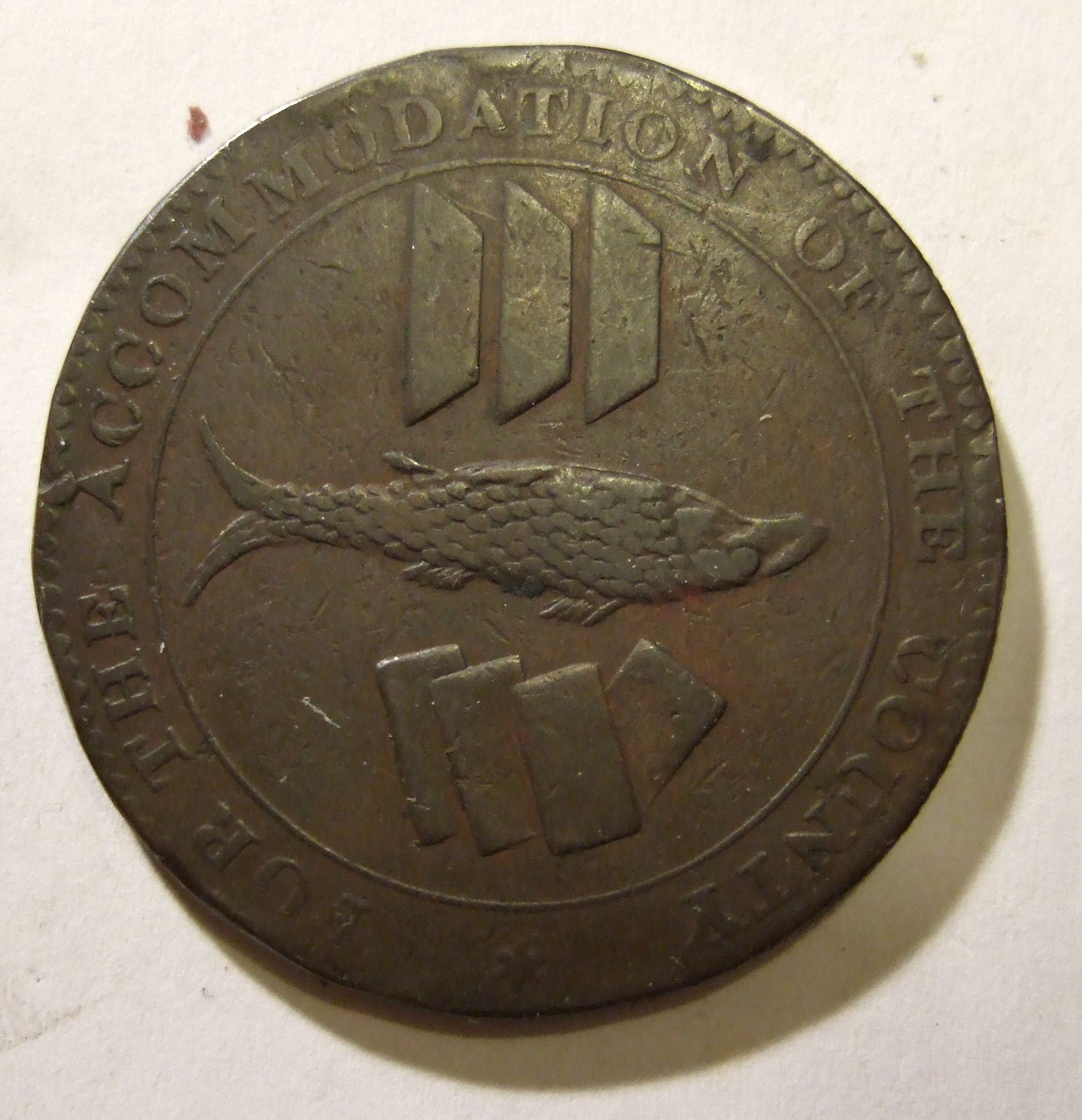
1811 Cornish penny showing a pilchard between cakes of copper and ingots of tin

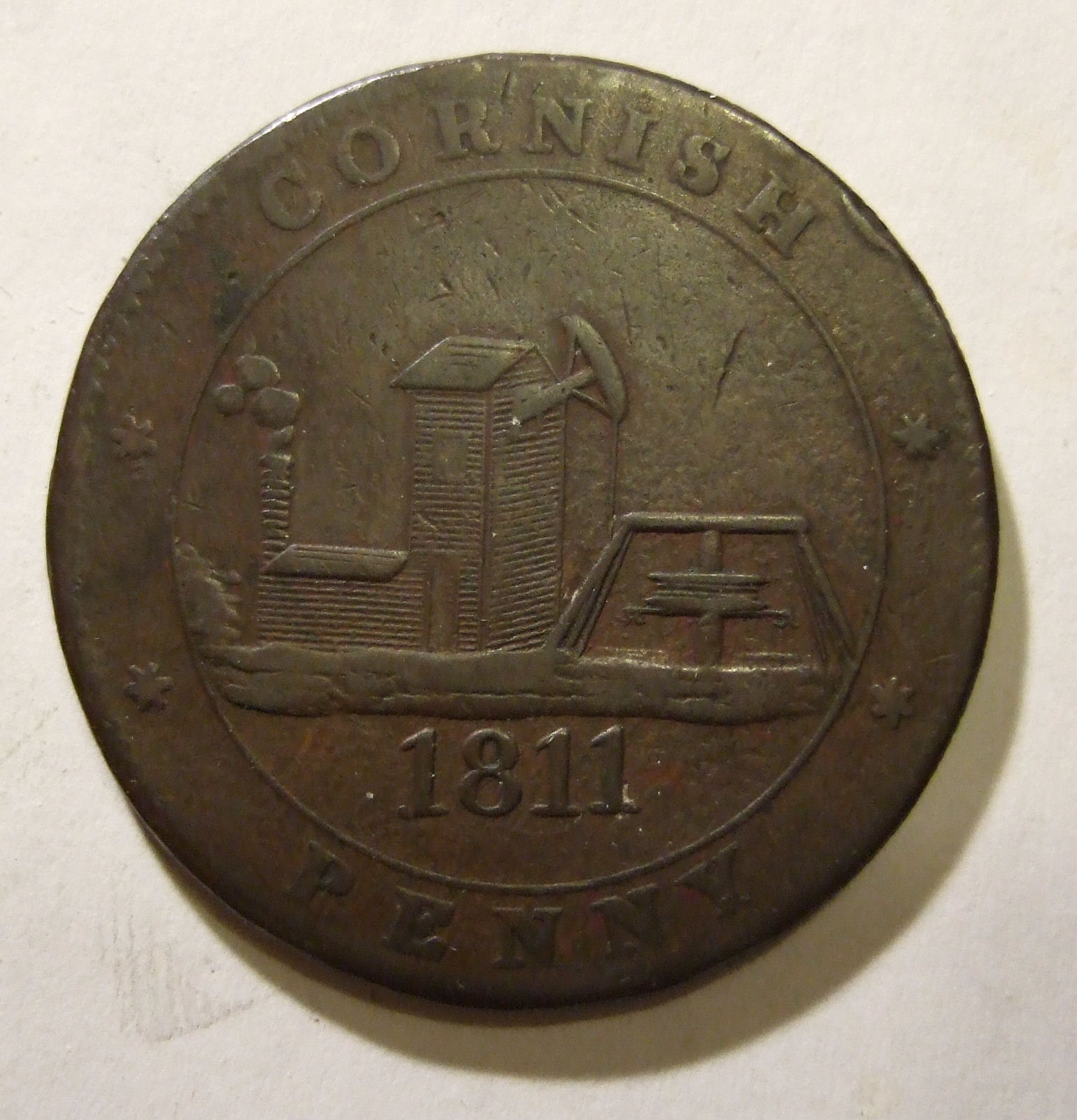
1811 Cornish penny showing a mine pumping engine and winding gear

== See also ==
- William John Hocking of the Royal Mint

== Bibliography ==
- Williams, J. A. (1971) Cornish Tokens. Truro: D. Bradford Barton ISBN 0-85153-018-4
