= John Charles Williams =

English Liberal Unionist politician and gardener

John Charles Williams (30 April 1861 – 29 March 1939) was an English Liberal Unionist politician and a noted gardener at Caerhays Castle, Cornwall, where he grew and bred rhododendrons and other plants. An important group of camellia cultivars, Camellia × williamsii, was originally bred by him. He also took an interest in the development of new daffodil cultivars.

== Early life ==
He was educated at Rugby School and at Trinity Hall, Cambridge.

== Career ==
In 1882 he acquired the estate of Werrington, then in Devon and since 1974 in Cornwall. He was one of the largest land-owners of north Cornwall having bought more than 5,000 acres (2,000 ha), mostly in the parishes of St Columb Major, St Ervan and St Issey, in the 1880s. He was elected at the 1892 general election as the Member of Parliament (MP) for Truro, and held the seat until he stood down at the 1895 general election. He was High Sheriff of Cornwall in 1888, and Lord Lieutenant of Cornwall from 1918 to 1936.

== See also ==
- Williams family of Caerhays and Burncoose

Parliament of the United Kingdom
Preceded by William Bickford-Smith	Member of Parliament for Truro; 1892–1895	Succeeded by Edwin Durning-Lawrence
