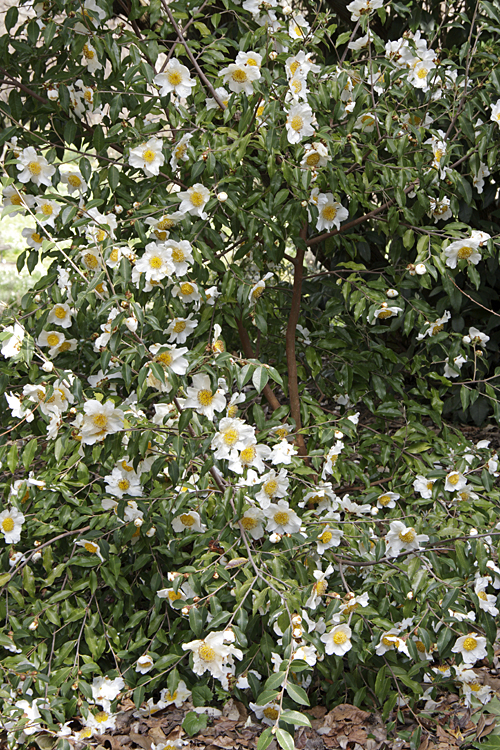
- In flower
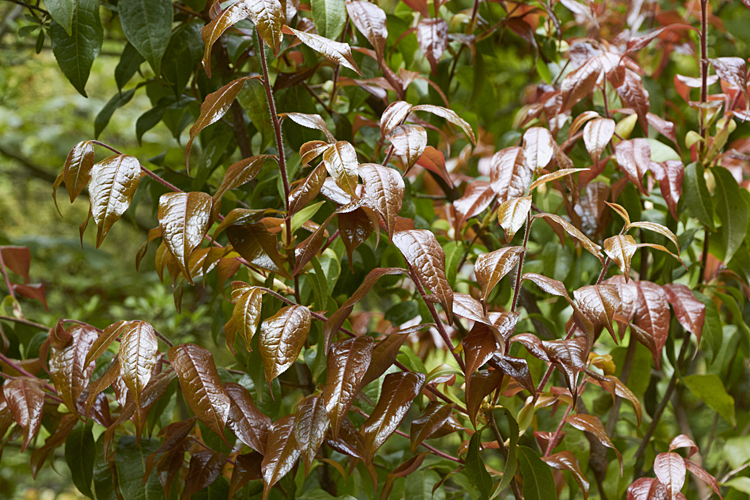
- Young foliage

Conservation status
- Least Concern (IUCN 3.1)

Scientific classification
- Kingdom: Plantae
- Clade: Tracheophytes
- Clade: Angiosperms
- Clade: Eudicots
- Clade: Asterids
- Order: Ericales
- Family: Theaceae
- Genus: Camellia
- Species: C. yunnanensis

Binomial name
- Camellia yunnanensis Cohen Stuart

= Camellia yunnanensis =

Species of flowering plant

Camellia yunnanensis is a 1.3–7 m tall shrub or small tree endemic to China.

Its leaves are elliptic to broad-elliptic or ovate-elliptic, bluntly acute. They are deep green.

Its flowers is white, perulate and solitary.

== Distribution ==
It is distributed in Sichuan, Yunnan, and Guizhou Provinces, China.

The plants was introduced to Japan after 1979 in the form of seeds and scions for grafting.
