= Scorrier =

Village in Cornwall, England

Coordinates: 50.258°N 5.199°W

Scorrier: Cornish: Skorya
- Village
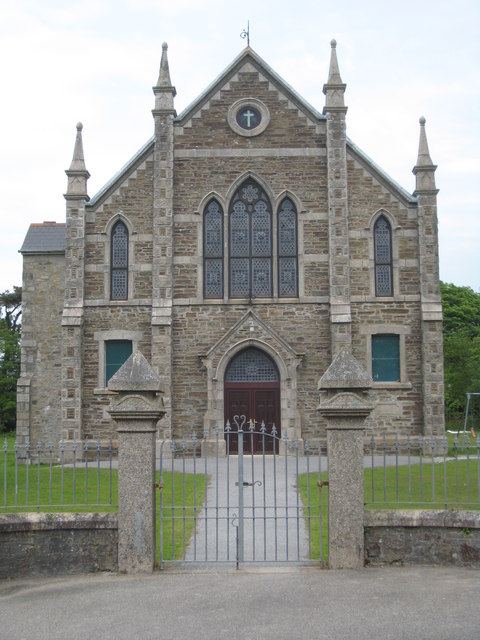
- Scorrier Methodist Church

- Location within Cornwall
- Unitary authority: Cornwall
- Region: South West
- Country: England
- Sovereign state: United Kingdom
- Police: Devon and Cornwall
- Fire: Cornwall
- Ambulance: South Western

Scorrier (Cornish: Skorya, meaning mine waste) is a village in Cornwall, England, United Kingdom. It is in the civil parish of St Day, about 2 miles (3 km) northeast of the centre of Redruth and 3 miles (5 km) southeast of the coast at Porthtowan, on the A30 road at the junction of the A3047 road that leads west to Camborne and the B3298 road south to Carharrack. The Plymouth to Penzance railway line passes through the village and between 1852 and 1964 it had its own station. A. E. Rodda & Son, the principal maker of clotted cream is based here.

== History ==
The village is in the Gwennap Mining District of the Cornwall and West Devon Mining Landscape World Heritage Site.

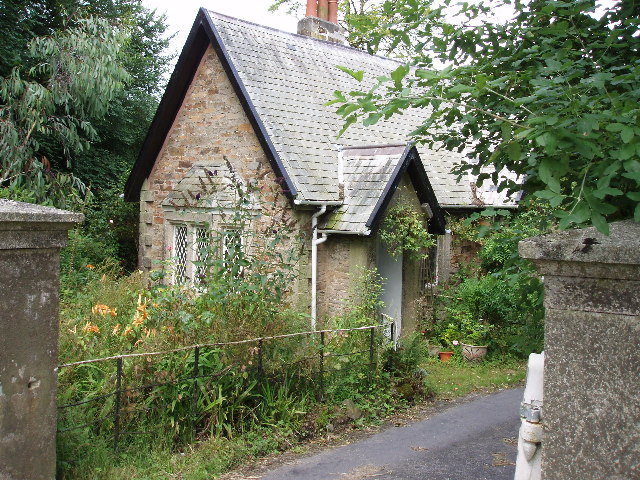
The lodge to Tregullow House

Tregullow House was a country house that had been passed down through the Williams family, a well-known local family that had made their fortune in the mining of tin and copper. At Tregullow there are two Cornish crosses: one of them formerly stood between Ponsanooth and Pengreep and was for a time used as a gatepost.

Assa Govranckowe 1580, Kyver Ankou circa 1720, is a place on the Penwith – Kerrier boundary near Scorrier. Its toponym is derived from keverangow (meaning "hundreds") in the Cornish language. Here the four western hundreds of Cornwall meet at one point (Penwith, northwest; Kerrier, southwest; Powder, southeast; Pydar, northeast).

== Scorrier House ==
Scorrier House, just south of the village, was built in 1778 by John Williams the Third of the Williams family, from the fortune he made from tin mining; it was substantially enlarged in 1845.

== Notable people ==
- Williams baronets of Tregullow (1866)
