= Caerhays Castle =

Country house in Cornwall, England

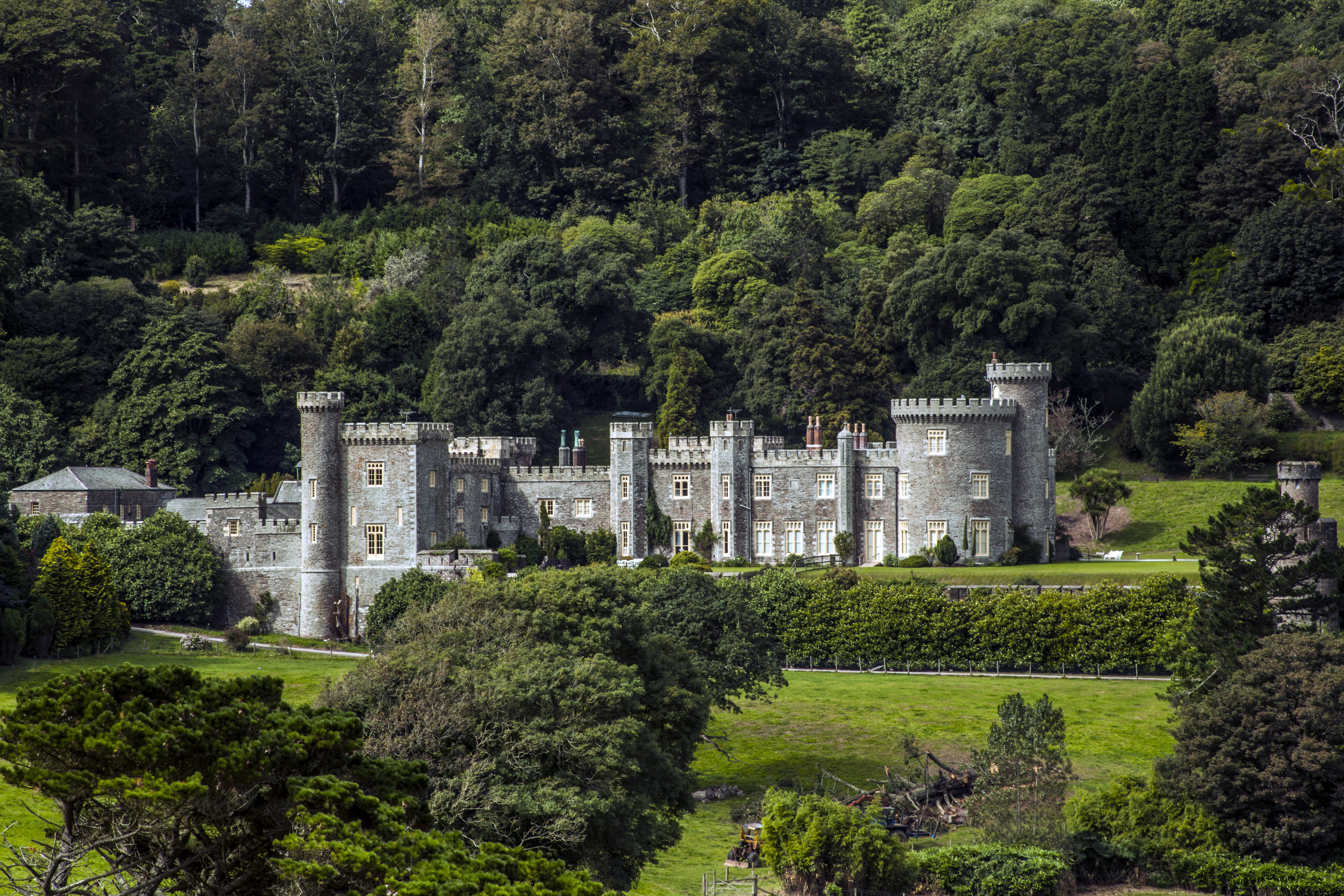
- The castle from the south east

- Location within Cornwall
- 50.2396°N 4.8467°W
- Location: St Michael Caerhays, Cornwall, England

History
- Built: 1807–1810

Site notes
- Architect: John Nash

Listed Building – Grade I
- Designated: 15 November 1988
- Reference no.: 1327071

National Register of Historic Parks and Gardens
- Designated: 11 June 1987
- Reference no.: 1000448

Caerhays Castle or Carhayes Castle (Cornish: Kastel Karyhes) is a semi-castellated country house built in 1808, 0.5 mi (0.80 km) south of the village centre, St Michael Caerhays, Cornwall, England. It overlooks Porthluney Cove on the English Channel. The garden has a large collection of magnolias.

== History ==
In the Early Middle Ages, the manor belonged to the Arundell family. The earliest record of the name is Karihaes in 1259, and is recorded as Carihays in 1379, but its original meaning is obscure. In about 1379, it passed by marriage to the Trevanion family after the marriage of Robert Trevanion to Johanna Arundell, daughter and heiress of Rudolph Arundell of Caerhays. John Trevanion inherited the estate in 1703 after which he improved the manor house existing on the site and developed gardens.

With the death of William Trevanion in 1767, the estate passed to his sister's son, John Bettesworth. John's son, John Bettesworth-Trevanion, built the present castle on a site close to the former manor house between 1807 and 1810; his architect was the Anglo-Welsh John Nash. The castle was built close to the site of the original ancient home that had itself undergone expansion during the reign of King Henry VIII.

After Bettesworth-Trevanion left for Paris, unable to pay his bills, Michael Williams II purchased Caerhays from his creditors in 1854. As the house had been unoccupied for over a decade and had not been watertight for some of that time, his younger brother Sir William Williams, 1st Baronet, of Tregullow (1791–1870), with his son John Michael Williams (1813–1880), JP, DL, initiated an extensive repair programme. Michael Williams II died in 1858 and left Caerhays to his eldest son John Michael Williams (1813–1880), whilst he left Scorrier House to his sixth son George Williams (1827–1891), DL, JP, High Sheriff of Cornwall in 1875.

After the death of John Michael Williams in 1880 his second son, John Charles Williams (1861–1939), then aged 18, inherited the Caerhays estate. (His elder brother was Michael Williams (1857–1899) of Gnaton Hall, who died without progeny). John Charles Williams married in 1884, at which time the house again went through restoration and alteration. He became a plantsman, sponsoring plant-hunting expeditions in order to fill the castle garden with new acquisitions. Seeds brought back from China by Ernest Henry Wilson in 1903 were donated to J.C. Williams by Harry Veitch. There is an important mineral collection, much from the Williams's family mines in Cornwall but also obtained by purchase. The current owner in 2023 is Charles Williams.

== Construction ==
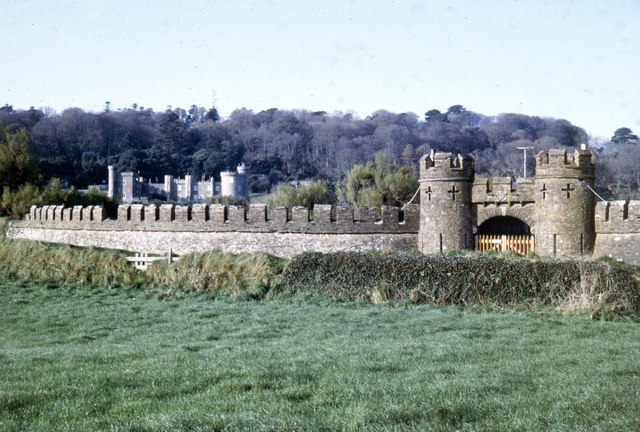
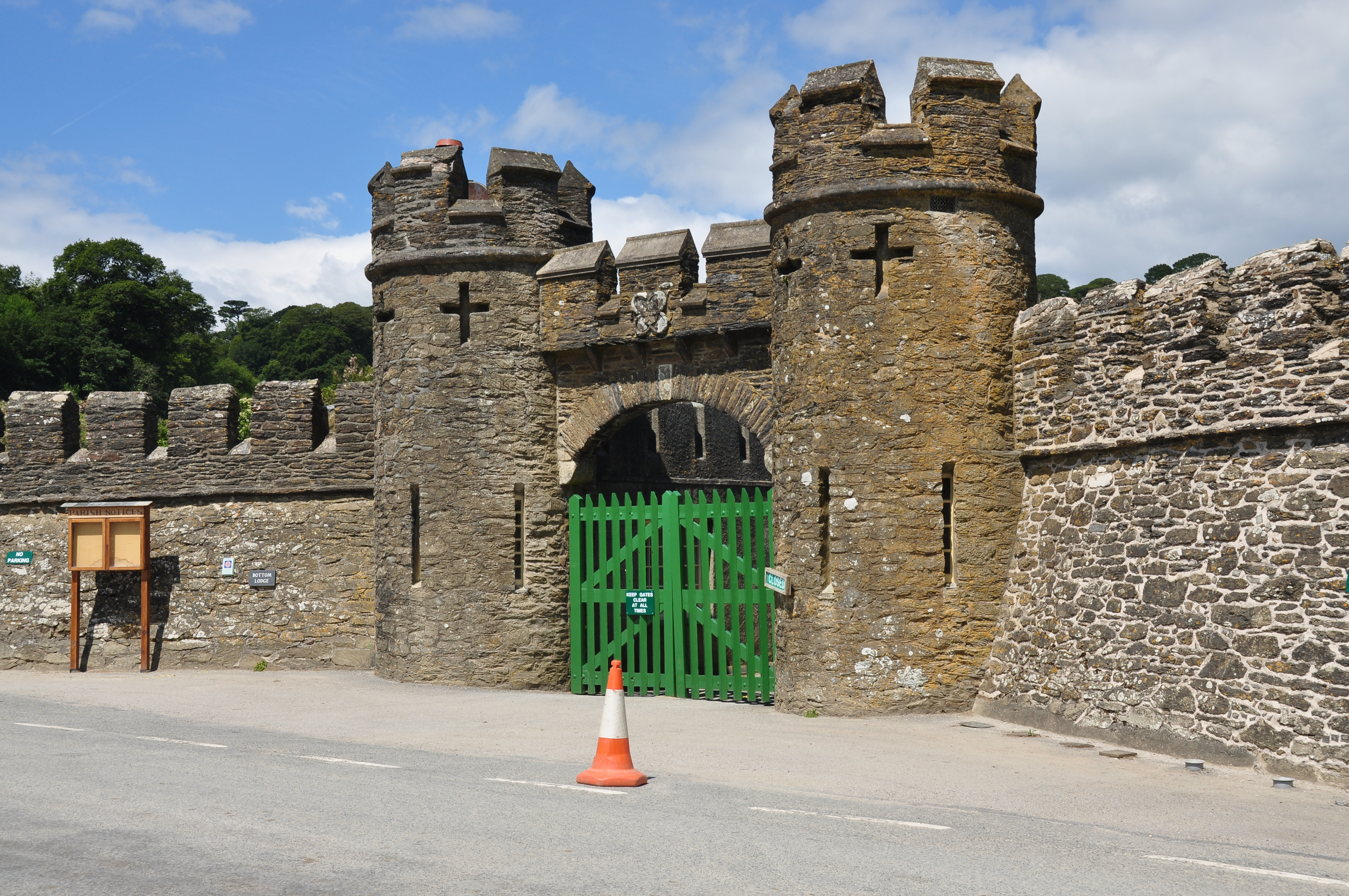
Caerhayes Castle

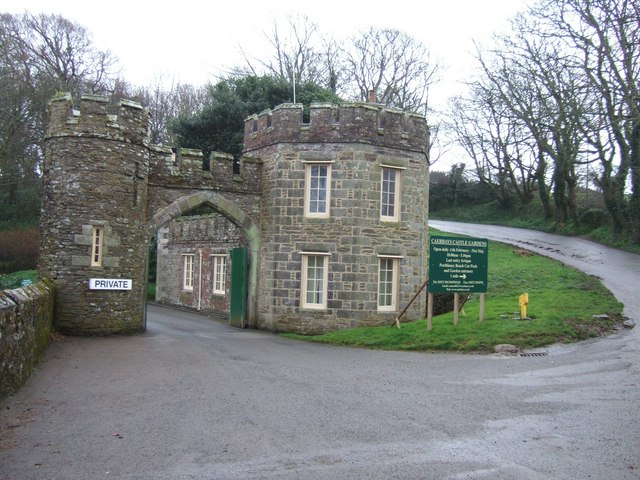
The main gatehouse

The exterior, bearing the appearance of a Norman castle, was built of rough stone quarried from the immediate neighbourhood. The front entrance, 160 ft (49 m) in length, has a southern exposure and is elevated on an embattled terrace. The principal rooms toward the south and east, joined by a large gallery room. Painted glass adorns the windows of the dining room, staircase, and entrance hall.

Parts of the original manor remain, including the ancient chapel as well as an old walkway to the sea which retains the name of the Watchhouse Walk.

== Historical preservation ==
The castle became a Grade I listed building on 15 November 1988. Other Grade I listed buildings associated with the castle include the garden wall with gateways and folly tower that is attached to the west and east of the castle, the Higher Lodge, the Lower Lodge with attached screen walls, and also the service buildings attached to the south-west of the castle.

== Garden ==
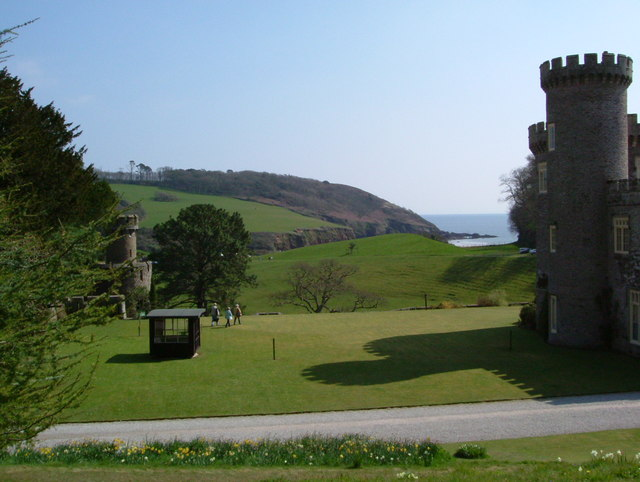
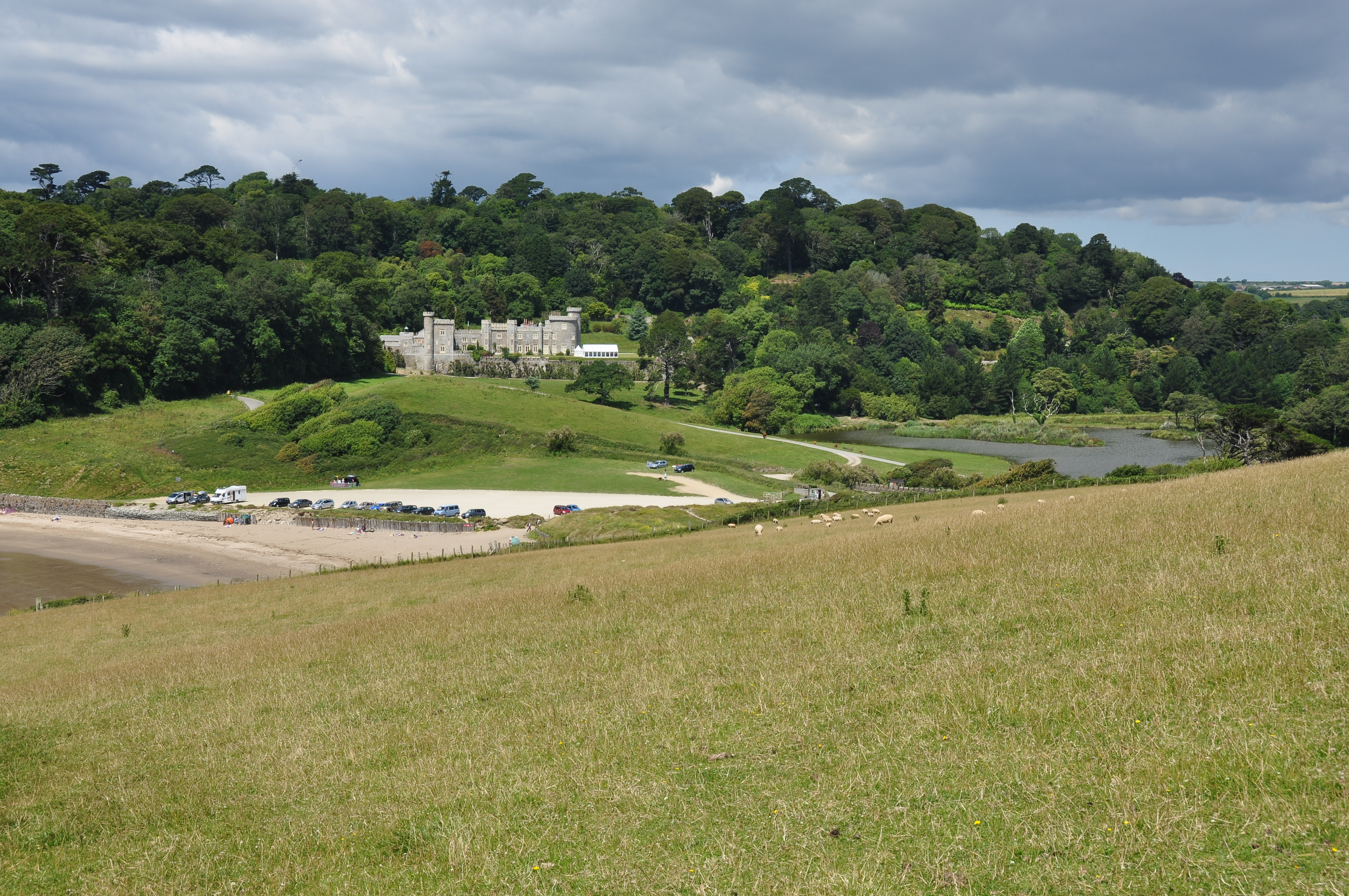
The sweeping lawns to the castle

The castle's garden covers almost 120 acres (0.49 km^{2}), traversed by four named routes, and navigated by trails, grassy paths, and steps. The garden is home to 600 varieties of plants, including trees and shrubs, such as azaleas and camellias. By 1917, it had over 250 types of rhododendron. Its magnolia trees are accredited with Plant Heritage under the National Plant Collection scheme.

== In modern popular culture ==
Caerhays was used as the outside shots for the 1979 miniseries adaptation of Rebecca. Filming for Miss Peregrine's Home for Peculiar Children took place over three months on the estate and at Porthluney Cove in 2015. Caerhays features in the later Poldark novels, where Ross and Demelza Poldark's son Jeremy meets a love interest at Caerhays. The novels stress both the magnificence of the castle, and the ruinous cost to the Trevanions of rebuilding it.
