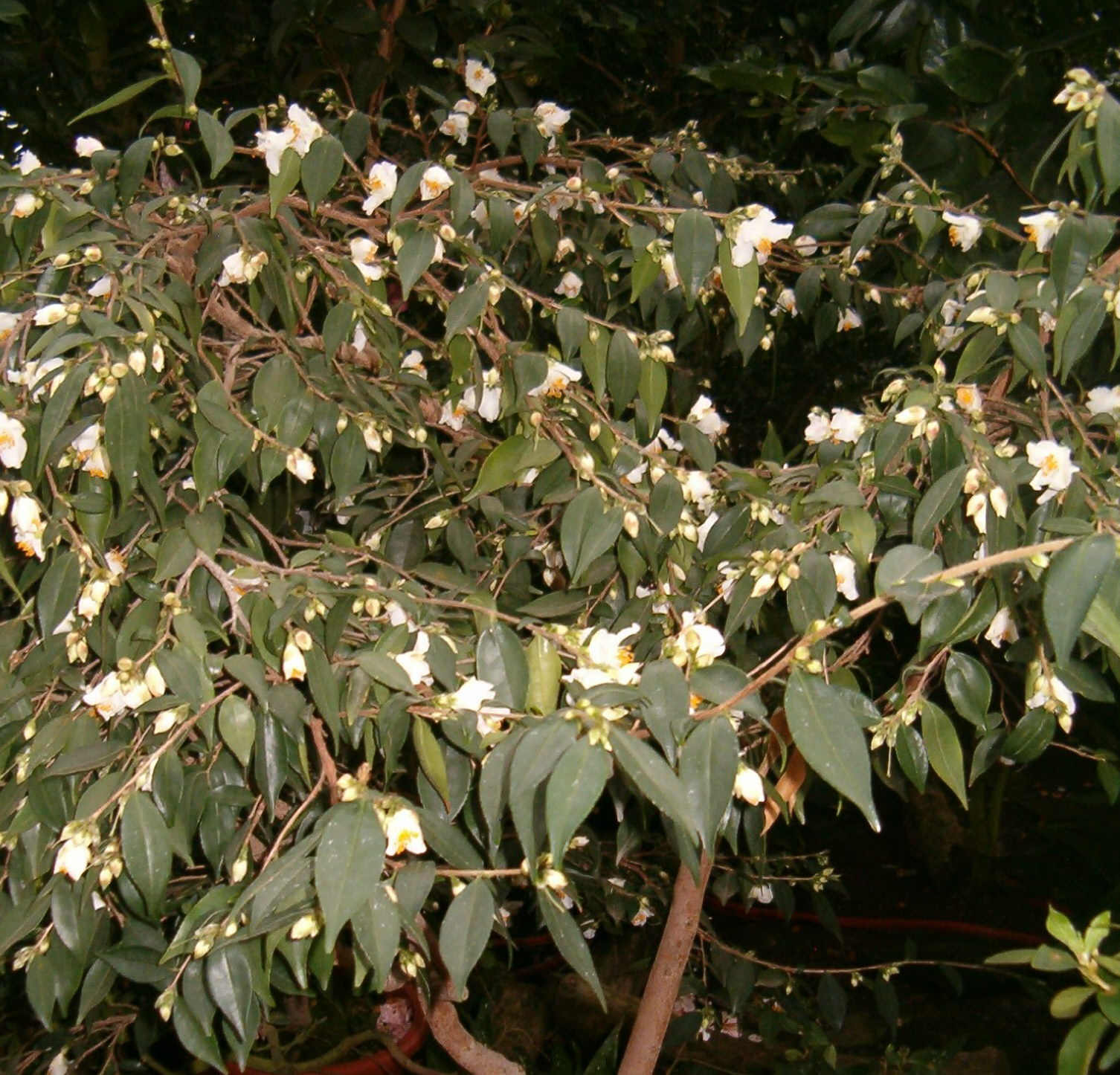

Conservation status
- Least Concern (IUCN 3.1)

Scientific classification
- Kingdom: Plantae
- Clade: Tracheophytes
- Clade: Angiosperms
- Clade: Eudicots
- Clade: Asterids
- Order: Ericales
- Family: Theaceae
- Genus: Camellia
- Species: C. cuspidata

Binomial name
- Camellia cuspidata (Kochs) H.J. Veitch 1912

= Camellia cuspidata =

Species of flowering plant

Camellia cuspidata, also known by the common name cuspidate camellia, is a species in the genus Camellia, in the family Theaceae. It is native to China, specifically the west. It occurs in the provinces of Anhui, Fujian, Guangdong, Guangxi, Guizhou, Hubei, Hunan, Jiangxi, Shaanxi, Sichuan, Yunnan, Zhejiang.

== Description ==
C. cuspidata is an evergreen shrub which reaches up to 3 metres in height at maturity. Its leaves are a glossy dark green, and its flowers, which measure 2–3 centimetres across, are pure white. It flowers from December–April, and fruits from August–October.

== Etymology ==
Camellia is named for Georg Joseph Kamel (1661–1706), a Jesuit missionary, pharmacist and naturalist.

Cuspidata means 'suddenly narrowed to a short, rigid tip', like a canine tooth.

== Gallery ==
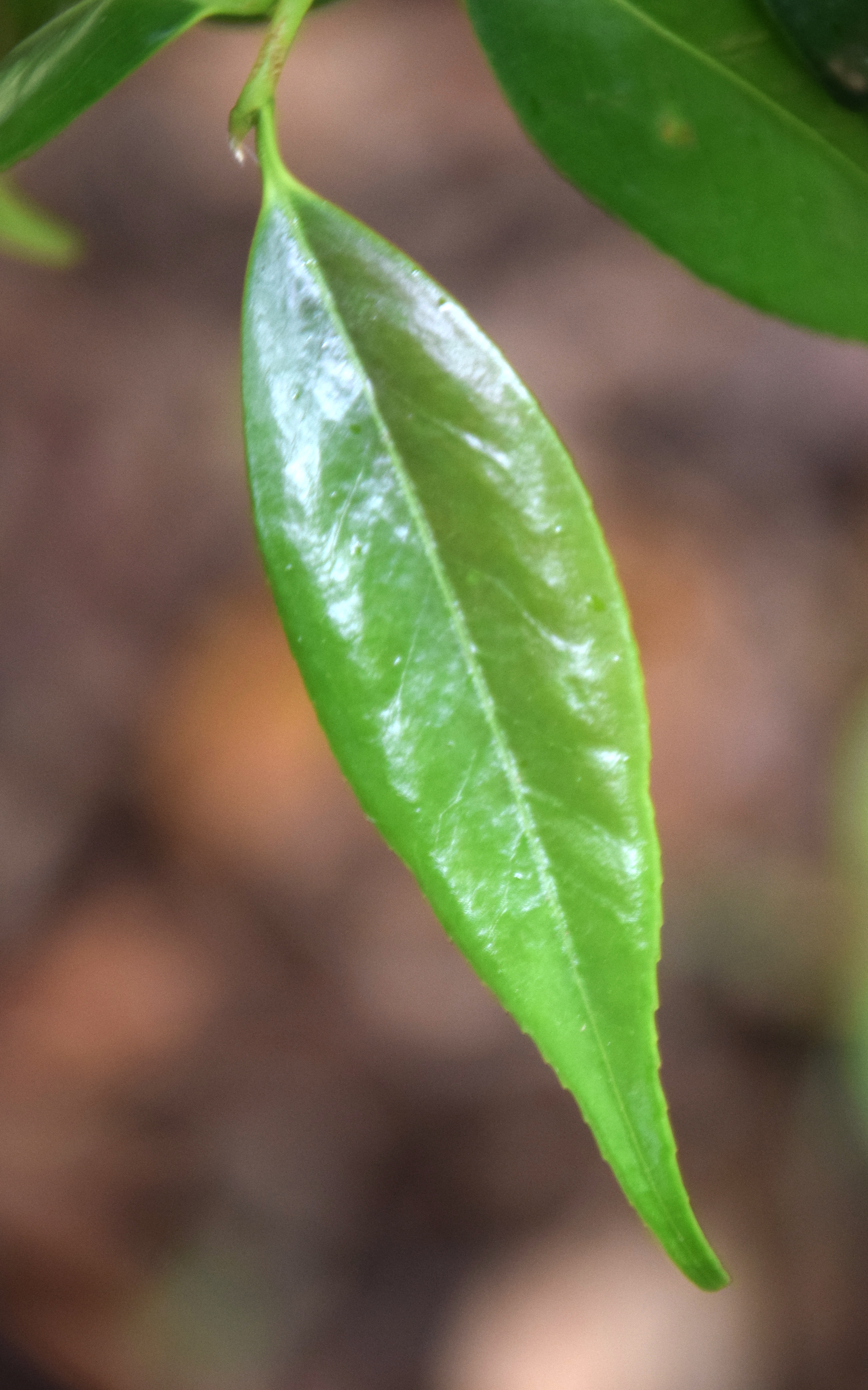

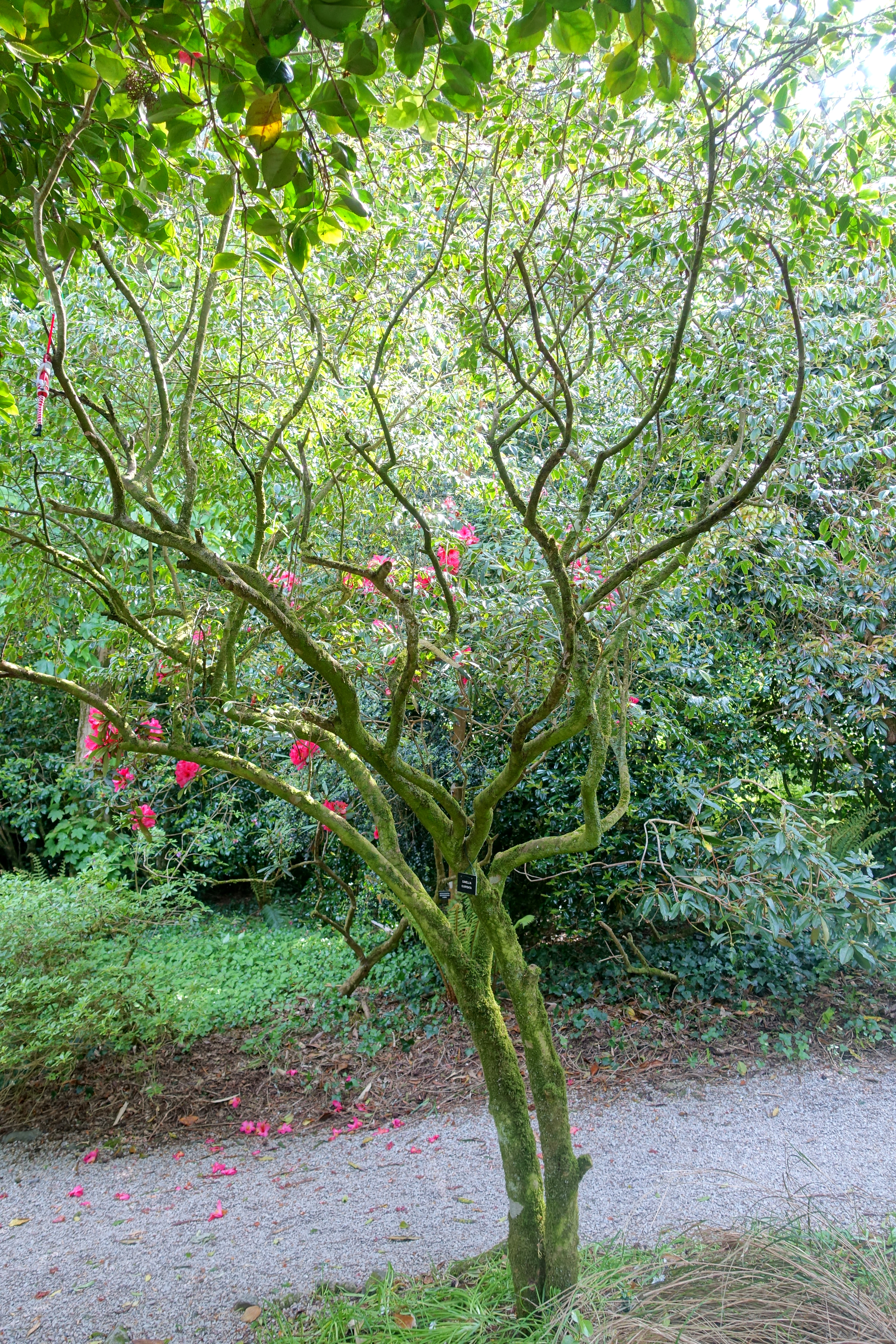

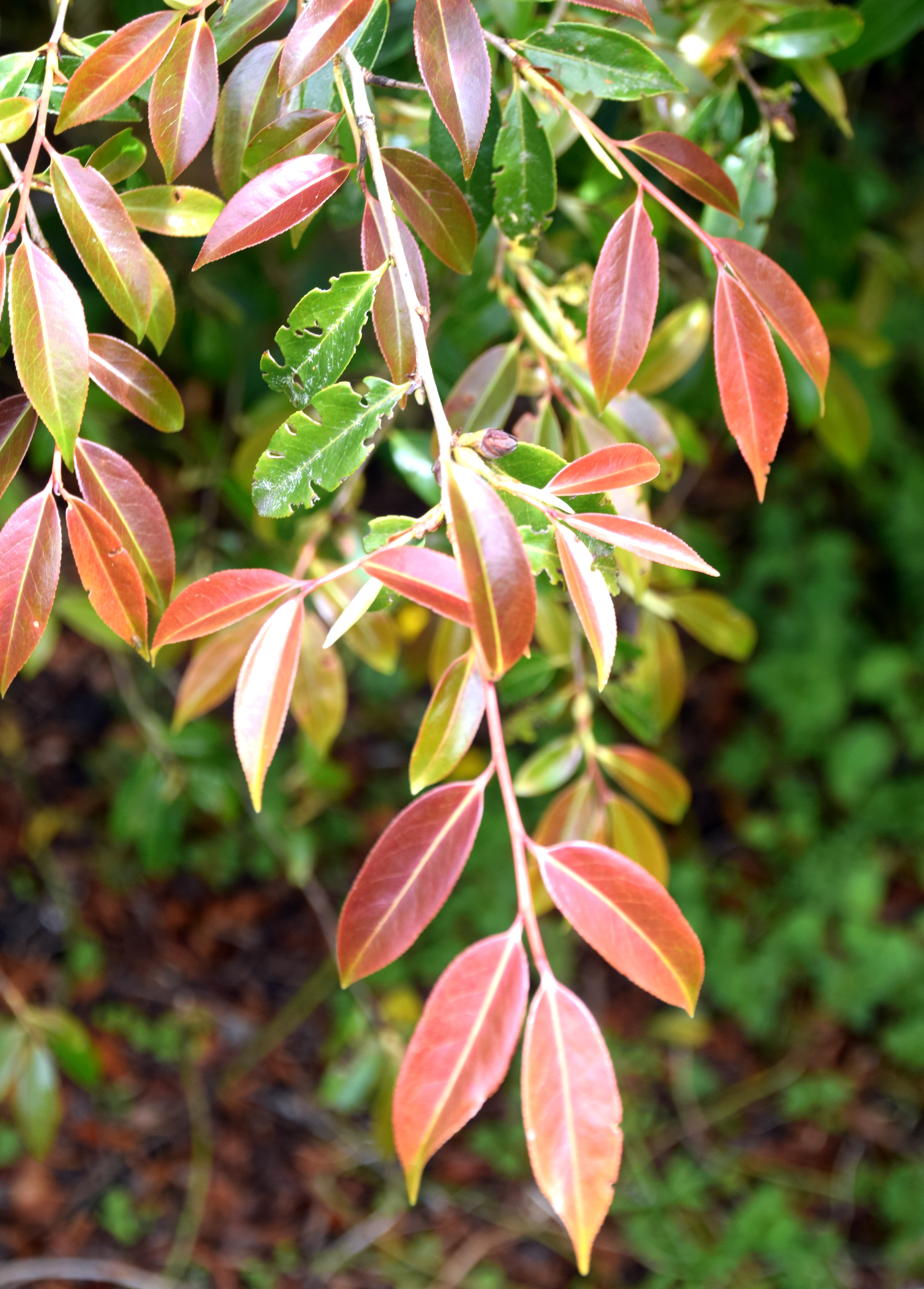
