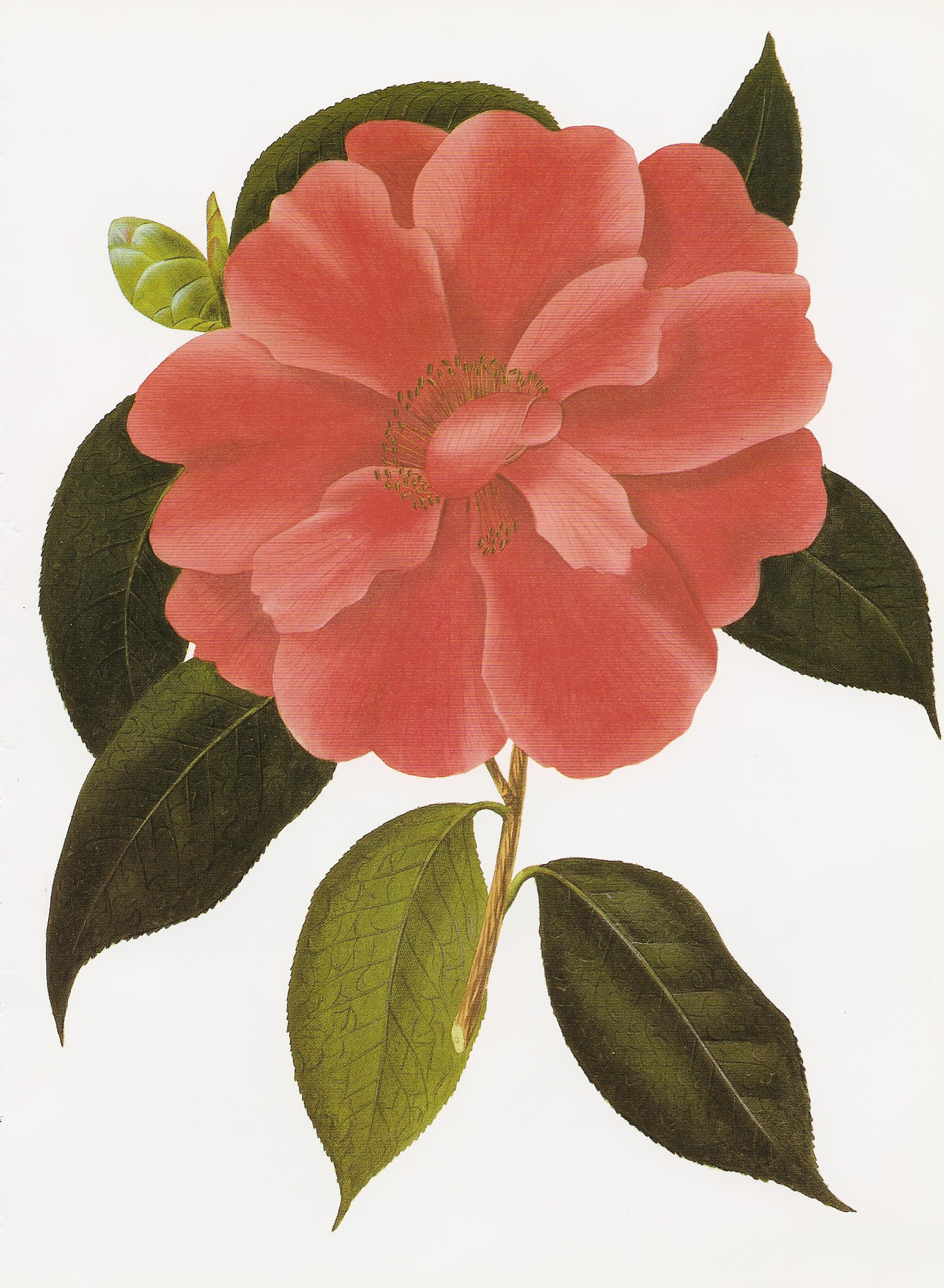

Conservation status
- Data Deficient (IUCN 3.1)

Scientific classification
- Kingdom: Plantae
- Clade: Tracheophytes
- Clade: Angiosperms
- Clade: Eudicots
- Clade: Asterids
- Order: Ericales
- Family: Theaceae
- Genus: Camellia
- Species: C. reticulata

Binomial name
- Camellia reticulata Lindl.

Synonyms
- Camellia albescens H.T.Chang; Camellia albosericea H.T.Chang; Camellia bailinshanica H.T.Chang, H.S.Liu & G.X.Xiang; Camellia bambusifolia H.T.Chang, H.S.Liu & Y.Z.Zhang; Camellia borealiyunnanica H.T.Chang; Camellia brevicolumna H.T.Chang, H.S.Liu & Y.Z.Zhang; Camellia brevigyna H.T.Chang; Camellia brevipetiolata H.T.Chang; Camellia chunii H.T.Chang; Camellia heterophylla Hu; Camellia huiliensis H.T.Chang; Camellia jinshajiangica H.T.Chang & S.L.Lee; Camellia kangdianica H.T.Chang, H.S.Liu & G.X.Xiang; Camellia kweichowensis H.T.Chang; Camellia lanosituba H.T.Chang; Camellia oligophlebia H.T.Chang; Camellia paucipetala H.T.Chang; Camellia pentapetala H.T.Chang; Camellia pentaphylacoides H.T.Chang; Camellia pentaphylax H.T.Chang; Camellia phelloderma H.T.Chang, H.S.Liu & Y.Z.Zhang; Camellia stichoclada H.T.Chang; Camellia subliberopetala H.T.Chang; Camellia xichangensis H.T.Chang; Camellia xylocarpa (Hu) H.T.Chang ex H.T.Chang & B.Bartholmew; Desmitus reticulata (Lindl.) Raf.; Thea reticulata (Lindl.) Pierre; Yunnanea xylocarpa Hu

= Camellia reticulata =

Species of flowering plant

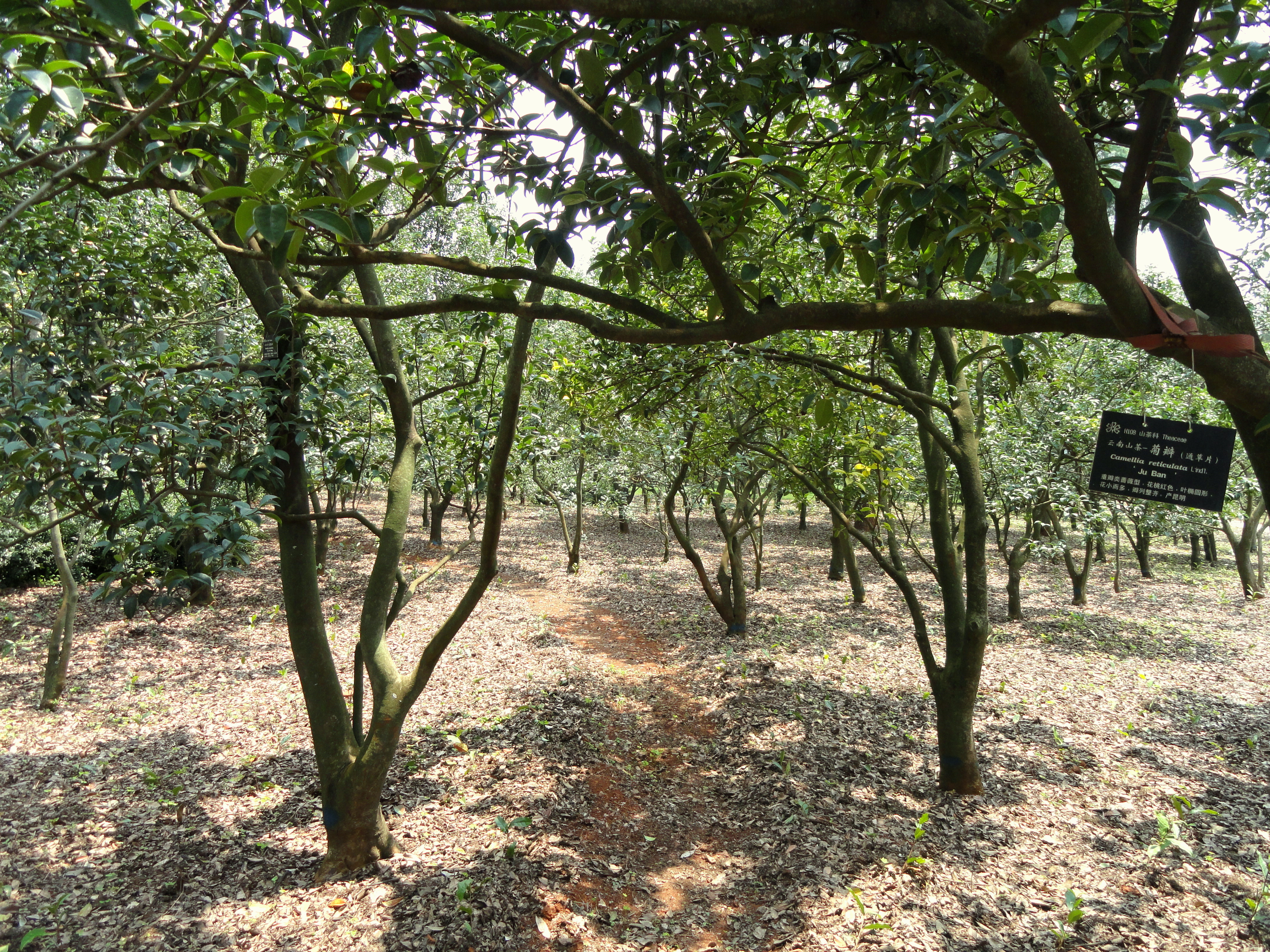

Camellia reticulata (syn. C. heterophylla) is a species of flowering plant in the tea family Theaceae, native to southwestern China, in Yunnan and Sichuan Provinces.

It is a loosely branched shrub or small tree, which can grow up to 10 to 15 meters (33 to 49 ft) in height. The leaves are elliptic to oblong-elliptic, 5–11 centimetres (2.0–4.3 in) long and 4–5.5 centimetres (1.6–2.2 in) wide. The flowers are 7–10 centimetres (2.8–3.9 in) in diameter, or larger in some cultivars, soft-pink to deep-pink and rarely almost white, with 5–7 petals or more in some cultivars, and are produced in sub-terminal or axillary positions on the branch. The fruit is a light brown, three-segmented capsule, about 5 centimetres (2.0 in) in diameter that ripens in the fall This Camellia is very susceptible to cold weather and has a late blooming season; August through October in the southern hemisphere and March through May in the northern hemisphere.

== Symbolism and uses ==
Camellia reticulata is the floral emblem of Yunnan. It has a long history of cultivation, both for tea oil and for its ornamental value.

In 1820, Captain Richard Rawes of the East Indiaman Warren Hastings imported the first reticulata to England, (named 'Captain Rawes'). It remained the only known reticulata cultivated in Europe for over a century.
