= Flora and fauna of Cornwall =

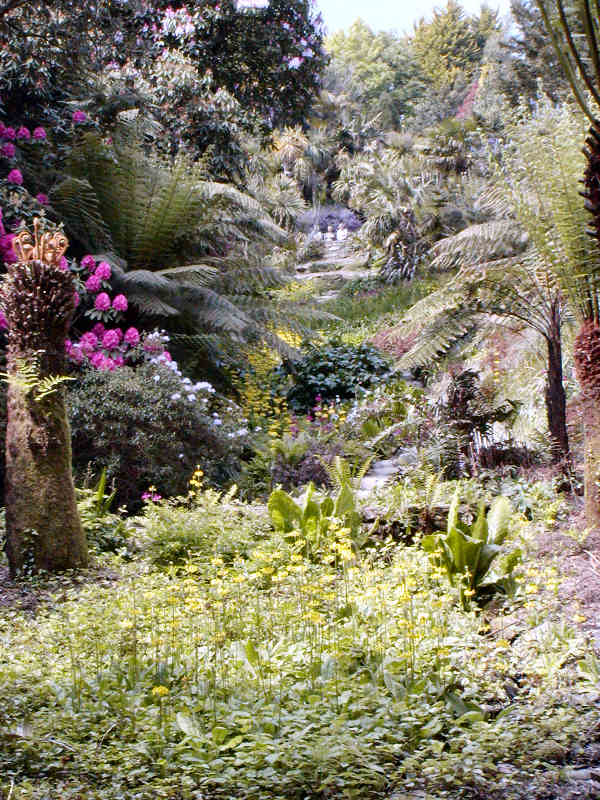
Some of the plants in Trebah garden

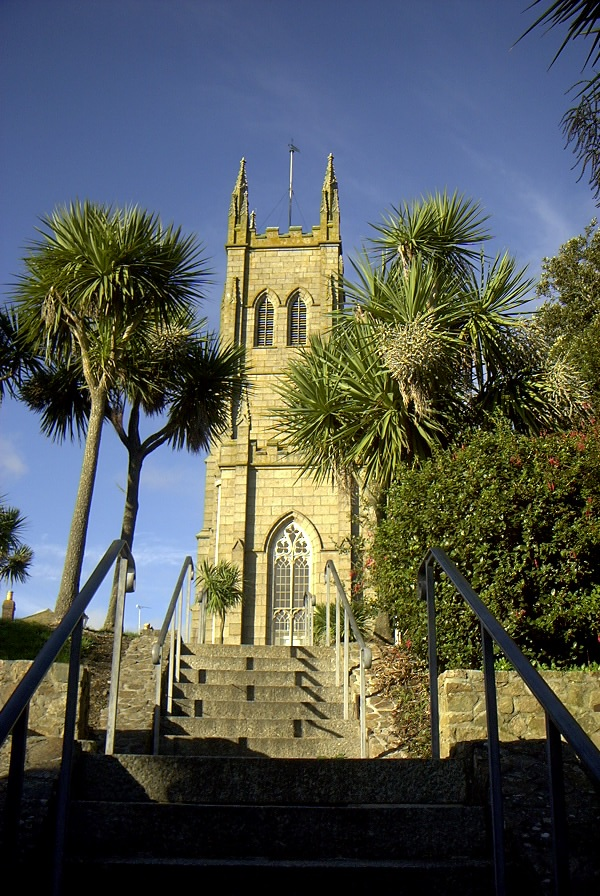
Cornwall is known for its "Cornish palm" (Cordyline australis). These examples are at St Mary's Church, in Penzance.

Cornwall is the county that forms the tip of the southwestern peninsula of England; this area has a mild and warm climate regulated by the Gulf Stream. The mild climate allows rich plant cover, such as palm trees in the far south and west of the county and in the Isles of Scilly, due to sub-tropical conditions in the summer.

On Cornwall's moors and high ground areas the high elevation makes tree cover impossible because of the wind, so these areas are populated by shrubs and bushes such as gorse and heather. Ferns, mosses, liverworts, lichens and fungi can all be found in the county. In the wettest areas of Bodmin Moor, sphagnum or bog moss can be found.

Cornwall is home to many rare flower species, especially at the southern end of the Lizard, due to its unique soil and geology. On the Lizard Peninsula, Cornish heath – the floral emblem of Cornwall – mesembryanthemums, butcher's broom, early meadow grass and a wide range of clovers including the Lizard clover, brookweed and yellow wallpepper can be found. The north coast of Cornwall features maritime grassland, heathland and stunted woodland.

In medieval times there were on royal estates and on those of the Bishop of Exeter a number of deer parks in which fallow deer were contained for hunting. The only episcopal manors with deer parks were Lanner, Pawton and Penryn. At Helston in Trigg (Lanteglos) and at Liskeard were probably the oldest deer parks; they were two of the seven which passed from the Earldom to the Duchy of Cornwall in 1337. Among the seven were two at Liskeard (old and new) and a new park at Helston in Trigg and small parks at Launceston and Trematon; the park at Restormel was probably established by Earl Richard. The then existing ducal parks were disparked by King Henry VIII about 1540 so that they became pasture for cattle. There were also a number of privately owned deer parks, both large and small, e.g. Carn Brea, Polrode, Boconnoc and Mount Edgcumbe.

== Coastal waters ==
The county's coastal waters are home to large populations of seals. Porpoises, whales and sharks are not uncommonly seen.

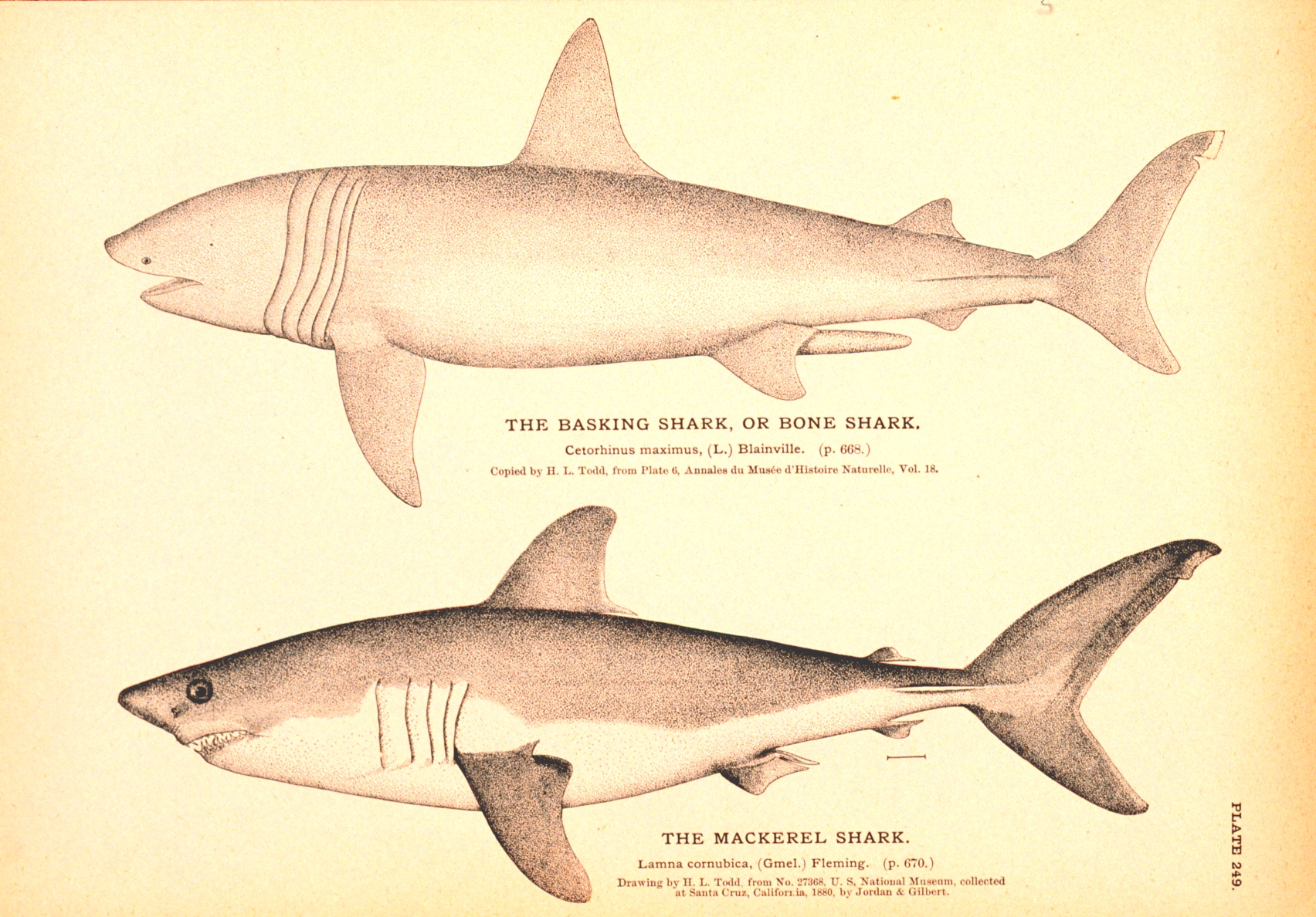
A basking shark and a porbeagle

Porbeagles inhabit the coastal waters but the etymology of the word is obscure. A common suggestion is that it combines "porpoise" and "beagle", referencing this shark's shape and tenacious hunting habits. Another is that it is derived from the Cornish porth, meaning "harbour", and bugel, meaning "shepherd". The Oxford English Dictionary states that the word was either borrowed from Cornish or formed from a Cornish first element with the English "beagle"; however, none of the proposed Cornish root words are fully satisfactory. Squalus cornubicus (Gmelin, 1789); Squalus cornubiensis (Pennant, 1812) and Lamna cornubica are other Latin names for the porbeagle.

Swanpool is the only location in the British Isles in which the bryozoan Victorella pavida is found.

== Cliffs, estuaries and riversides ==
The sea cliffs host many marine bird species with the red-billed chough recently returning to the county after a long absence. This rare bird appears on the Cornish coat of arms and is the county animal of Cornwall. The nominate subspecies and smallest form, is endemic to the British Isles, where it was restricted to Ireland, the Isle of Man, and the far west of Wales and Scotland, until it recently recolonised Cornwall after an absence of many years.

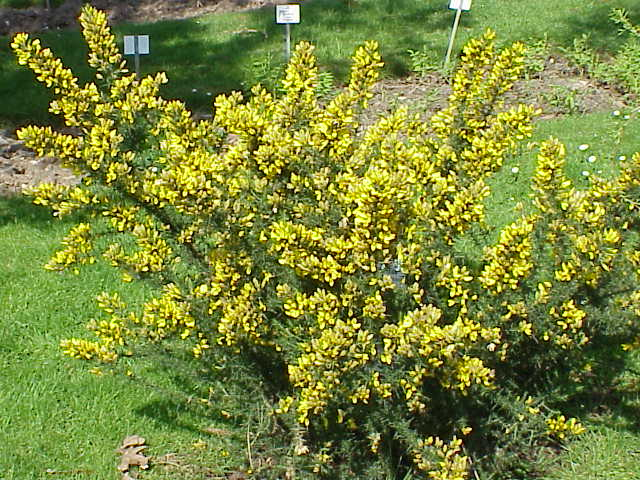
Ulex europaeus (gorse)

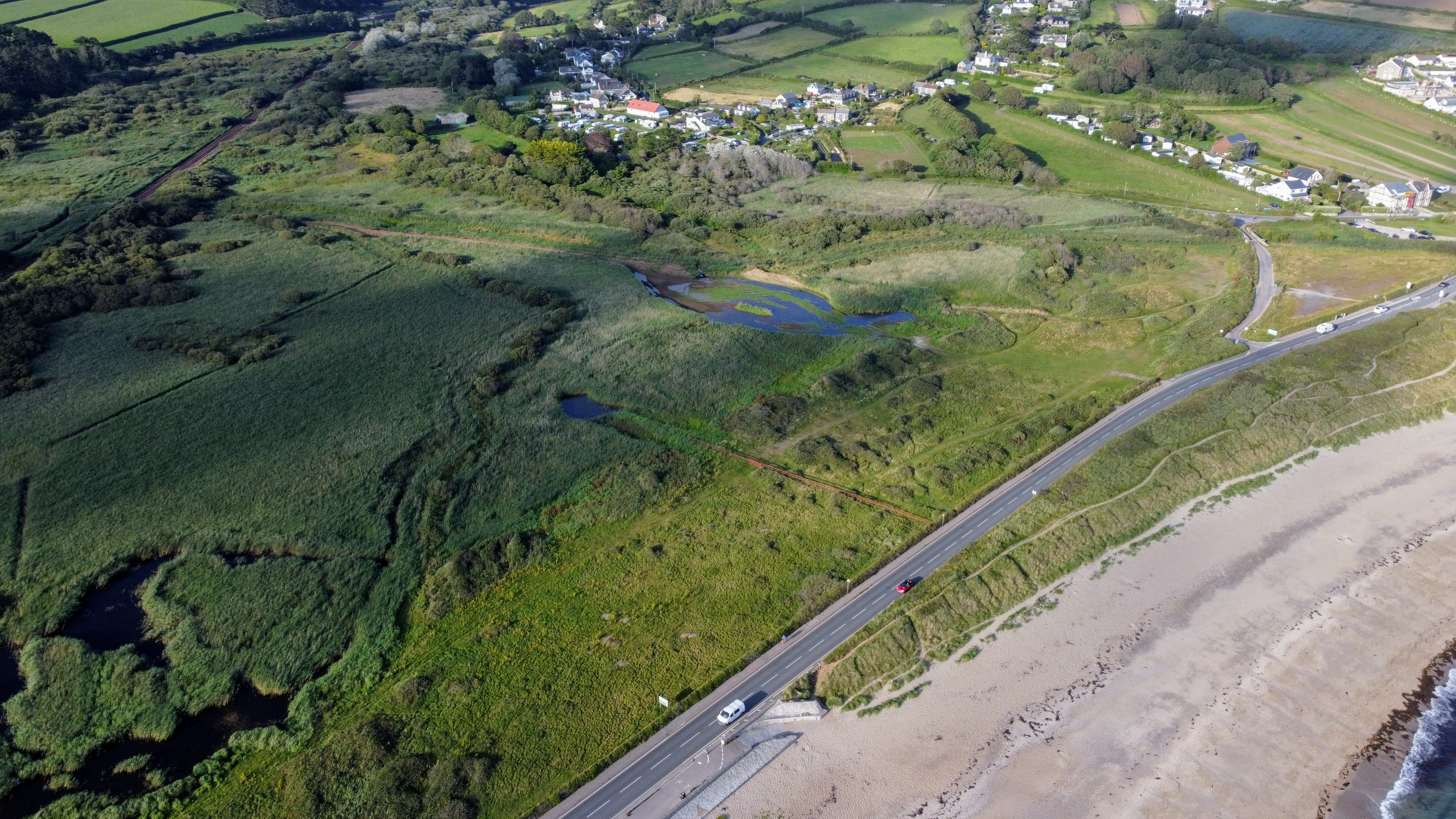
Aerial view of Marazion Marsh

The tidal estuaries along the coasts contain large numbers of wading birds, while marshland bird species frequently settle in the bogs and mires inland. Bodmin Moor is a breeding ground for species such as lapwing, snipe and curlew. On and around the rivers, sand martins and kingfishers are often seen, while after a decline in the 1960s and 1970s, Eurasian otters have been returning in large numbers. The Camel Valley is one of the habitats for otters. Bude Canal offers an ideal habitat for water voles, although the population is declining because of habitat degradation and pollution, like in other parts of the country.

The Mousehole Wild Bird Hospital and Sanctuary is a wildlife hospital based near Mousehole. The hospital was founded in 1928 by Dorothy and Phyllis Yglesias and became famous following the Torrey Canyon disaster. The Cornish Seal Sanctuary, in Gweek, was founded in 1958 and is a sanctuary for injured seal pups.

=== The Tamar Valley ===
==== Tamar Valley AONB ====
The Tamar Valley Area of Outstanding Natural Beauty covers around 195 km^{2} (75 sq mi) around the lower Tamar (below Launceston) and its tributaries the Tavy and the Lynher. It was first proposed in 1963, but was not designated until 1995.

==== The Tamar Otter and Wildlife Centre, North Petherwin (now permanently closed) ====
The Tamar Otter and Wildlife Centre has European and Asian short-clawed otters and a medium-sized duck pond, a nature trail including snowy and barn owls and other birds along it. It has a fish pond, a restaurant area and a gift shop. The nature trail is full of wildlife such as fallow and muntjac deer, peacocks and the not quite so English wallabies. As well as this, the nature trail has a waterfall falling down from the top of an old quarry and every few years different segments of the woodlands are coppiced. Some of the wood from this scheme is piled up in random areas of the woodlands as it makes a perfect home for badgers, hedgehogs and many creepy crawlies.

== The Lizard Peninsula ==
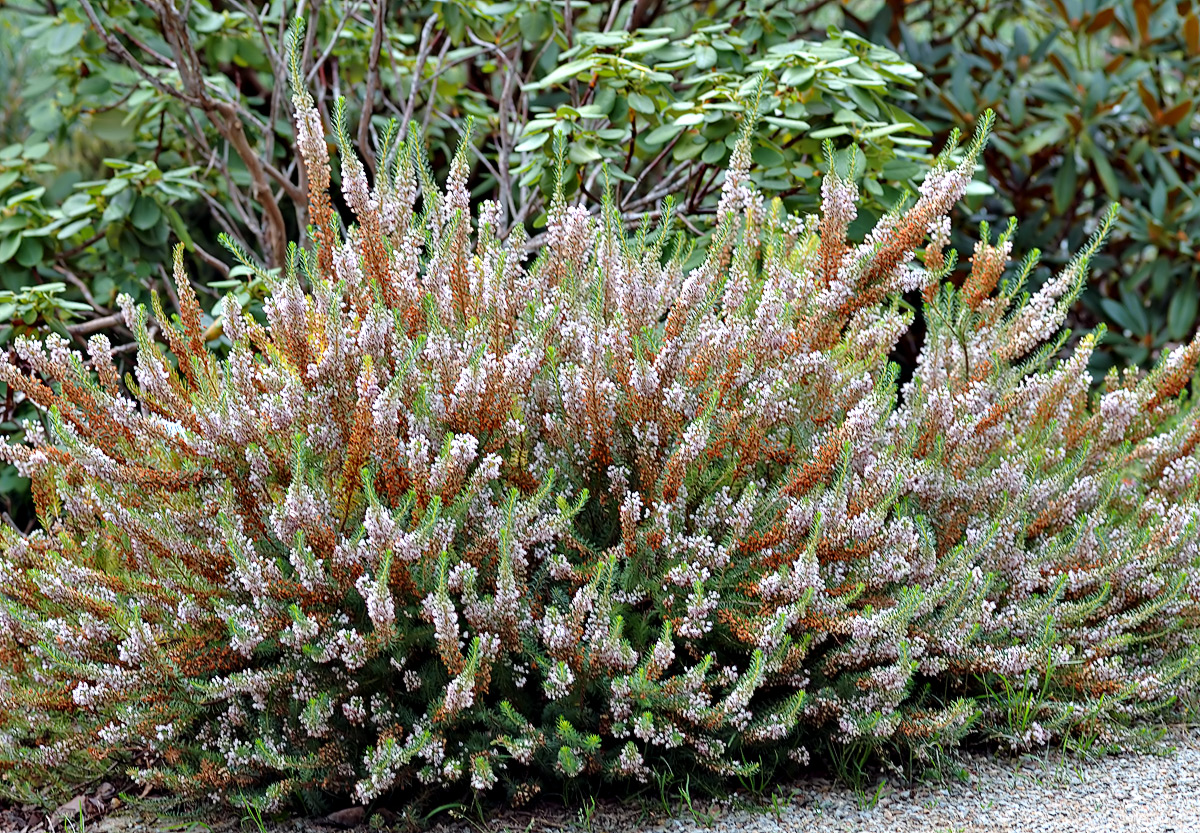
Cornish heath

Several nature sites exist on the Lizard Peninsula; Predannack nature reserve, Mullion Island, Goonhilly Downs and the National Seal sanctuary at Gweek. It is also home to one of England's rarest breeding birds – the red-billed chough. This species of crow, distinctive due to its red beak and legs, as well as the haunting "chee-aw" call, began breeding on Lizard in 2002. This followed a concerted effort by the Cornish Chough Project in conjunction with DEFRA and the RSPB.

The Lizard contains some of the most specialised flora of any area in Britain, including many Red Data Book plant species. Of particular note is the Cornish heath, Erica vagans, that occurs in abundance here, but is found nowhere else in Britain. It is also one of the few places where the rare formicine ant (the narrow-headed ant) can be found.

The Lizard district has a local organisation, the Lizard Field Club, whose members have studied the natural history of the area since 1953.

== South coast ==
At Polruan the gorse covered south facing cliffs between Polruan and Polperro provide habitats for the goldfinch, yellowhammer and stonechat in particular. Reptile species include the slowworm and the adder. The latter is particularly numerous.

Marine life includes the basking shark which have been known to enter the harbour. In 1972 a particularly large example was seen at the end of Polruan Quay; it was longer than the width of the quay. Other fish that may be found in local waters including the estuary include: bass, wrasse (four varieties), seahorse, pipe fish, pollock, coalfish, flounder, plaice, conger eel, European eel, dragonet, red gurnard, grey gurnard, blenny (shanney), bullhead, burbot, butterfish, sand-eel, salmon, sea trout, garfish, mackerel, angler fish (incorrectly named in restaurants "monk fish"), dab, whitebait, scad (horse mackerel), shad, herring, turbot, pouting, poor cod and rockling.

== Isles of Scilly ==
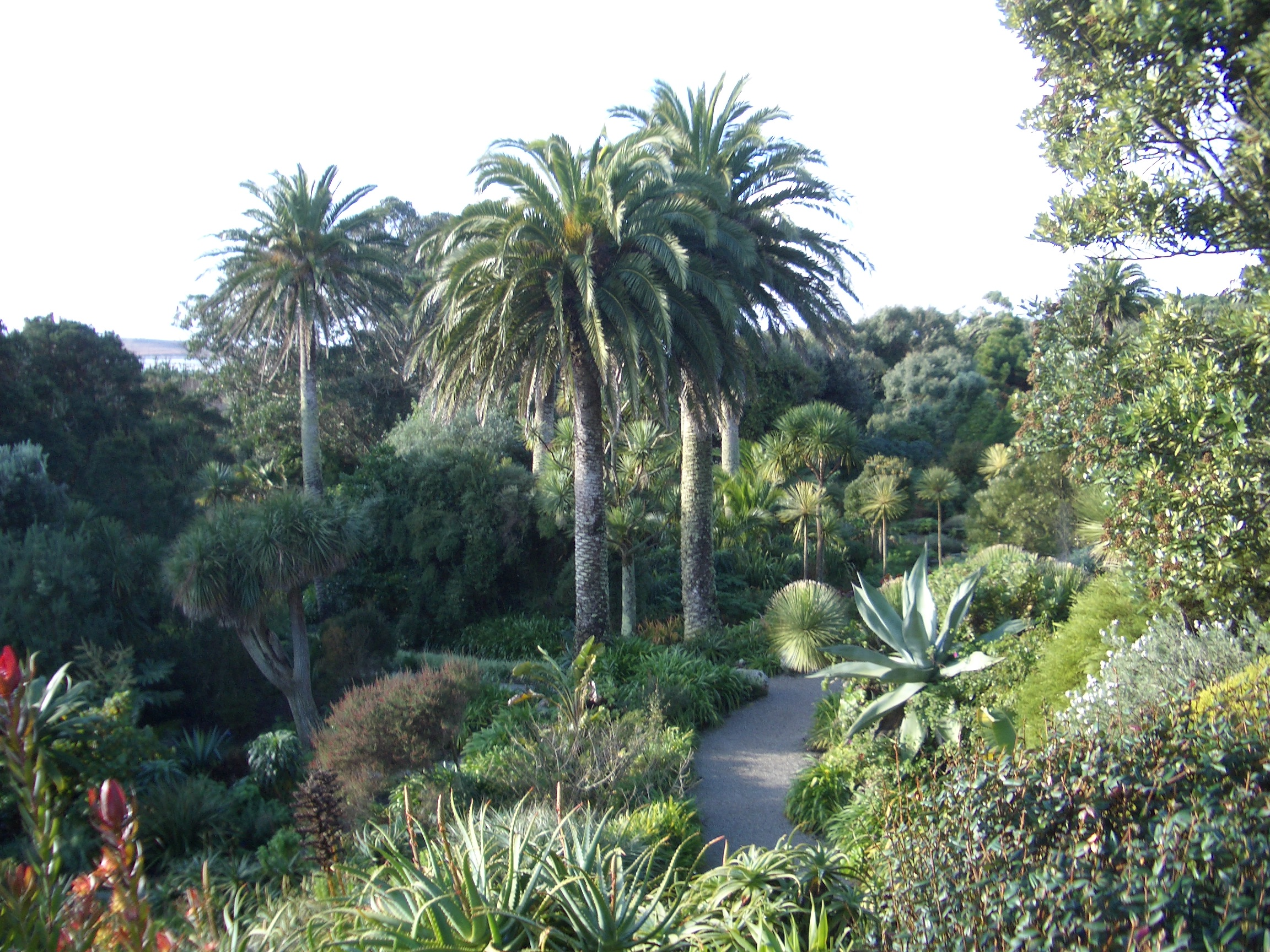
True palm trees at Tresco Abbey Gardens in the Isles of Scilly

Because of the Gulf Stream, the climate of Scilly is particularly mild so sub-tropical plants can grow there, including true palm trees. Scilly is the first landing for many migrant birds, including extreme rarities from North America and Siberia. Scilly is situated far into the Atlantic Ocean, so many North American vagrant birds will make first European landfall in the archipelago.

Scilly is responsible for many firsts for Britain, and is particularly good at producing vagrant American passerines. If an extremely rare bird turns up, the island will see a significant increase in numbers of birders.

== Cultural significance ==
The Cornish national flower is variously said to be either broom, furze (gorse), rhododendron, or Cornish heath. The Cornish national tree is the sessile oak, known in Cornwall as the Cornish oak.

Thrift (Armeria maritima) was chosen by the plant conservation charity Plantlife as the "county flower" of the Isles of Scilly in 2002.

Title	Symbol	Picture
Subnational tree	Cornish elm (Ulmus minor stricta)	
Subnational flower	Spring squill (Scilla verna, floral emblem of Cornwall)	
Subnational bird	Cornish chough/red-billed chough (Pyrrhocorax pyrrhocorax)	
Subnational animal	European rabbit (Oryctolagus cuniculus)	
Subnational fruit	Cornish Gilliflower (a cultivar of Malus domestica)	
Subnational vegetable	Collard (a cultivar of Brassica oleracea)	
Subnational crop	Potato (Solanum tuberosum)	

== Flora ==
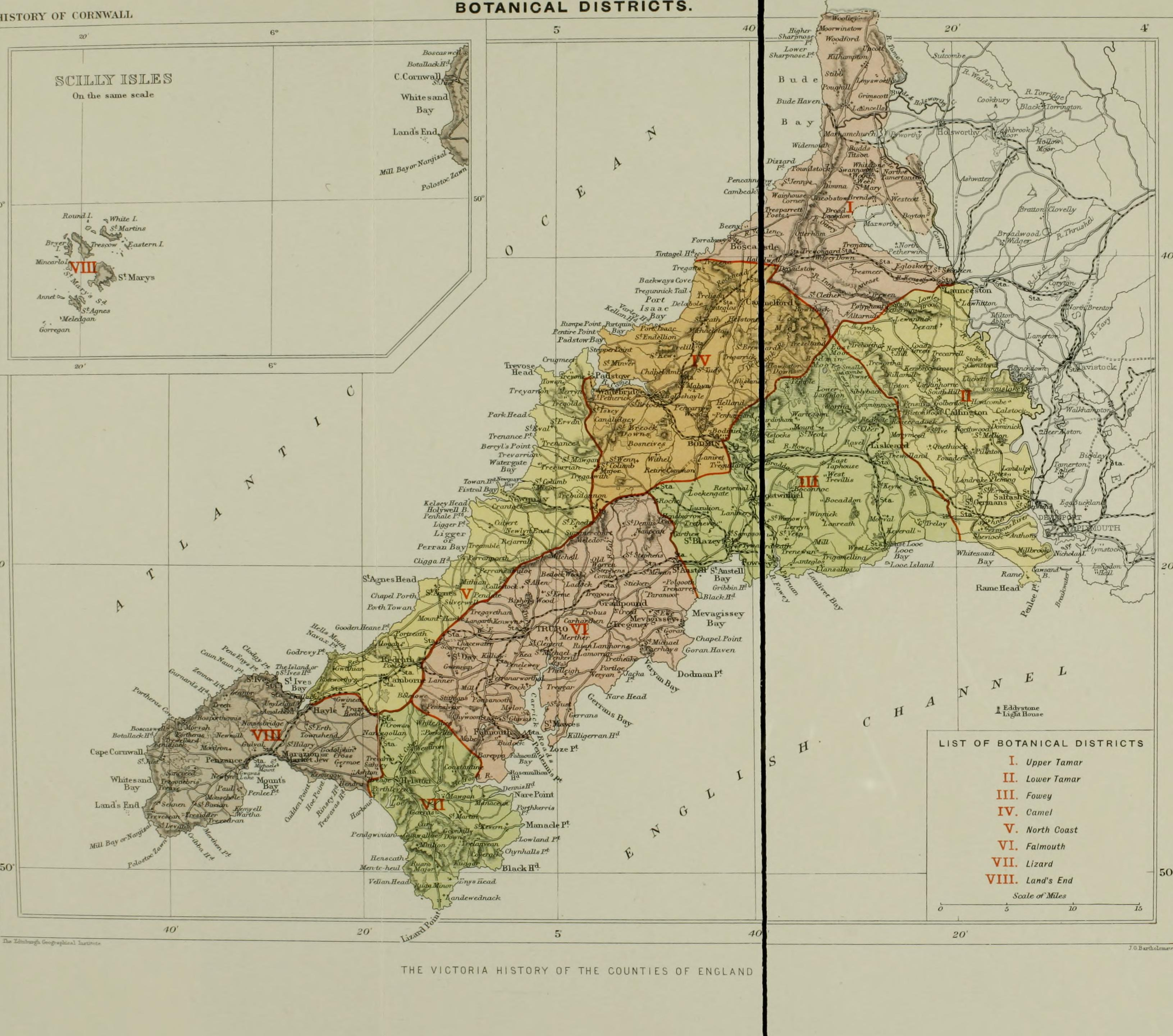
Map of Cornwall showing the botanical districts

Botanists divide Cornwall and Scilly into two vice-counties: West (1) and East (2): the boundary runs irregularly from Truro to Wadebridge.

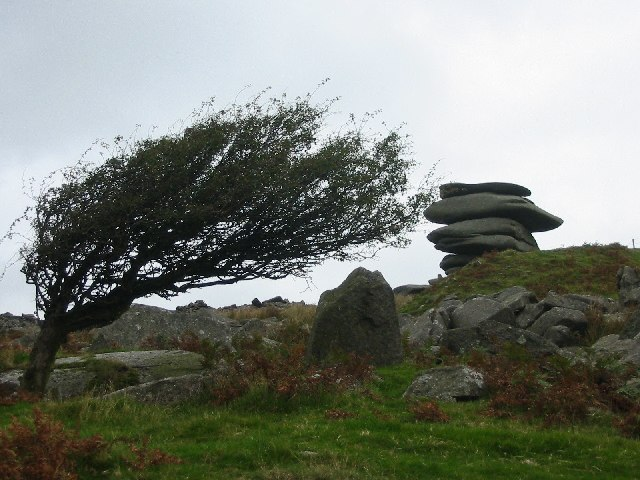
Moorland tree showing characteristic shape caused by the effect of the prevailing wind

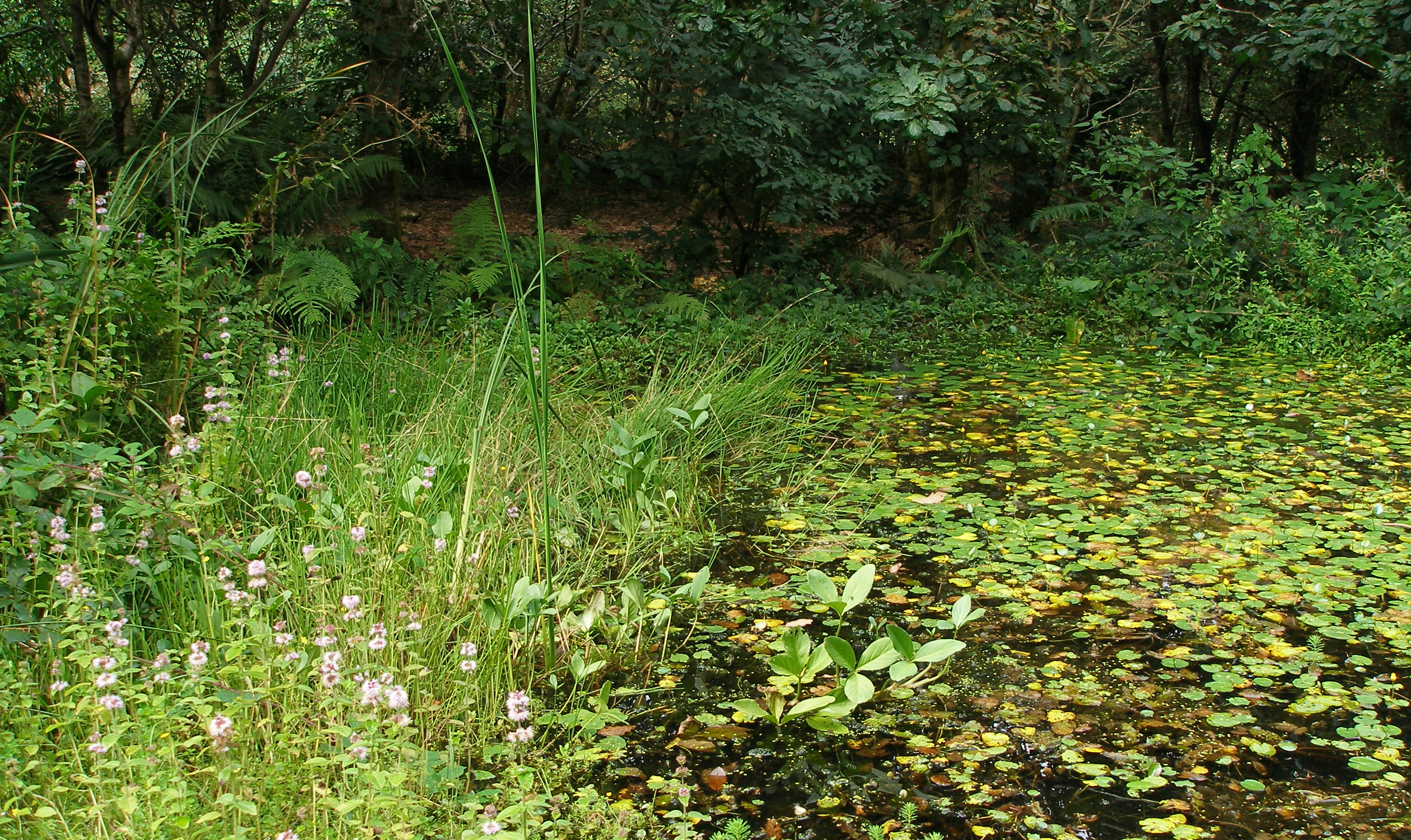
One of the ponds at Five Acres, Allet

The standard flora is F. Hamilton Davey's Flora of Cornwall (1909). Davey was assisted by A. O. Hume and he thanks Hume, his companion on excursions in Cornwall and Devon, for help in the compilation and publication of that flora. Davey gives an account of all the reports of Cornish plants from 1576 until his own time and divides the county into eight districts. The Isles of Scilly are covered by the flora but not very thoroughly: there is a good flora of Scilly by J. E. Lousley. Edgar Thurston and Chambré C. Vigurs published a supplement to the flora in 1922 and in 1981 L. J. Margetts and R. W. David published A Review of the Cornish Flora (1980). Pool: Institute of Cornish Studies ISBN 0-903686-34-1. A supplement to this for 1980–1991 by Margetts and K. L. Spurgin appeared in 1991.

Another useful source of botanical information is The Flowers of the Field, by C. A. Johns (1853): it treats the country as a whole (with a supplement on grasses), but Johns was a Cornishman and very knowledgeable about its flora and fauna. The Rev Charles Alexander Johns, F.L.S. (1811–1974) is also responsible for calling the attention of botanists to the very specialised flora of the Lizard in A Week at the Lizard, 1848, written when he was a teacher at Helston Grammar School.

Plants of the environs of Tintagel

"Within easy reach of Tintagel at least 385 varieties of flowers, 30 kinds of grasses, and 16 of ferns can be found ... a 'happy hunting ground' for botanists" and a list of 39 of the rarest is given. (Contribution by E.M.S. to W. J. C. Armstrong's Rambler's Guide, 1935.)

=== Botanic gardens ===
There are botanic gardens at the Eden Project, the Lost Gardens of Heligan, and at Trebah and Tresco Abbey Gardens on the Isles of Scilly.

Araucaria araucana derives its popular name of "monkey puzzle tree" from what happened when a young specimen of it at Pencarrow was shown to a group of friends of the owner; one of them made the remark "It would puzzle a monkey to climb that"; as the species had no existing popular name, first "monkey puzzler", then "monkey puzzle" stuck.

=== Gardening ===
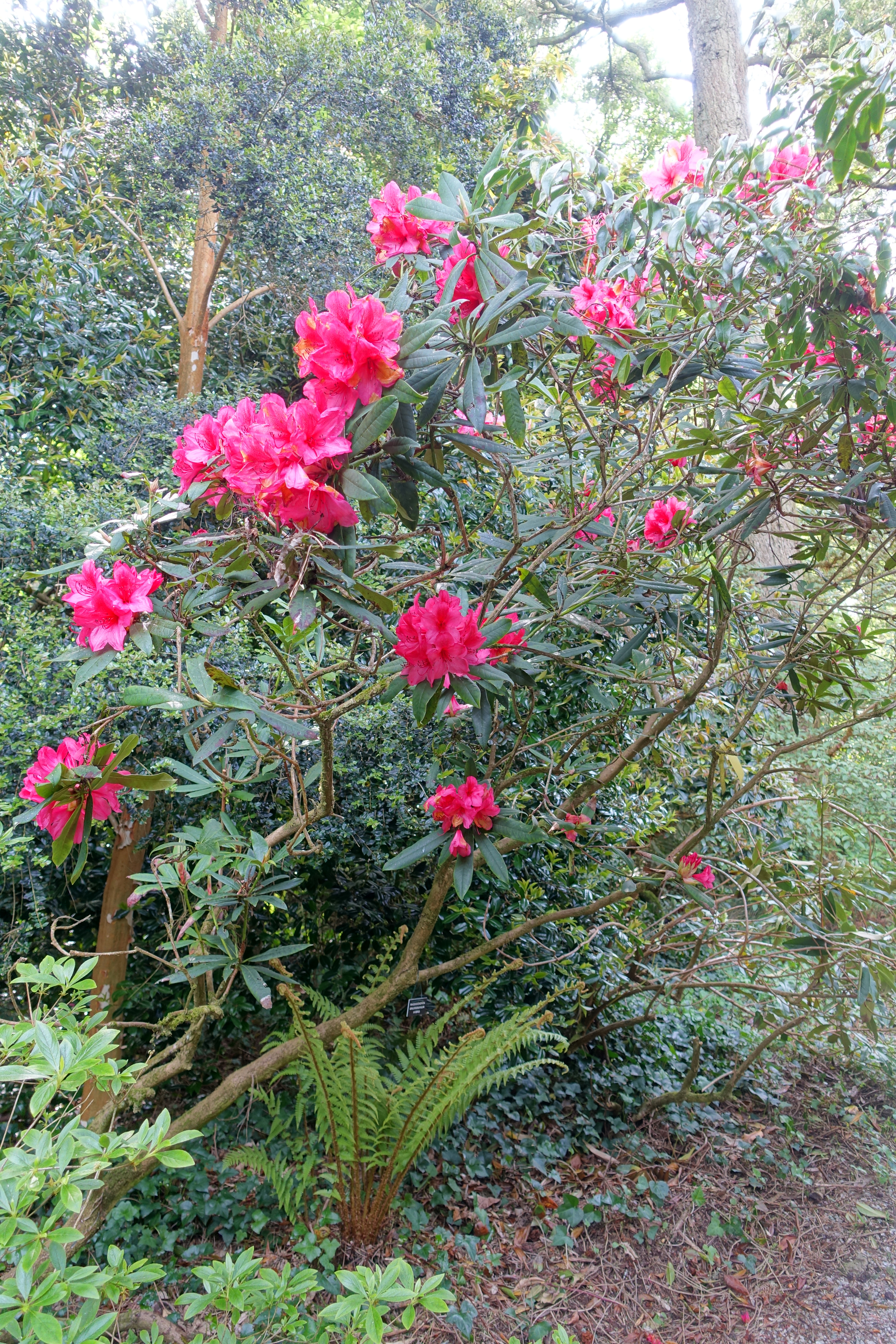
A Rhododendron griersonianum hybrid at Trengwainton

It is probable that no area of the world has the conditions for growing such a great variety of plants. Gardeners in Devon and Cornwall supported plant collectors such as Forest, Wilson and Kingdon Ward by taking infinite trouble in caring for seedlings and extended their gardens into woods to provide the right conditions. Plants seen in Cornish gardens have encouraged upcountry gardeners to grow such plants as Magnolia campbellii. Some plants (e.g. Rhododendron macabeanum) can grow larger in Cornwall than they can in their native habitats. Before the period of tourism Cornish gardens were designed for spring effect; however the tourists who come in summer want to see magnificence at that time of year so the gardeners have adapted accordingly, though a good effect is still made in spring. Wind shelter is an important precondition for the site of a good garden, particularly near the coast. Monterey pine, sycamore and ash are good for providing such shelter. The majority of soils are acid and full of accumulated leaf mould. Water draining from the granite moorlands also raises the acidity. Most of the great gardens are near the coast where the climate is milder and with higher rainfall than further inland. Rhododendrons flourish particularly well, both species and the hybrids which gardeners have created such as 'Cornish Cross' and 'Penjerrick'. Plants from South America have also flourished well; these include the Crinodendrons and Embothrium coccineum.

The rectory and vicarage gardens of Cornwall are highly varied. Some are large enough to allow for tree planting and both formal and informal garden of this kind exist. Some have been cared for by noted horticulturists such as Arthur Boscawen of Ludgvan and others by amateur gardeners such as Bernard Walke of St Hilary where a former vicar had planted an avenue of beech trees. Joseph Hunkin, Bishop of Truro, was a keen gardener; he was commemorated by a garden in the cathedral close and a shrub donated to every parish. His articles on gardening topics were collected and published as From a Cornish Bishop's Garden in 2001.

=== Trees ===
The Darley Oak is an oak tree which grows near Darleyford on the edge of Bodmin Moor. This ancient tree is thought to be at least 1,000 years old, and a considerable amount of legends take it as their core.

==== Elms ====
===== Cornish Elm =====
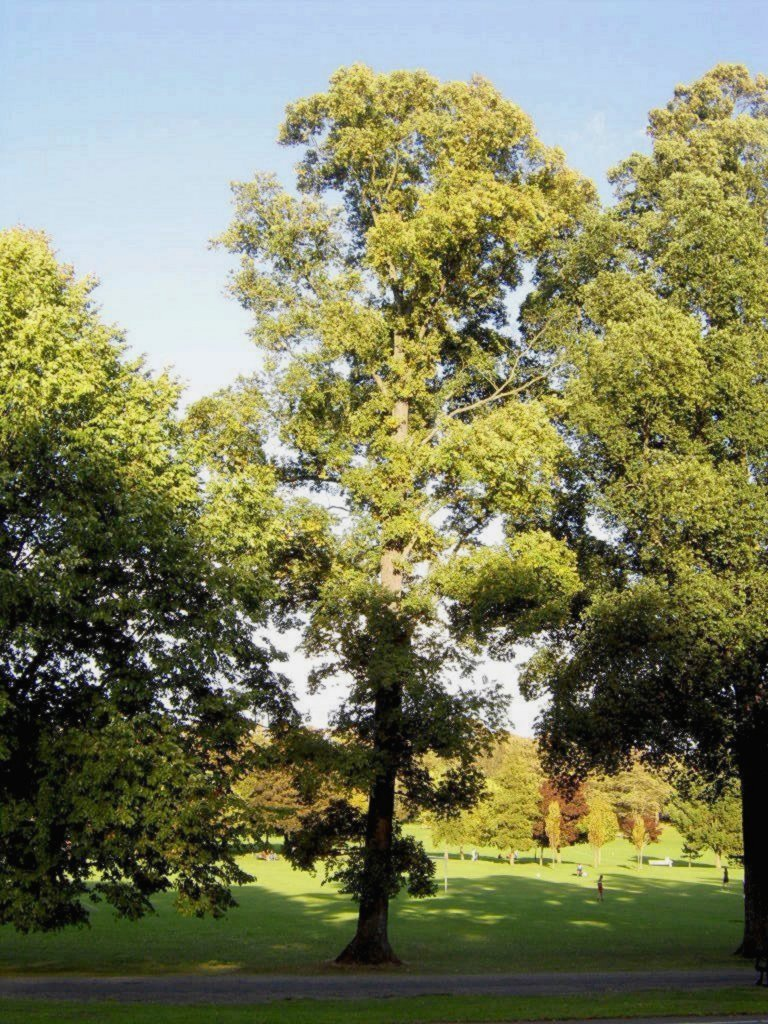
Cornish elm in Preston Park, Brighton, (felled before 2008)

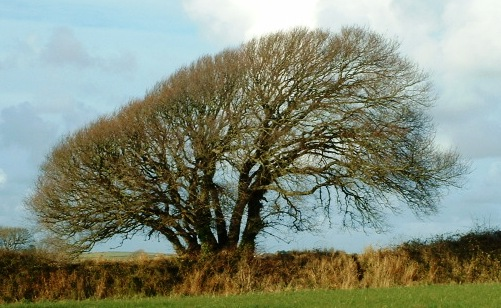
Davey Elm at Trenance Farm (showing effect of wind on its growth)

The Cornish Elm was once common in Cornwall but can now only be found outside Cornwall. The origin of the Cornish Elm in the UK remains a matter of contention; commonly assumed to have been introduced from Brittany by man, it is also considered possible that it may have survived the ice ages on lands to the south of Cornwall long since lost to the sea. Certainly, its current distribution owes much to man's activities. The tree was traditionally considered the best choice for providing shelter along the Cornish coast; moreover its timber was much prized for its strength, and commonly used in wheel and wagon construction.

===== Davey Elm =====
The Davey Elm (Ulmus × hollandica 'Daveyi') is an English cultivar of unknown specific origin, generally restricted to the valleys of Cornwall. Its apparent south-west England provenance, along with its foliage and habit, suggest that it may be a hybrid of wych elm and Cornish Elm.

==== Fruit trees ====
Cornish Aromatic

Cornish Aromatic is an apple cultivar with a crisp, nut-like aromatic flavour that was first recorded in Cornwall in 1813.

Cornish Gilliflower

The Cornish Gilliflower cultivar of apple is so named as it was found in Truro, Cornwall, around 1800, the word "gilliflower" being a corruption of a French word giroflier meaning clove, believed to be a reference to its odour. The cultivar was brought to the attention of commercial growers in 1813.

Dufflin

Dufflin is an old variety of cider apple from Cornwall. It was included in orchard trials by Long Ashton Research Station in 1957.

Hocking's Green

This is an apple variety which originated in Coad's Green.

King Byerd

The King Byerd is a Cornish cultivar of apple. It is a heavy cropping, large fruit, suitable for culinary or desert use. Harvested from late October.

Kea Plum

The Kea Plum is a damson-like variety deriving its name from the parish of Kea.

=== Other Cornish varieties of plants ===
The Cornish heath (Erica vagans) is found only on the Lizard and has been recognised as the floral emblem of Cornwall although it has been reported to be found in Fermanagh, according to W. Keble Martin. In recent years daffodils have been popular on the annual Saint Piran's day march on Perran Sands, although the plants are donated by a local daffodil grower and the daffodil is already considered to be the national flower of Wales.

As part of a 2002 marketing campaign, the plant conservation charity Plantlife chose thrift (Armeria maritima) as the "county flower" of the Isles of Scilly.

The Cornish eyebright (Euphrasia vigursii) is found on heathland in Cornwall and south Devon.

The Cornish moneywort (Sibthorpia europaea) is found locally in south-west England, Wales and the south of Ireland; in the rest of southern England it is rare.

Cornish path-moss (Ditrichum cornubicum), discovered in 1963 at Lanner by Jean Paton.

The distribution of least adder's tongue in Britain is restricted to one small area of coastal heath on St Agnes, Isles of Scilly. It grows in short turf on Wingletang Downs where some colonies are suffering from an increase of competitive grasses, gorse (Ulex europaeus) and bramble (Rubus fruticosus).

Cornish palm is a local common name for the monocot tree Cordyline australis endemic to New Zealand.

== See also ==
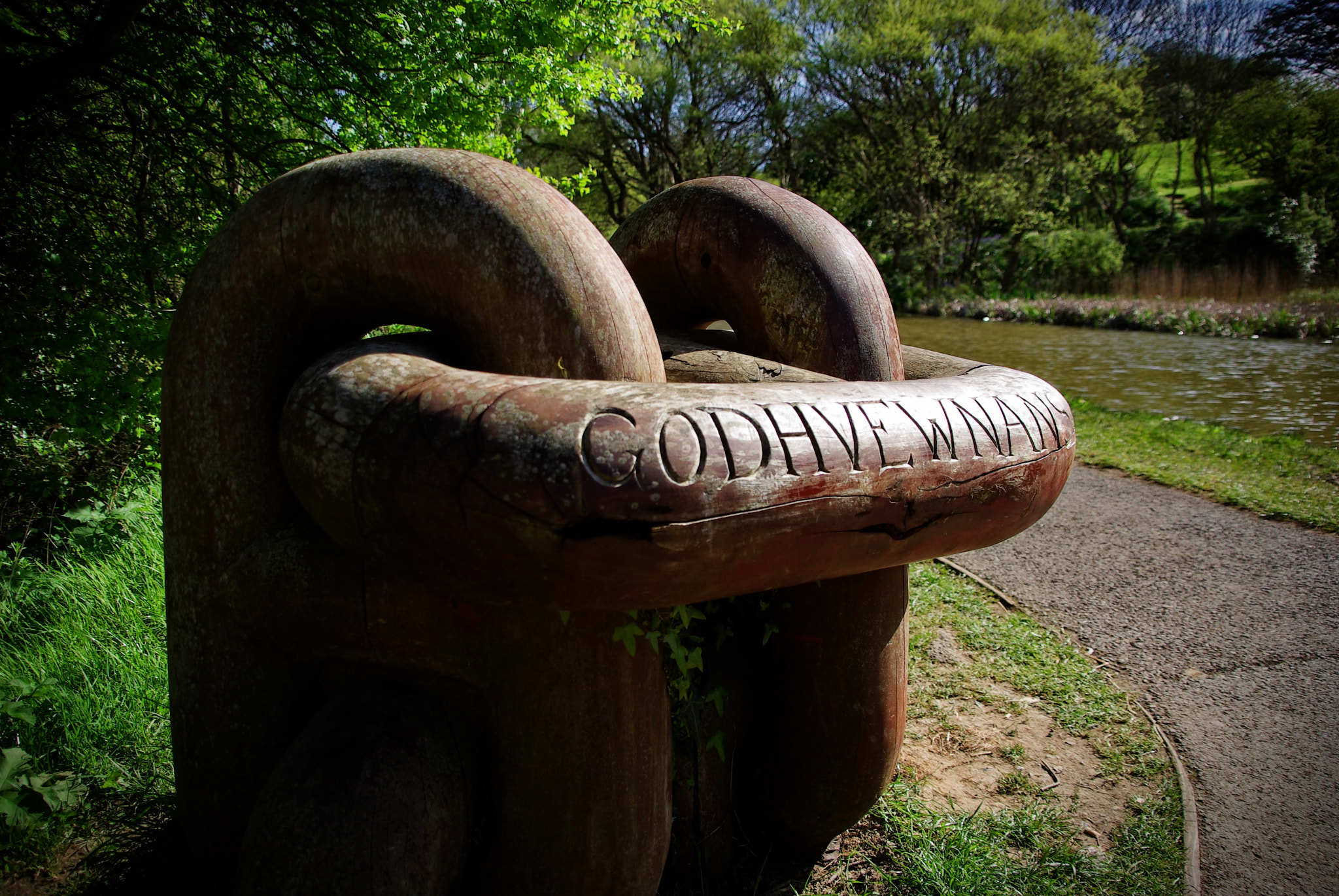
"Godhvewnans" near the Bude Canal

- Birds of Cornwall
- Cornish hedge
- Cornish Rex (cat)
- Geography of Cornwall
- Geology of Cornwall
- List of Special Areas of Conservation in Cornwall
- List of Cornish scientists and inventors
- List of gardens in Cornwall
- Jean Paton, a British botanist, bryologist and botanical illustrator who wrote many books on the bryology of the United Kingdom and the flora of Cornwall

== References and bibliography ==
- Bere, Rennie (1982) The Nature of Cornwall. Buckingham: Barracuda Books
- Henderson, Charles (1935) Essays in Cornish History; ed. by A. L. Rowse and M. I. Henderson. London: Oxford University Press; An historical survey of Cornish woodlands; pp. 135–151
- Rodd, E. H. (1864) A List of British Birds as a Guide to the Ornithology of Cornwall. London, 1864; 2nd ed. 1869.
- Rodd, E. H. (1880) The Birds of Cornwall and the Scilly Islands; edited by J. E. Harting. London
