= Entierro =

In Chilean folklore the entierros (lit. "burrowing") are legendary treasures buried in different locations by different motives. The identity of the alleged burrowers vary from case to case, sometimes being indigenous peoples, pirates and privateers like Francis Drake or the Jesuits. A significant number of the entierro legends relate to the Spanish Conquest of Chile in the 16th century. Associated to this there is a significant folklore on how to unearth the entierros.

Some people believe that a nocturnal bird called Alicanto can show to treasure hunters the location of entierros.

Patagua trees are said to signal or guide people to an entierro.

== Particular entierros ==
=== Colonial era entierros ===
In the far north of Chile a tale says that because Francis Drake feared falling prisoner to the Spanish he buried his treasure near Arica. Further south in Quintero is Cueva del Pirata (lit. "Cave of the Pirate") which is also associated with a treasure of Francis Drake.

In Carelmapu an entierro is said to have been left by the Spanish in an effort to hide valuables from Dutch invaders that sacked the settlement in 1643.

During the Suppression of the Society of Jesus in 1767 folklore says Jesuits of buried their valuables near their confiscated estate in Ocoa. By some accounts the buried treasure was once found but nothing was extracted since the vault proved resistant to dynamite. Another saying tells that those who seek to recover the treasure become cursed.

=== Post-colonial and undated entierros ===
Also associated with the Jesuits was an entierro said to exist at a large rock known as Piedra del Padre in Cajón del Maipo. The rock was said to resemble a priest. Allegedly the rock was blown up with explosives in an attempt to retrieve the treasure but nothing was found.

One story about an entierro is set during the Chilean War of Independence. Reportedly in the aftermath of the patriot defeat at the Battle of Rancagua (1814) some patrician families gathered their valuables in an ox cart to have them evacuated to Mendoza across the Andes. It is said that the cart had only reached Laguna de Aculeo when the Spanish caught up with it. To avoid capture of the treasure, the driver hit the oxen with the spike of his picana making them plunge towards the centre of the lake where the cart and the treasure then sank and were lost in the lake's mud.

Another entierro is said to exist in Laguna de los Cristales in the Andes in the commune of Rengo. The entierro is said to have come into being when an arriero sought shelter near the lake amidst a snow storm. While he was sleeping, the waters rose and brought him and his mules to the bottom of the lake. According to folklore, the mules can still be seen at the bottom of the lake on sunny days. In some versions the arriero and his mules can occasionally be seen getting out of the lake and onto a path.

== See also ==
- Carbunclo
- City of the Caesars
- Cueva de los Pincheira
- Robinson Crusoe Island
