= Bulbella =

Scientific classification
- Kingdom: Animalia
- Phylum: Bryozoa
- Class: Gymnolaemata
- Order: Ctenostomatida
- Family: Victorellidae
- Genus: Bulbella; Braem, 1951

Genus of aquatic invertebrates

Bulbella is a genus of bryozoa belonging to the family Victorellidae. The genus' one species, Bulbella abscondita, was first described from Martha's Vineyard in the United States, but has also been recorded from Italy. It can potentially be confused with Victorella pavida. Its larvae brood externally.
