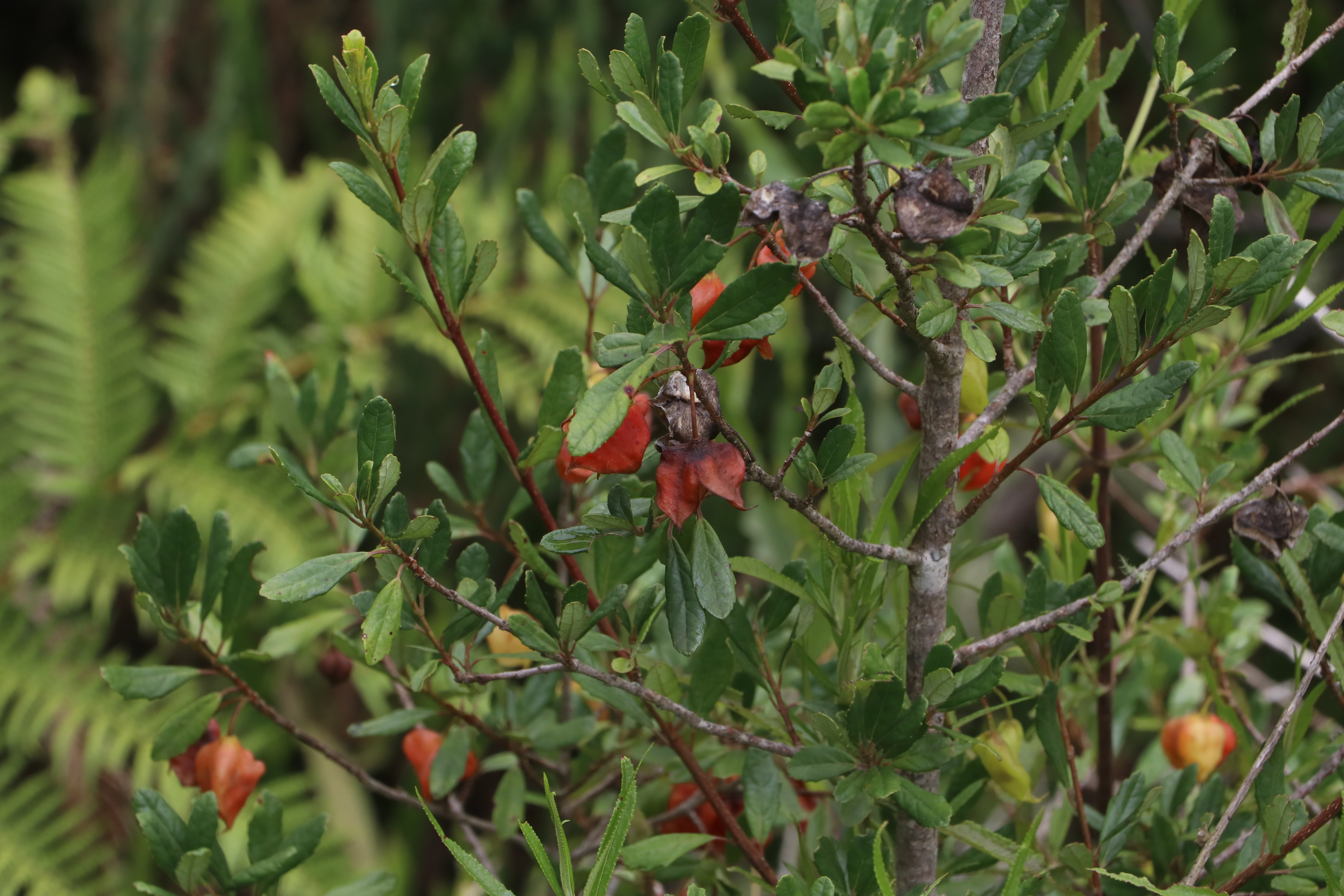
- An individual of the species Crinodendron brasiliense
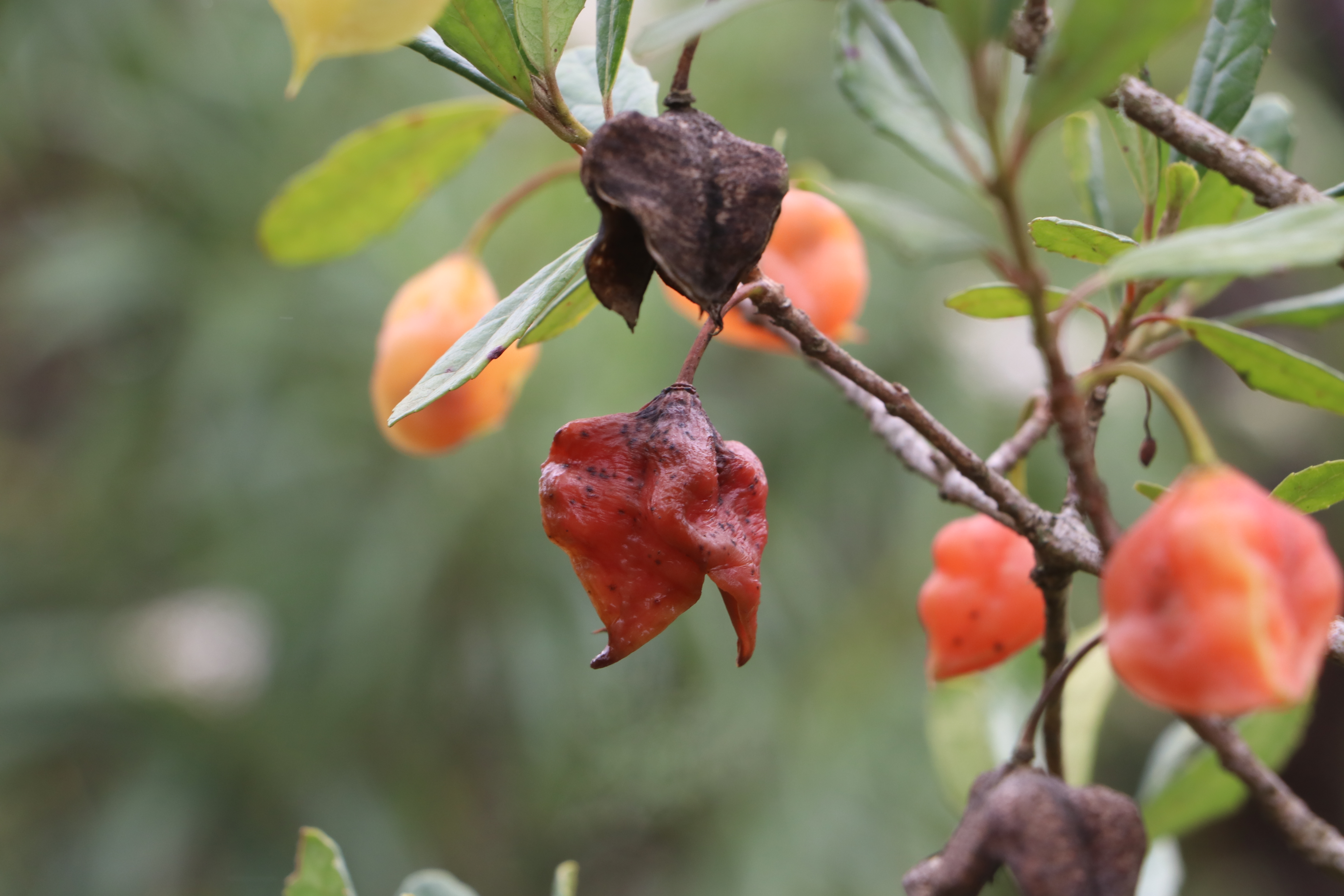
- Fruits of Crinodendron brasiliense

Scientific classification
- Kingdom: Plantae
- Clade: Tracheophytes
- Clade: Angiosperms
- Clade: Eudicots
- Clade: Rosids
- Order: Oxalidales
- Family: Elaeocarpaceae
- Genus: Crinodendron
- Species: C. brasiliense

Binomial name
- Crinodendron brasiliense Reitz & L.B.Sm.

- Distribution of Crinodendron brasiliense (Southern Brazil)

= Crinodendron brasiliense =

Species of flowering plant endemic to Brazil

Crinodendron brasiliense, known as the cinzeiro, is an evergreen shrub to tree in the family Elaeocarpaceae. It is endemic to Brazil, growing only in the Serra Geral mountain range, specifically within Santa Catarina. It has the narrowest distribution of all Crinodendron species and is classified as an endangered species.

== Description ==
Crinodendron brasiliense is a shrub or tree reaching up to 14 metres (46 ft) in height and having a trunk up to 150 centimetres (59 in) in diameter. Leaves alternate on each side of the stem, usually grouped at the ends of branches. The leaves are dark green above and a lighter green below, with a lanceolate shape, toothed edges, and acute apex. The flowers are hermaphroditic, solitary (not part of an inflorescence), axillary, and white. Pedicels range from 3–6 cm (1.2–2.4 in) long. Fruits are reddish when mature and have capsules with 3 valves. A recent study found the narrow distribution and small population size of the species might be linked to its low germination rate (0.003 to 0.004).

== Derivation of scientific name ==
The Latin generic name Crinodendron is a compound of the Ancient Greek words κρίνον (krínon) "lily" and δένδρον (dendrón) "tree", the "lily" element being inspired by the white-flowered C. patagua. The specific name brasiliense refers to the country the species was discovered (Brazil). The genus Crinodendron is small, containing only four species.

== Common names in Brazil ==
The plant has the name 'cinzeiro' (ashtray) or 'cinzeiro-patagua', an allusion to the fact that the species produces a lot of ash (low heat efficiency) when burned.
