= Laguna de los Cristales =

Lake in the Andes of Central Chile

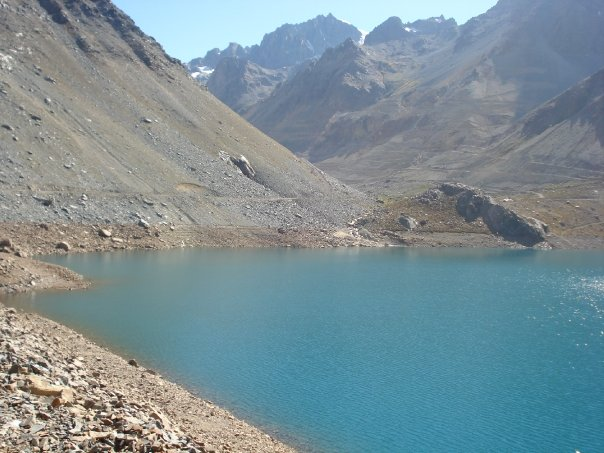
- View of the northwestern shore of the lake

- Location in Chile
- Location: Cachapoal Province, O'Higgins Region
- Coordinates: 34°34′4.31″S 70°30′49.03″W
- Type: Lake
- Basin countries: Chile
- Surface area: 0.486 km^{2} (0.188 sq mi) (2022)
- Surface elevation: 2,286 m (7,500 ft)

Laguna de los Cristales (lit. Lagoon of the Crystals) is a small lake located in the Andes of O'Higgins Region in Central Chile. The lake is natural in origin, but its water level was raised by a dam inaugurated in 1976 aimed to provide water for irrigation in Rengo. Local folklore tells of a treasure, an entierro, that is hidden in the bottom of the lake.
