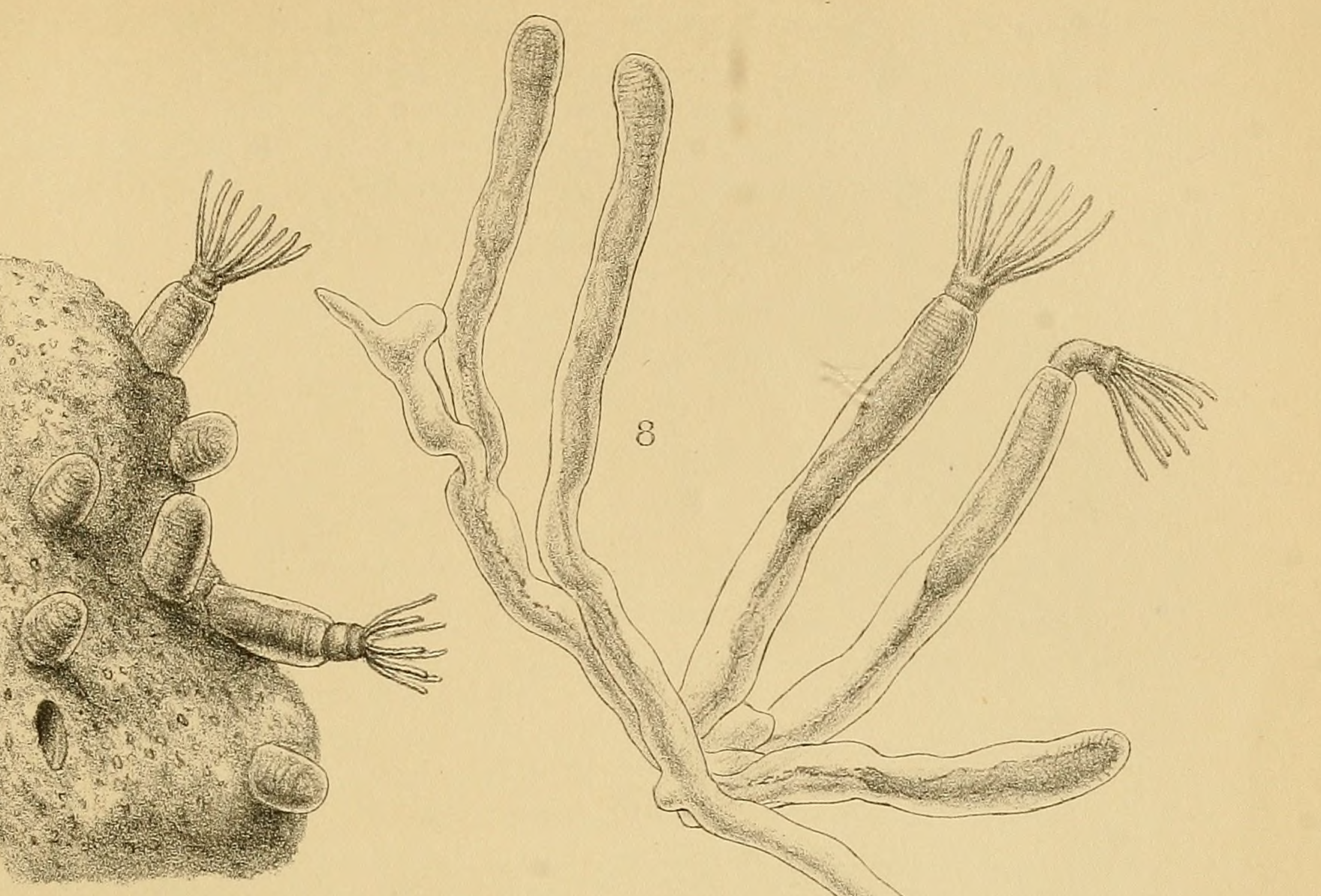
- Victorella symbiotica

Scientific classification
- Kingdom: Animalia
- Phylum: Bryozoa
- Class: Gymnolaemata
- Order: Ctenostomatida
- Family: Victorellidae
- Genus: Victorella; Saville Kent, 1870

Species
- See text.

= Victorella =

Genus of moss animals

Victorella is a genus of bryozoans in the family Victorellidae.

== Species ==
The following species are recognised:

- Victorella araceae Vieira, Migotto & Winston, 2014
- Victorella bengalensis Annandale, 1908
- Victorella bergi Abrikosov, 1959
- Victorella continentalis Braem, 1911
- Victorella muelleri (Kraepelin, 1887)
- Victorella pavida Saville Kent, 1870
- Victorella pseudoarachnidia Jebram & Everitt, 1982
- Victorella soulei d'Hondt, 1976
- Victorella symbiotica Rousselet, 1907
