= Ocoa, Chile =

Ocoa
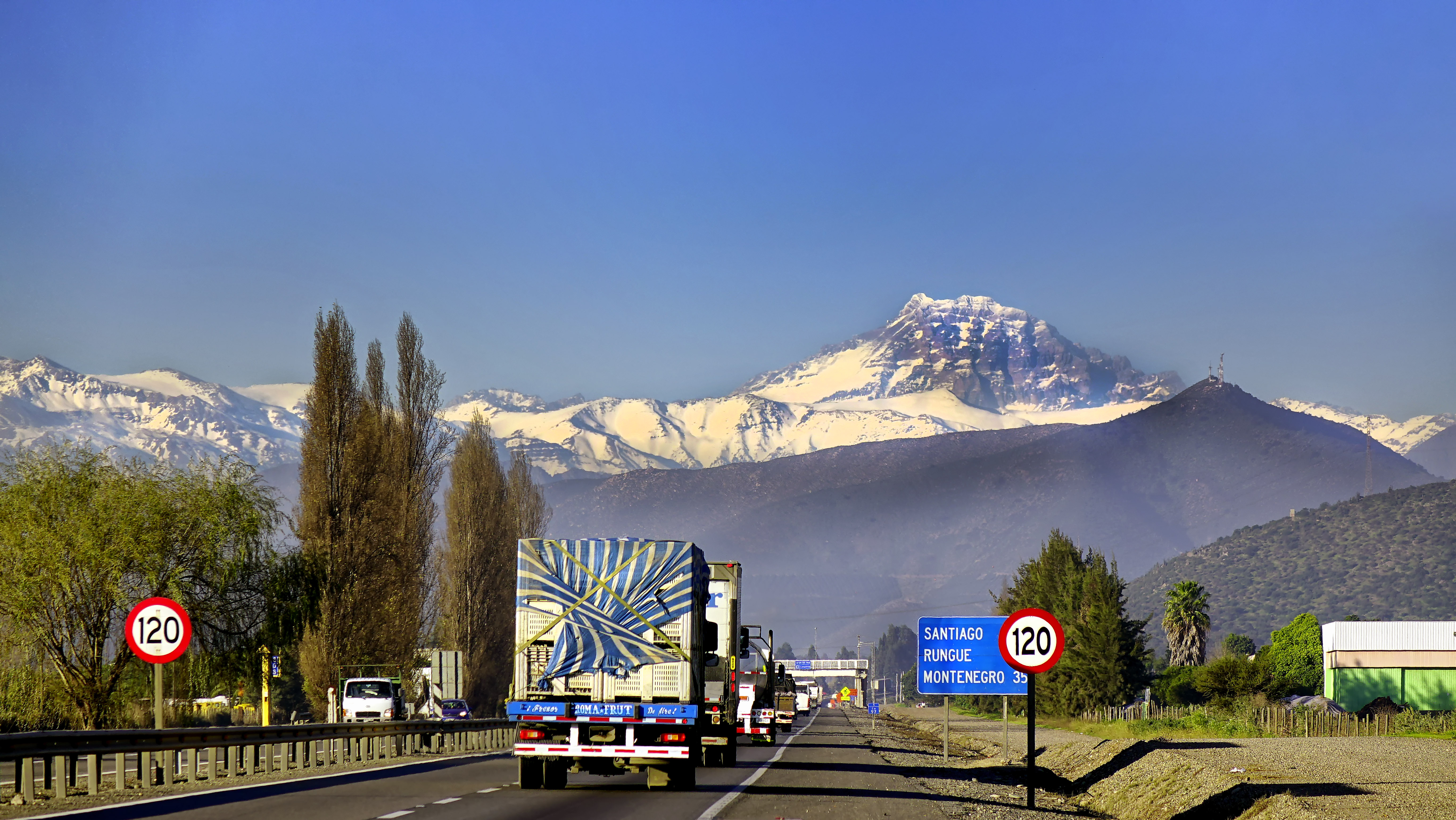
- Ocoa with Aconcagua in the background.
- Interactive map of Ocoa
- Coordinates: 32.92792°S 71.126°W
- Region: Valparaíso
- Province: Quillota
- Municipality: Hijuelas
- Commune: Hijuelas

Government
  - Type: Municipal
- Elevation: 322 m (1,056 ft)

Population (2017)
  - Total: 181
- Estación Ocoa
- Time zone: UTC−04:00 (Chilean Standard)
  - Summer (DST): UTC−03:00 (Chilean Daylight)
- Area code: Country + town = 56 + 64

Ocoa is a valley and locality located in commune of Hijuelas in the interior of Valparaíso Region, Chile. Historically Ocoa was the site of a large landholding owned by the Jesuits. There the Jesuits grep hemp. It was confiscated during the Suppression of the Society of Jesus in 1767. Folklore says Jesuits buried their valuables. By some accounts the buried treasure was once found but nothing was extracted since the vault proved resistant to dynamite. Another saying tells that those who seek to recover the treasure become cursed.
