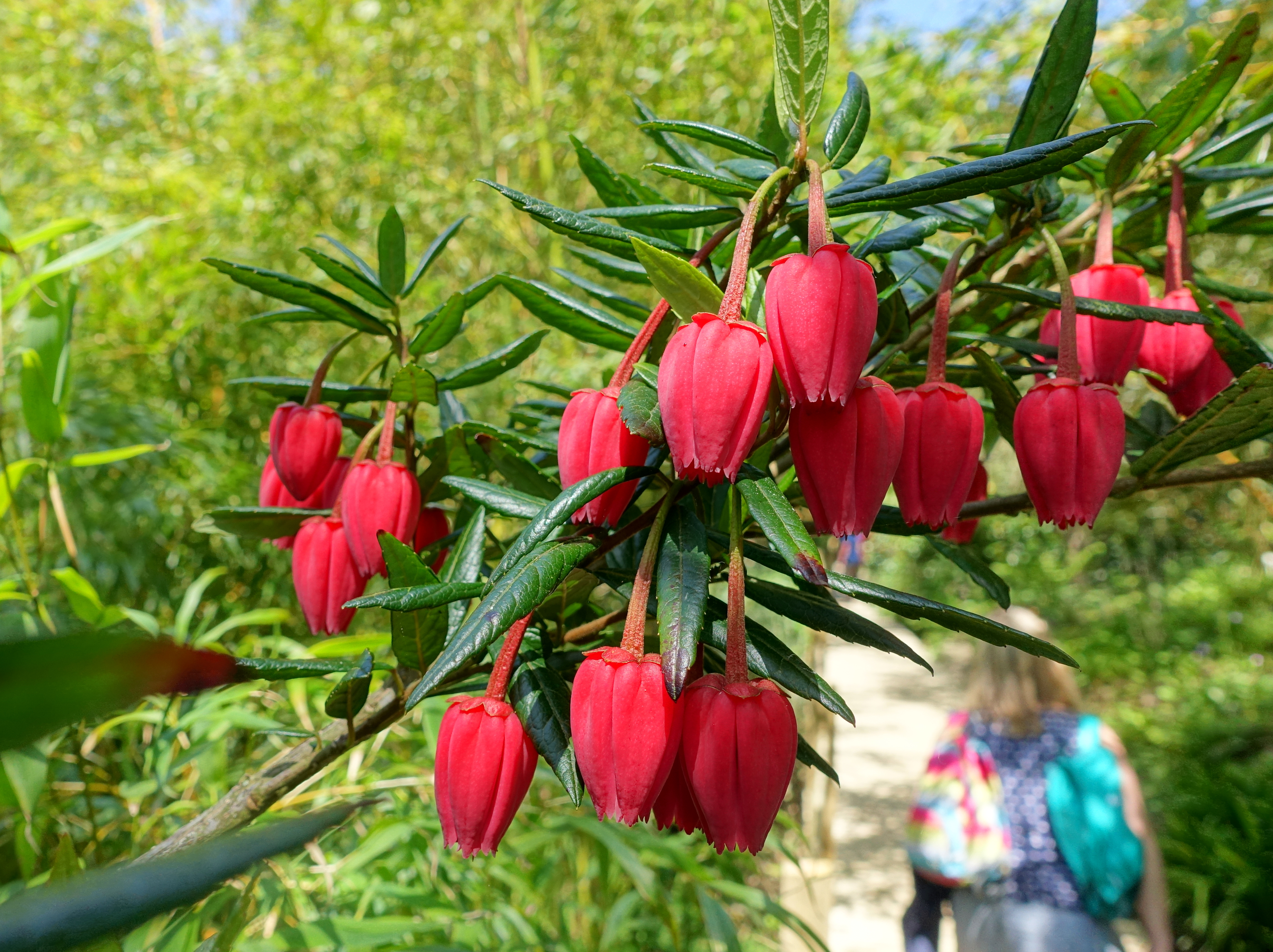

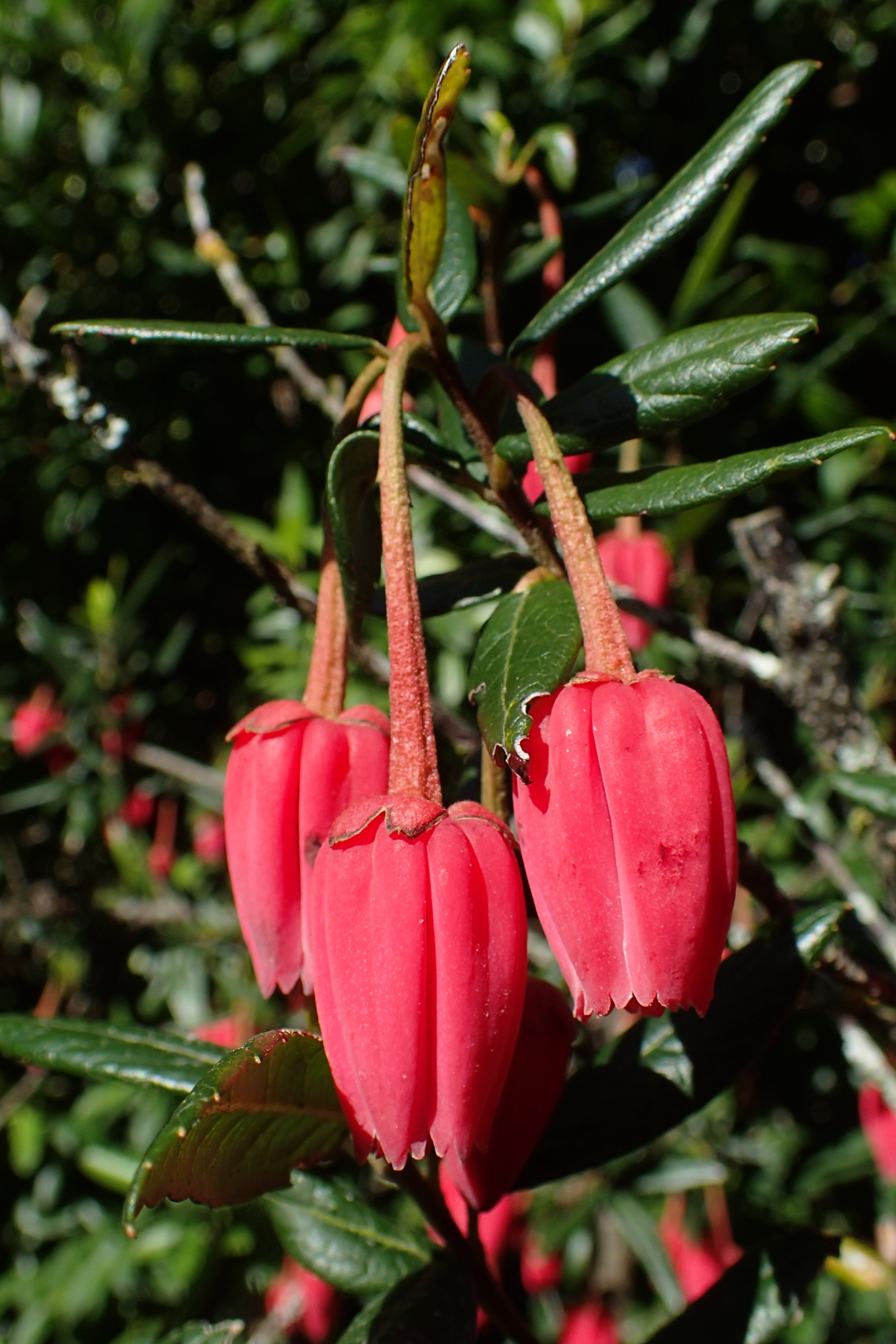

Scientific classification
- Kingdom: Plantae
- Clade: Tracheophytes
- Clade: Angiosperms
- Clade: Eudicots
- Clade: Rosids
- Order: Oxalidales
- Family: Elaeocarpaceae
- Genus: Crinodendron
- Species: C. hookerianum

Binomial name
- Crinodendron hookerianum Gay

- Distribution of Crinodendron hookerianum (South-Central Chile)

Synonyms
- Tricuspidaria hookeriana (Gay) R.O.Cunn.; Crinodendron eriocladum Gand.; Tricuspidaria lanceolata Miq.

= Crinodendron hookerianum =

Species of flowering plant endemic to Chile

Crinodendron hookerianum, known as the Chilean lantern tree, is an evergreen tree in the family Elaeocarpaceae. It is endemic to Chile, where it occurs from Cautin to Palena (38 to 43°S). It grows near streams and in very humid and shady places, and is often found in Valdivian temperate forests.

== Derivation of scientific name ==
The Latin generic name Crinodendron is a compound of the Ancient Greek words κρίνον (krínon) "lily" and δένδρον (dendrón) "tree", the "lily" element being inspired by the white-flowered C. patagua. The specific name hookerianum honours William Jackson Hooker, an English botanist who studied many Chilean plants. The genus Crinodendron is a small one, containing only four species, the other two (not generally cultivated in the United Kingdom) being C. tucumanum Lillo, a 25m tree native to Argentina, and the Brazilian C. brasiliense Reitz & L.B.sm.

== Common names in Chile ==
The plant has several names, derived from the native language of the Mapuche people and colonial Spanish, the most common of which is chaquihue (pronounced 'chaki-way'). Others include the variant forms chequehue and chaquehua, polizón (Spanish: 'vagrant', 'stowaway'), polisones, copío, coicopío and patagua roja (Spanish: "red patagua" – patagua being the vernacular name in Mapudungun for the white-flowered Crinodendron patagua – also endemic to Chile).

== Description ==
Crinodendron hookerianum is a shrub or small tree with ash-grey bark reaching up to 8 metres (26 ft) in height and having a trunk up to 30 centimetres (12 in) in diameter. Leaves alternate, lanceolate with toothed edges and acute apex, petiolate, 4–7 cm (1.6–2.8 in) long and 0.7–1.8 cm (0.28–0.71 in) wide, dark green above and hairy whitish green below. Flowers hermaphrodite, solitary and axillary, pinkish to red. The pedicels circa 3–6 cm (1.2–2.4 in) long, the calyx formed of 5 fused, green sepals, corolla campanulate, composed of 5 free petals terminating in 3 teeth, stamens 15–18, the style longer than the stamen. Fruit a white, pubescent, leathery capsule with 3 to 5 valves. Seeds ovoid, glossy.

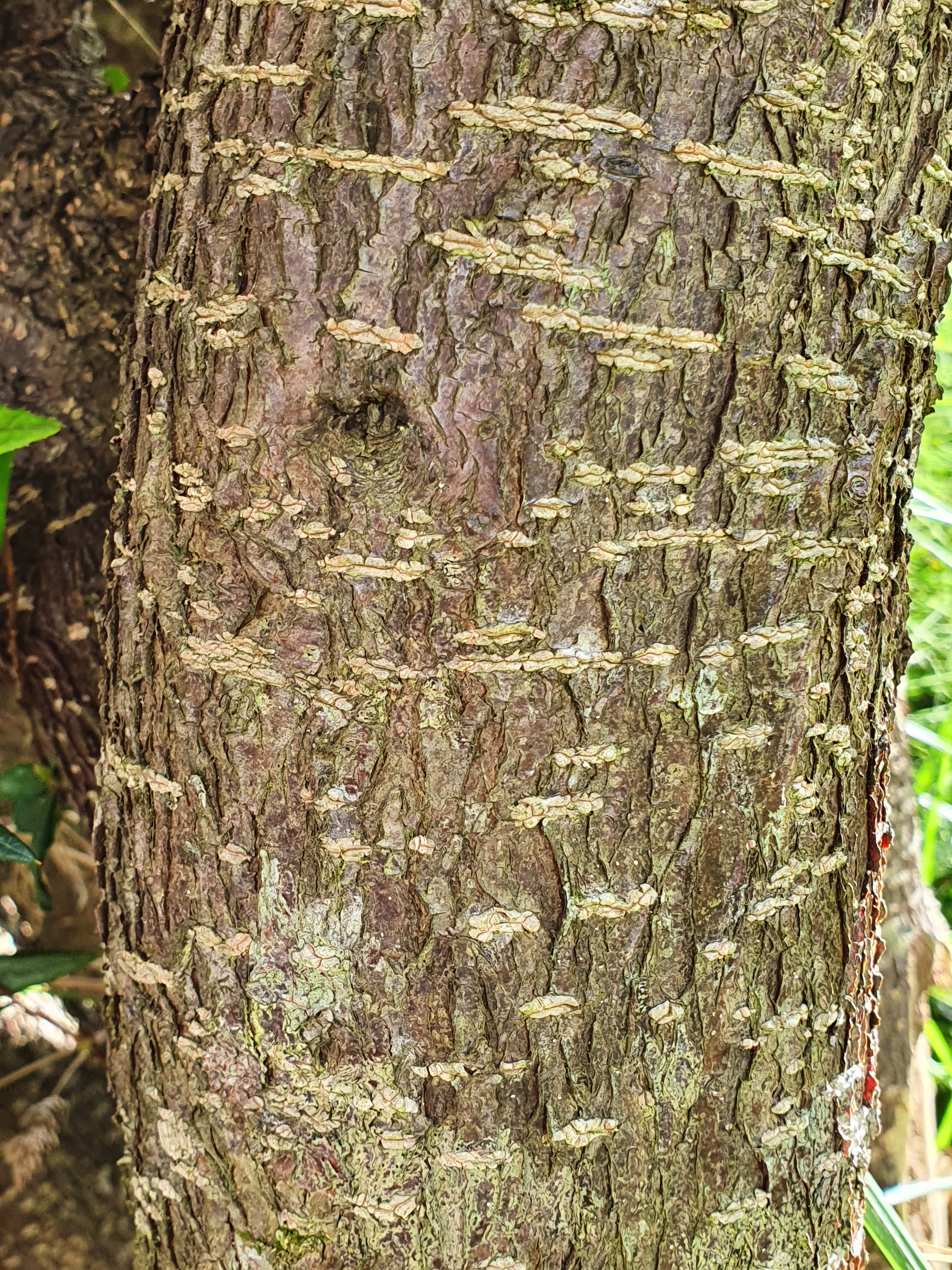
Bark of Crinodendron hookerianum

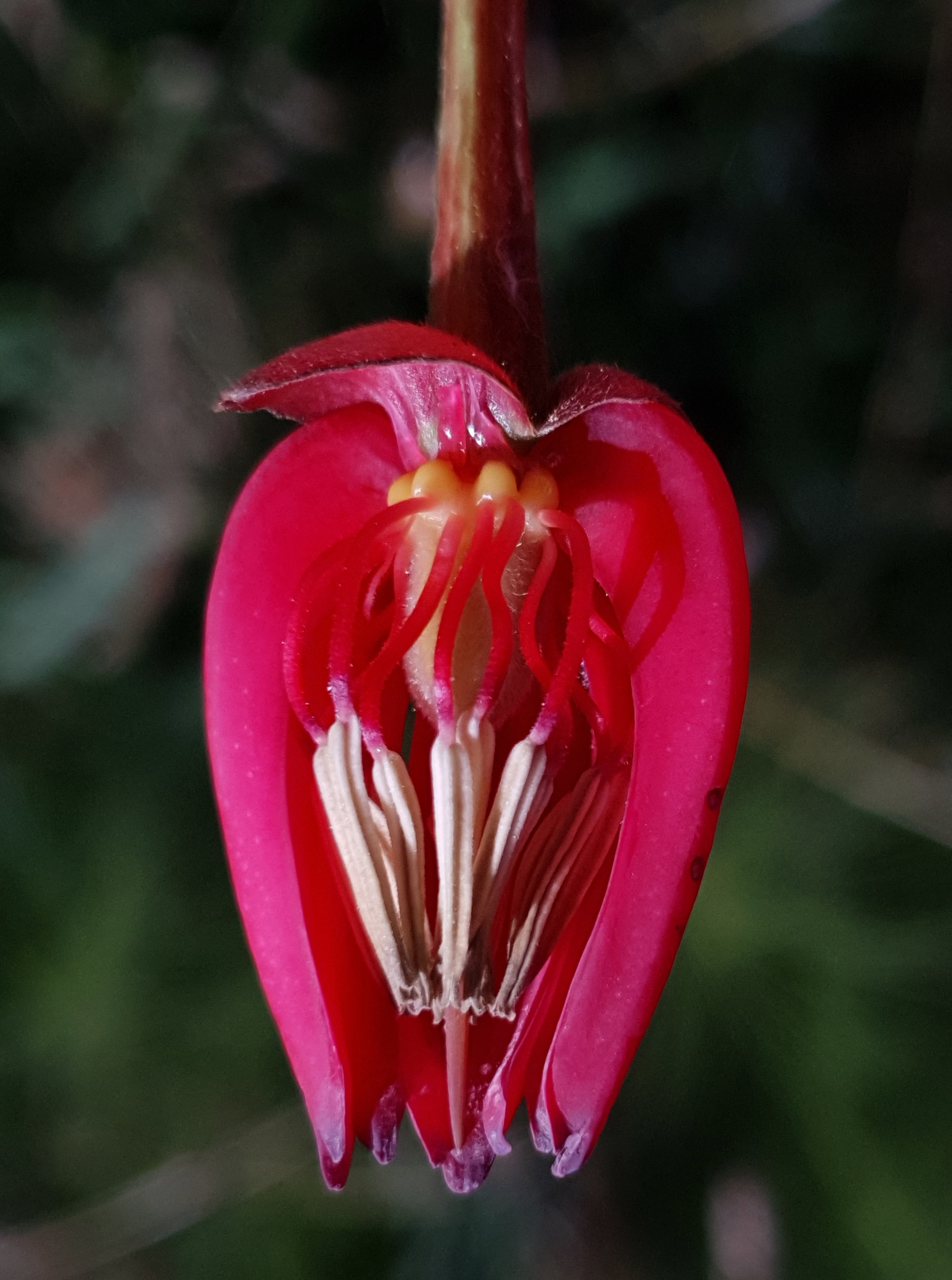
Internal details of Crinodendron hookerianum flower

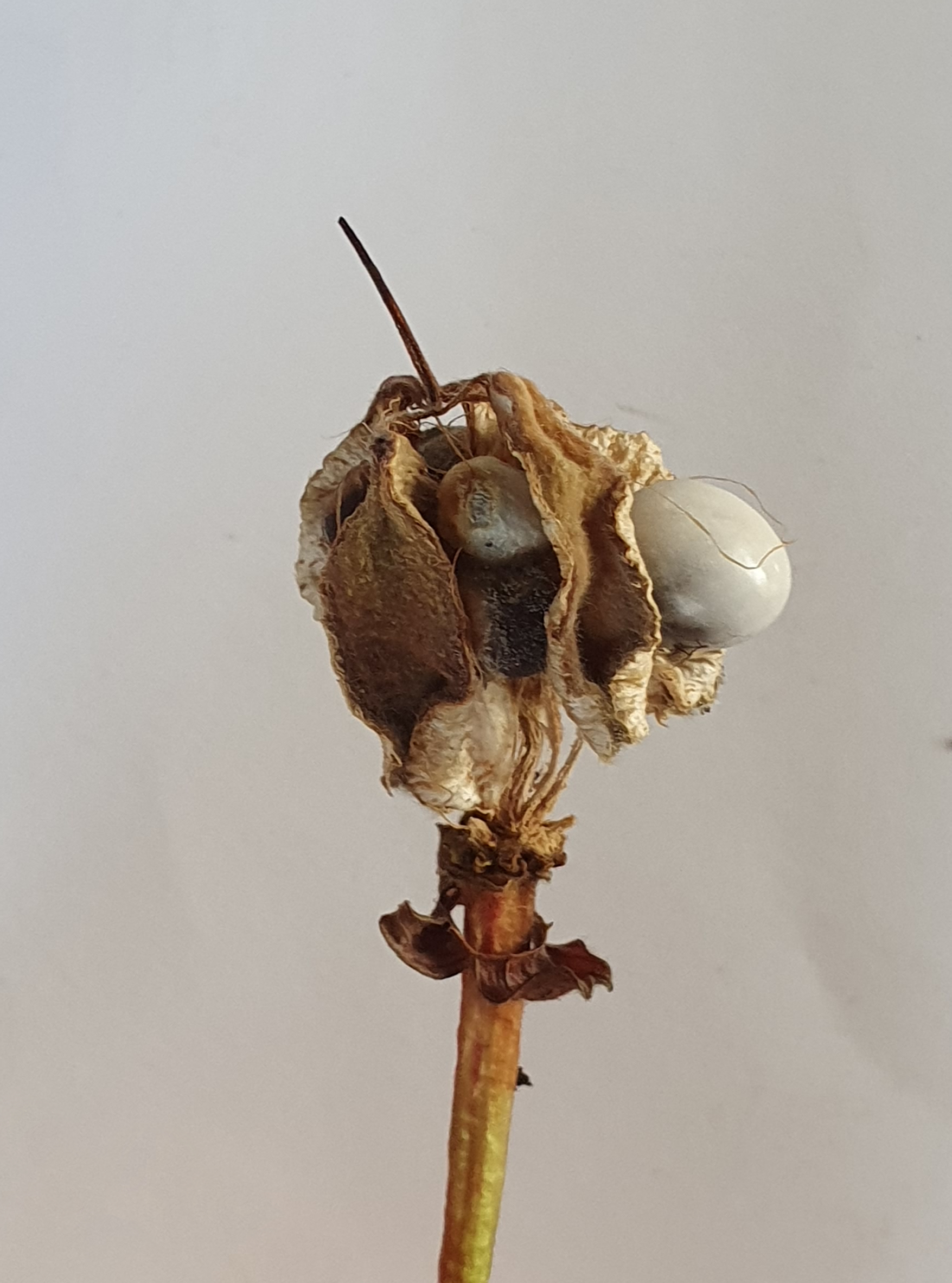
Capsule fruit of Crinodendron hookerianum

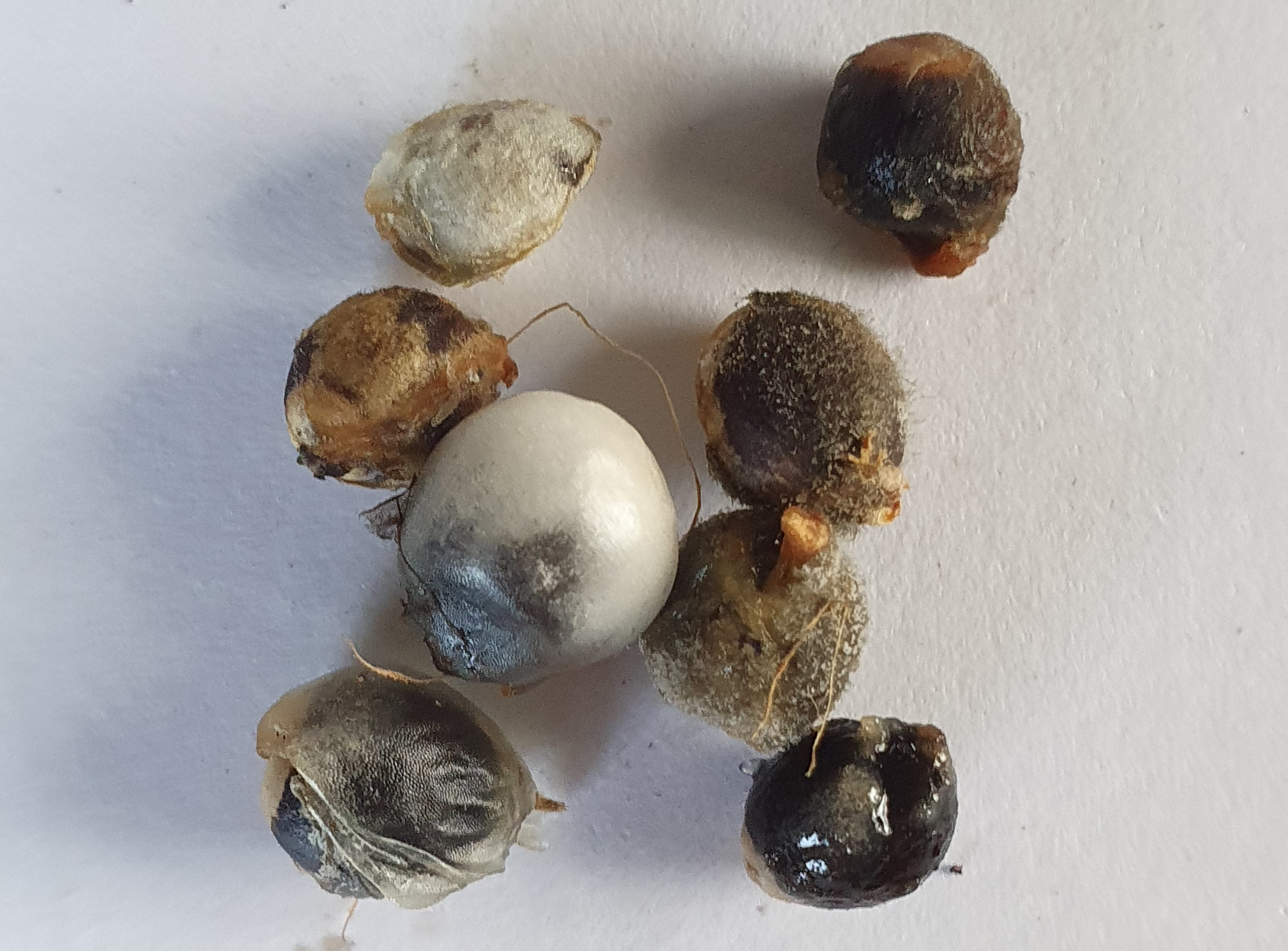
Crinodendron hookerianum seeds

== Toxicity and medicinal uses ==
The plant is somewhat poisonous, its toxicity referable to its containing cucurbitacins, a class of cytotoxic triterpenoids named for their frequent occurrence in genera of the cucumber and gourd family Cucurbitaceae, such as Bryonia. Contact with the sap of plants containing high levels of cucurbitacins can lead to skin inflammation and blistering, while consumption of plant material containing such compounds can lead to gastrointestinal irritation with vomiting and bloody diarrhoea, tachycardia and damage to the liver (hepatotoxicity) and kidneys (among other symptoms), the poisoning sometimes proving fatal. C. hookerianum is used in the folk medicine of Chile as an emmenagogue and abortifacient and the leaves and bark are considered to have emetic properties. Although toxic, the shrub is also regarded as "balsamic" a rather vague designation referable to its medicinal value and aromatic constituents (although see also balsam).

== Cultivation ==
Crinodendron hookerianum was introduced into cultivation in the U.K. by Cornish plant collector William Lobb for Veitch Nurseries of Exeter in 1848. Its flowers make it a highly valued ornamental shrub or small tree, and it has gained the Royal Horticultural Society's Award of Garden Merit. It attains maximum dimensions in cultivation approximately 8m in height by 5m in spread.

Crinodendron hookerianum is best grown in fertile, moist but well-drained, humus-rich, acid soil in partial shade (in full sun only if the roots can be kept cool and shaded) in a sheltered woodland garden or against a south- or west-facing wall where it is sheltered from cold, drying winds. It is hardy to −7 °C (19 °F), but young growth and flower buds are susceptible to damage by hard frosts – the latter because the small flower buds are formed in autumn, ripening during winter and spring to flower in the following summer.

It has been planted as far north as Scotland – and thrives in those areas of the western Scotland that are warmed by the Gulf Stream – as at the Benmore Botanic Garden. In the United Kingdom, it thrives best in the generally mild climates of Cornwall, and Devon, and in Ireland in the similarly mild climate of counties Cork and Kerry, as at the garden on Garnish Island. It can also be grown in a cool greenhouse or conservatory, under which conditions it will flower earlier.

Although the only pruning generally required in colder areas is the removal of dead wood in late spring, in milder areas in a light woodland environment it can even be clipped to make a wind-break. Vegetative propagation is by greenwood cuttings in early summer or semi-ripe-wood cuttings in late summer. With regard to pests and diseases the plant is generally trouble-free.
