= Dufflin (apple) =

Variety of cider apple

'Dufflin'
- Species: Malus domestica
- Origin: Cornwall, late 1800s.

Dufflin is an old variety of cider apple from the County of Cornwall, England. It was included in orchard trials by Long Ashton Research Station in 1957.

== Origins ==
In the 19th century, they were known to be growing in the area around Kea near Truro.

== Characteristics ==
This variety has a high sugar content, adding sweetness to the bittersharp flavour. Due to these equalities, it has been prized for making and blending cider. The trees are vigorous croppers and is also resistant to apple scab. It has a heavy, russeted skin and soft flesh.

== In literature ==
Dufflin cider mentioned in a story by the Cornish writer, Sir Arthur Thomas Quiller-Couch, in his book, "Ia, and other tales" , which was published by Bernhard Tauchnitz, Leipzig in 1896. In the story the main character: Ia Rosemundy, spills Dufflin cider on Rev Paul Heathcote, a visiting preacher.
