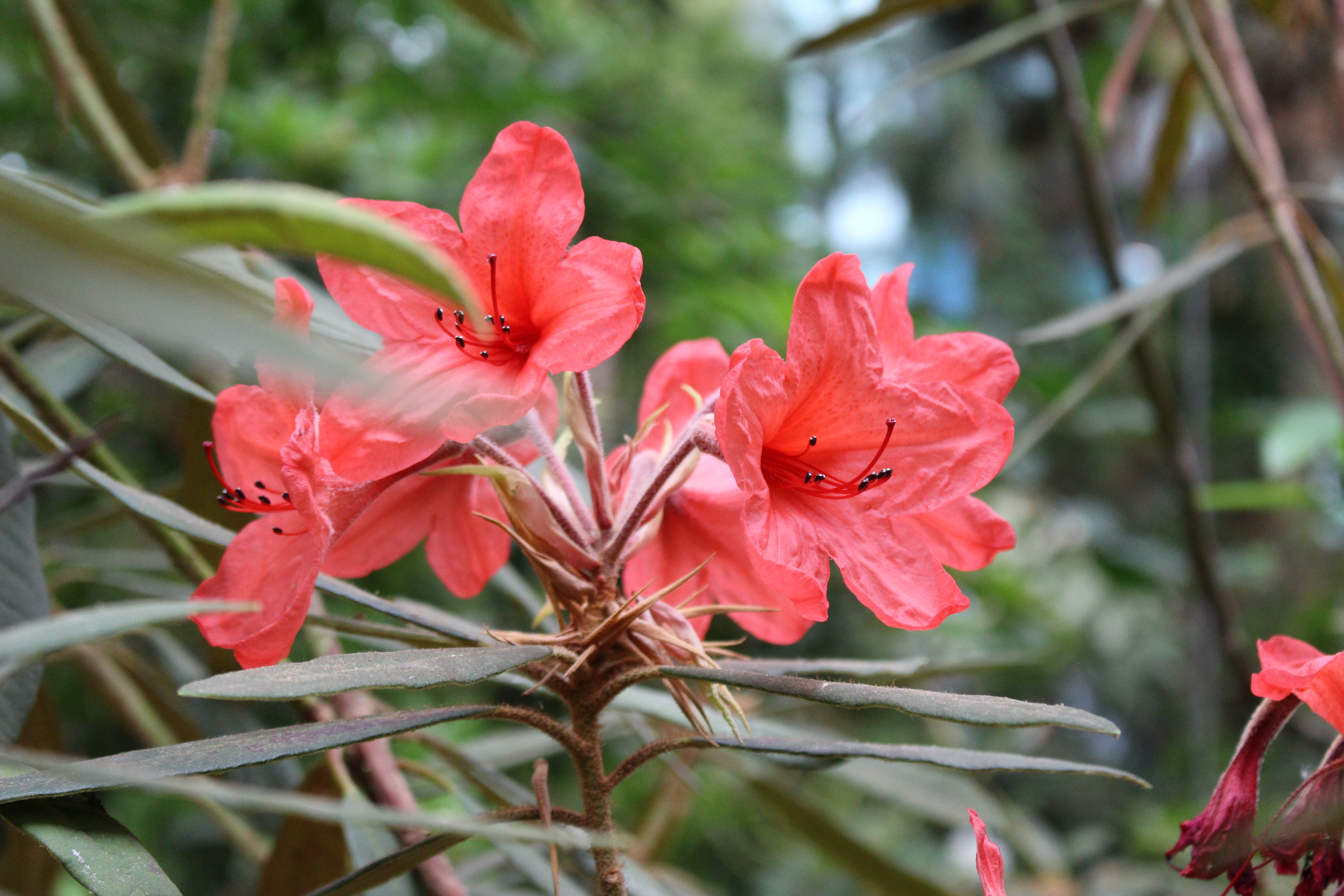

Scientific classification
- Kingdom: Plantae
- Clade: Tracheophytes
- Clade: Angiosperms
- Clade: Eudicots
- Clade: Asterids
- Order: Ericales
- Family: Ericaceae
- Genus: Rhododendron
- Species: R. griersonianum

Binomial name
- Rhododendron griersonianum Balf.f. & Forrest

Synonyms
- Hymenanthes griersoniana (Balf.f. & Forrest) H.F.Copel.

= Rhododendron griersonianum =

Species of plant

Rhododendron griersonianum is a species of flowering plant in the family Ericaceae. It is native to western Yunnan (China) and Myanmar, where it grows in mixed forests and thickets at altitudes of 1,600–2,700 m (5,200–8,900 ft). This evergreen shrub reaches an average height of 1.3 m (4.3 ft). The 5–12-flowered inflorescences appear from May to June, with the seeds ripening in March of the following year.

It is fairly hardy, but prefers a sunny position. This highly distinctive species was introduced to western horticulture in 1917 by the Scottish planthunter George Forrest, who later commented:

"Extremely local; essentially a plant of the open, seldom, if ever, seen in the shade, though the glades where it is seen at its best are always more or less sheltered. In addition to the striking beauty of the flowers it is a most shapely shrub."

It is the parent of many hybrids.
