= Victorellidae =

Scientific classification
- Kingdom: Animalia
- Phylum: Bryozoa
- Class: Gymnolaemata
- Order: Ctenostomatida
- Superfamily: Victorelloidea
- Family: Victorellidae; Hincks, 1880

Family of bryozoans

Victorellidae is a family of bryozoans belonging to the order Ctenostomatida.

Genera:

- Bulbella Braem, 1951
- Sineportella Wood & Marsh, 1996
- Tanganella Braem, 1951
- Victorella Saville-Kent, 1870
