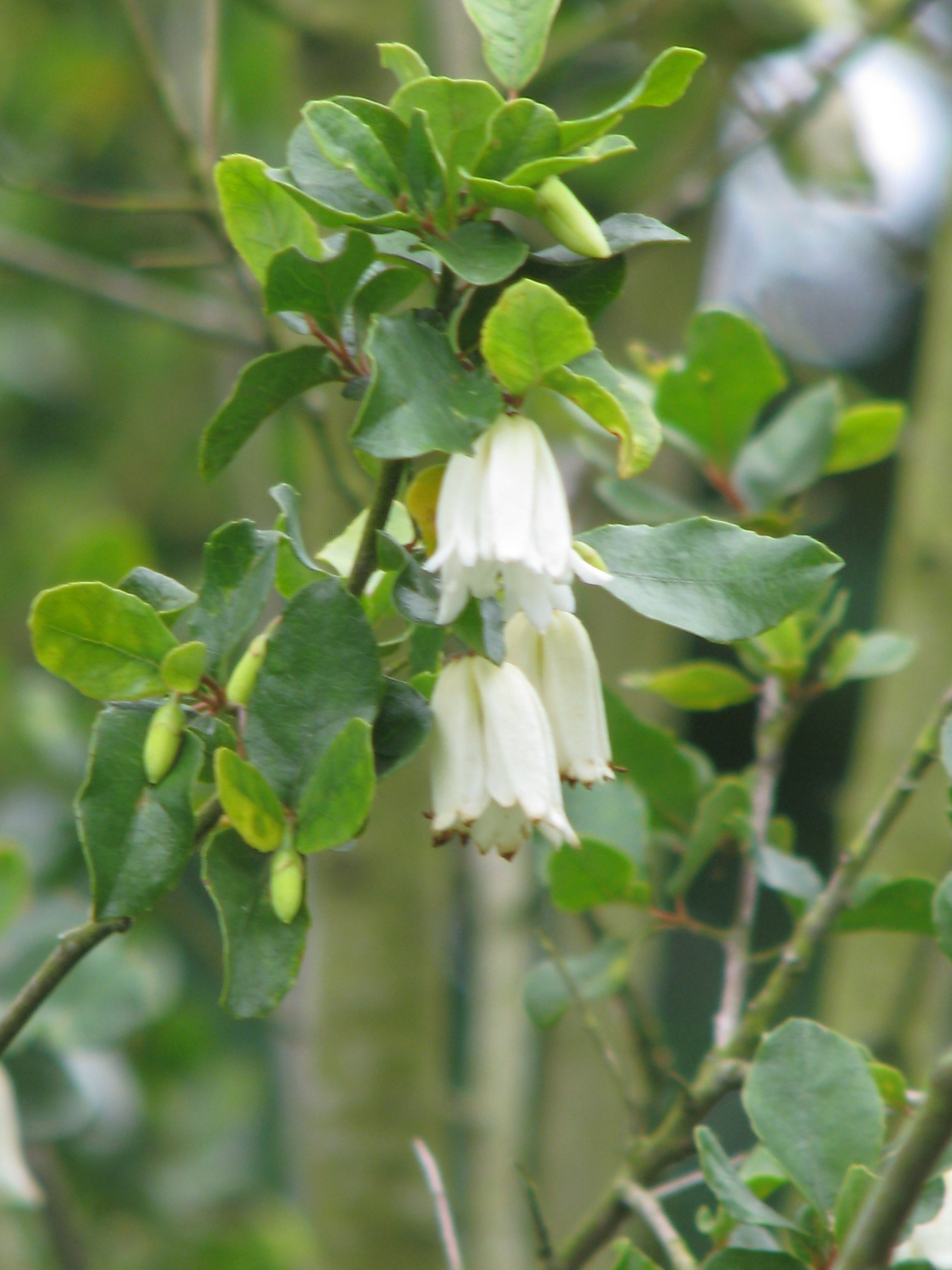

Scientific classification
- Kingdom: Plantae
- Clade: Tracheophytes
- Clade: Angiosperms
- Clade: Eudicots
- Clade: Rosids
- Order: Oxalidales
- Family: Elaeocarpaceae
- Genus: Crinodendron
- Species: C. patagua

Binomial name
- Crinodendron patagua Mol.

Synonyms
- Tricuspidaria patagua (Molina) Miers; Crinodendron dependens (Ruiz & Pav.) Kuntze; Tricuspidaria dependens Ruiz & Pav.; Tricuspidaria hexapetala Turcz.; Tricuspis dependens (Ruiz & Pav.) Pers.

= Crinodendron patagua =

Species of flowering plant endemic to Chile

Crinodendron patagua, the patagua or lily of the valley tree (also a name for Clethra arborea), is a species of evergreen tree. It is endemic to Chile, where it grows from 33° to 36° South latitude, up to 1200 m (4000 ft) above sea level in elevation. It is found in wet habitats and prefers ravines.

== Description ==
This tree reaches a height up to 10 m (33 ft). Leaves are simple, oblong with serrate margins. It produces white flowers with bell-shaped corolla of five petals. The fruit is a capsule which is orange-colored when mature.

According to Chilean folklore, the patagua originates from women who cried before God in repentance of their sins. Because of this, they were saved from obliteration but suffered, in contrast to "just" people, transformation into trees. This would explain the pataguas common resemblance to human figures and why some Indigenous people would fall in love with some pataguas. Folklore also says pataguas may signal the presence of an entierro.

== Cultivation and uses ==
It is used for honey production. The tannin contained in bark is used for tanning leather. The wood is used in furniture. It is easy to cultivate and therefore it is used for reforestation as it can be planted by seeds, is very fast-growing, and tolerates frosts. It has been introduced successfully as ornamental in New Zealand, California, Ireland, Scotland, Wales and some parts of England, although it does not flower as freely in the United Kingdom as the equally ornamental and more widely cultivated Crinodendron hookerianum, which is red or pink-flowered.

Etymology: Crinodendron (Greek: "lily tree") and patagua (mapuche name of the tree). Formerly named Tricuspidaria dependens Ruiz et Pav.
