= Victorella pavida =

Scientific classification
- Kingdom: Animalia
- Phylum: Bryozoa
- Class: Gymnolaemata
- Order: Ctenostomatida
- Family: Victorellidae
- Genus: Victorella
- Species: V. pavida

Binomial name
- Victorella pavida Saville Kent, 1870

Species of moss animal

Victorella pavida or trembling sea mat is a species of bryozoan found in shallow waters of low or fluctuating salinity, such as lagoons and estuaries. In summer (the growing season) it can have the appearance of velvet. The zooids may be from 0.3 mm to 1 mm in length. They live in colonies underwater attaching to stones. They feed using tiny hairs attached to their crown of tentacles to catch tiny particles flowing through the water, also known as "filter feeding".

== Distribution ==
It is common in the Mediterranean Sea, and has also been reported in the North Sea (on the European Mainland), the Baltic, the Black Sea, India, Japan, Brazil, and the eastern United States. Swanpool, a coastal saline lagoon (brackish lake), in Falmouth, has been recorded to have significant populations of Victorella pavida. Data from 2012, recorded by the Environment Agency, suggests that this species is also present within the River Thames Estuary; albeit in low numbers.

Within England, V. pavida is listed as a Natural Environment Research Council species of 'Principal Importance' (Section 41) and is protected under Schedule 5 of the Wildlife and Countryside Act 1981 (as amended).
