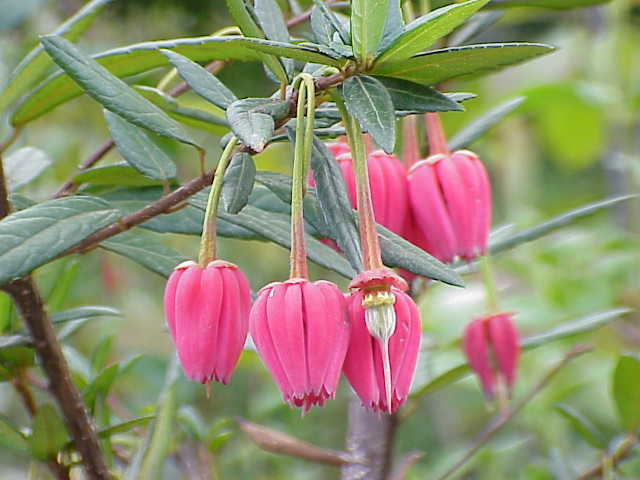
- C. hookerianum

Scientific classification
- Kingdom: Plantae
- Clade: Tracheophytes
- Clade: Angiosperms
- Clade: Eudicots
- Clade: Rosids
- Order: Oxalidales
- Family: Elaeocarpaceae
- Genus: Crinodendron; Molina

Type species
- Crinodendron patagua Molina

Synonyms
- Tricuspidaria Ruiz & Pav.; Tricuspis Pers.

= Crinodendron =

Genus of flowering plants native to South America

Crinodendron is a genus of evergreen shrubs or trees belonging to the family Elaeocarpaceae native to South America. Some are cultivated as ornamentals in Europe and elsewhere. They have narrow, leathery evergreen leaves and pendent bell-shaped flowers in red, pink or white.

== Description ==
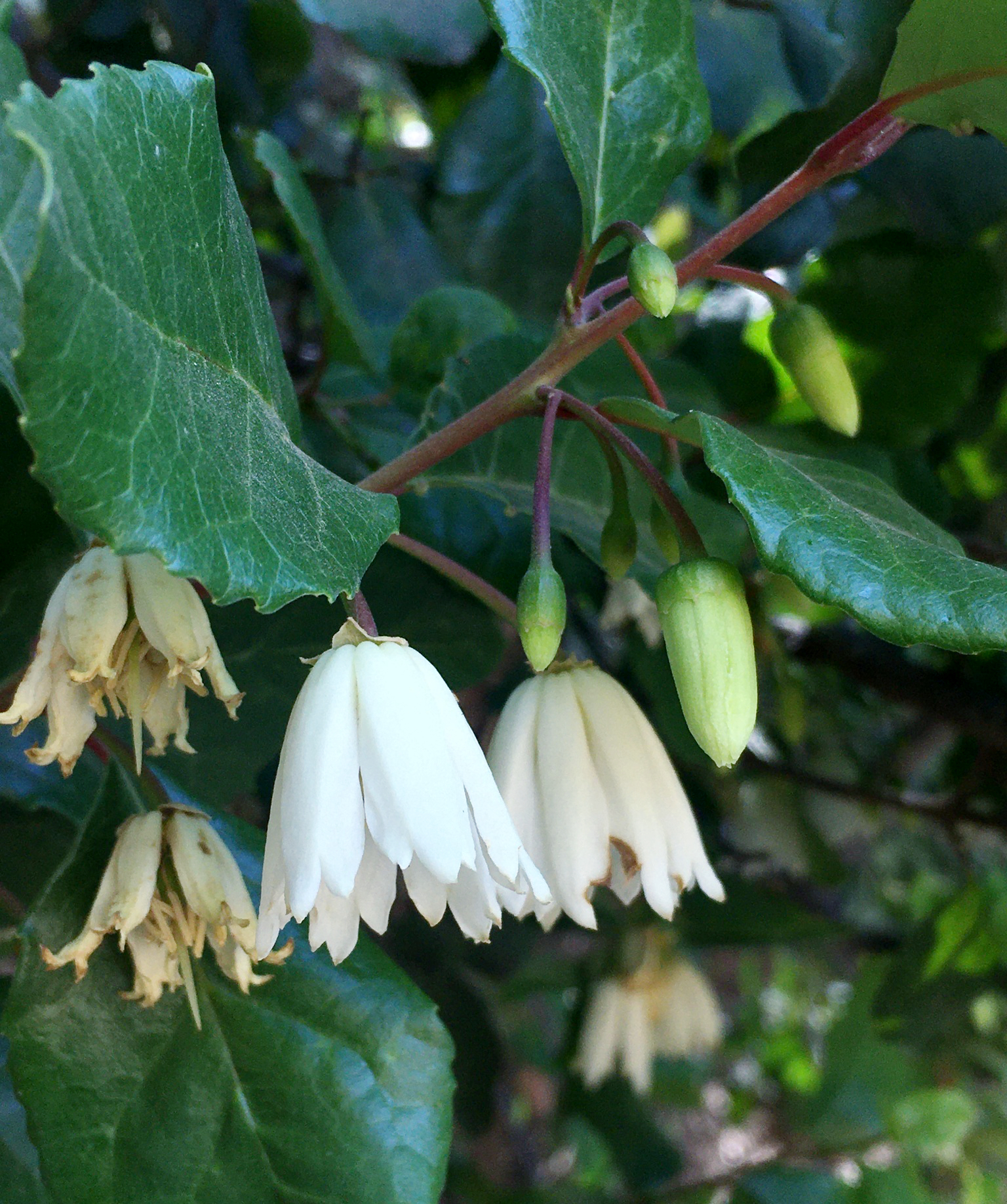
Crinodendron patagua flowering

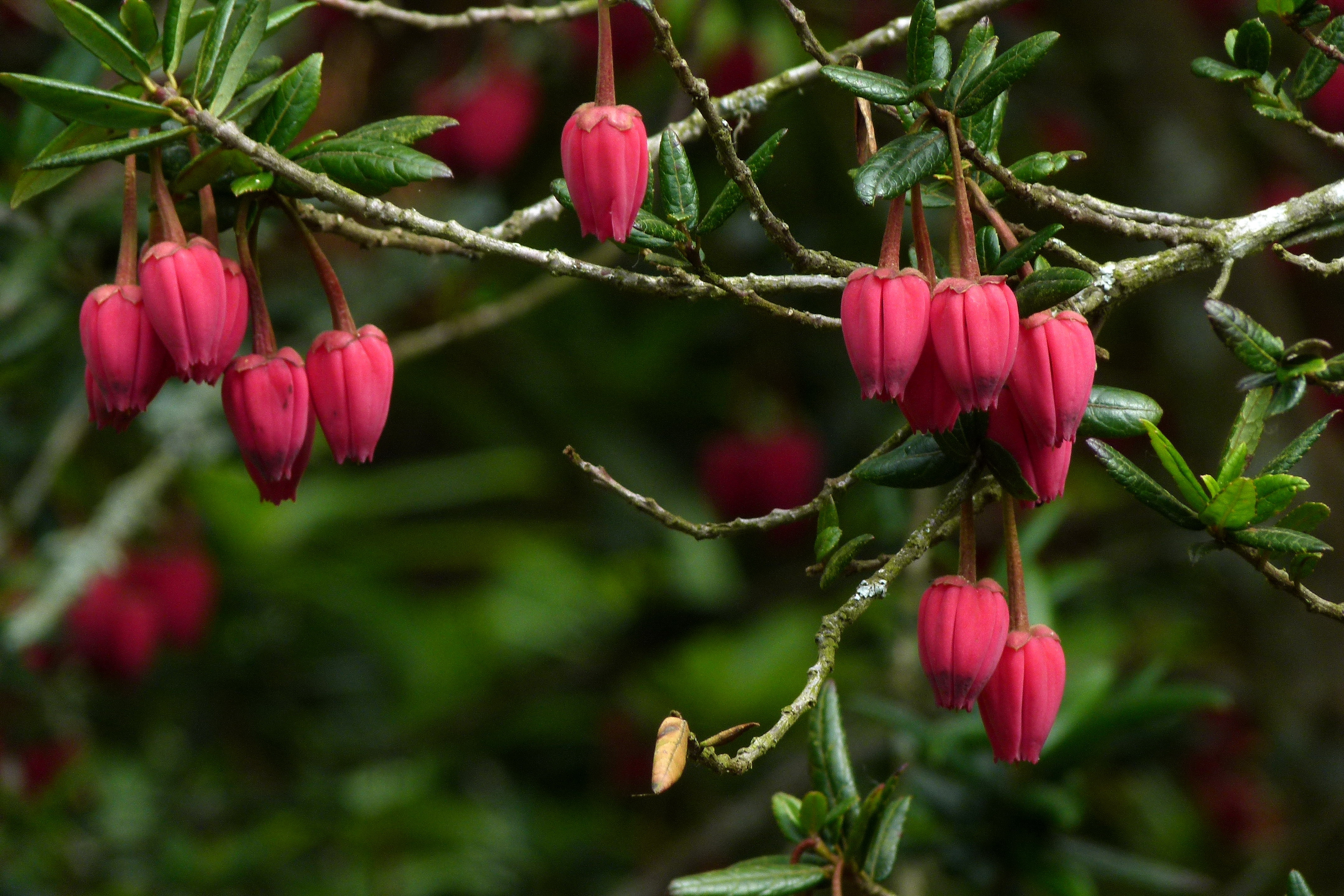
Crinodendron hookerianum flowering

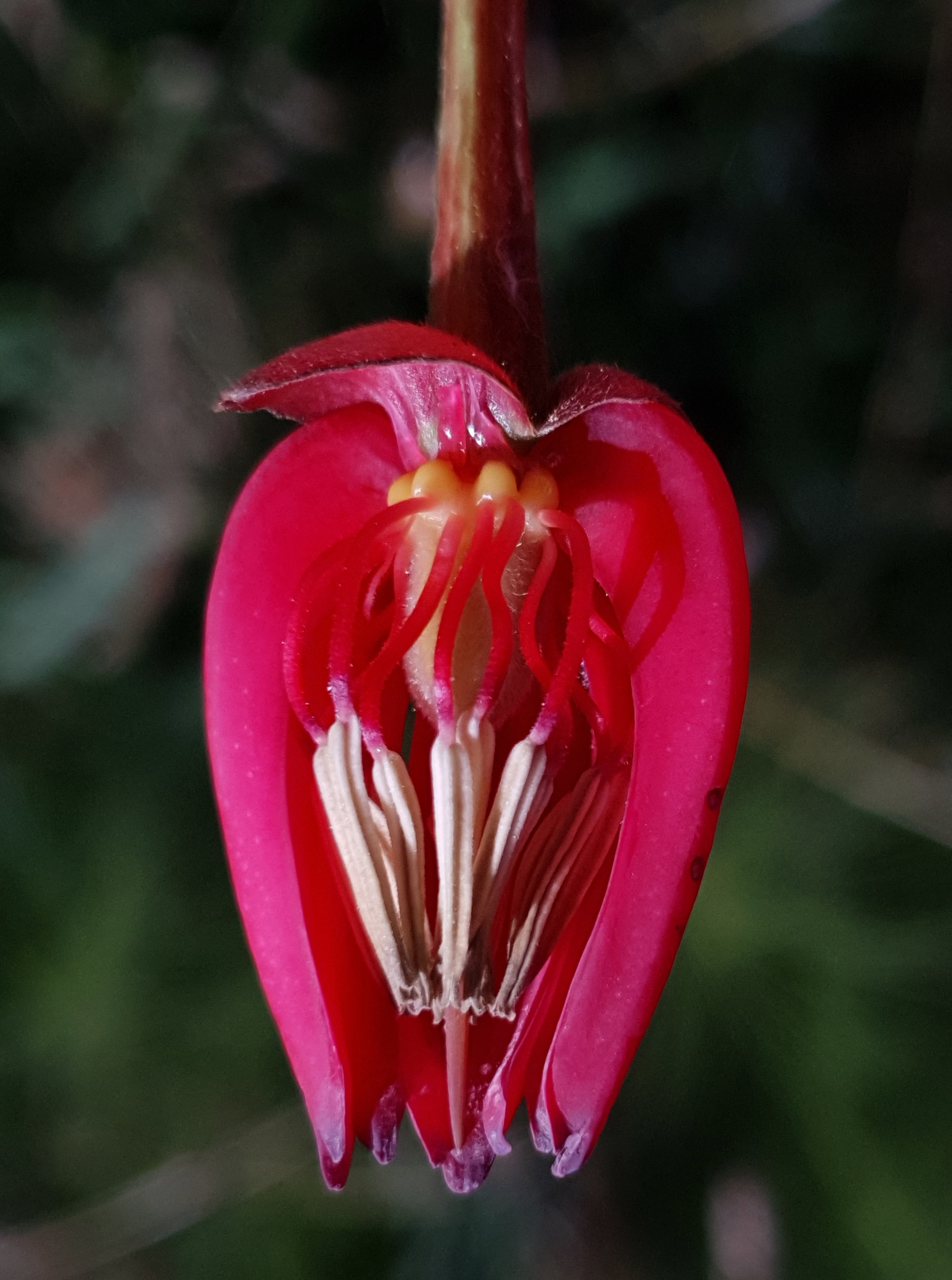
Crinodendron hookerianum flower detail

Crinodendron are 2–7 m (6.6–23 ft) tall, evergreen trees or shrubs.

== Taxonomy ==
It was published by Giovanni Ignazio Molina in 1782 with Crinodendron patagua Molina as the type species.

=== Species ===
It has four species:

1. Crinodendron brasiliense Reitz & L.B.Sm.
2. Crinodendron hookerianum Gay
3. Crinodendron patagua Molina
4. Crinodendron tucumanum Lillo

=== Etymology ===
The generic name Crinodendron is composed of two Greek words: krinon, meaning lily, in reference to the fragrant, white, lily-like flowers of Crinodendron patagua, and dendron, meaning tree.

=== Evolution ===
This genus is most closely related to the Australian Peripentadenia. They appear to descend from a common ancestor that dispersed across the Antarctic land bridge during the Late Cretaceous.

== Distribution ==
It is native to Argentina, Bolivia, Brazil, Chile, and has been introduced to the Juan Fernández Islands.

== Ecology ==
=== Pollination ===
Crinodendron patagua is insect pollinated, Crinodendron hookerianum is hummingbird pollinated, and Crinodendron tucumanum is insect pollinated.

== Horticulture ==
In cultivation in temperate areas they require a sheltered location.
