= Swanpool, Cornwall =

Small coastal saline lagoon on the south coast of Cornwall, England

Coordinates: 50.14°N 5.07°W

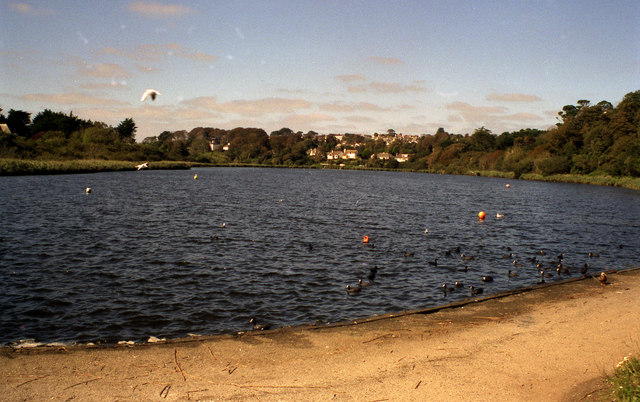
Swanpool

Swanpool (Cornish: Lynnyeyn Pryskelow, meaning 'cold pool of the elm thicket') is a small coastal saline lagoon with a shingle bar, separating it from the beach of the same name. The South West Coast Path crosses the bar. The pool is near the town of Falmouth, on the south coast of Cornwall, England, UK, between Maenporth and Gyllyngvase. A notable building in the area is Swanpool House, a 19th-century building which was occupied by American forces during the Second World War but is now in use as holiday apartments. There was formerly a mine extending beneath the lagoon.

== Natural history ==
Coastal saline lagoons are water bodies that are fed by saline water, in this case from the adjacent sea of Falmouth Bay, either by percolation through the bar, or, by restricted inlets such as a sluice. Swanpool also receives freshwater from a small stream and from rainfall. The water of Swanpool has permanent vertical stratification with variation in the salinity with depth.

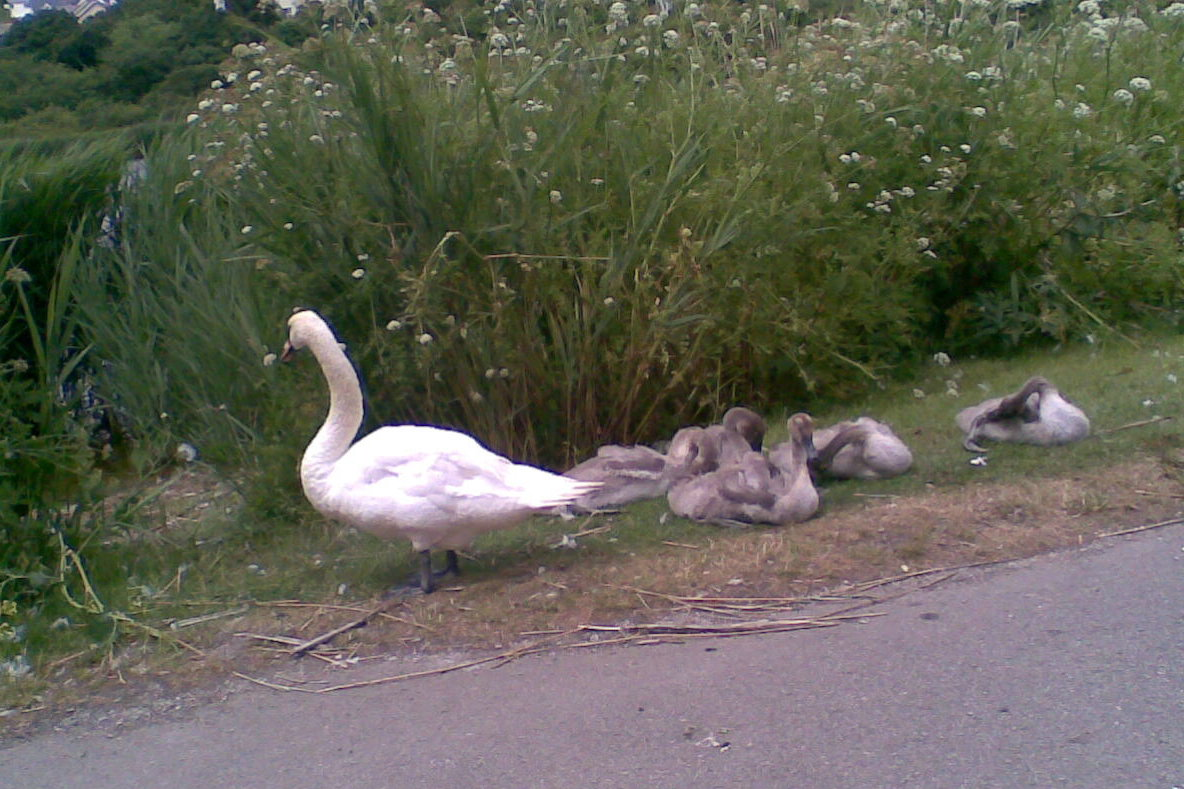
Swan family at Swanpool, July 2008

The pool is a Local Nature Reserve, and a Site of Special Scientific Interest. It is of scientific importance as it is one of the few locations that has the perfect salinity for the growth of the trembling sea mat (Victorella pavida), a bryozoan. Some other species of fauna and flora at Swanpool are: mallard, moorhen, mute swan, coot, water rail, kingfisher, little grebe, siskin, tufted duck, cuckoo flower and yellow flag iris.

=== Swanvale nature reserve ===
There is also a small Cornwall Wildlife Trust nature reserve called Swanvale which runs from the northern end of Swanpool towards the town. It comprises mostly willow carr, which provides shelter for many small birds and mammals.

== Swanpool mine ==
Swanpool mine is 80 fathoms (480 ft; 150 m) deep and produced £60,000 worth of silver-lead ore. It started in the early 18th century, closing in 1865 and recommenced on 22 November 1880, financed by Sir Julius Vogel and his friends. It closed shortly after 1885.

== Art ==
There is a painting by Wallace Martin, Falmouth Grammar School Swimming Sports at Sunny Cove, near Swanpool, Falmouth, dated to 1951.

== Visitor facilities ==
Swanpool Beach is a training ground for kayaking, paddleboarding and coasteering, with a beach café, a beach restaurant, beach huts for rent in the Summer, Hooked (formerly the Three Mackerels Restaurant), car-parking (charge in summer), a public lavatory and crazy golf. Dogs are not allowed on the beach between Easter Sunday and 1 October.
