= List of gardens in Cornwall =

This list is for notable gardens in Cornwall. It includes Botanical gardens and gardens which are on the: Register of Historic Parks and Gardens of special historic interest in England.

== Botanical gardens ==
Botanical gardens and arboreta in Cornwall.

- Lost Gardens of Heligan
- Eden Project
- Trebah
- Tresco Abbey Gardens

== Listed gardens ==
- Antony
- Caerhays
- Heligan
- Lanhydrock
- Mount Edgcumbe Country Park
- St Michael's Mount
- Trebah
- Tregrehan
- Trelissick
- Tresco Abbey (grade I)

== Other notable gardens ==
- Bonython
- Bosvigo House, Highertown, Truro
- Caerhays
- Carclew
- Chyvarno (at Lamorna)
- Chyverton
- County Demonstration Garden
- Duchy of Cornwall Nursery, Lostwithiel
- Glendurgan
- Headland, Polruan
- Ince
- Lanellen
- Pencarrow
- Penjerrick
- Scorrier House
- Tremeer
- Trengwainton
- Trerice
- Tresillian, Newlyn East
- Trevarno
- Trewidden
- Trewithen

Gardens in Cornwall which are open for charity at appointed times include Boconnoc, Bonython, Bosvigo, Cotehele, Eden Project, Glendurgan, Godolphin, Heligan, Headland at Polruan, Ince Castle, Lanhydrock, Pencarrow, St Michael's Mount, Scorrier, Trebah, Trebartha, Trelissick, Trematon Castle, Trengwainton and Trewan Hall.

== See also ==
- Category:Listed parks and gardens in Cornwall

== Footnotes ==
- Taylor, Patrick (1999) Patrick Taylor's Guide to Gardens of Britain & Ireland; 8th ed. London: Dorling Kindersley; The Sunday Telegraph ISBN 0-7513-0655-X
