= Cueva del Pirata =

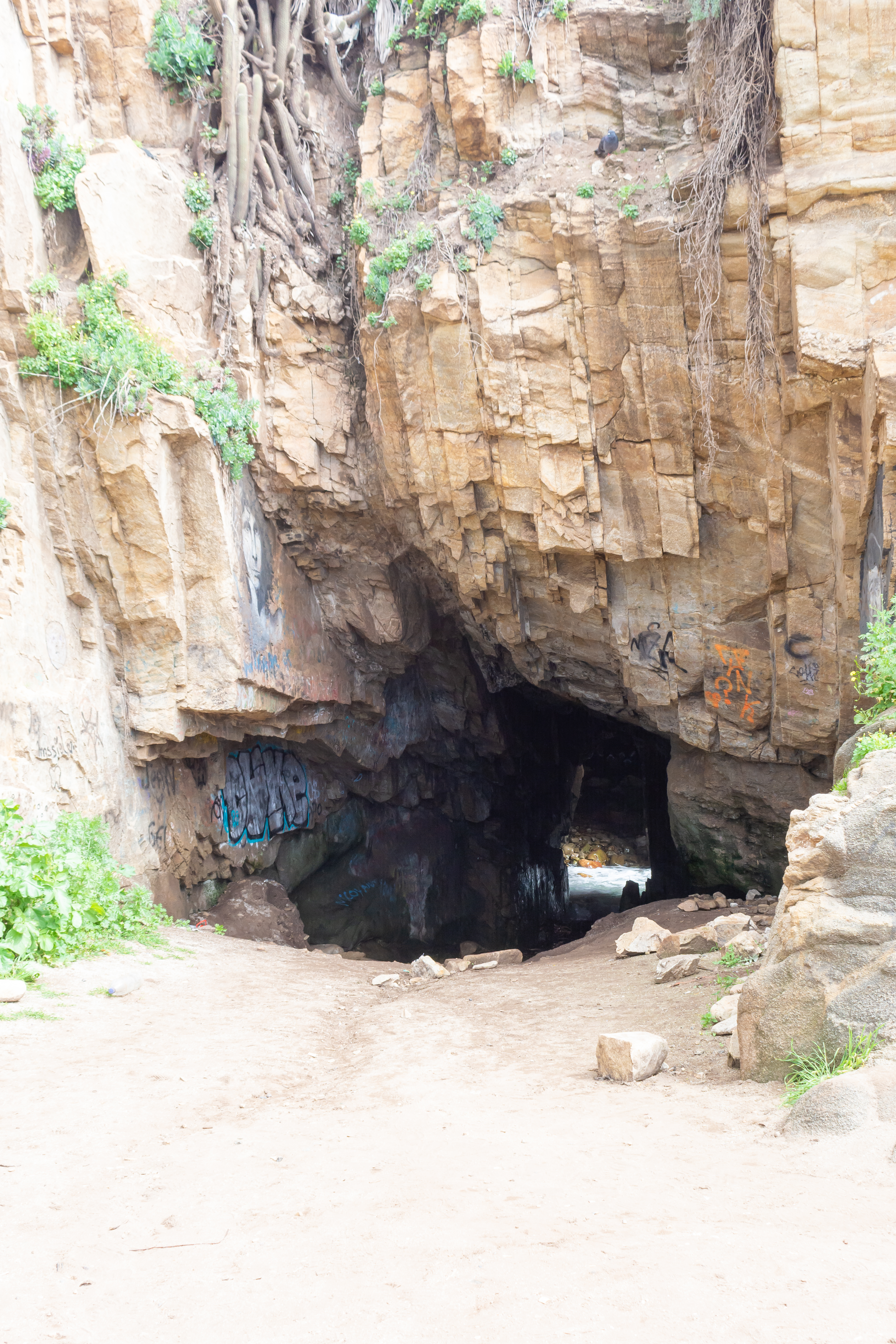
Cueva del Pirata, Quintero, September 2023

Cueva del Pirata, Spanish for "Cave of the Pirate" is a sea cave in the town of Quintero, near Valparaíso, Chile.

In Valparaíso folklore associates the cave with Francis Drake. One version says that when Drake sacked the port he became disappointed over the scant plunder. Drake proceeded to enter the churches in fury to sack them and urinate on the goblets. However he still found the plunder to be not worth enough to take it on board his galleon, hiding it in the cave. Another version says a treasure was left in the cave because the plunder had been more than he could take on board. Together with the treasure Drake would have left a man chained or a sentry to wait for them to return, which they did not. The treasure is said to still be there, but those who approach it drown.

It has been suggested that the rocky shore near the cave bears evidence of human activity dating to the Paleolithic.
