= Cornish Gilliflower =

Apple cultivar

Malus domestica 'Cornish Gilliflower'
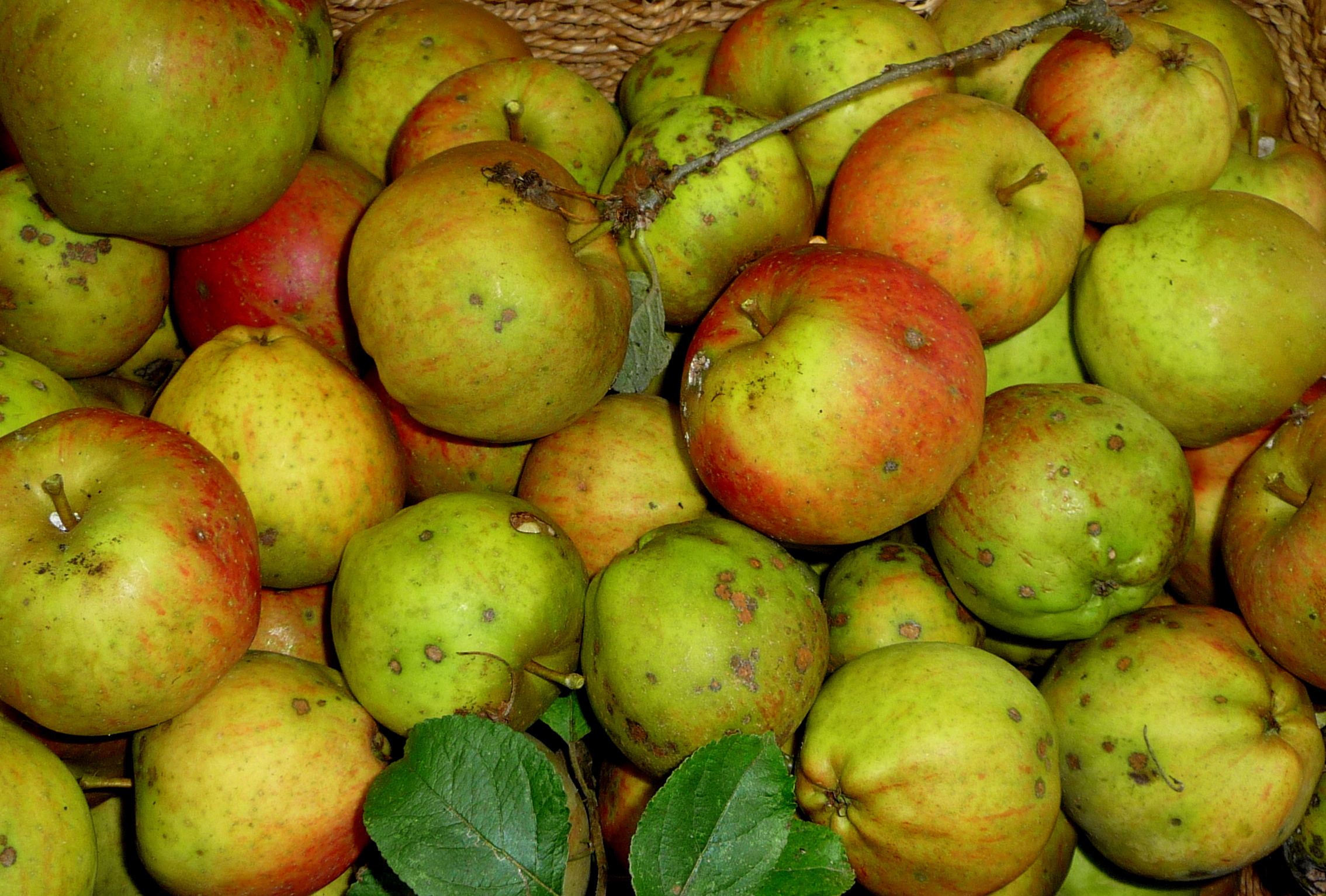
- Cultivar: 'Cornish Gilliflowerr'
- Origin: introduced 1813

The Cornish Gilliflower is a cultivar of apple.

This cultivar was found in a cottage garden in Truro, Cornwall, England, in about 1800 and in 1813 was brought to the attention of the Royal Horticultural Society by Sir Christopher Hawkins, who was awarded a silver medal "for his exertions". The word 'gilliflower' is possibly a corruption of a French word girofle meaning clove, believed to be a reference to its odour when cut. The leaves are small and the tree is not a strong grower. It ripens in October.

The Cornish Gillyflower is used as a base for comparison by the RHS fruit committee to gauge the flavour of other apples.
