= Portreath Tramroad =

Waggonway in Cornwall, England

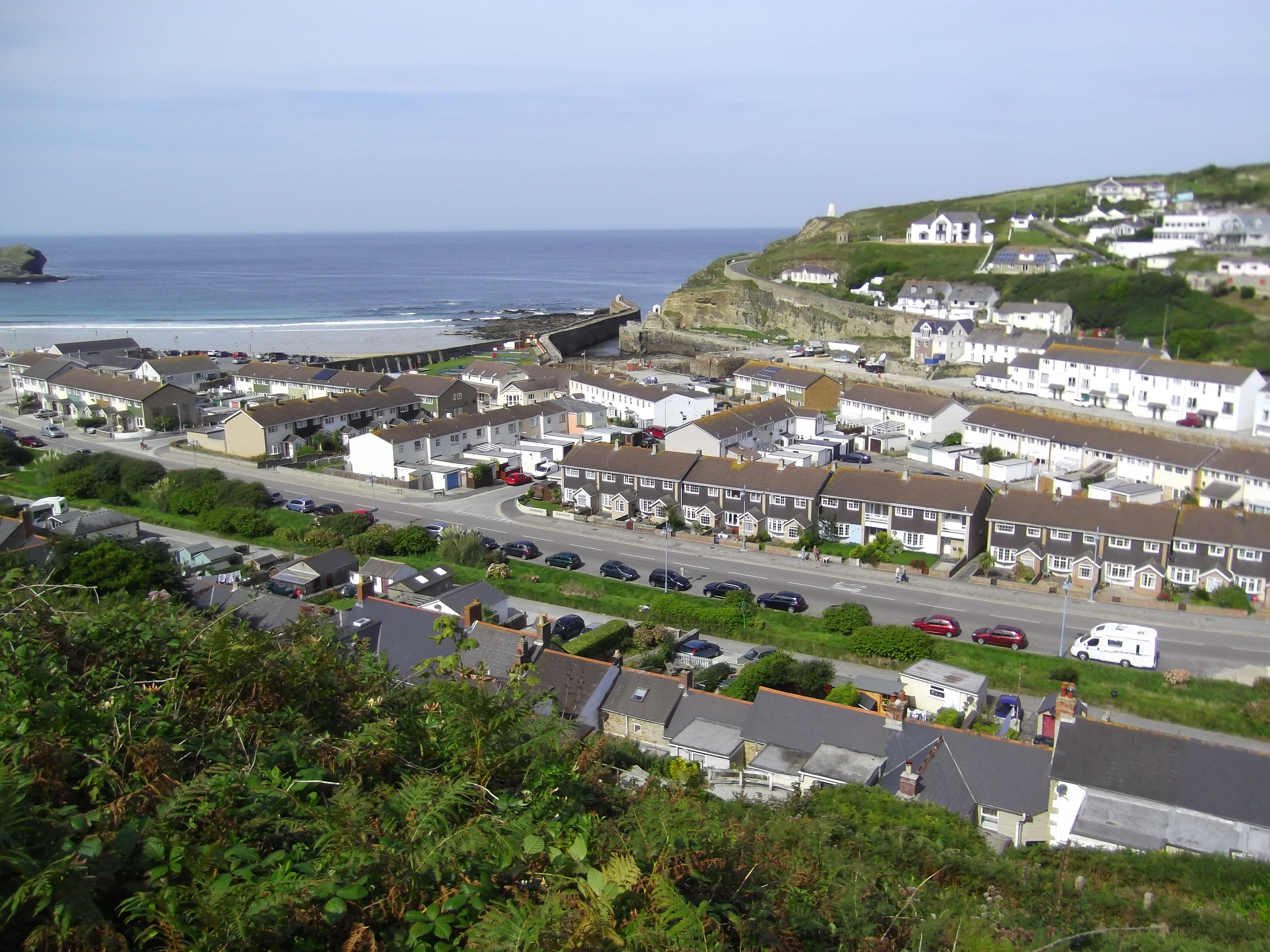
View of Portreath Harbour; the tramroad approached from the right centre of the picture, between the two rows of white-faced houses

The Portreath Tramroad, or alternatively the Portreath Tramway, was opened in 1815, providing a waggonway route from mines near Scorrier in Cornwall, England, to a port at Portreath. From there, it could be transported to market by coastal shipping. It was later extended to serve the Poldice mine near St Day and became known as the Poldice Tramroad, or Poldice Tramway.

It was a horse-drawn plateway and was the first railway in the county of Cornwall, starting operation in 1809.

As a technological pioneer, it soon became technically obsolescent but continued in use until about 1865. Much of the route can be discerned today, and parts can be walked or cycled.

== History ==
=== Early technology ===
From the sixteenth century, minerals—chiefly copper—had been extracted southeast of Scorrier in Cornwall, England. The smelting of copper ore required about ten times its weight in coal, and the practice was to transport the ore to a location where there was a ready coal supply and carry out the smelting there. In the 18th century the Cornish ore was mainly taken to Swansea, earning it the nickname Copperopolis. A small harbour was built at Portreath sometime between 1713 and 1753. The ore was exported, and coal and timber were brought in to serve the mining activity and the lime kilns. In 1824, the harbour was further improved.

The heavy materials were conveyed the few miles between the mines and the port by pack horse or mule, an expensive and time-consuming means of transport. Seeking an improved means of transport, in 1798 (Francis Basset), "Paid Mr. John Williams subscription towards planning a canal from Portreath £10. 10s. 0d".

The canal was not proceeded with: water supply may have been a problem. In the immediately following years, alternative technologies were being developed. Richard Trevithick had demonstrated his steam road carriage, the Puffing Devil, at Camborne in 1801. The following year, he constructed a practical steam hammer at the Penydarren Ironworks and converted it into a self-propelled locomotive. In a demonstration, it successfully hauled a load of ten tons over 10 miles (16 km).

=== A tramroad for Portreath ===
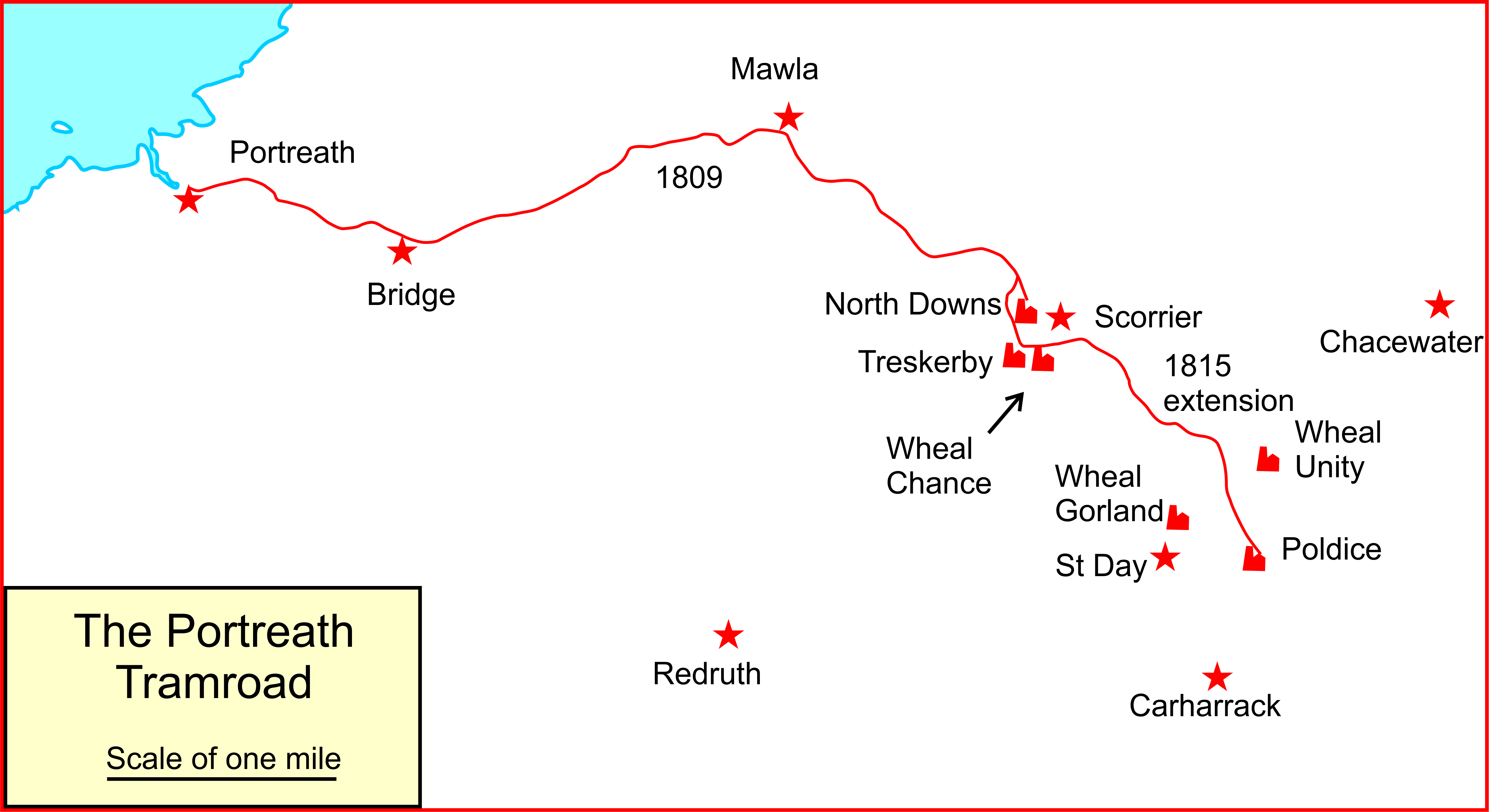
Map of the Portreath Tramroad

These developments encouraged Basset and Williams to collaborate in projecting a tramroad, and The Portreath Tram Road Company was created by them and their partners, with a capital of £20,000. The first "rail" was laid by Bassett on 25 October 1809. The line was a wagonway, in which cast iron plates of L-shaped cross-section were laid on stone blocks. Wagons with plain wheels ran on the flat of the L and were guided by the upstand; horses pulled the wagons, walking between the plates.

R. Hansford Worth quotes Mr Francis Mitchell, C.E., of Redruth, in saying (in 1888) that "The line has been taken up, and that it consisted of two angle irons, placed face to face, and not back to back as was usual [on later lines]... These irons were fastened to stone blocks, and the gauge was about 3 ft."

Mitchell may have mistaken the track gauge: three feet is remarkably narrow for a non-mountain tramroad; Otter (page 9) gives 4 ft, as does Fairclough (page 7); Symons, Barton, and Thomas are silent on the matter; Baxter (page 208) says "3 ft 0 in gauge (possibly)".

This was the first railway in Cornwall, but as it was a plateway, some claim that the later Redruth and Chasewater Railway was the first true railway in the county.

The Company (or its proprietors) also owned the harbour, and the use of the tramroad and the harbour was exclusive to them. Initially, it was laid as far as North Downs, near Scorrier, and a storage yard was built there. There was a branch to Treskerby, serving the mine there and Wheal Chance.

This first portion of the line was in use by 1812. Between 1815 and 1819, it was extended to Crofthandy, serving Poldice, Wheal Unity, and Wheal Gorland mines. Including the branch to Treskerby, the line cost about £20,000. There was no provision for passengers.

=== A monopoly—at first ===
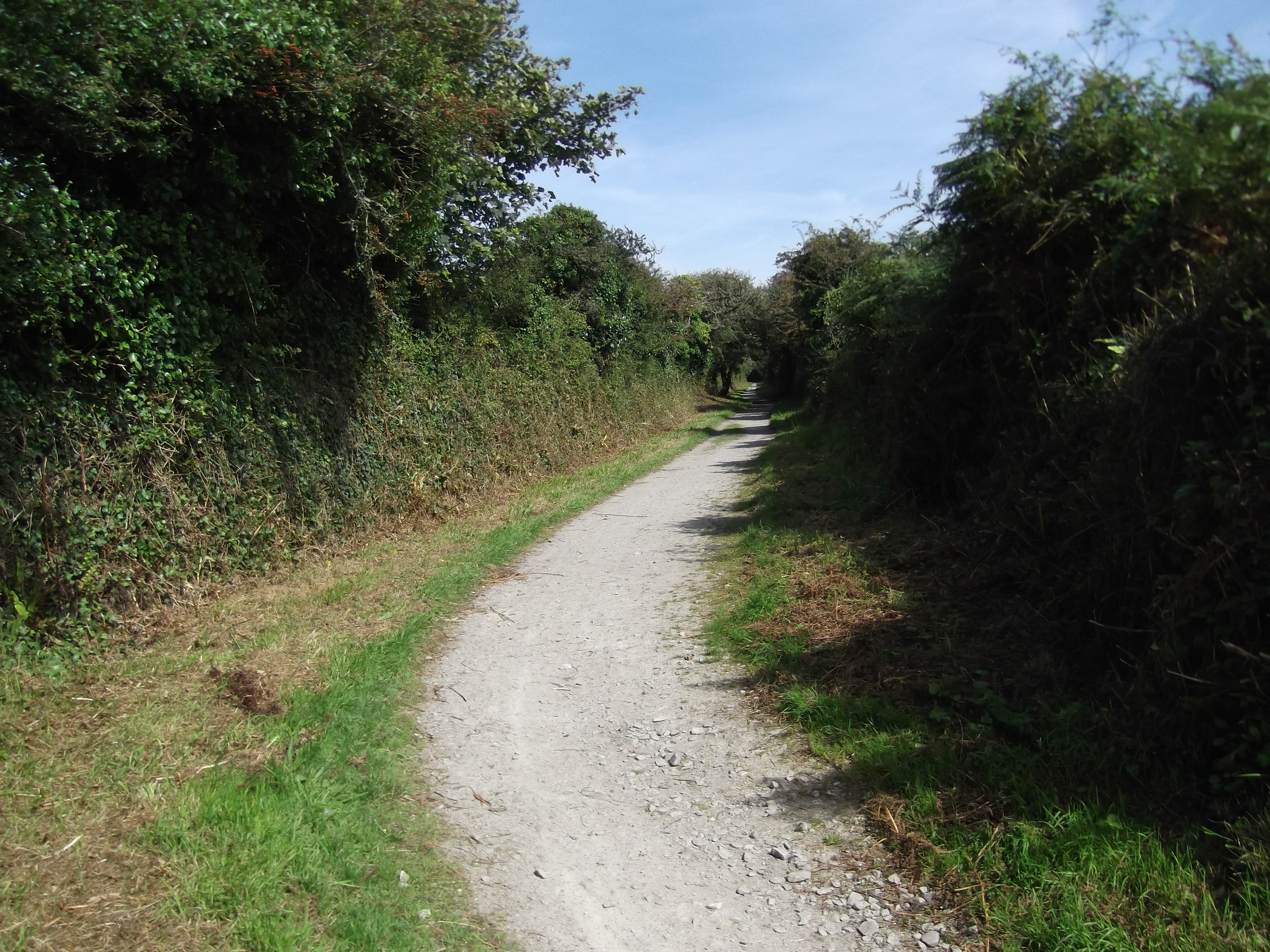
The track of the Portreath Tramroad near Bridge, Cornwall

The proprietors of Portreath Harbour, and the tramroad, permitted only their mines to use those facilities, and for some years, this gave them an enormous competitive advantage. The mines were at their most productive, and the facility of conveying minerals cheaply to the harbour was extremely valuable. Mines "such as Poldice, Wheal Unity, Wheal Gorland, Carharrack and Wheal Maid probably sent ores over the Portreath tram-road, but all the others would ship almost entirely from Devoran."

Rival mine owners were placed at a huge disadvantage, and this led to the development of Devoran Harbour on the south coast of Cornwall and the promotion of the Redruth and Chasewater Railway to reach it; that railway opened in 1825. In time the mining areas served by the tramroad and the railway were closely associated, but Devoran had the disadvantage of being on the English Channel side of Cornwall, so the crossing to Swansea involved a longer and sometimes hazardous passage around Land's End.

The Hayle Railway opened a standard gauge railway to Portreath in 1837, and in 1855 the Redruth and Chasewater Railway introduced steam locomotives. A local correspondent to the Mining Journal in 1855 described the Portreath Tramroad as "altogether a wretched road." (Note: This quote is in a footnote in Barton, page 47, referencing the Mining Journal in 1855, but the original quotation cannot be found there.)

=== Decline of mining activity ===
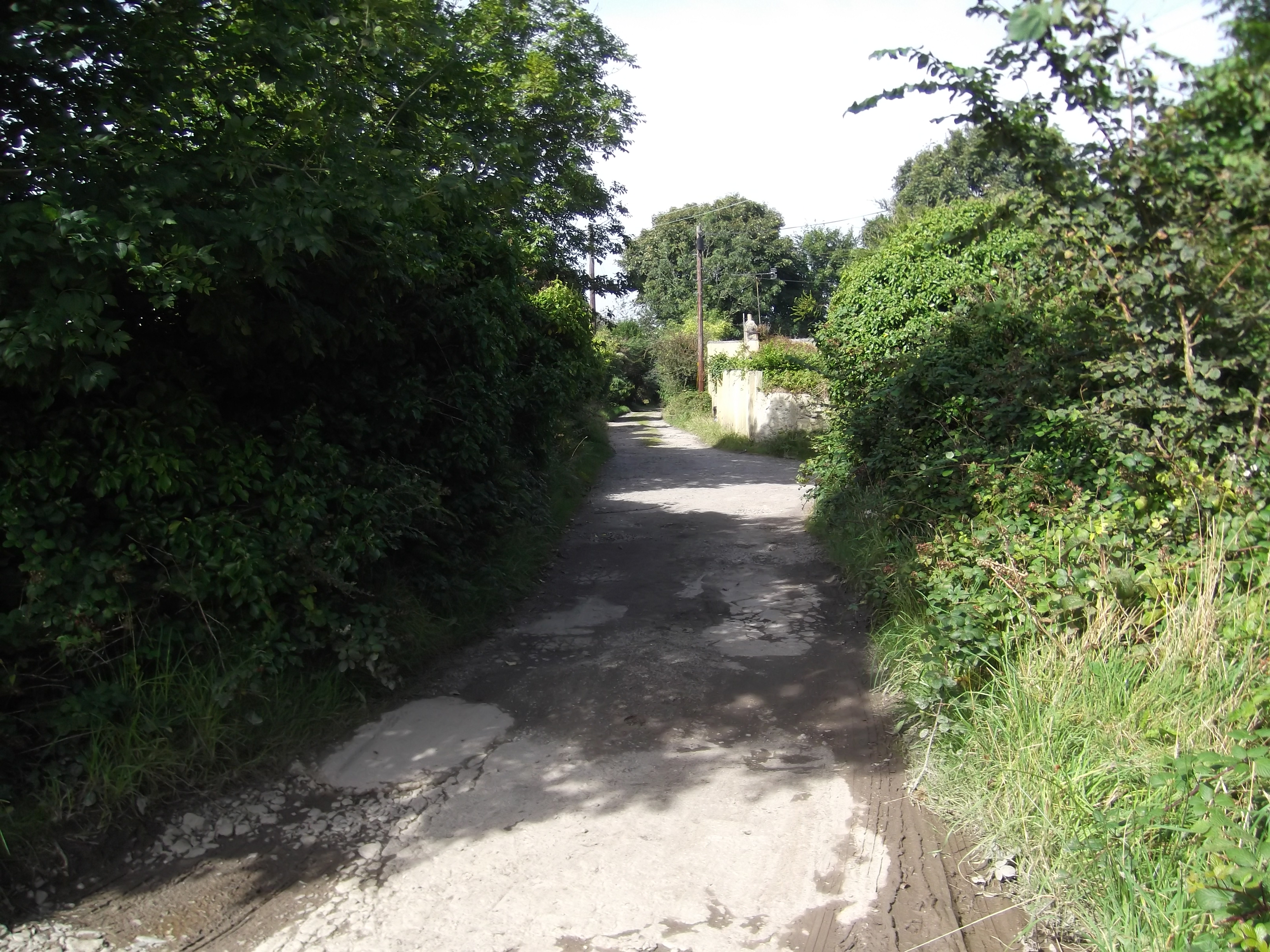
The track of the Portreath Tramroad near St Day

The tramroad was entirely dependent on the activity of the mines it served. In the 1860s, large, easily worked deposits of the minerals started to be extracted in Spain and elsewhere, and the Cornish mines became uneconomic to operate. The tramroad was little used by 1865 and was closed completely soon after, the tramplates being taken up and sold for scrap around 1882.

Much of the route is now a bridleway, forming part of the Cornish Mineral Tramway Trails route for walkers, cyclists, and horse-riders.

== 1884 description ==
Symons described the line in retrospect, writing in 1884:

The first tramway laid down in Cornwall, is that connecting Portreath with Poldice mine, near St Day. Its construction was started about the year 1809, when most of the Gwennap mines were in full operation; as was also North Downs in Redruth. It was much in use till the stoppage of Poldice and the adjacent mines about 20 years ago. At present, [it] is not very much wanted, and [it] is in a very dilapidated state. In 1830 the writer rode in a car to a Portreath tea party, of which party he is the only survivor.

== Directors' wagon ==
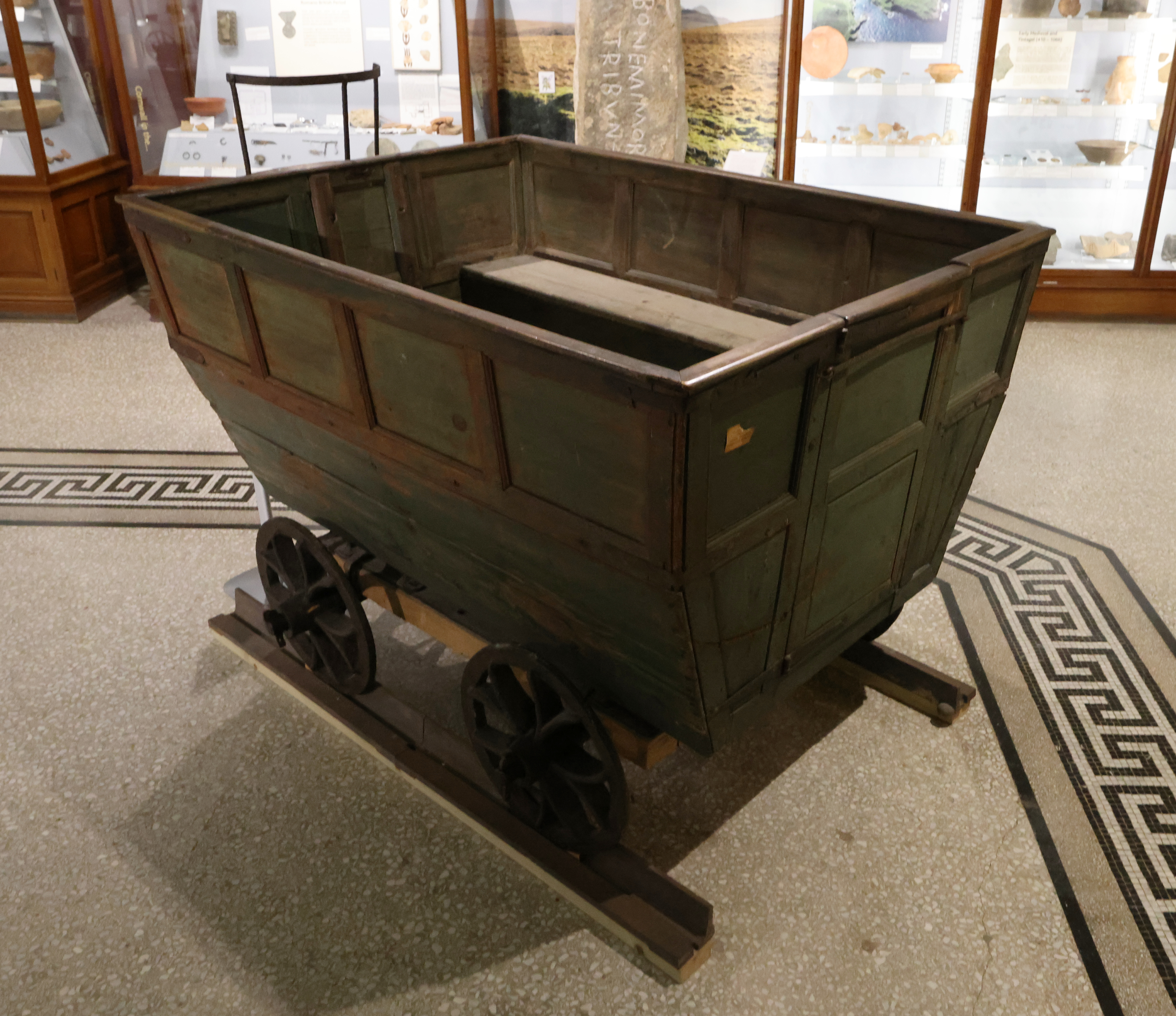
Tramroad director's wagon

A small wagon fitted with two bench seats has survived. It is believed to have been used to carry the tramroad's directors.

== See also ==
- Transport in Cornwall
- Poldice mine
- Redruth and Chasewater Railway
- Mining in Cornwall and Devon
