= Redruth and Chasewater Railway =

Railway in UK

Overview
- Headquarters: Devoran
- Locale: England, UK
- Dates of operation: 1825–1915
- Successor: Abandoned

Technical
- Track gauge: 4 ft (1,219 mm)
- Length: 9 miles (14 km)

The Redruth and Chasewater Railway was an early mineral railway line in Cornwall, UK. It opened in 1825 and was built to convey the output from copper mines in the Gwennap area to wharves on Restronguet Creek (off the Fal Estuary) around Devoran, and to bring in coal to fuel mine engines; later it carried timber for pit props and also house coal.

A little over 9 miles (14 km) long, it was built to a 4 ft (1,219 mm) narrow gauge and used horse traction at first, later using steam locomotives. Solely dependent on the economy of the mines it served, it prospered when they did, and when they declined, the railway declined too; it finally closed in 1915. It never carried passengers.

Much of its route can still be traced, and part of it forms the course of the Redruth and Chasewater Railway Trail, an outdoor leisure facility.

== History ==
=== Antecedents ===
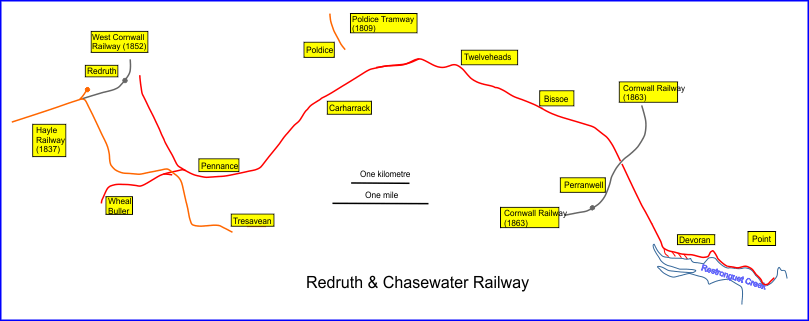
System map of the Redruth & Chasewater Railway

Prior to the nineteenth century, much mineral extraction had taken place in the Cornish peninsula, but this had been limited by the non-existence of industrial methods; thus the depth to which shafts could be sunk, and at which water inundation overwhelmed the workings, and the cost of transporting extracted minerals to market, all proved limiting factors, and many mines were abandoned as exhausted using available methods. (Transport of minerals was chiefly done on the backs of mules.)

As the industrial revolution gathered pace, steam engine power became available to overcome these limitations, and new seams were developed at greater depths, and in some cases abandoned mines were re-opened. Moreover copper began to supersede tin as the dominant mineral for exploitation. Because the process of smelting copper required large quantities of coal – in the proportion of 18 to 1 – the copper ore was transported by sea to South Wales, where Swansea was dominant.

The focus, then, was on transporting copper and tin ore to a sea port for onward movement, and to bring in coal to fuel the increasing number of steam engines operating at the mines. In 1809 a privately owned tramway was constructed to connect the harbour at Portreath on the north coast, with mines around St Day and Scorrier; at first called the Portreath Tramway, with later extensions it became known as the Poldice Tramway. It was a horse-worked plateway and it was an immediate success financially. However it was in private ownership, as was the harbour at Portreath, and was not made available to the proprietors of competing mines.

=== Consolidated Mines ===
In 1819, the dynamic entrepreneur John Taylor took a lease on the dormant Consolidated Mines (usually referred to as Consols). These were a group of five mines that had been abandoned in 1811 and flooded, and Taylor installed two 90-inch (2,300 mm) pumping engines – then the largest of their kind in the world – and within a year opened a 1 mile (1.6 km) long copper lode, itself the largest in the world. Consols had become the prime copper mine in Cornwall, and remained so until 1840, gaining its shareholders huge capital gains.

The issue of transporting the extracted minerals to market had always been prominent, and canal and other schemes had been proposed but never implemented, and Taylor now promoted a railway to transport his mine's output to Point on Restronguet Creek. He obtained financial backing in London without any support from Cornish interests.

=== The railway gets its act ===
Redruth and Chasewater Railway Act 1824
- Act of Parliament
- Parliament of the United Kingdom
- Long title: An Act for making and maintaining a Railway or Tramroad from the Town of Redruth in the County of Cornwall, to Point Quay in the Parish of Feock, in the same County, with several Branches therefrom; and also for restoring, improving and maintaining the Navigation of Restrongett Creek, in the same County.
- Citation: 5 Geo. 4. c. cxxi

Dates
- Royal assent: 17 June 1824

Notwithstanding obstruction from the Portreath interests, Taylor got his act of Parliament, the Redruth and Chasewater Railway Act 1824 (5 Geo. 4. c. cxxi), on 17 June 1824, with a capital of £22,500, and authority to increase this by another £10,000 if necessary. The railway was to be a toll operation, allowing any carrier to convey his vehicles on the line on payment of the toll, and the terms of the act did not envisage actual train operation by the company itself.

The act specified the main line to be from Redruth (50°14′02″N 5°13′20″W) to Point (50°12′31″N 5°05′06″W), with several branches, including one from Twelveheads to Chacewater. There were also to be improvements to the harbour at Narabo (near Devoran). The route went via Carharrack and down the Carnon Valley, via Bissoe.

=== Construction and opening ===
Actual construction of the railway proceeded swiftly, being conducted by William Brunton, son of the Scottish inventor of the same name. Considerable earthworks were necessary in places – crossing the Carnon Valley in particular – in order to avoid excessive gradients, and there was a 600-foot (183 m) vertical interval between the summit of the line and the wharves at Devoran. In fact there was a gradient of 1 in 35 (28.6‰) falling from Lanner to Carharrack.

The track gauge was 4 ft (1,219 mm) this was commonly employed in South Wales, with which the engineering of the mines had close contact at that time, and edge rails were used: a considerable technical advance, and the first such use in Cornwall (The Poldice and other tramways had used plateways, in which the plates are flanged and the wagon wheels are plain; in an edge rail system, the flanges are on the wheels of the vehicles). The rails were wrought iron, carried in cast iron chairs supported on granite blocks.

As parts of the line were completed, hauliers were allowed to use them forthwith, and this took place from 1824; it was not until 30 January 1826 that the line was considered substantially complete (although the Chacewater branch had not been started, and in fact was never built) and an official opening took place, when some of the proprietors travelled from Wheal Buller to Devoran (by gravity) and then back to Redruth (pulled by a horse).

In 1827 extensions were constructed and opened; from Wheal Buller junction to Redruth itself, serving the Pen-an-Drea mine and the town itself, and an additional 1 mile (1.6 km) from Devoran to Point Quay.

=== Operation: first years ===
Built as a horse-operated tramway, the early operations followed that model, with short groups of wagons hauled by horses. Although the line had been designed with a view to gravitational operation for loaded traffic towards Devoran, it appears that this was not done, and the wagons were hauled in both directions.

The line was single throughout, with numerous passing places. In the event of two "trains" meeting between passing places, the advantage was to be decided by lot.

Tonnages carried exceeded expectations, at over 58,000 long tons (65,000 short tons; 59,000 t) annually and the company was financially very successful, with annual profits of over £2,000. Additional passing places were installed in 1831 and the wharves at Devoran were much extended.

Renewal of rails became necessary in 1831 – this on a railway with no locomotive traction – and considerable difficulty was experienced with displacement of the stone blocks, causing gauge widening problems.

Inwards traffic of coal steadily increased as the mines mechanised: by 1835 Consols and United mines had sixteen engines working, consuming 15,000 tons of coal annually.

=== First challenges ===
In 1839, the West Cornwall Railway opened its lines, to Tresavean, near the mines served by the Redruth company, and to Portreath, giving improved access to that port, which gave easier access to Welsh ports as it lay on the north coast of Cornwall.

In the same year, Taylor's lease of the Consols mines came to an end; in the final months he extracted as much material as possible without the development work normally used to maintain future extraction, and when the new lessees took over, they found it impossible to maintain the volume of extraction that Taylor had achieved. This directly affected the railway's carryings and its profitability.

In 1840 profits fell by 20%, though with increased tonnages carried, reflecting the downward pressure of rates. In the following year, a severe winter led to great difficulties with displacement of the stone blocks, and with embankment subsidence, costing considerable expenditure on repairs.

In 1848 Thomas Hall was appointed engineer and superintendent of the railway for the next 20 years.

=== Locomotive operation ===
Redruth Railway Act 1853
- Act of Parliament
- Parliament of the United Kingdom
- Long title: An Act to enable the Redruth and Chasewater Railway Company to construct new Works; and for other Purposes.
- Citation: 16 & 17 Vict. c. vi

Dates
- Royal assent: 9 May 1853

Other legislation
- Repealed by: Cornwall County Council Act 1984

Status: Repealed

Text of statute as originally enacted

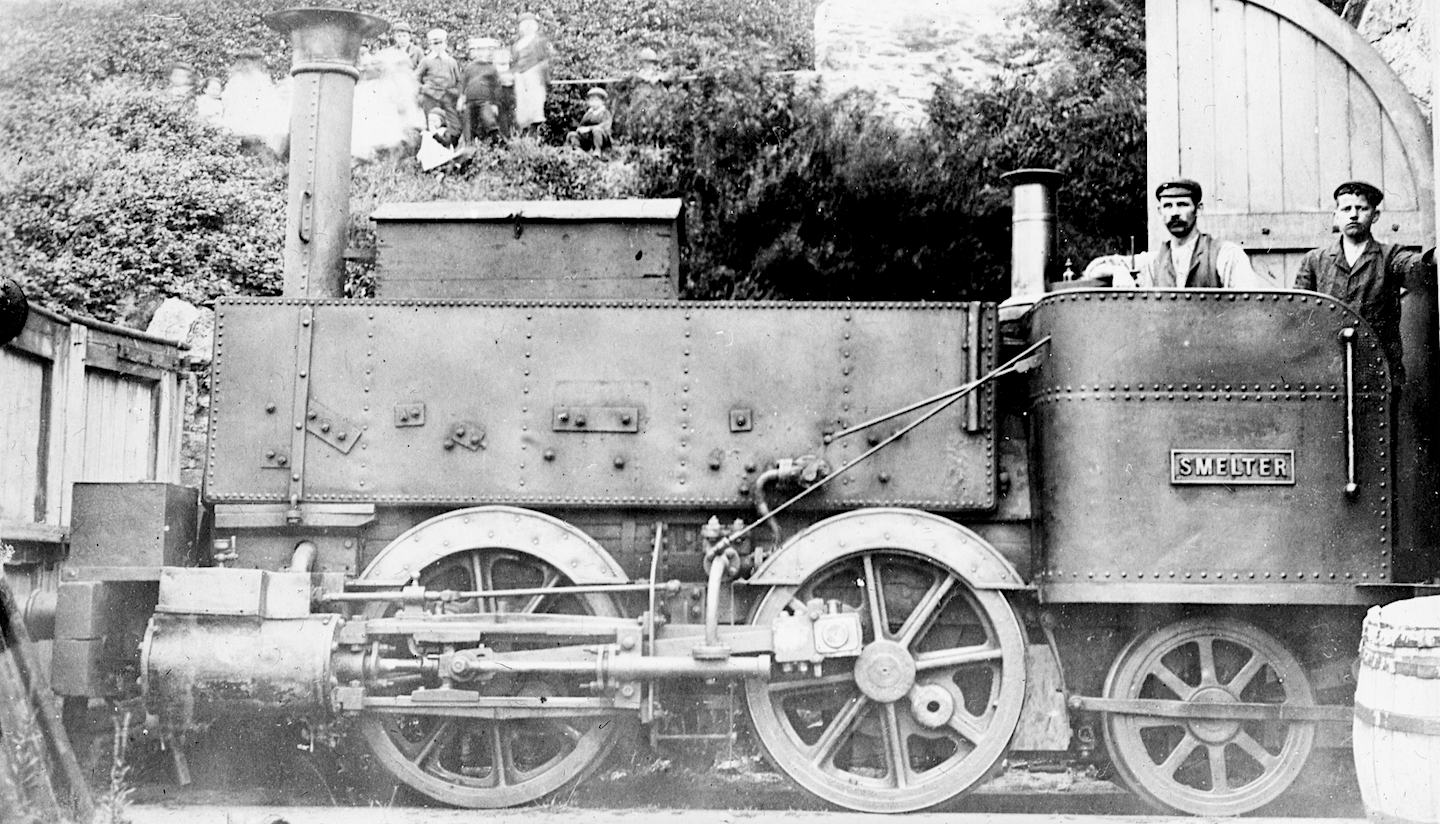
Neilson and Company 04-2-ST box tank locomotive "Smelter"

By the early 1850s, trade in general was more buoyant, and the company decided to apply for parliamentary authority to build a branch line to Wheal Busy (a little over 2 miles (3.2 km) long). The junction was to be near Hale Mills, and the Redruth Railway Act 1853 (16 & 17 Vict. c. vi) was obtained on 9 May 1853, but this line was never completed.

The act also permitted the use of locomotives. This necessitated the relaying of much of the track, and this was done with 50-pound-per-yard (25 kg/m) bullhead rails, re-using the original stone blocks. Two locomotives were acquired from Neilson & Co. They were named Miner and Smelter; they were 0-4-2STs and they were delivered in November 1854. New larger capacity wagons were also acquired with a payload of over 4 tons. The new locomotives and wagons cost £5,565.

Although crude in appearance, the locomotives were successful operationally, being able to take 8 loaded wagons (50 long tons (56 short tons; 51 t) gross) up to Wheal Fortune loop. However locomotive operation caused considerable friction with the existing horse hauliers, who operated the upper part of the line; in addition the weight of the locomotives caused subsidence problems in the weaker parts of the track.

In 1855 the company made a loss of £548. This was taken hard, although it was brought about by the considerable expenditure on one-off items (charged to current account) — the locomotives and rolling stock, the work on the Wheal Busy extension, and major repairs to the company's steam tug, kept at Devoran.

The locomotives were now regularly working up to Tingtang (west of the Consols); traffic was increasing markedly on the Wheal Buller branch (and declining on the Redruth main line) and the decision was taken to operate the locomotives to Wheal Buller, involving relaying the track, as soon as the traffic justified it. In fact this was done by 1857, and they took over operation of the whole line.

The locomotives were worked very hard and continuously, and in 1858 a decision was taken to acquire a third: in September 1859 Spitfire, an 0-6-0ST from Neilson started work. She usually operated the section above Nangiles loop, making four round trips daily, with the earlier locomotives feeding traffic up to her. The traffic was almost entirely coal upwards and copper ore downwards. Shunting on the quays at Devoran, and on the eastward extension to Point, was in the charge of horses.

=== Decline of copper extraction ===
By the late 1860s copper mining in the area was declining, and by 1870 it became a depression, when the Clifford Amalgamated Mines closed. This resulted in a disastrous loss of income, and decline continued. Catastrophe struck in the heavy winter of 1876–77 when the Great County Adit (a common drainage system formerly used by several deep mines) which had fallen into disrepair and become blocked, suddenly burst and caused the instant silting of Devoran Harbour, forcing vessels to discharge by tender.

It was plain that the company had no trading future, and on 18 July 1879 it passed into receivership, continuing to trade, however.

== Miscellaneous ==
Today the restored Count House of Old Wheal Buller Mine overlooks the trackbeds of two early and unrecorded sidings, and beyond, to the Buller branch of the railway).

=== Route ===
Writing in 1831, Priestley said:

The main line of this railway commences at the extensive tin works on the east side of the town of Redruth, whence it takes a south-easterly course round the mountain of Cam Marth; thence north-easterly by Carrarath to Twelve Heads, whence it takes a south-eastward course by Nangiles and Carnon Gate to Point Quay, situate on an estuary branching out of Carreg Road. Its length is nine miles, two furlongs and four chains; in the first mile and seven chains of which, to Wheel [sic] Beauchamp, there is a rise of 103 feet; from thence to its termination it is one gradual inclination with a fall of 555 feet to high-water-mark. From Carnon Gate there is a branch to Narrabo of one mile one furlong; another branch from Nangiles to Wheel Fortune of three furlongs and five chains; another from Twelve Heads to Wheel Bissey, two miles, two furlongs and five chains in length; and another from Wheel Beauchamp to Wheel Buller, of two furlongs four chains in length. The total length of main line and branches is thirteen miles, three furlongs and eight chains.

Reference Kidner

- Redruth (Gwennap pit) 0 miles (0 km)
- Lanner 1 1/2 miles (2.4 km)
  - branch to Wheal Bassett mine
- Carharrack 3 miles (4.8 km)
- Hale Mills
  - uncompleted branch to Chacewater
- Bissoe 6 miles (9.7 km)
- Devoran 8 miles (12.9 km)
- Penpol 9 miles (14.5 km)

=== Success ===
Initially the line was generally successful. It served both Great Consols and United Mines, the two largest in the area, and traffic by the 1830s was well in excess of 60,000 tons annually with the company reporting profits approaching £3,000. Copper ore transported down to ships for onward movement to South Wales was supplemented by coal carried in the other direction to serve the ever-deeper mines.

Initially the railway company had not been carriers, and up to 1854 the line was worked throughout by horses, but in November 1854 two tank engines, Miner and Smelter were delivered and began working between Devoran and Carharrack, making the Redruth and Chasewater one of the first narrow gauge railways to introduce steam locomotives. They were delivered as 0-4-0ST's, but were rough riders due to excessive overhang at the rear, so were soon rebuilt as 0-4-2ST's. At this time the remainder of the railway was operated by the company's own horses. By 1859 traffic had increased to 90,000 tons annually leading to the acquisition of a third engine, Spitfire. Spitfire was named after an incident where Miner and Smelter working hard uphill would scatter cinders and sparks. As a result, a nearby thatched cottage was in danger. The company was persuaded to rebuild it at a safe distance from the line and replace the thatch with slates. The owner was a valued shareholder in the company. The acquisition of Spitfire enabled the whole line from Devoran to Redruth to be worked by steam except the final 1 1/2 miles (2.4 km) from Devoran to Point Quay which remained horse-worked until final closure.

=== Decline ===
The railway workshops, like the offices, were located in Devoran, and Miner was substantially rebuilt here in 1869, but traffic began to decline as the copper mines closed and in 1879 a receiver was appointed. Smelter was relegated to the status of reserve engine; but lack of maintenance meant that the line deteriorated and derailments were common. Spitfire was rebuilt, but this was a disaster compared to that of Miner. A new firebox was ordered, it was slightly too big, and apparently the frames were forced apart to accommodate it, with subsequent wear on the rear springs and bearings.

The coming of the Great Western Railway (GWR) eventually ended the R&C as the last major customer of the R&C, Basset Mines, switched to using the GWR. The R&C, in the following six months only carried around 6,500 long tons (7,300 short tons; 6,600 t) of goods as opposed to some 22,000 long tons (25,000 short tons; 22,000 t) for the previous year. The extension to Chacewater that gave the railway its name was never completed despite works starting in 1853. Closure of the line finally came on 25 September 1915 when Miner took the last train down to Devoran. The line was dismantled, locomotives, wagons and rails became scrap.

As the line depended on the mines, so did the port of Devoran rely on the railway, less than a year after its closure, the last commercial vessel called at Devoran.

== Locomotives ==
Name	Builder	Type	Date	Works number	Notes	Image
Miner	Neilson	built as 0-4-0T altered to 0-4-2ST	1854	probably 81	Rebuilt in 1869 as an 0-6-0ST	
Smelter	Neilson	built as 0-4-0T altered to 0-4-2ST	1854	probably 82		
Spitfire	Neilson	0-6-0ST	1859	540		

The three locomotives were of an unusual design. The boiler was surmounted by a square tank from which projected a tall chimney; the cabs were open with sides lower than the top of the tanks.

== Ships ==
In 1848, the company purchased the steam tug Sydney. On 6 March, she sprang a leak and sank at Falmouth.

== Today ==
Most of the route of the railway is now followed by the Redruth and Chacewater Railway Trail which links up with the Great Flat Lode Trail at Redruth. It featured in the BBC TV programme "Railway Walks", first broadcast on BBC Four on 16 October 2008.

== See also ==
- British industrial narrow gauge railways
