= Bridge, Cornwall =

Coordinates: 50.258°N 5.262°W

Bridge: Cornish: Ponsjulyan
- Location within Cornwall
- Civil parish: Portreath
- Unitary authority: Cornwall
- Ceremonial county: Cornwall
- Region: South West
- Country: England
- Sovereign state: United Kingdom
- Post town: Redruth
- Postcode district: TR16
- Police: Devon and Cornwall
- Fire: Cornwall
- Ambulance: South Western

Bridge (Cornish: Ponsjulyan) is a village in Cornwall, England, United Kingdom. It is in the civil parish of Portreath and lies about 1 km east of Portreath village and harbour. The population of Bridge is not recorded separately in censuses, and makes up a small proportion of the 1,581 (estimate, 2018) living in the parish as a whole.

== Geography ==
The main road running through Bridge is the B3300 which connects Portreath to Redruth.

== Toponymy ==
The village is at the site of a historic bridge linking the two sides of the Manor of Nancekuke which were separated by the valley. It was recorded as St Julyan’s Bridge in 1580, St Gilian’s Bridge in 1650, and Tresillian Bridge West (to distinguish from the other Tresillian Bridge crossing the Tresillian River). The bridge was rebuilt in 1797, by which time there was a hamlet of a few houses.

== Landmarks and amenities ==
The Bridge Inn is pub and a grade II listed building dating from the mid or late 19th century. The Coast to Coast Mineral Tramway Trail passes by the village of Bridge, and is used by walkers and cyclists.

=== Previous amenities ===
The village previously had a shop, which closed in 1985 and has never reopened, as of 2020.

Bridge Village Hall, also known as the Institute, was closed and in disrepair as of 2020. The hall, built in 1926 and run by the Bridge Village Hall charity since 1965, was sold in 2021. In 2023, planning permission was given to demolish the hall and build a house on the site.

Bridge Methodist chapel was opened in 1816. Its congregation was merged with two others to form Gateway, Porth an Dre (later Redruth United Methodist Church), and the building was closed in or after 2016. Three churches were to be sold to pay for a new replacement building, with the site in Bridge to be redeveloped for housing.

== Gallery ==
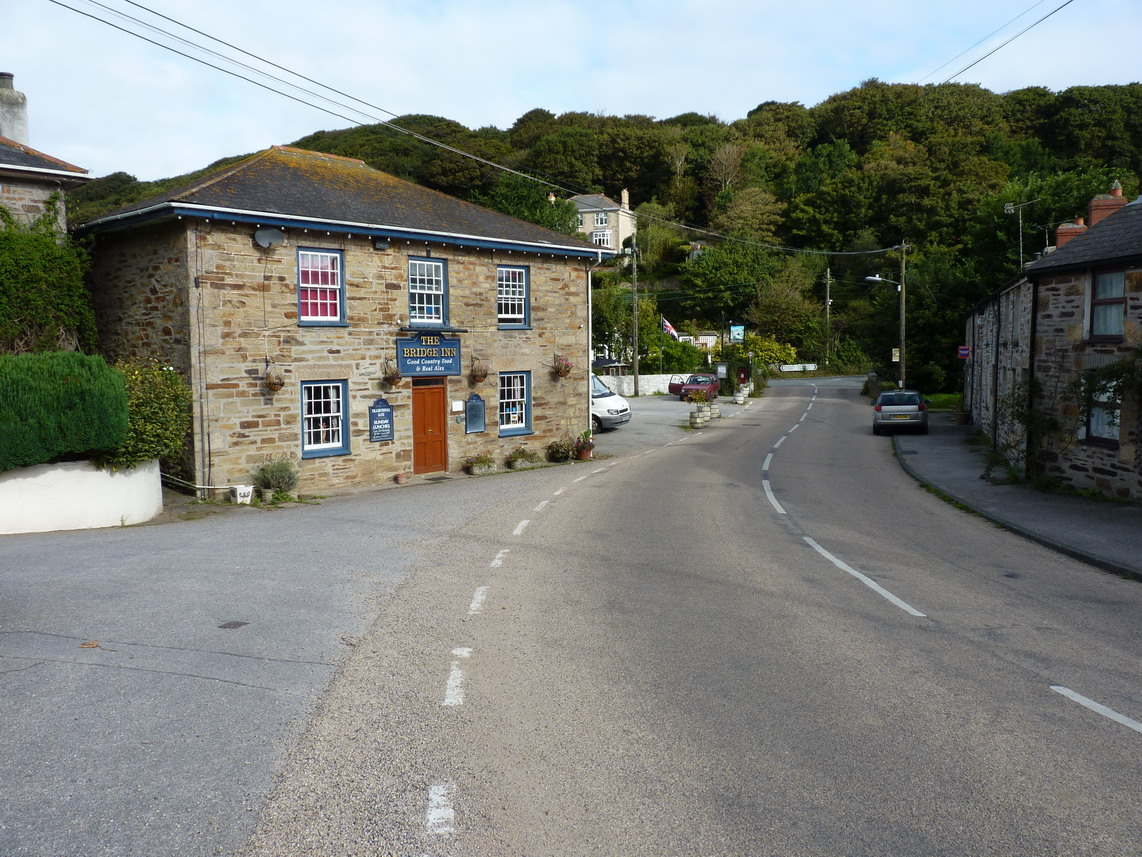
The Bridge Inn pub

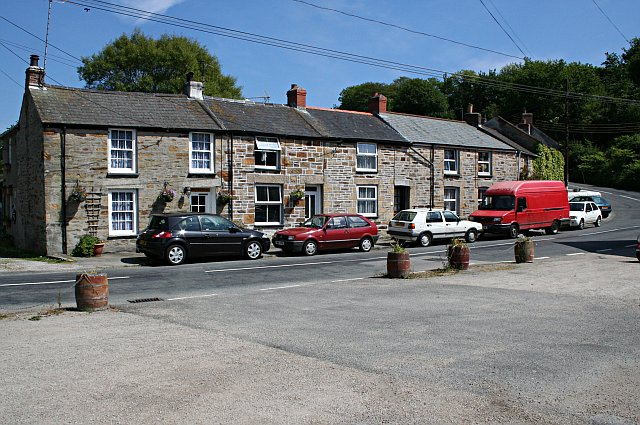
Houses at the bridge

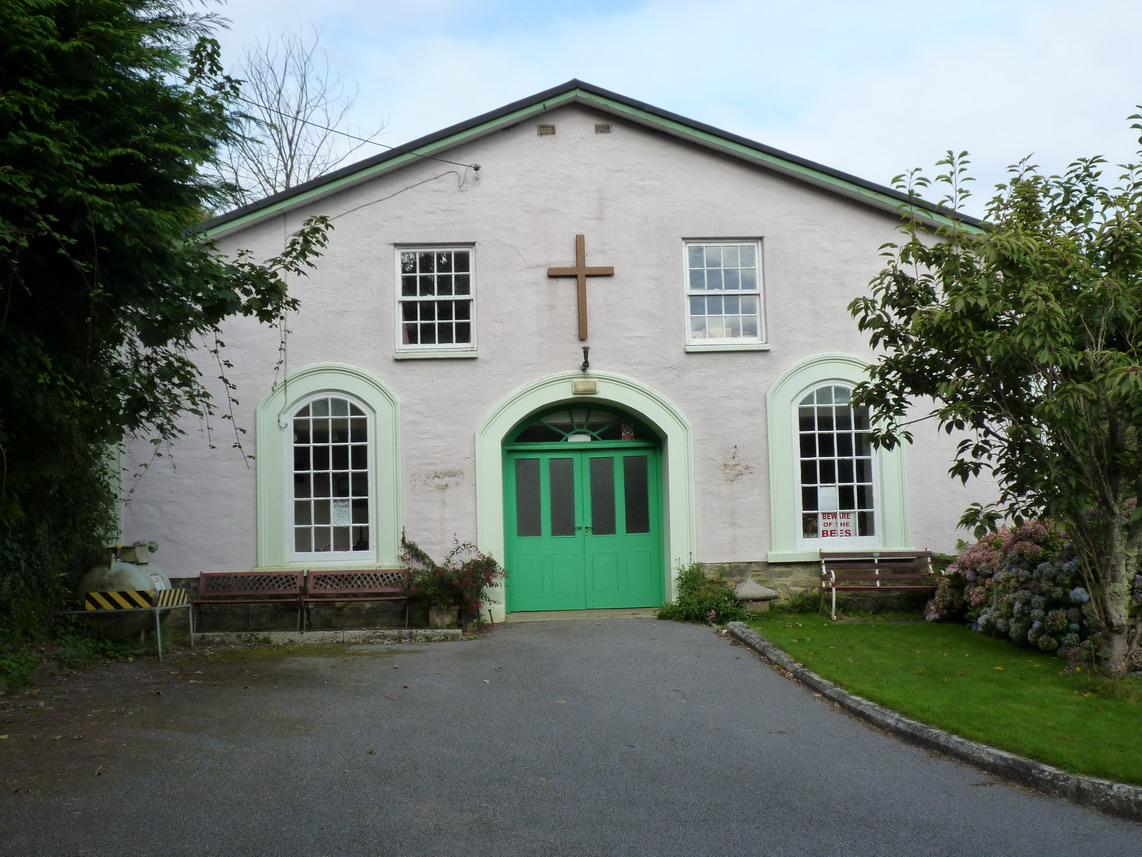
The former Methodist Chapel

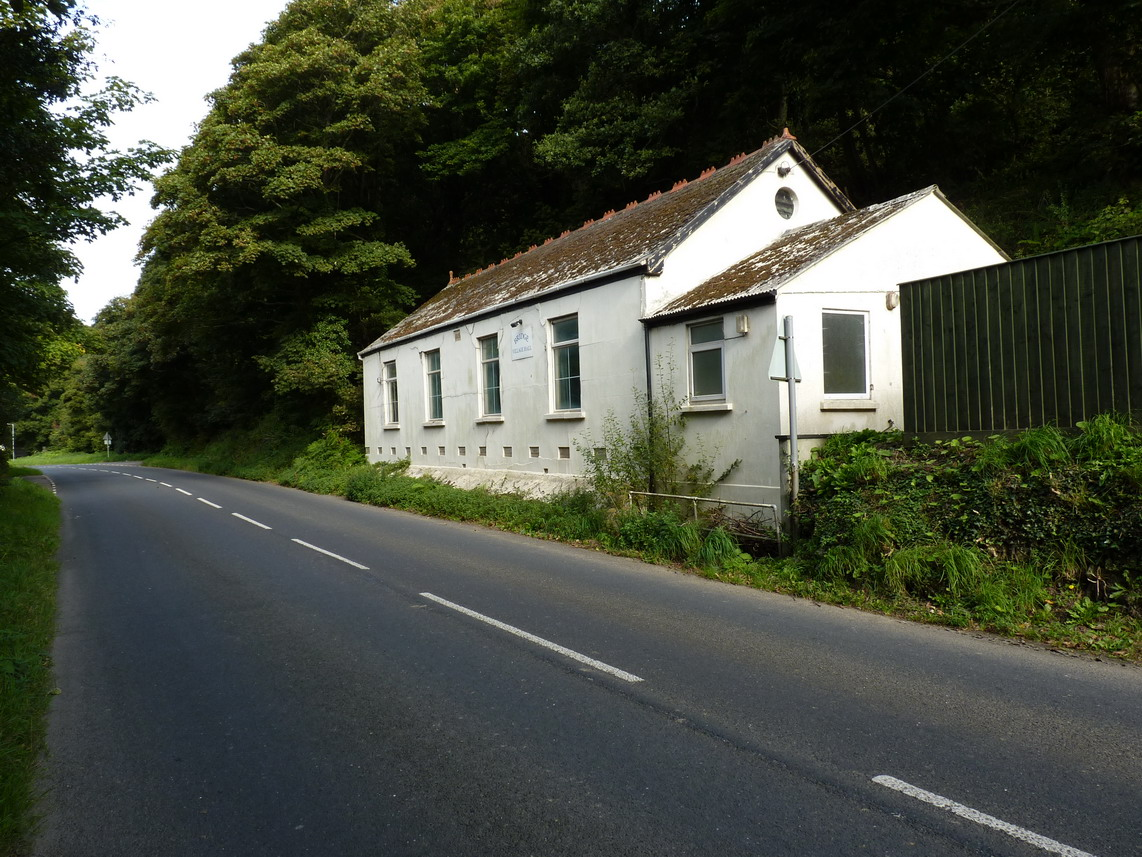
The former village hall

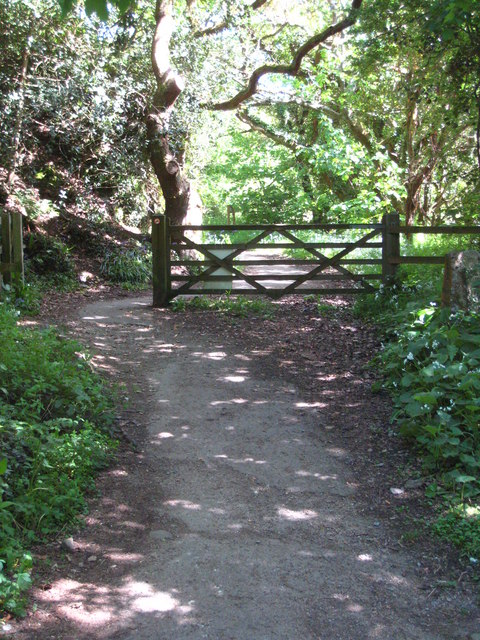
The Porthreath Branchline Trail at Bridge

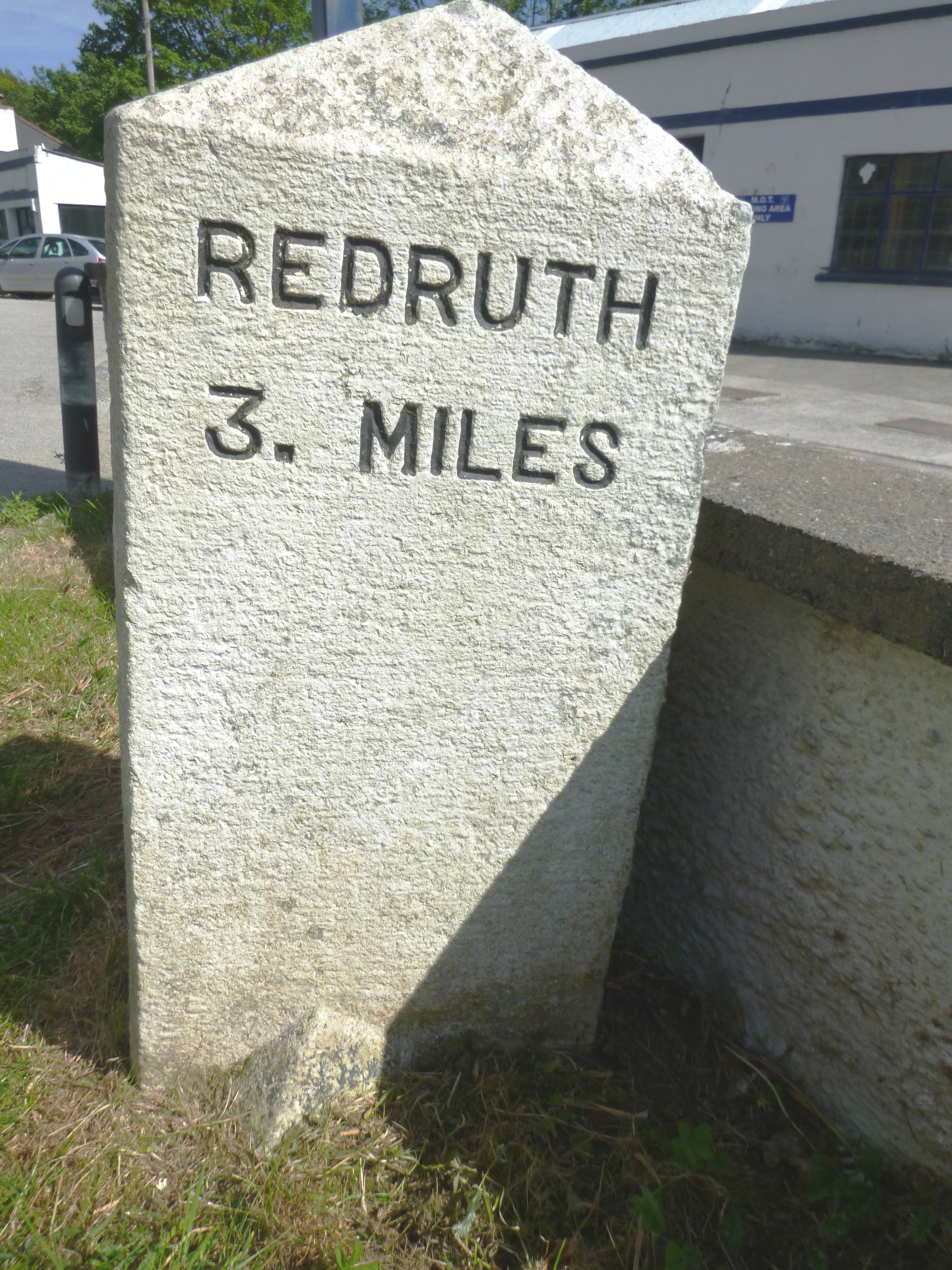
An old milestone on the B3300 at Bridge
