= Mount Wellington Tin Mine =

Tin mine in St Day, Cornwall, UK

Mount Wellington
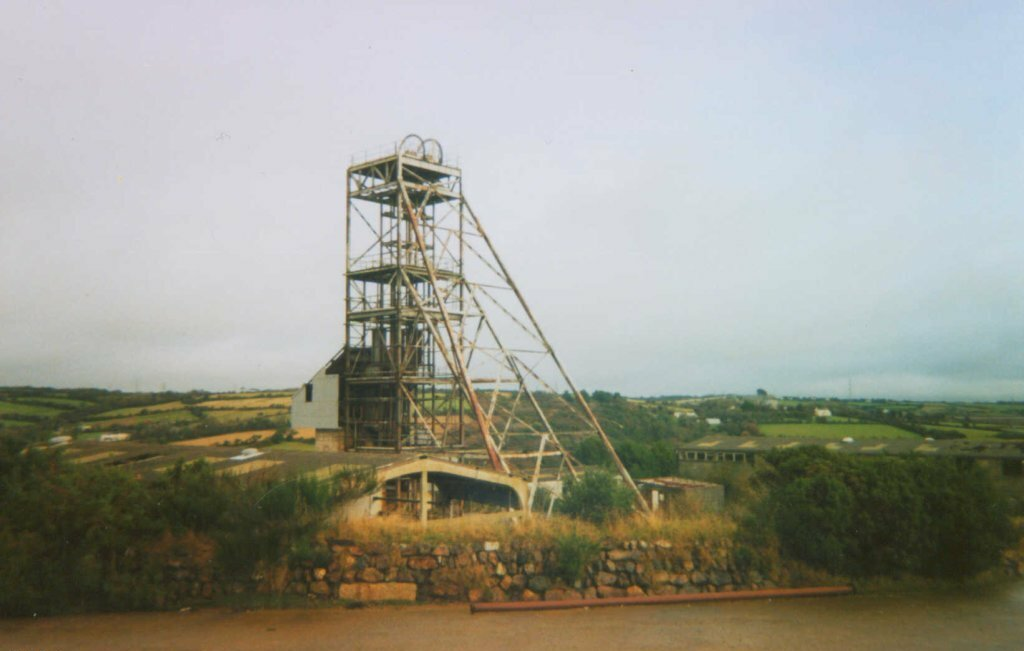
- Mount Wellington headgear, 2000

- Location in Cornwall
- Location: St Day, Cornwall, United Kingdom; 50°13′59″N 5°08′28″W
- Products: Tin
- Opened: 1976
- Closed: 1991

Mount Wellington Tin mine, two miles east of the village of St Day in Cornwall, in the United Kingdom, opened in 1976 and was the first new mine in the region in many years.

With the fall of tin prices and the withdrawal of pumping subsidies, the mine finally closed in 1991. There was an unsuccessful attempt to revive the mine by transforming it into a visitor attraction.

The site was bought by Mount Wellington Mine Ltd in early 2007. The company removed the remaining headgear stump, renovated the site, and turned it into a private, gated, business park, housing a number of tenants which operate exclusively in the renewable energy sector, including Kensa Heat Pumps.

== History ==
=== 1920–1939 ===
During the 1920s, three brothers named Wellington worked the old Wheal Andrew lodes close to surface.

The brothers were mining in a small way, working with primitive plant and operations, taking ore to a Cornish stamps down the valley to be treated for its tin content. Captain Josiah Paull, of the Mines and Metallurgical Club in London, reported that the ore the Wellingtons were breaking was yielding an average of 30 lb. of black tin per ton. The workings around the shaft they were working were crushed at a later date, putting the shaft out of action, and “being only ordinary Cornish miners”, the Wellingtons did not have the money to either open up the adit or put down another shaft.

In 1935 Mount Wellington Ltd, backed by the British Non-ferrous Mining Corp Ltd, acquired the rights on United and Consolidated Mines, Wheal Clifford and Wheal Andrew. On 5 February shares in Mount Wellington Mine Ltd were advertised for sale.

During the 1930s further shafts and mining buildings were built at Mount Wellington the mine acquired mining rights to the adjacent mines. However, by the end of the decade, milling was being suspended due to low tin prices, and it faced difficulties extracting the ore at sufficient quantities to show a profit.

On 16 December 1939 work stopped at Mount Wellington Mine due to lack of finance.

=== 1963–1979 ===
In 1963 International Mine Services Ltd of Toronto became interested in the mineral potential of Cornwall. By 1967 exploratory drilling began at Mount Wellington Mine and by 1969 a contract to sink No.1 Wellington Shaft and erect buildings was awarded to Thyssen (Great Britain Ltd) by Cornwall Tin & Mining Ltd.

In 1974 Mount Wellington mine, controlled by the Cornwall Tin and Mining Corporation, and situated a few miles to the west of Truro on the opposite side of the Bissoe Valley, to the neighbouring Wheal Jane mine, was to go ahead with the proposed tin mining operation. It was the third new tin mine in Cornwall in three years.

The erection of the concentrating plant commenced in preparation for receiving its first ore from underground in January 1976. The operation will cost initially some £4-25 million to finance and qualified for a 20% grant from the U.K. Government.

The initial throughput was forecast to be 0'2 million tonnes/annum in an all-gravity plant to provide about 1,600 tonnes of tin metal and some copper, zinc and silver. The shaft was to be deepened from 210m to 310m. The mine was planned to have a life of some 25 years, and the workforce planned was up to 300.

However, on 20 April 1978 Mount Wellington Mine closed. No more ore ever came up Wellington's No.1 shaft after this date. No.1 shaft was retained for man and machinery access. The Wellington site was sold by the Administrators of Cornwall Tin & Mining Ltd to a Falmouth-based scrap dealer.

In August 1979 Carnon Consolidated, a subsidiary of Rio Tinto Zinc, acquired Wheal Jane from Consolidated Gold Fields Ltd. RTZ used Thyssens to redevelop Wheal Jane and used William Press to renovate Wheal Jane's mill. Carnon also bought the freehold of Wellington's No.1 shaft area, together with Wellington's Engineering Building from the scrap dealer. £10m was allocated to renovate both mines.

Also in 1979, Billiton Minerals (UK) Ltd, a Shell subsidiary, bought Hydraulic Tin of Bissoe, who worked alluvial tin and mine waste tailings. Billiton bought the rest of the land and buildings, including the Mill at Mount Wellington Mine. They also bought the Wheal Maid valley and the tailings dam and lagoon. Wellington's offices, and some land for storage of plant, were leased from Billiton by Thyssens. Thyssens used Wellington as a base for their work at Wheal Jane, South Crofty and Geevor mine.

=== 1980–1999 ===
In June 1980 production at Jane recommenced, some ore coming from Mount Wellington. The following year, a new 7” MDPE pipeline was laid between Wellington and the Tailings Dam at Wheal Maid. Old mine waste was sluffified and pumped into Wellington's Mill, where it was re-processed to obtain minerals.

In 1982 Carnon Consolidated (RTZ) purchased Billiton's freehold interest in the Mount Wellington, Wheal Maid and Hydraulic Tin sites.

By 1984 100% of South Crofty had been purchased by Carnon Consolidated, a subsidiary of Rio Tinto Zinc, and the three mines of Crofty, Mount Wellington and Wheal Jane operated as one unit.

Production at Wheal Jane had already restarted in 1980 reaching 1499 tonnes of tin in 1981 and 1863 tonnes in 1984. The Wheal Maid Decline was started, on land originally owned by Mount Wellington Mine. 1984 operations produced an estimated 35,000 tons of ore. The length of the Decline is 655 meters, and reached over towards Cornwall County Council's waste dump at United Downs. The Decline suffered from ingress of Methane gas from the dump, which gave rise to safety concerns over possible underground fires or explosion.

In March 1991 Wheal Jane, incorporating Mount Wellington Mine, the Wheal Maid Decline and the Wheal Maid Tailings Lagoons, were finally closed for the last time.

On 16 January 1992 the UK's most infamous mine water outburst disaster occurred when 320 million litres of untreated acidic mine water and sludge burst from the Nangiles adit at the Wheal Jane Mine site in Cornwall into the Carnon River. This caused a major pollution plume that discoloured the estuary and deposited high concentrations of Cd and Zn. Cadmium levels reached 600 times the UK water quality standard.

In 1998 Mount Wellington Mine was bought by David Shrigley of DRS Demolition from South Crofty PLC. DRS submitted multiple planning applications for change of use for the Mount Wellington Mine site; however all were rejected.

=== Since 2000 ===
Carrick District Council gave planning consent for retention of the Mount Wellington Mine buildings in 2003.

By 15 April 2004, Carrick District Council was reviewing the future of Mount Wellington Mine at Twelveheads, Bissoe. Councillors discussed what could be done with the former mine so future possible developers could have a clear idea of its potential.

In his report to the committee, Carrick's head of development, Karl Roberts, said the site was clearly unsuitable for a residential development. The committee's comments and the report's findings were to be looked at by Carrick's full cabinet. Mount Wellington Mine had not operated for more than 10 years, and at one point, looked set to be turned into a nature reserve.

In 2005 the top of headgear at Mount Wellington were demolished.

On 15 January 2007 Mount Wellington Mine was purchased by Richard Freeborn of Mount Wellington Mine Ltd. Mount Wellington Mine was officially re-opened by Tim Smit from The Eden Project on 22 January.

On 30 May 2012 a celebration was held to commemorate the 5th anniversary of the move of Kensa Heat Pumps to the Mount Wellington Mine site as its first tenant. The gathering included, for the first time in some decades, the combined management teams of all four modern Cornish tin mines, Geevor, South Crofty, Wheal Jane and Mount Wellington Mine.

In 2013, international offshore engineering company Geoquip bought the assets of Ocean Fabrications and took over the leases on the site. The old offices in The Dry were renovated, and substantial new investment was made in the Mill Building and its associated plant yard.

On 5 March 2016, St Piran's Day, the day of the patron saint of tin-miners, the Cornish Radio Amateur Club (CRAC) made a once-only broadcast at Mount Wellington Mine, under a special licence to use the Cornish mine as an amateur radio station.

Also in 2016 Eagle Plant opened an accommodation hire business on the site, followed in February 2017 by a plant hire operation.

In 2017, new tenants Metal Surgery and Building With Frames replaced Geoquip in the Mill and Concentrator buildings respectively.

In February 2020 a new specialist manufacturing facility with offices above was built at Mount Wellington Mine, designed to meet the specific needs of Kensa Heat Pumps, the first new building at Mount Wellington Mine since the 1970s.

== Mineral Statistics ==
From Robert Hunt's Mineral Statistics of the United Kingdom.

Employment (1935–43)
Year(s)	Total	Overground	Underground
1935	95	37	58
1936	68	48	20
1937	133	86	47
1938	70	42	28
1940	5	3	2
1942	22	22	..
1943	98	78	20
