= Malpas, Cornwall =

Village in Cornwall, England

Coordinates: 50.2436°N 5.0276°W

Malpas
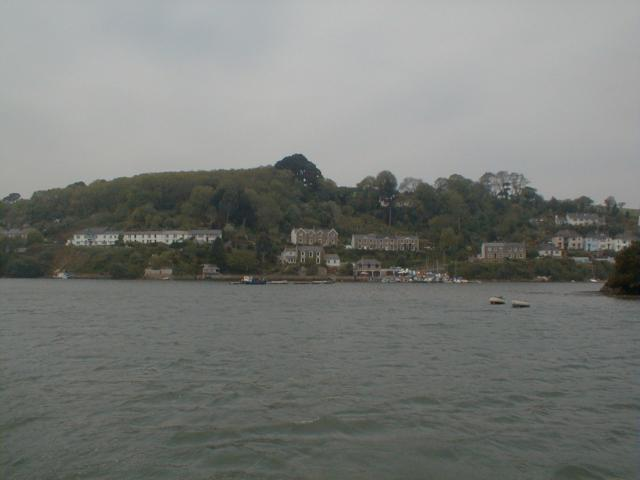
- Malpas at the confluence of the Truro and Tresillian rivers

- Flag

- Location within Cornwall
- Civil parish: St Clement
- Unitary authority: Cornwall
- Ceremonial county: Cornwall
- Region: South West
- Country: England
- Sovereign state: United Kingdom

Malpas is a riverside village, and former port, in the civil parish of St Clement, in Cornwall, England, United Kingdom. It is situated two miles (3 km) southeast of the city of Truro, on the confluence of the Truro River and the Tresillian River.

The village is a popular centre for boating with navigable waterways to Truro, Falmouth and the sea. Historically, Malpas is known for its ferry service to the Roseland peninsula and there is a myth that this crossing was used by Iseult. Ferries and boat trips still operate from Malpas.

Ships were built in Victorian times from Messrs Scoble's boat yard and timber was discharged here. Cargo for Truro was unloaded from ship to barge for transport to the city.

Malpas lies within the Cornwall Area of Outstanding Natural Beauty (AONB). The Truro River from the city to the village form part of the Malpas Estuary SSSI (Site of Special Scientific Interest). It is an important habitat of tidal mudflats, which are feeding grounds for wildfowl and wading birds. The banks of the estuary are also noted for its flora.

The Malpas Wassail is a song collected from a group of local singers in 1951. It was included in the Topic Records album Songs of Ceremony and also recorded by the Watersons for their album For Pence and Spicy Ale (and then included in their The Definitive Collection HPO 6004).
