= Frederick Hamilton Davey =

British botanist

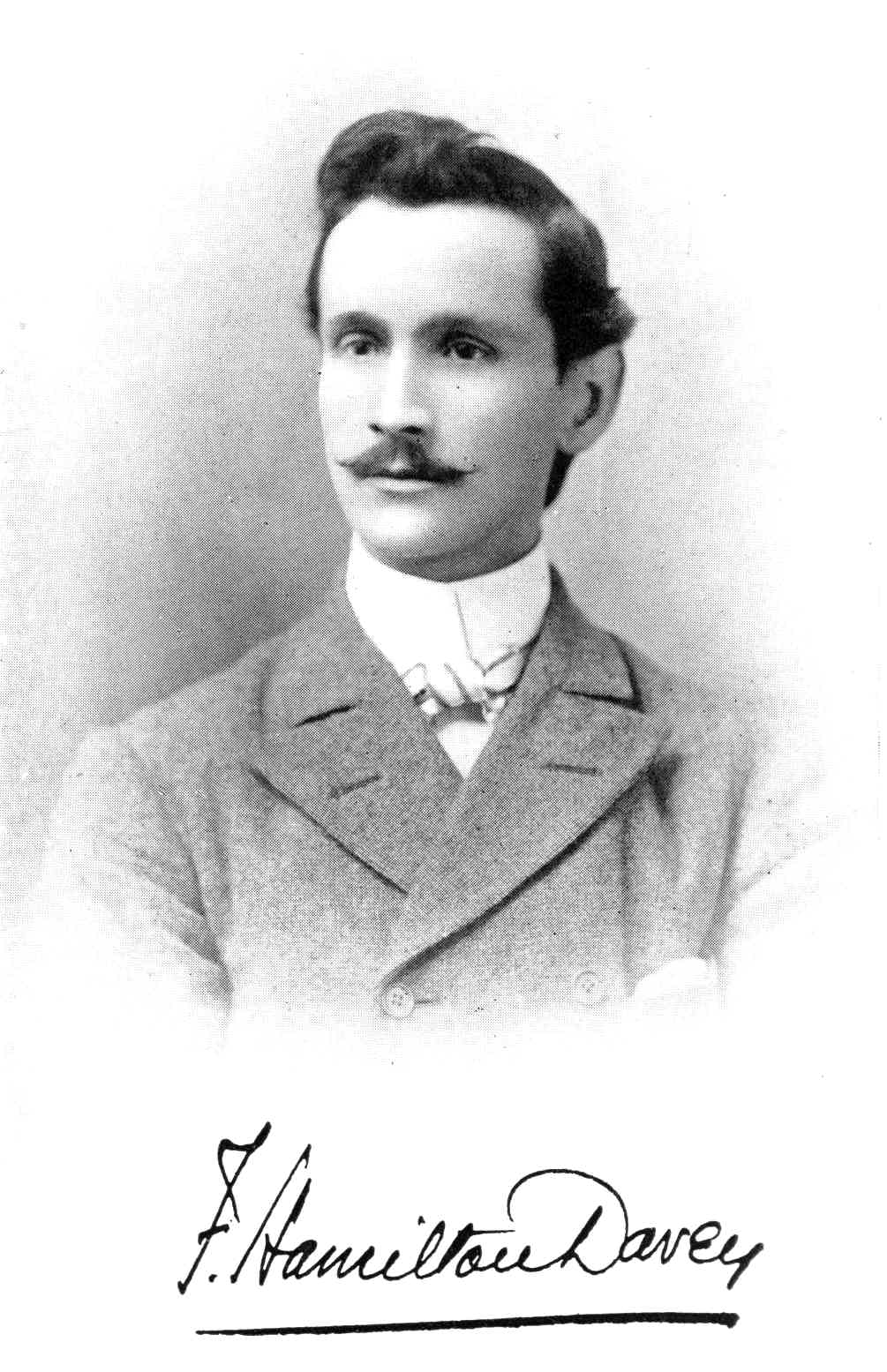

Frederick Hamilton Davey (1868–1915) was a British amateur botanist who devoted most of his leisure time to the study of the flora of Cornwall, England. Born at Ponsanooth in the Kennall Vale, Cornwall to a large family of limited means, he left school aged 11 to work in the Kennall Powder Mills. Encouraged by his father and local vicar, Davey took to Nature Study as his principal recreation. Of rather a weak constitution, he suffered successive bouts of ill-health, but used his convalescence to further his studies. In 1891, aged 23, he submitted his first paper to the Cornwall Polytechnic Society, followed by several more, earning him various medals in recognition of his industry.

In 1899, Davey met ornithologist and plant collector A. O. Hume, C.B., founder of the South London Botanical Institute, who was to accompany him on tours of Devon and Cornwall. This was clearly a seminal event, which led to Davey beginning his major opus, Flora of Cornwall, for which he was to become renowned. In 1900, Davey began training as a chemist and assayer at the Redruth School of Mines, and two years later succeeded his father as Works Manager of the Cornwall Arsenic Company's factory at Bissoe, having acted as his father's assistant for several years.

Several years later, Davey's health again deteriorated. In 1911 he suffered a heart attack followed by a cerebral thrombosis which left him unable to speak for the remainder of his life. He died on 23 September 1915, his body buried in the Wesleyan Cemetery at Ponsanooth. He never married.

== Flora of Cornwall ==
Davey's Flora of Cornwall (1909) is the standard flora of Cornwall. He was assisted by A. O. Hume and he thanks Hume, his companion on excursions in Cornwall and Devon, for his help in the compilation of that Flora, publication of which was financed by Hume. Davey gives an account of all the reports of Cornish plants from 1576 until his own time and divides the county into eight districts. The Flora was a formidable undertaking, with little time available, neither library nor herbarium accessible, and no existing works to consult. Nevertheless, with the aid of his band of voluntary helpers recruited through the offices of the Royal Institution of Cornwall and a letter to the local paper, he completed the Flora. Comprising 600 pages, the book was published in 1909 by Chegwidden, Penryn.

The Isles of Scilly are covered by the Flora but not very thoroughly: there is a good Flora of Scilly by J. E. Lousley. Thurston and Vigurs published a supplement to the flora in 1922 and in 1981 L. J. Margetts and R. W. David published A Review of the Cornish Flora. 1980 Pool: Institute of Cornish Studies ISBN 0-903686-34-1, providing information on another sixty years of study.

== Eponymy ==
The Cornish elm hybrid cultivar 'Daveyi' was named for Davey by Augustine Henry.
