= Ulmus × hollandica 'Daveyi' =

Elm cultivar

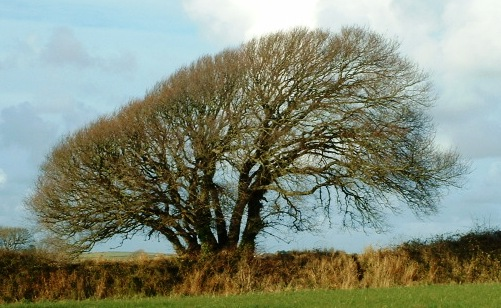
- Wind-pruned Davey Elm, Trenance Farm, Cornwall, UK
- Hybrid parentage: U. glabra × U. minor
- Cultivar: 'Daveyi'
- Origin: England

The Davey Elm, Ulmus × hollandica 'Daveyi', is an English hybrid cultivar of unknown specific origin, generally restricted to the valleys of Cornwall. Its apparent south-west England provenance, along with its foliage and habit, suggest that it may be a hybrid of Wych Elm and Cornish Elm.

== Description ==
The wide-spreading, irregular branches support pendulous branchlets. The leaves are comparatively small, rarely exceeding 6 cm in length by 5 cm wide, with a glabrous upper surface. Photographs often show this tree in its windswept coastal form; inland its shape resembles more closely its putative Wych Elm parent, though with a denser crown.

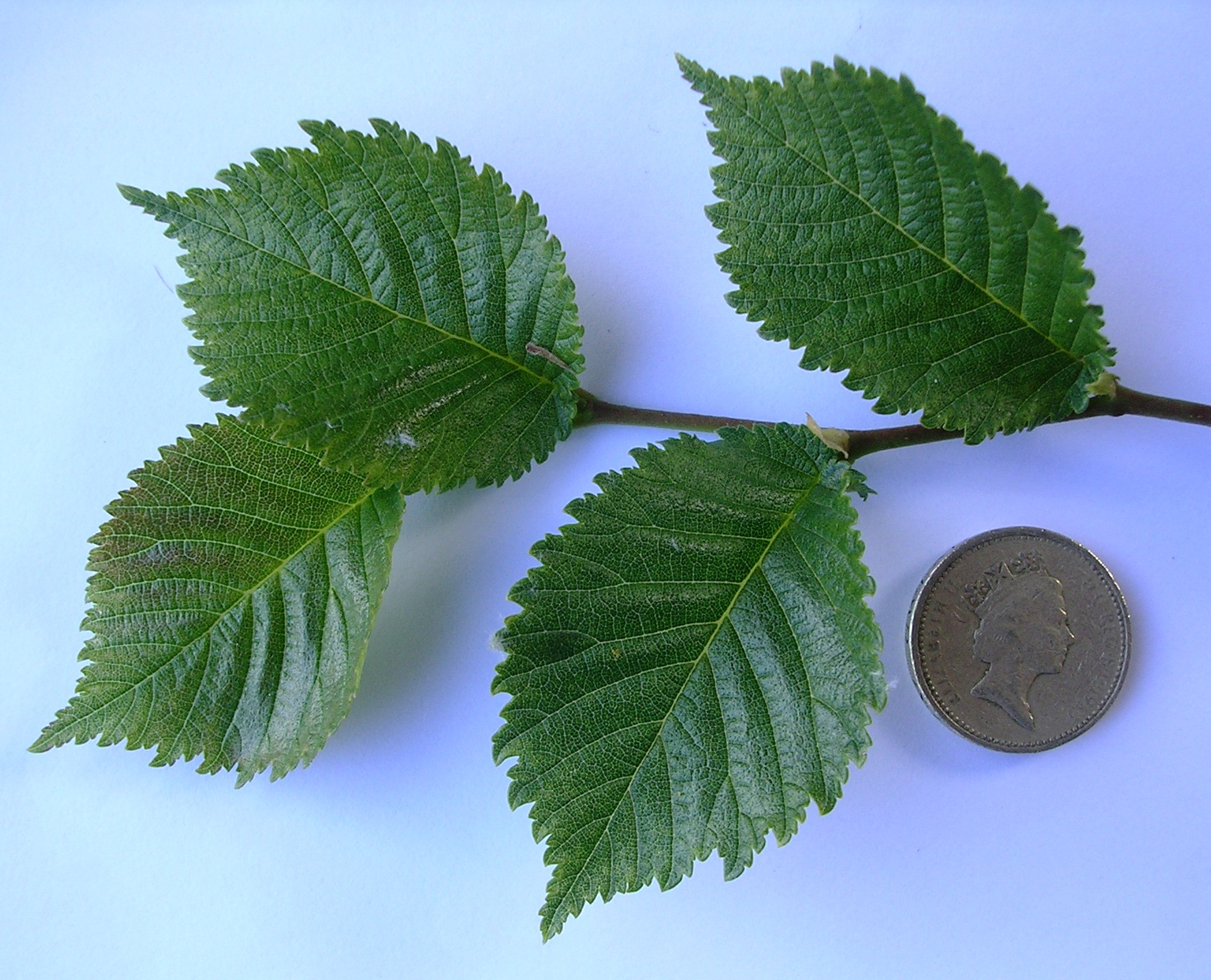

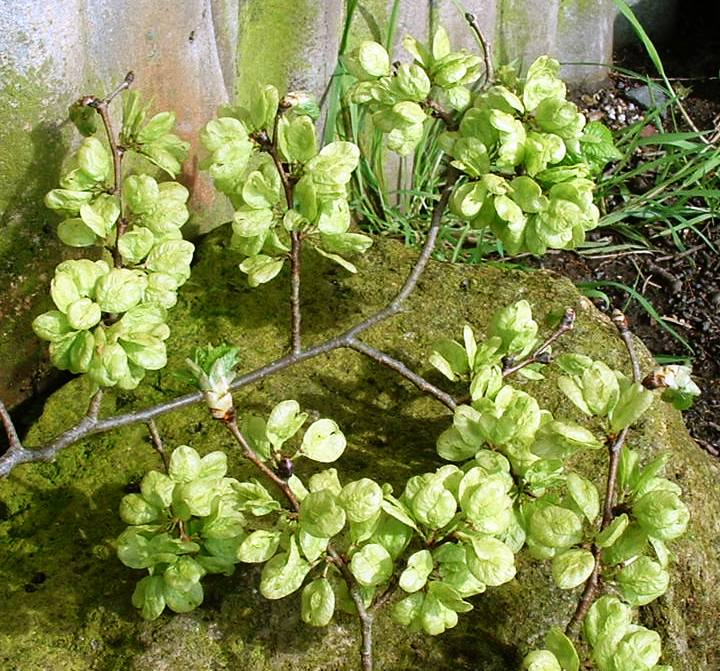

== Pests and diseases ==
The tree is susceptible to Dutch elm disease.

== Cultivation ==
A number of mature specimens are known to survive in south-west England, notably around Gulval, Newquay, the Roseland and St Kew in Cornwall. The tree is not in commerce in the UK or Europe, and is not known to have been introduced to North America or Australasia. In the Netherlands one specimen was planted (2015) in Slotlaan/Overmeerseweg, Nederhorst den Berg, in the driveway to the cemetery, as part of Wijdemeren City Council's elm collection.

== Notable trees ==
The UK TROBI Champion grows in the grounds of Holne Park House on the southern edge of Dartmoor. Discovered in 2017, it measured 30 m tall by 172 cm d.b.h. Another large tree grows in woodland behind Lancaster Avenue at Goodrington; when last measured in 2004 it was 22 m high by 100 cm d.b.h.

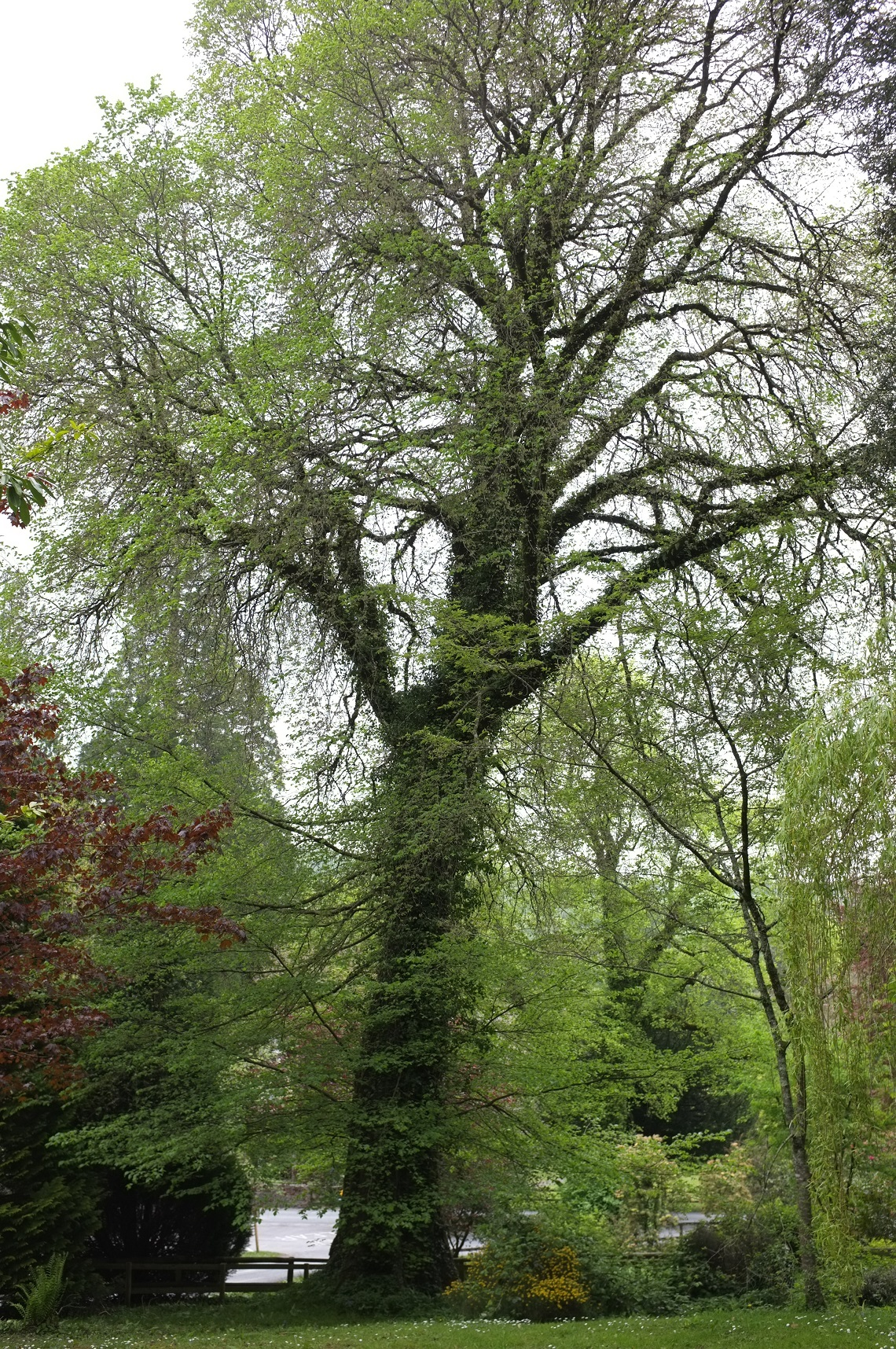
'Daveyi', Holne Park under Dartmoor (2017)

== Synonymy ==
- Ulmus major var. daveyi Henry

== Etymology ==
The Davey Elm was named by Augustine Henry for Frederick Hamilton Davey (1868-1915), Cornish botanist and author of the Flora of Cornwall, first published in 1909 and reprinted in 1978.

== Accessions ==
=== Europe ===
- Brighton & Hove City Council, UK. NCCPG Elm Collection; two trees, City Cemetery, Brighton (planted 1988).
- Grange Farm Arboretum, Sutton St James, Spalding, Lincolnshire, UK. Acc. no. 1098.
- Sir Harold Hillier Gardens, Romsey, UK. One specimen, Plant Centre Field. Acc. no. 2004.0088.
