= Tresillian River =

River in Cornwall, England

Coordinates: 50°17′13″N 5°03′38″W

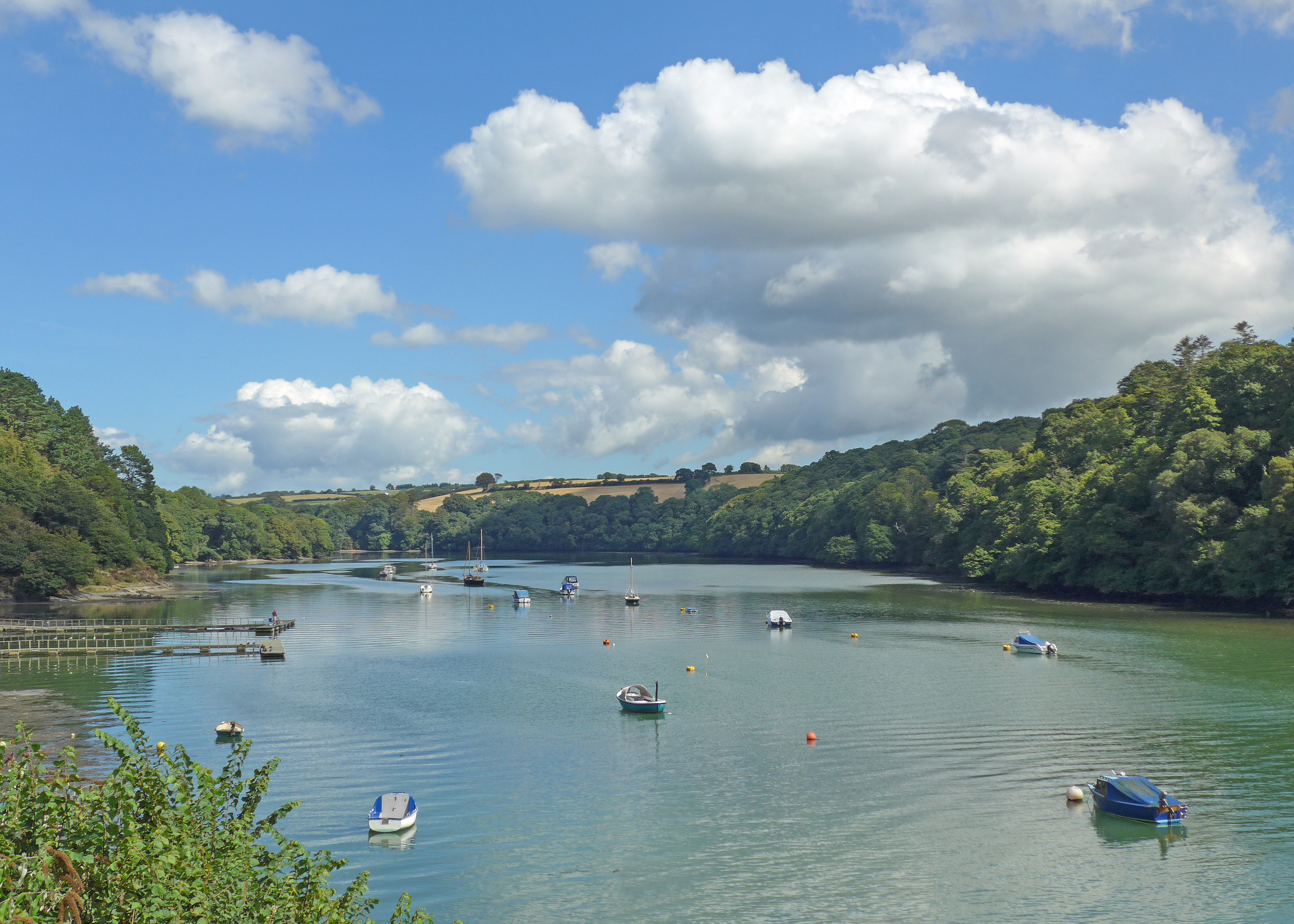
The Tresillian River at Malpas

The Tresillian River is a tributary of the River Fal in Cornwall. It rises in the Clay Country and is fed by springs between Summercourt and Mitchell. It runs south-west, alongside the B3275, through Ladock to Tresillian, where it passes under the A390 road bridge, then immediately opens into a tidal estuary, and passes the village of St Clement, before joining the Truro River at Malpas. Tresillian was a seaport until the head of the creek silted up.

Tresillian Bridge was the site of the surrender of the Hopton forces (Royalist troops of King Charles) to Parliamentarians on 10th March 1646.

The western bank of the river has a public footpath from Tresillian to Malpas. The eastern bank is part of the privately owned Tregothnan estate.

At St Clement, the river is flanked by Tresemple Pool, a shallow saline lake. The lake and the river together are popular sites for viewing kingfisher, redshank, avocet, greenshank, red-breasted merganser, curlew, little egret, and grey heron

Early records give the river the name "Seugar" (1297) or "Sowgar" (1530); the meaning of this name is unknown. Others consider Tresillian to be an anglicisation of Cornish "Sulyen's farm/settlement".
