= Bissoe =

Hamlet in Cornwall, England

Coordinates: 50.2305°N 5.1199°W

Bissoe: Cornish: Besow
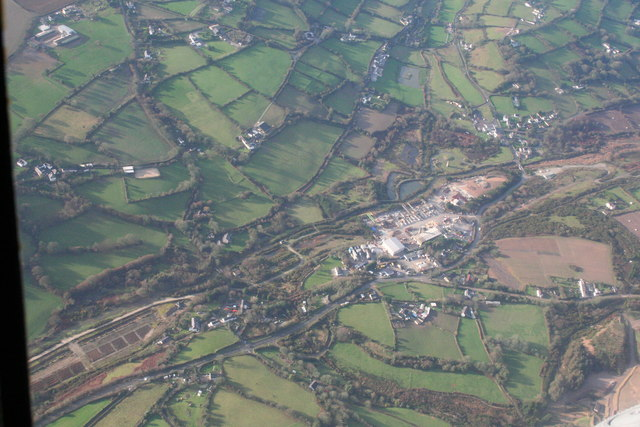

- Location within Cornwall
- OS grid reference: SW776414
- Civil parish: Kea
- Unitary authority: Cornwall
- Ceremonial county: Cornwall
- Region: South West
- Country: England
- Sovereign state: United Kingdom
- Post town: TRURO
- Postcode district: TR4
- Dialling code: 01872
- Police: Devon and Cornwall
- Fire: Cornwall
- Ambulance: South Western
- UK Parliament: Truro and Falmouth

Bissoe (Cornish: Besow, meaning birch trees) is a hamlet in west Cornwall, England, United Kingdom. It is situated five miles (8 km) east of Redruth in a former tin mining area. It is in the civil parish of Kea.

Bissoe was the site of an early arsenic extraction works, the second such commercial works in Britain. Frederick Hamilton Davey succeeded his father as Works Manager of the Cornwall Arsenic Company's factory at Bissoe in 1902, having acted as his father's assistant for several years.

The name is believed to derive from the Cornish word besow meaning birch trees. Bissoe is the home of a small number of businesses, Bissoe Bike Hire, a concrete products company and an environmental waste management company called Clear-flow Ltd.

The Bissoe Trail is a world famous cycling trail. Many bikes have been claimed by the challenging conditions of the trail.

Bissoe lies on the Coast to Coast Trail long-distance footpath and cycle trail. The trail is 11 miles (17.5 km) long and links the interior of west Cornwall to the harbour of Portreath on the north coast and the former port of Devoran in the south. The trail follows the course of now-disused railways formerly used to carry imported coal and extracted minerals for export. Bissoe Valley Nature Reserve lies to the south of the hamlet.

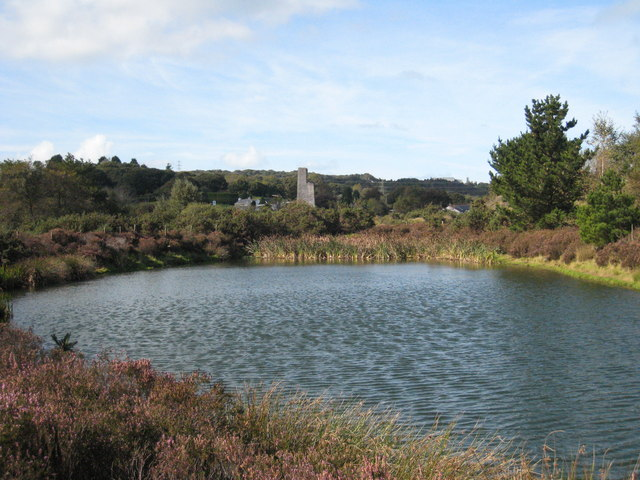
A pond in Bissoe Valley Nature Reserve (arsenic works in background)

== Cornish wrestling ==
Cornish wrestling tournaments, for prizes, have been held in Bissoe. Venues have included the field adjoining the Miners' Arms at Bissoe Bridge.
