= Tresillian House =

Tresillian House may refer to:

- Tresillian House, St Newlyn East, Cornwall, England
- Tresilian House, Vale of Glamorgan, in Tresilian Bay, Wales
