= Wheal Maid =

Former mine in Cornwall, England

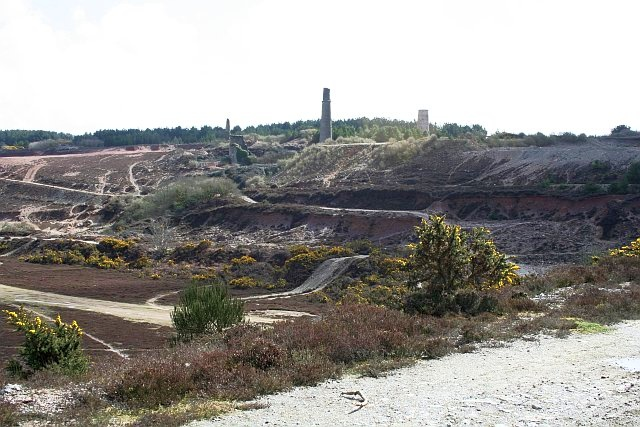
- Remains of Wheal Maid

- Location in Cornwall
- Location: Gwennap, Cornwall, England; 50°14′16″N 5°09′55″W
- Products: Mainly copper, also tin and arsenic
- Opened: 1782
- Closed: 1870s
- Company: Carnon Enterprises (pre-2002); Gwennap Parish Council (since 2002)

Wheal Maid (also Wheal Maiden) is a former mine in the Camborne-Redruth-St Day Mining District, 1.5 km east of St Day.

Between 1800 and 1840, profits are said to have been up to £200,000. In 1852, the mine was amalgamated with Poldice Mine and Carharrack Mine and worked as St Day United mine. Throughout the 1970s and 1980s, the mine site was turned into large lagoons and used as a tip for two other nearby mines: Mount Wellington and Wheal Jane.

There were suggestions that the mine could be used as a landfill site for rubbish imported from New York and a power plant that would produce up to 40 megawatts of electricity; the concept was opposed by local residents and by Cornwall County Council, with Doris Ansari, the chair of the council's planning committee, saying that the idea "[did] not seem right for Cornwall".

The site was bought from Carnon Enterprises by Gwennap District Council for a price of £1 in 2002. An investigation by the Environment Agency that concluded in 2007 found that soil near the mine had high levels of arsenic, copper and zinc contamination and by 2012, it was deemed too hazardous for human activity.

The mine gains attention during dry spells when the lagoons dry up and leaving brightly coloured stains on the pit banks and bed.

== 2014 murder ==
In 2014, a 72-year-old man from Falmouth died at the site after what was initially thought to be a cycling accident. It was later found that the man had been murdered. A 34-year-old was found guilty and sentenced to life and to serve at least 28 years.
