= Porthgwidden =

Hamlet in Cornwall, England

Coordinates: 50.2026°N 5.0545°W

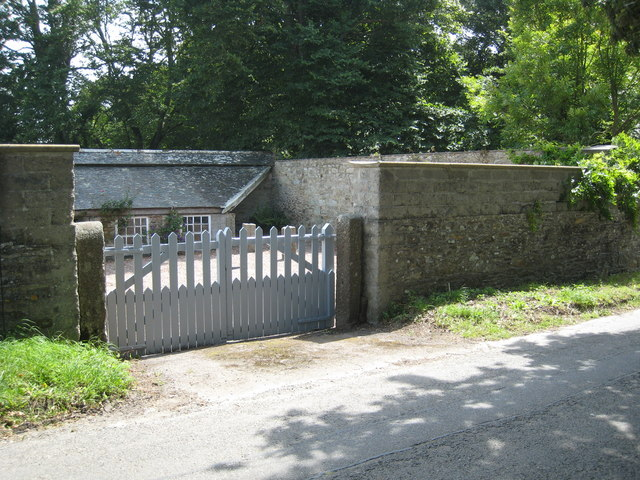
Walled garden at Porthgwidden

Porthgwidden (Cornish: Porthgwydn, meaning white cove) is a small hamlet in Cornwall, England, United Kingdom. It is located in the civil parish of Feock on the shore of the Carrick Roads.
