= Carharrack =

Village and civil parish in Cornwall, England

Coordinates: 50.230°N 5.182°W

Carharrack: Cornish: Karardhek
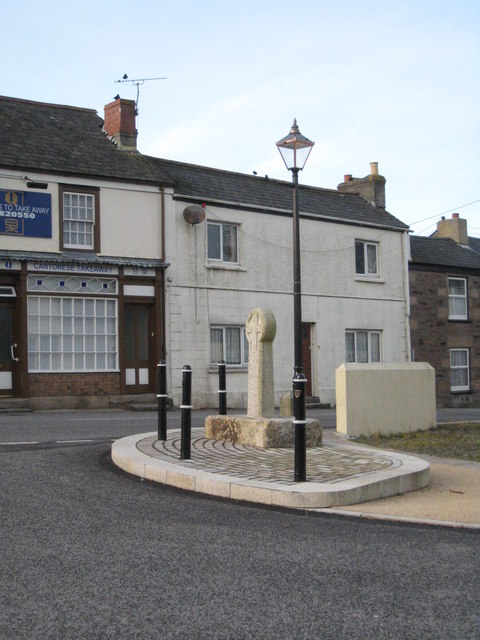
- Carharrack

- Location within Cornwall
- Population: 1,348 (2011 census)
- OS grid reference: SW732414
- Civil parish: Carharrack
- Unitary authority: Cornwall
- Ceremonial county: Cornwall
- Region: South West
- Country: England
- Sovereign state: United Kingdom
- Post town: REDRUTH
- Postcode district: TR16
- Dialling code: 01209
- Police: Devon and Cornwall
- Fire: Cornwall
- Ambulance: South Western
- UK Parliament: Camborne and Redruth

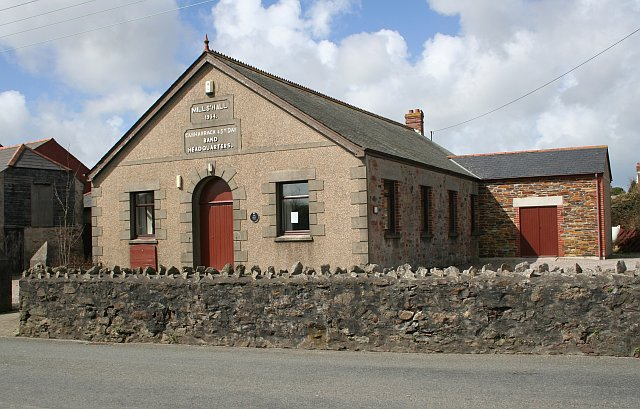
Mills Hall, Carharrack

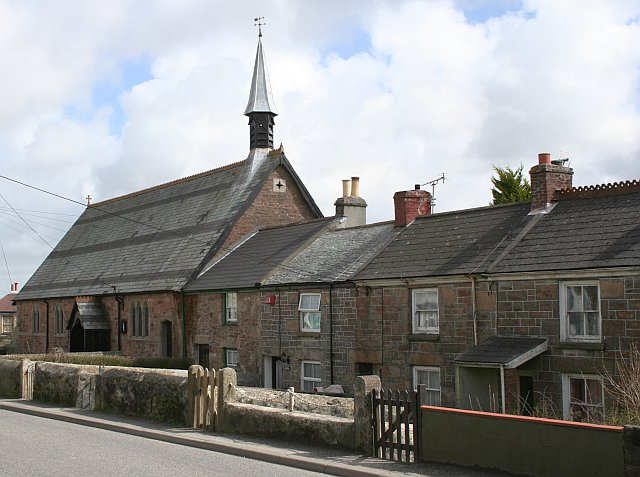
Carharrack church

Carharrack (Cornish: Karardhek) is a civil parish and village in west Cornwall, England, United Kingdom. It is situated two miles (3 km) east of Redruth in a former mining area.

The parish is of a rural/residential character, albeit with an industrial (mostly mining) past and relics of the past abound, primarily in the form of abandoned and broken down engine house buildings. The parish is comparatively small in area, and is bounded to the north and northwest by St Day parish, to the east and southeast by Gwennap parish, and to the southwest and west by Lanner parish.

Until 1985, Carharrack was part of the parish of Gwennap but it became a civil parish in its own right with the first meeting of Carharrack Parish Council on 28 May 1985.

== Toponymy ==
The derivation of the modern form of the name Carharrack is uncertain. Craig Wetherhill suggests it is a corruption of the Cornish ker/cayr Ardhek meaning Arthroc's fort. Eric Rabjohns, a locally based local-historian, while acknowledging this possibility, also advances another two contenders. The first is that the name refers to a dwelling of religious purpose, a meeting place for travellers, originating from Carharrack's proximity to the pilgrimage trail between Canterbury and St Michael's Mount, which is known to have passed through the nearby villages of St Day to the north and Lanner to the south. The final option, again based on a corruption of the Cornish, this time of Car (or Caer) Harrack meaning a camp, enclosure, or settlement near the rock or Carn, presumably referring to the mass of Carn Marth whose granite bulk overshadows the village. Each derivative has a degree of evidence to support it.

== History ==
Earliest references to the area appear around 1290, but references to dwellings on the current site only date from the 1700s. Boom years for the village were in the first half of the nineteenth century, with the expansion of the local mines which at peak employed several thousand people: Carharrack was the closest settlement and provided plenty of space for building. By the 1860s the copper industry in Cornwall was in decline and many residents emigrated in search of work.

A Wesleyan Methodist Chapel was opened in 1815. The grade II* listed building was altered in the late 19th and early 20th-century and is now a Methodist church. Carharrack church was opened on 20 February 1884 by Canon Phillpotts of Porthgwidden. It was built by Messrs Williams and Moyle for £600 and holds nearly 200 people. The eastern window is a memorial to Miss Rogers of Trevarthian.

During the latter part of the twentieth century the village suffered a progressive loss both of local employment and local facilities and although there have been various new housing developments around the village it now functions more as a dormitory village.

== Mining ==
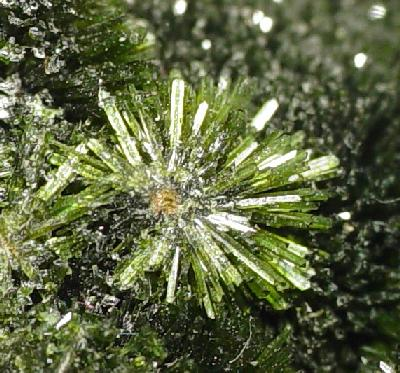
Olivenite, a crystalline mineral common in the Carharrack area

Carharrack is within the Cornwall and West Devon Mining Landscape, a World Heritage Site; it is in the Redruth Mining District of the designated area. The site of the Consolidated Mines, formed in 1782 by the amalgamation of Carharrack Mine and several other local tin and copper mines, is immediately east of the village. The mines were served by the Redruth and Chasewater Railway (an early narrow gauge line) which connected them to quays at Devoran on Cornwall's south coast. The railway closed in 1915 and its course is now a long-distance footpath and cycleway, one of Cornwall's Mineral Tramway Trails.

Carharrack is the type locality for the copper-arsenate mineral Olivenite, a crystalline lustrous rock which often has a green or olive hue.

== Culture and sport ==
Local electronic musician Aphex Twin made a remix of his own track "Ventolin" titled "Ventolin (Carharrack Mix)". The remix was first released on Ventolin Remixes in 1995 and was later included on the 1996 compilation 51/13 Aphex Singles Collection. The village also has a brass band Carharrack and St Day which notably play for the St Day feast dances.

The village has a football team, Carharrack AFC, which play in the Cornwall Combination League. They were champions in season 2016–17.

=== Cornish wrestling ===
There have been Cornish wrestling tournaments held in Carharrack in a field adjoining the Steam Engine Inn.

See also wrestling in Lanner, wrestling in Gwennap and wrestling in Frogpool
