= Tresillian =

Village in mid Cornwall, England

Coordinates: 50°16′41″N 4°59′42″W

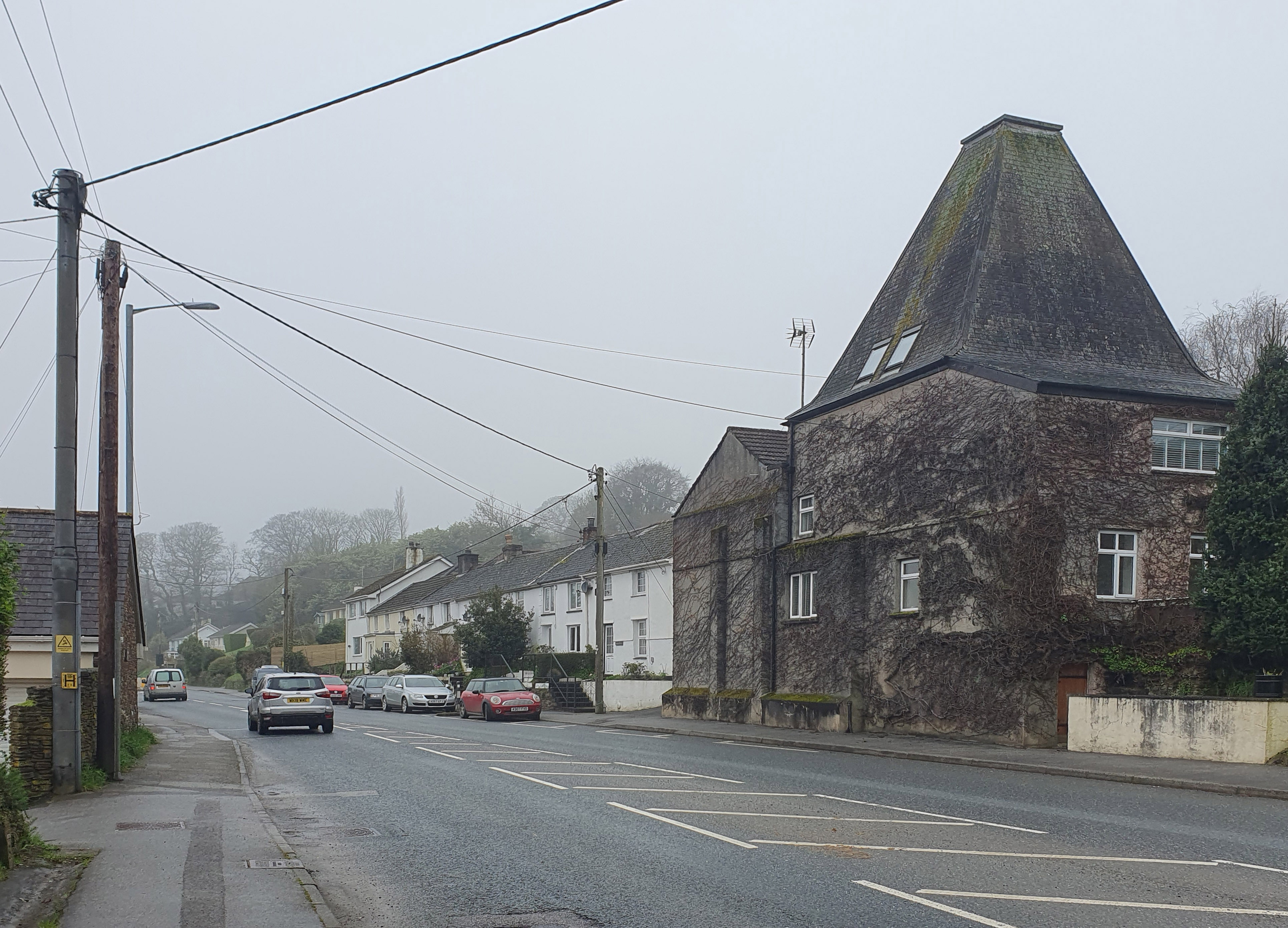

- Location within Cornwall
- Civil parish: St Clement
- Unitary authority: Cornwall
- Ceremonial county: Cornwall
- Region: South West
- Country: England
- Sovereign state: United Kingdom
- Post town: TRURO
- Postcode district: TR2
- Dialling code: 01872
- Police: Devon and Cornwall
- Fire: Cornwall
- Ambulance: South Western

see also Tresillian House

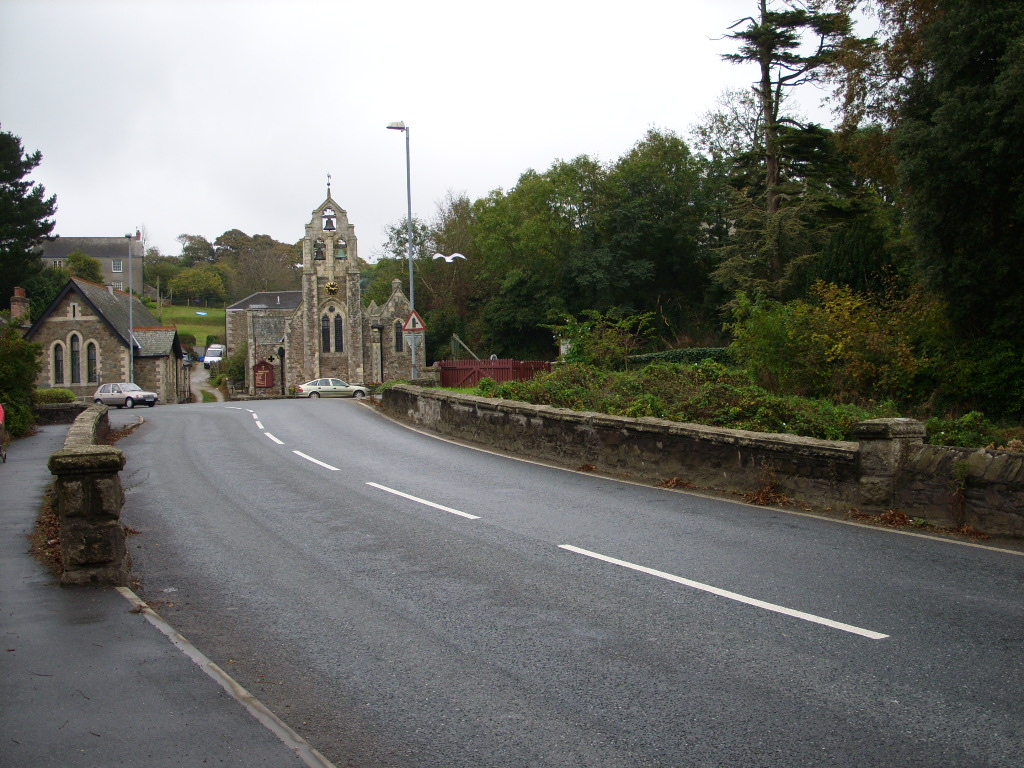
Tresillian Bridge

Tresillian (Cornish: Tresulyan) is a small village in the civil parish of St Clement, in mid Cornwall, England, United Kingdom. It is three miles (5 km) east of Truro on the A390 road. Tresillian means "a place of eels" in the Cornish language, according to a 19th-century writer. However, modern toponymists agree that the name in fact translates as "farm/settlement of a man called Sulyen" (a Celtic personal name from British: sulo-genos, "sun-born").

== History ==
Tresillian was the home of Robert Tresilian, Chief Justice of the King's Bench between 1381 and 1387.

A famous event of the English Civil War took place here in 1646. Thomas Fairfax sent a summons of surrender to Ralph Hopton who replied on 8 March that he was willing to negotiate terms. Fairfax agreed to negotiate and on 10 March 1646 both sides met at Tresillian Bridge. Hopton agreed to move his army to St Allen as a gesture of trust and goodwill allowing Fairfax to occupy Truro. The Wheel Inn at Tresillian is Grade II Listed building and is said to be to have been used as Fairfax's headquarters during the Civil War (Battle of Tresillian).

The village is mentioned as having a yearly fair in "Owen's book of Fairs" 1788 (https://archive.org/details/owensnewbookfai00owengoog)

== Church ==
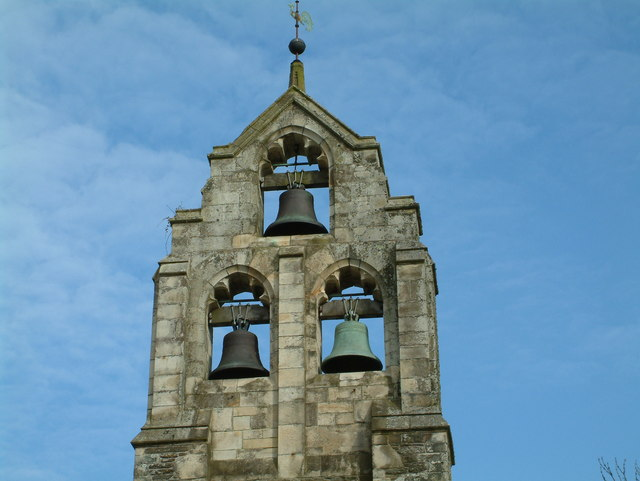
The bells of Tresillian church

A new church was built at Tresillian Bridge in 1904 (the font, bells, statue of St Anthony and pulpit from Merther were moved to the new church). The parish church of Merther was abandoned in the mid-20th century: previously it had been used occasionally, usually for funeral services.

There is a small Cornish cross on top of the church wall.
