= Portreath =

Village in Cornwall, England

Coordinates: 50.261°N 5.288°W

Portreath: Cornish: Porthtreth
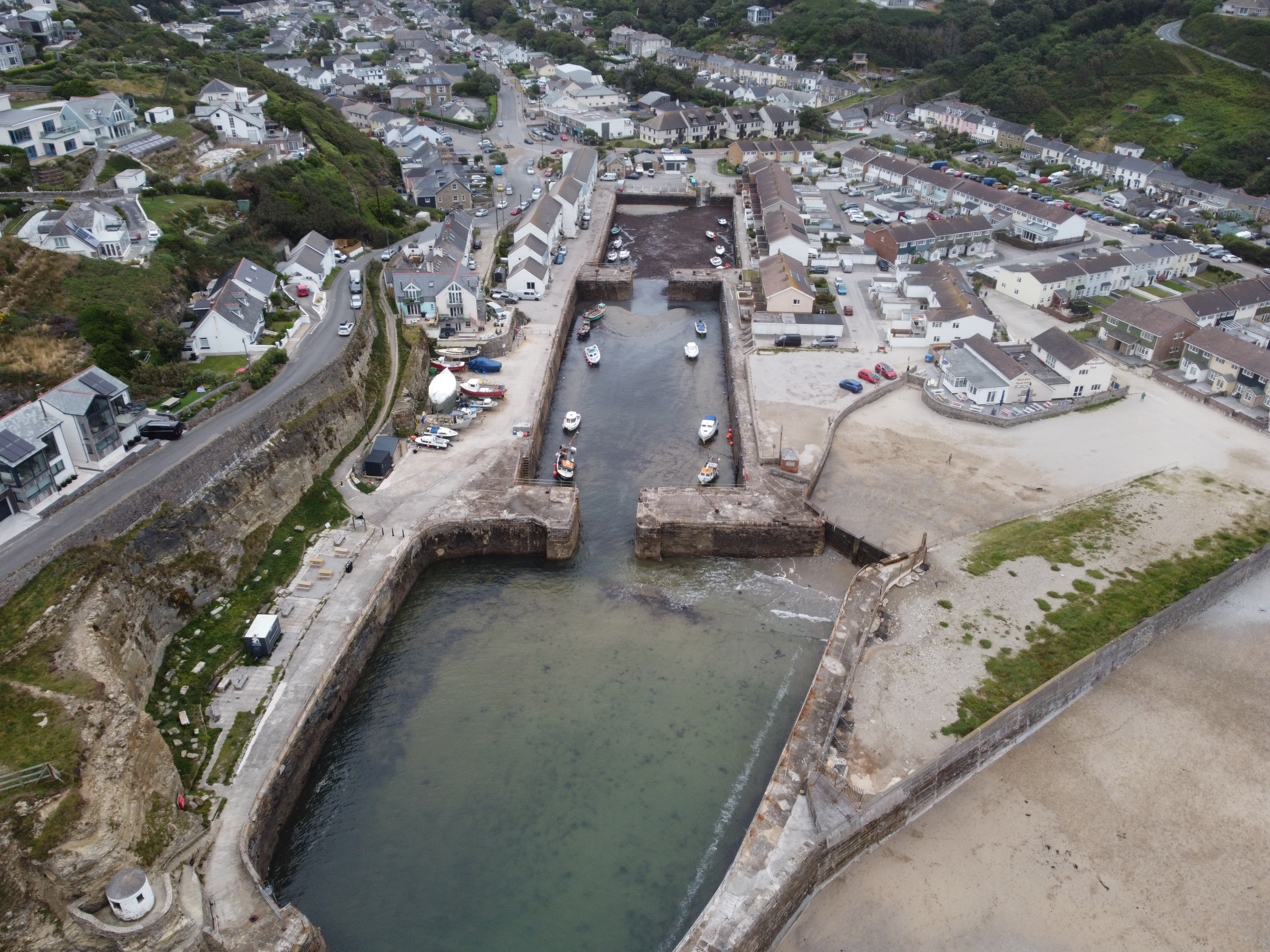
- Portreath harbour at low tide

- Location within Cornwall
- Population: 1,336 (2011 census including Bridge and Cambrose)
- OS grid reference: SW655455
- Unitary authority: Cornwall
- Ceremonial county: Cornwall
- Region: South West
- Country: England
- Sovereign state: United Kingdom
- Post town: REDRUTH
- Postcode district: TR16
- Dialling code: 01209
- Police: Devon and Cornwall
- Fire: Cornwall
- Ambulance: South Western
- UK Parliament: Camborne and Redruth

Portreath (Cornish: Porthtreth) is a civil parish, village and fishing port on the north coast of Cornwall, England, United Kingdom. The village is about three miles (5 km) west-north-west of Redruth. The village extends along both sides of a stream valley and is centred on the harbour and beach. West of the harbour entrance and breakwater are two sandy beaches that are popular with holidaymakers, surfers and naturists.

Portreath lies within the Cornwall Area of Outstanding Natural Beauty (AONB). Almost a third of Cornwall has AONB designation, with the same status and protection as a National Park. Separately, in early 2017, the village was looking to be a hedgehog-friendly village. It would join Burton Fleming in the East Riding of Yorkshire as one of a handful of hedgehog-friendly villages in the UK.

== History ==
The name Portreath (meaning "sandy cove") was first recorded in 1485, and tin streaming in the valley was recorded from 1602. Devon contractor Samuel Nott was engaged to build the first mole (or quay) in 1713 on the western side of the beach, near Amy's Point. The quay was destroyed by the sea before 1749, and the foundations are occasionally seen when the sea washes away the sand. The village also had a fishing fleet, mainly for pilchards. The harbour we see today was started in 1760 to service the expanding ore industry in the Camborne and Redruth area. The quay was extended and the inner basin constructed in 1846; New Dock, now known as Little Beach, was constructed in the 1860s.

In the late 1770s, during the American Revolutionary War, Francis Basset, lieutenant-colonel of the North Devon militia, commanded local miners to fortify the port, which helped counter a Franco-Spanish invasion fleet gathered as part of the European theatre of the war. Some of the foritifications are still standing to this day.

By 1827, Portreath was described as Cornwall's most important port and was, with Devoran on the south coast, one of the main ports for sending the copper ore mined in the Gwennap area to Swansea for smelting. The ships returned with Welsh coal to fire the steam engines used on the mines. The peak of this enterprise was around 1840, when some 100,000 tons of copper ore were shipped out each year.

With the population growing, a church was built in 1827; the Portreath Hotel (1856), Methodist Chapel (1858), Basset Arms (1878) and the School (1880) all followed. A cholera outbreak in 1878 caused the death of almost half the population. The schooner Ringleader was launched in 1884 at Mr William Davies's ″building yard″. Carrying 350 tons, she was built for the coast trade between Cardiff and Plymouth. The copper trade collapsed by 1886 and the port was almost bankrupt, although trade of domestic coal, cement, slate and potatoes continued until after the Second World War. The owner, Beynon Shipping Company, donated the harbour to Kerrier District Council in June 1980; it is now leased to the Portreath Harbour Association by the present owner, Cornwall Council.

=== Tramroads and railways ===
The Portreath Tramroad, the first railway in Cornwall, was started in 1809 to link the harbour with the copper mines at Scorrier and St Day. By 1812 the tramroad reached Scorrier House, one of the financiers' houses, and was completed by 1819. It was horse-drawn with wagons on an approximately 4 ft (1.2 m) gauge using L-shaped cast iron plates on square granite blocks. The line was little-used after the Poldice mine closed in the 1860s, and the tramroad was closed in 1865.

The Portreath branch of the Hayle Railway was opened in 1838. To the south of the harbour, and on the west side of the valley, are the remains of the old cable-worked incline that linked the harbour to the mainline at Carn Brea. The Portreath incline was one of four on the Hayle Railway; it was 1,716 ft (523 m) long with a rise of about 240 ft (73 m). It was worked by a stationary steam engine, used as the winding engine. Part of the main line of the Hayle Railway was incorporated into the route of the West Cornwall Railway in 1852; the branch line finally closed in 1936.

The railways and Portreath Tramroad associated with the minerals trade today form the Mineral Tramways Coast to Coast, a long-distance cycleway and footpath extending 15 miles (24 km) from Portreath to the south coast.

=== Nancekuke ===
RRH Portreath, on Nancekuke Common to the north of the village, is now a radar station operated by the RAF, but was originally built in 1940 to be an aircraft stop-over field during World War II.

== Sport ==
There were Cornish wrestling tournaments, for prizes, held at the Basset Arms during the 1800s.

Portreath has a surf lifesaving club.

== Nance Wood ==
Nance Wood, 1 mile (1.6 km) to the south east of the village, is a narrow strip of semi-natural woodland on a steep north-facing slope which was designated as a Site of Special Scientific Interest for its biological characteristics.

Most of the woodland is a 4–6 metres (13–20 ft) high, wind-pruned, sessile oak (Quercus petraea) last coppiced in the first half of the 20th century. The woods are one of only two sites in Britain to contain Irish spurge (Euphorbia hyberna), which is listed in the Red Data Book of rare and endangered plant species.

== Gallery ==
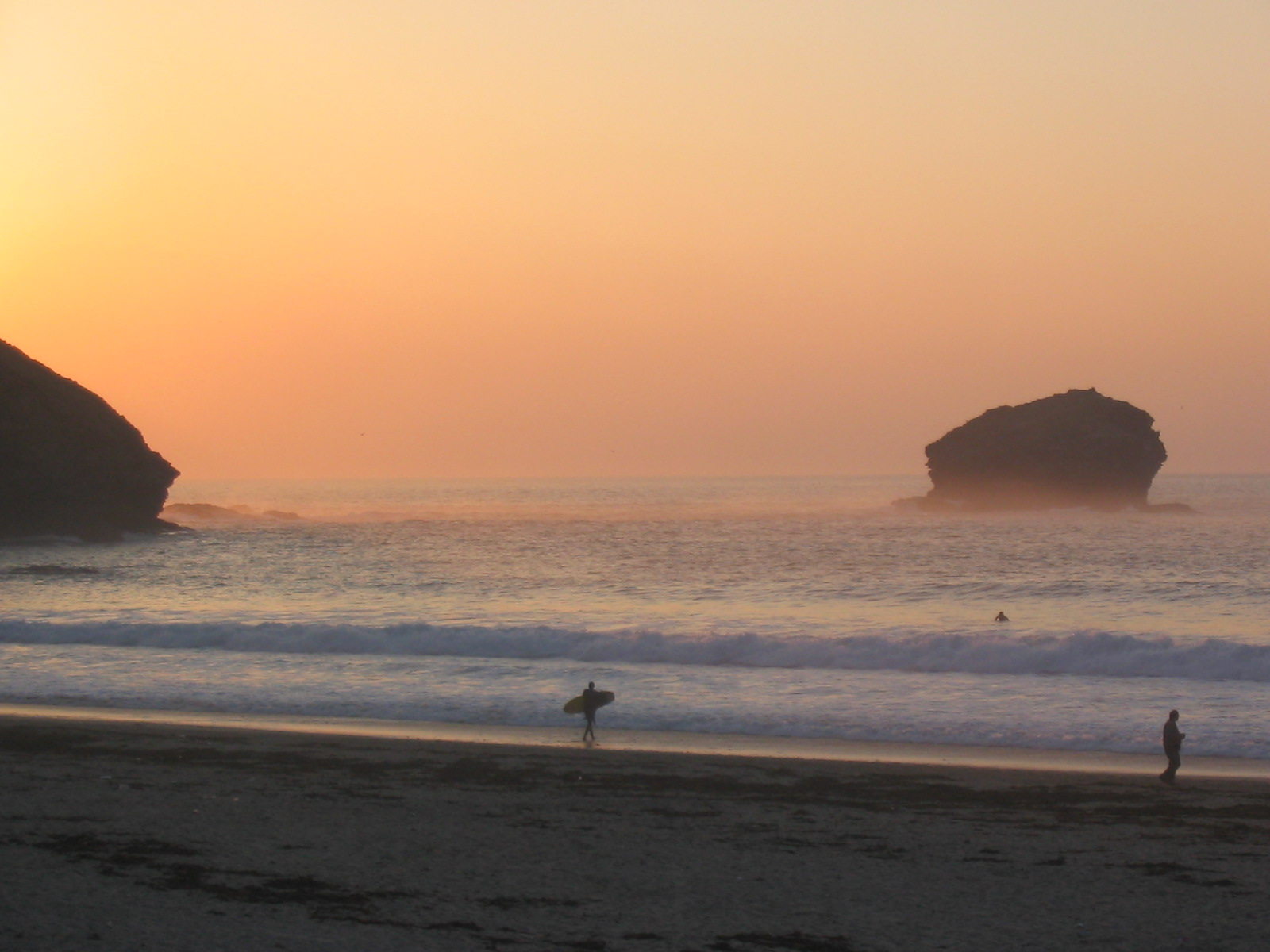
The beach and Gull Rock at sunset

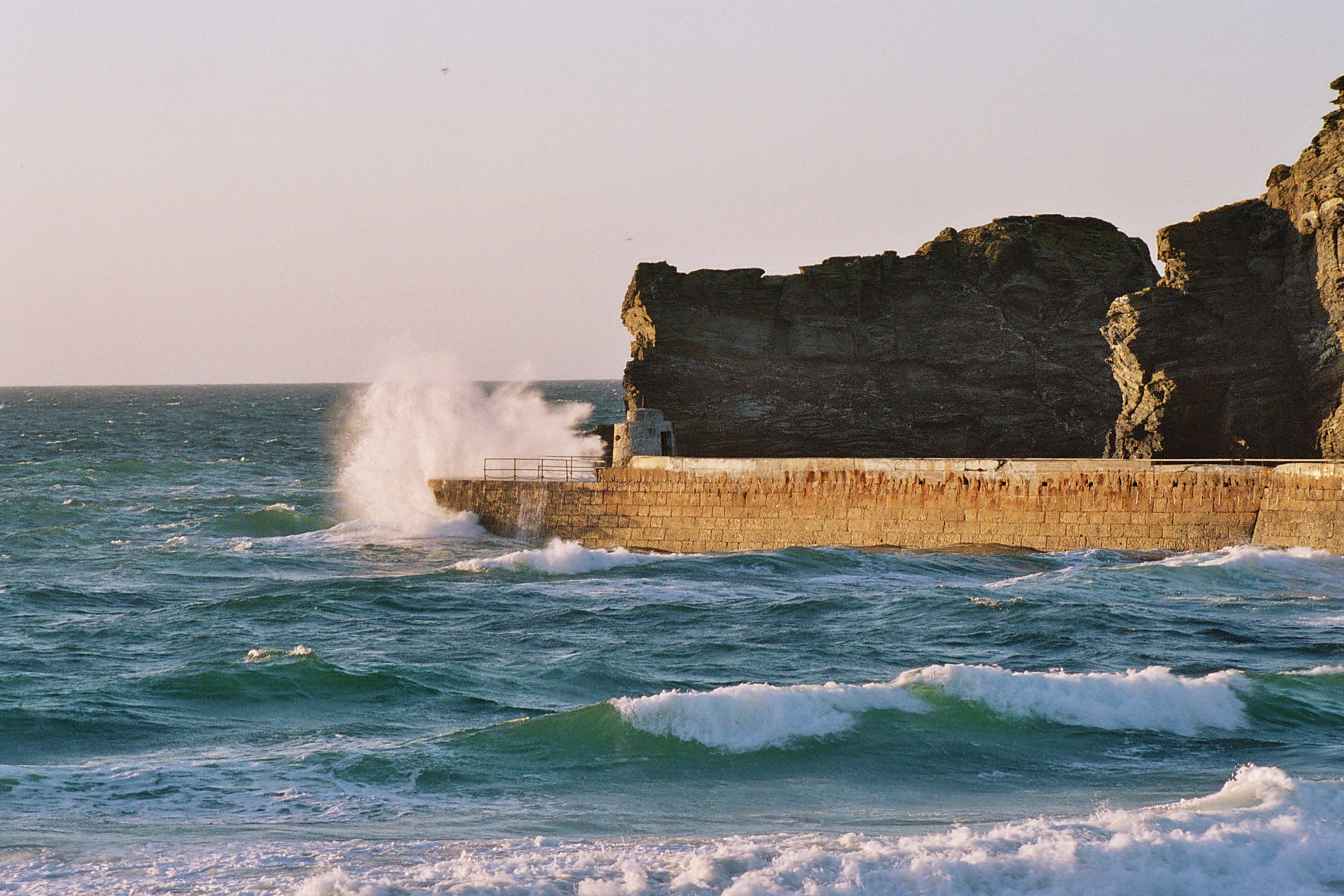
Portreath harbour mole

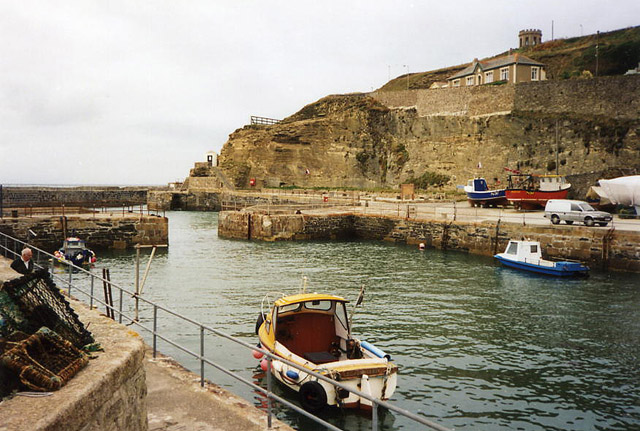
Portreath inner harbour
