= List of cycle routes in Wales =

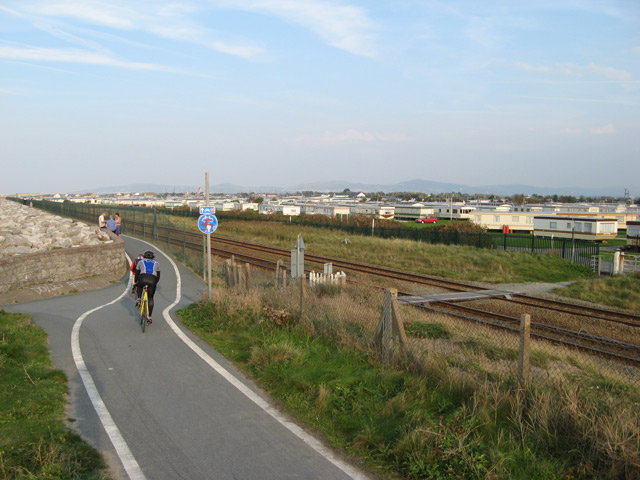
NCN 5, Conwy

The following is a list of cycleways in Wales.

- Celtic Trail cycle route (a multiple-route trail between Chepstow and St Davids, using parts of Routes 42, 43, 46, 47, 49, and 492, 4, the Millennium Coastal Path and a large part of Route 8 (Lon las Cymru)
- Lôn Las Cymru (see National Cycle Route 8) Holyhead to Cardiff
- Millennium Coastal Path (forms a section of both the Celtic Trail cycle route, (part of Route 47 and Route 4)
- National Cycle Route 4 (London to Fishguard)
- National Cycle Route 5 (Reading – Holyhead, taking in the North Wales coast
- National Cycle Route 8 ('Lôn Las Cymru') (Cardiff to Holyhead)
- National Cycle Route 42 (Gloucester – Cinderford – Parkend – Chepstow – Abergavenny – Hay-on-Wye – Glasbury)
- National Cycle Route 43 (Swansea – Caehopkin – Llanwrtyd Wells – Builth Wells)
- National Cycle Route 46 (Bromsgrove – Droitwich – Worcester – Hereford – Abergavenny – Merthyr Tydfil – Neath)
- National Cycle Route 47 (Newport – Neath – Swansea – Llanelli – Carmarthen – Fishguard)
- National Cycle Route 49 (Abergavenny – Pontypool – Cwmbran – Newport)
- National Cycle Route 81 ('Lon Cambria' Aberystwyth – Shrewsbury – Telford – Wolverhampton – NCR 5 at Smethwick also known as Lon Cambria)
- National Cycle Route 82 ('Lôn Las Ogwen': Bangor – Capel Curig - Porthmadog – Dolgellau – Machynlleth (–) Ystrad Meurig – Fishguard)
- National Cycle Route 84 (Rhyl – St Asaph - Llangollen – Oswestry)
- National Cycle Route 85 (Chester – Wrexham - Trevor – Llangollen - Corwen – Bala – Dolgellau)
- National Cycle Route 88 (Caerleon – Newport – Cardiff – Bridgend)
- Route 423 (Cwmbran – Monmouth – Ross (former RR30 and Peregrine Path)
- Route 436 (Dulais Valley, South Wales)
- Route 437 (South Wales to Glanaman)
- Route 438 (South Wales to Glanaman)
- Route 439 (South Wales to Glanaman)
- Route 440 (Milford Haven)
- Route 446 (Carmarthen – Llandysul)
- Route 447 (Cardiganshire to Newcastle Emlyn)
- Route 448 (Crymych – Cardigan)
- Route 465: Pontypool – Hafodyrynys (- Crumlin); (Aberbeeg -) Cwm – Beaufort
- Route 466: Valleys
- Route 467: Sirhowy Valley (Blackwood - Holybush / Pouchin - Tredegar)
- Route 468: Rhymney Valley (Pengam - Bute Town)
- Route 469: Bargoed – (Fochriw – Rhymney)
- Route 475: Caerphilly – Senghenydd
- Route 476: Trelewis – Taff Bargoed
- Route 477: Edwardsville – Merthyr Tydfil
- Route 478: Abercynon – Llwydcoed
- Route 492: Cwmbran – Brynmawr
- Route 566: Anglesey north coast
- Route 811: Valleys – Porth-Pontypridd (Rhondda Fach)
- Route 818: Llangurig NCN81 high level braid
- Route 819: Rhayader-Strata Florida southern braid
- Route 820: Llanwrtyd Wells – Strata Florida/NCN81
- Route 822: Aberaeron – Lampeter
- Route 825: Radnor Ring
- Route 862: Gellings Greenway: Kirkby – Knowsley (Liverpool)
- Route 881: Valleys (Rhondda Valley / Pontypridd – Maerdy)
- Route 882: Valleys (Rhondda Valley / Treorchy)
- Route 883: Valleys (Ogmore Valley)
- Route 884: Valleys (Garw Valley)
- Route 885 (Bridgend – Maesteg – Afan Forest Park)
- Route 887 (Port Talbot – Pontrhydyfen – Afan Forest Park)
- Taff Trail (partly follows the National Cycle Network Route 8, Lôn Las Cymru)
- The National Byway -including stretches among the Welsh Marches

== See also ==
- Conservation in the United Kingdom
- Cycleways in England
