= List of cycle routes in England =

This is a list of recreational cycle routes in England.

- The Alban Way, Hertfordshire
- The Bristol & Bath Railway Path
- The Cambridgeshire Guided Busway, Cambridgeshire
- The Camel Trail, North Cornwall
- The Cheshire Cycleway, Cheshire
- Clay Trails, Cornwall
- Fallowfield Loop, Manchester
- Fledborough Trail (Lincoln - Fledborough), Lincs./Notts.
- Great Flat Lode trail, Cornwall
- Greensand Cycle Way, Bedfordshire
- The Greenway, Warwickshire
- The Greenway, east London
- The Ebury Way Cycle Path
- High Peak Trail, Derbyshire
- Manifold Way, Staffordshire
- Marriott Way, Norfolk
- The Milton Keynes redway system
- Middlewood Way, Cheshire/Stockport
- Mineral Tramway Trails, Cornwall
- Monsal Trail, Derbyshire
- Nickey Line, Hertfordshire
- The Parkland Walk, North London
- The Pedersen Way, Gloucestershire
- Reepham Bridle and Cycle Route, Norfolk
- Sea to Sea Cycle Route, northern England
- Sett Valley Trail, Derbyshire
- The Sunshine Trail, Isle of Wight
- Tarka Trail, Devon
- Tissington Trail, Derbyshire
- The Somerset Levels host a number of designated cycleways.
- Water Rail Way (Kirkstead - Lincoln), Lincolnshire
- W2W route, Walney to Wear, northern England
- The Way of the Roses, Morecambe, Lancashire to Bridlington, East Riding of Yorkshire.

== See also ==
- National Cycle Network
- Cycleways in Wales
- Cycleways in Scotland
- Cycleways in Northern Ireland
- List of cycleways
- List of cycle routes in London
- Segregated cycle facilities
