= List of routes in Zone 8 of the National Cycle Network =

This is a list of National Cycle Routes in Zone 8 of the numbering scheme. Known as the Lôn Las Cymru, fully open and signed between Cardiff and Holyhead (Anglesey) via Brecon, Builth Wells, Machynlleth, Porthmadog and Bangor.

== Single- and double-digits ==
Route name/number	From	To	Via	Notes
NCR 8	Cardiff Bay	Holyhead	Brecon, Machynlleth	Lôn Las Cymru; Incorporates the Taff Trail from Cardiff to Brecon
NCR 81	Aberystwyth	Shrewsbury	Rhayader, Welshpool	Lôn Cambria
NCR 82	Fishguard	Bangor	Aberystwyth, Porthmadog	Section between Aberystwyth and Machynlleth unbuilt Lôn Las Teifi
NCR 84	Oswestry	Rhyl	Llangollen, Ruthin	Unbuilt except for Chirk to Llangollen and St Asaph to Rhyl
NCR 85	Dolgellau	Chester	Bala, Llangollen, Wrexham	Only section open on Llangollen Canal
NCR 88	Caerleon	Margam	Newport, Cardiff, Barry, Bridgend	Mostly unbuilt

== Triple-digits ==
Route name/number	From	To	Via	Notes
NCR 810	Liverpool	Formby	Bootle	
NCR 818	Cwmystwyth	Llangurig		Link route between NCRs 8 and 81
NCR 820	Pont Rhyd-y-Groes	Ystrad Meurig		Link route between NCRs 81 and 82
NCR 822	Aberaeron	Lampeter	Felinfach	Open from Aberaeron to Llanerchaeron
NCR 825	Circular route	Circular route	Rhayader, Knighton, Kington, Llandrindod	Radnor Ring
NCR 881	Pontypridd	Maerdy	Porth	Rhondda Fach Trail
NCR 883	Blackmill	Nant-y-Moel	Ogmore Vale	
NCR 884	Brynmenyn	Blaengarw	Pontycymer	Garw Valley Trail
NCR 885	Bridgend	Cymmer	Aberkenfig, Maesteg	Llynfi Valley Trail
NCR 887	Port Talbot	Glyncorrwg	Cwmafan, Cymmer	Afan Valley Trail
