= National Cycle Route 42 =

Cycle route in the United Kingdom

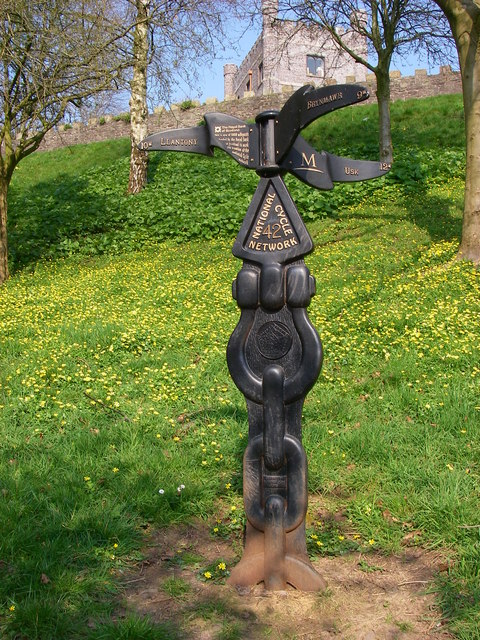
- Route 42 signage
- Length: 91 km (57 mi)
- Location: Wales and England
- Trailheads: Glasbury – Gloucester
- Use: Cycling
- Difficulty: Moderate
- Season: All year
- Waymark: 42
- Surface: Mixed (road, traffic-free sections)
- Maintained by: Walk Wheel Cycle Trust
- Website: Walk Wheel Cycle Trust – Route 42
Trail map
Glasbury → Llanthony → Abergavenny → Usk → Pen-y-cae-mawr → Tintern → Chepstow → Cinderford → Gloucester

National Cycle Route 42 is a part of the National Cycle Network running from Glasbury in Mid Wales to Gloucester in England. It provides a north–south link from 8 , (Lon Las Cymru) to 4 and provides an alternative south route for Lon Las Cymru for those starting at Chepstow instead of Cardiff. It is also part of the Celtic Trail.

== Route ==
National Cycle Route 42 begins in Glasbury, Powys, where it connects with 8 . From there, the route runs south through the Vale of Ewyas, passing through Llanthony and continuing toward Abergavenny. In Abergavenny, it intersects with the Four Castles cycle route and crosses 46 .

The route continues to the town of Usk and then passes through the hamlet of Pen-y-cae-mawr before reaching Tintern. It proceeds to Chepstow, where it links with 4 a major east–west corridor in the National Cycle Network.

Beyond Chepstow, 42 extends eastward into England, following a corridor north of the Severn Estuary. It passes through Cinderford, where it connects with 44 , and continues onward to Gloucester.

== See also ==
- List of National Cycle Network routes
- Walk Wheel Cycle Trust
