= Cornish Way =

Cycle route in Cornwall, England

Coordinates: 50.826°N 4.547°W

Cornish Way logo

The Cornish Way is a cycle route which is part of the National Cycle Network that links Bude to Land's End. The route is via Padstow or St Austell and is 180 miles in length.

== Trails ==
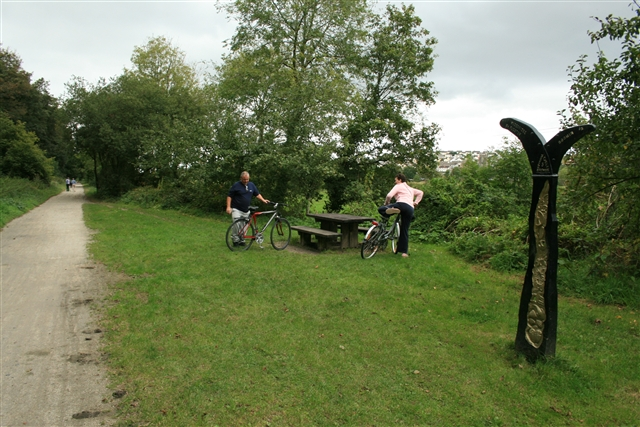
A stopping place on the Camel Trail at the point where the trackbed of the old North Cornwall Railway joins the Camel Trail

The First and Last Trail

From Land's End to Hayle

The Engine House Trail

Part of the Mineral Tramway Trails from Hayle to Truro

The Coast and Clay Trail

Truro to Bodmin via St Austell

The North Cornwall Trail

Bodmin to county boundary near Bude

The St Piran Trail

Truro to Padstow via Newquay

The Camel Trail

This offroad section leads from Padstow to Bodmin.

== See also ==
- Mineral Tramway Trails - the mineral tramways trails are a series of trails located in mid west Cornwall.
- Clay Trails - cycleway near St Austell and the Eden Project
- Sustrans - a charity promoting sustainable transport in the UK
