= Basset Mines =

Mining company in Cornwall, England

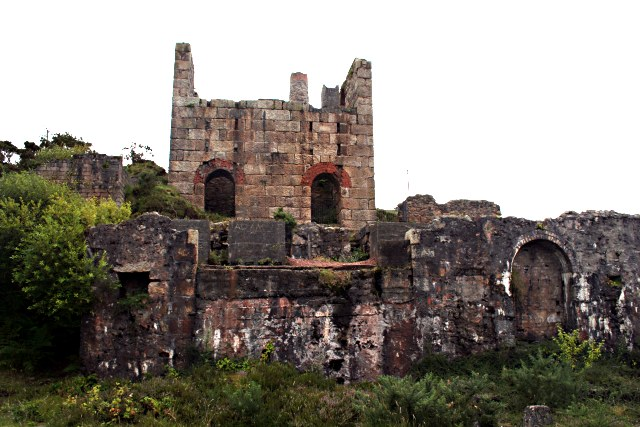
- Engine House at Wheal Basset Stamps
- Industry: Mining
- Founded: 1896
- Defunct: 1918
- Headquarters: Redruth, Cornwall, England

Location in Cornwall

Basset Mines was a mining company formed in Cornwall, England, by the amalgamation of six copper and tin mining setts. It operated from 1896 until 1918, when it was closed due to a fall in the price of tin. The area was granted World Heritage status in 2006, and many of its ruined buildings are still accessible to the public.

== Background ==
The Basset mines were to the south of Camborne in the parish of Illogan, on the North west side of Carn Brea. The company was formed in 1896 when six different mining setts that had been operated from the 1830s were amalgamated.

The South Wheal Frances, West Wheal Basset and Wheal Basset Mines were all worked for copper in the 18th and 19th centuries. South Wheal Frances adjoins the West Wheal Basset to the north, Wheal Basset to the east and Grenville United to the southwest. South Wheal Frances was named for Frances Basset the only child of Francis Basset (1757–1835), first Lord de Dunstanville and Basset. West Wheal Basset was started as a copper mine in 1835. Sixty years later, as part of Basset Mines, it employed 300 men, 90 women and 30 boys. Wheal Basset is another of the mines that have "Basset" in their name, after the Basset family of Tehidy. Between 1815 and 1900 it produced 94,200 tons of 2.5% copper ore and 13,178 tons of black tin.

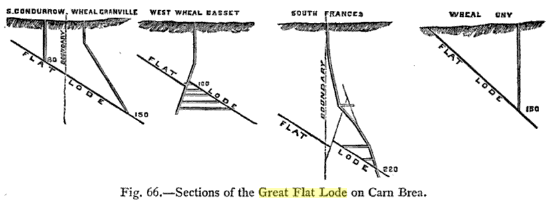
Sections of the Great Flat Lode: South Condurrow/Wheal Granville, West Wheal Basset, South Frances, Wheal Uny

Most of the shallow workings were exhausted in the 1820s and 1830s. Steam-powered pumps were used to keep the mines dry as the shafts were sunk deeper. By the 1850s the mines employed several thousand men, women and children. The setts that became the Basset Mines were most profitable in the 1850s and 1860s, extracting copper. Production was cut back in the late 1860s when the price of copper declined, and some mines went below the copper lodes for tin. The tin deposits were deeper and the ores harder to dress than copper, and profits were lower. The Great Flat Lode was reached around 1872–74. This is a large tin deposit to the south of Carn Brea that is tilted at an average angle of about 32 degrees. Most lodes tilt at 60 degrees or more so the lode is relatively flat, hence the name.

The Wheal Basset stamps engine house was built in 1868, with an unusual configuration of two separate beam engines. The new stamps at the West Basset Mine were made by the Tuckingmill Foundry. The settling and buddling floor was opened in 1875. An additional buddle floor opened in 1892. Production of tin steadily grew in the second half of the 19th century, and by the 1880s had overtaken copper.

When the old part of the Wheal Basset sett was stopped, flooding from the mine affected West Basset and West Wheal Frances and old Wheal Basset pumping engine was kept working. A massive pumping engine house was built at Pascoe's Shaft at South Wheal Frances. It held an 80 inches (2,000 mm) engine, the largest that the St Austell Foundry ever built, that was started in 1888. The South Wheal Frances company reorganised as South Frances United Mines in 1892. South Frances United included South Wheal Frances and West Wheal Basset, which had been running at a loss for several years. Additional buddles and Cornish frames were erected at West Basset in 1892.

== Combined operation ==
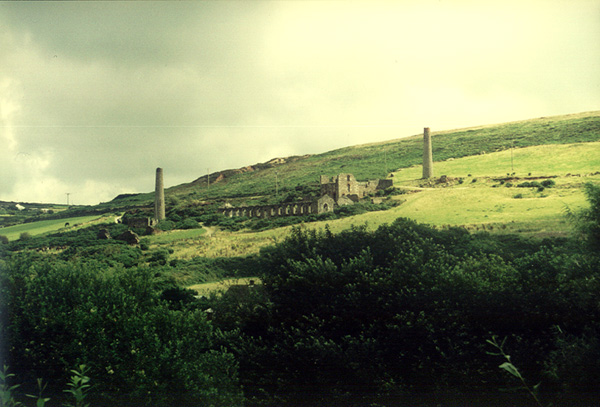
Wheal Bassett

Basset Mines Ltd. was formed in 1896 as a union of South Frances United, Wheal Basset (and North Wheal Basset) and West Wheal Frances Mines. Boundary disputes caused by miners accidentally crossing into the sett of a neighbouring mine were resolved by the merger. After the merger the ore was hoisted at South Wheal Frances and crushed and dressed at West Basset stamps about 1 mile (1.6 km) away. The boiler house had a row of six Lancashire boilers and provided steam for the whole operation. A Brunton calciner was installed at Wheal Basset stamps in 1897.

Between 1896 and 1899 a major refurbishment of the South Wheal Frances shaft was undertaken, enabling mining down to 6,000 feet (1,800 m). By 1900 the Basset Mines manager was no longer able to get the skilled labour need to work the buddles and proposed using vanners (Note: A vanner is a mechanical device using water to separate out the ore's components. The Irishman William B. Frue invented an improved device that was widely adopted in the mining industry, known as the Frue vanner.) in their place. They were installed in a building erected over six of the 1892 buddles just below the stamps. Frue Vanners were installed at the West Basset stamps in 1906. A Frue vanner house was installed below the Wheal Basset stamps in 1908. The "Miner Dry" at Wheal Francis, a building where miners changed from their working clothes after a shift and hung the clothes to dry on large steam pipes, was completed in 1908.

At the time of his death in September 1918 Francis Oats (1848–1918) was chairman of Basset Mines. Basset Mines shut down in December 1918 due to a slump in the price of tin after the end of World War I (1914–18). The company failed in 1919. Total output from the mines before and after the merger was 290,118 tons of copper and 43,134 tons of tin.

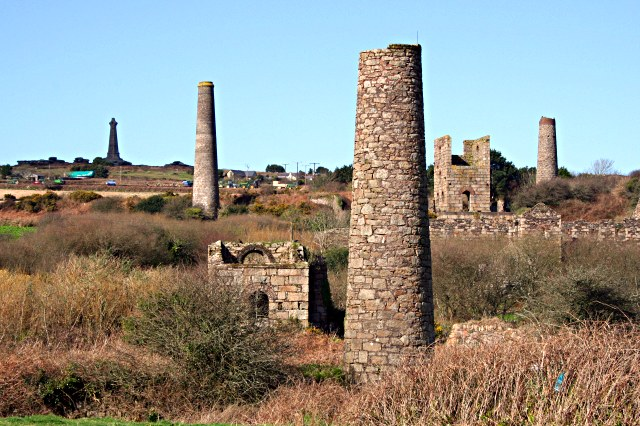
West Bassett Stamps

== Recent years ==
The area was granted World Heritage status on 14 July 2006. The 7.5 miles (12.1 km) Great Flat Lode Trail leads around all the major mines in the Camborne-Redruth area, making a circuit of the Carn Brea granite hill, with many information boards explaining the sites. Most of the shafts were plugged by the Kerrier District Council in the 1990s. Many ruined buildings are still accessible to the public. Surviving buildings include the Marriott's Shaft complex of South Wheal Frances, West Basset Stamps and Wheal Basset Stamps. The West Basset Stamps, which had a secondary beam engine to pump water for dressing, stands over an unusually fine example of a 19th-century tin dressing floor. The Marriott's Shaft complex includes the pumping engine house, which held the only inverted beam engine in Cornwall, the houses for the winding, compressor and crusher engines, and the miners' dry.

== Sources ==
- "Basset", Cornish Mining World Heritage, archived from the original on 26 August 2016
- "Basset Mines, Carn Brea, Camborne - Redruth - St Day District, Cornwall, England, UK", Mindat
- Bolitho, Bob (11 September 1918), "Death of Mr. F. Oats of St Just", The Cornishman, archived from the original on 13 July 2014
- Gamble, Barry (1 April 2011), Cornish Mines: St Just to Redruth, Alison Hodge Publishers, ISBN 978-0-906720-81-3
- Hunt, Robert (1887), British Mining: A Treatise on the History, Discovery, Practical Development and Future Prospects of Metalliferous Mines in the United Kingdom, Lockwood
- Neaverson, Peter; Palmer, Marilyn (12 October 2012), Industrial Archaeology: Principles and Practice, Routledge, ISBN 978-1-134-70508-5
- "The Basset Mines", Cornish Mining Images
- "Wheal Basset Mine, Cornwall", Cornwall in Focus
- "Wheal Frances Mine, Cornwall", Cornwall Calling
- Young, Otis E. Jr.; Lenon, Robert (1 June 1977), Western Mining: An Informal Account of Precious-Metals Prospecting, Placering, Lode Mining, and Milling on the American Frontier from Spanish Times to 1893, University of Oklahoma Press, ISBN 978-0-8061-1352-4
