= List of routes in Zone 4 of the National Cycle Network =

Biking route list

This is a list of National Cycle Routes in Zone 4 of the numbering scheme, namely: London (Greenwich) to Fishguard, in Wales, via Reading, Bath, Bristol, Newport, Caerphilly, Pontypridd, Swansea and Llanelli.

== Single- and double-digits ==
Route name/number	From	To	Via	Notes
National Cycle Route 4	Greenwich (Cutty Sark)	Fishguard	Bath, Bristol, Newport, Swansea, Carmarthen, Tenby, Haverfordwest, St. Davids	Incorporates the Celtic Trail from Chepstow to Fishguard. It is 432 miles long and the terrain is variable.
	Bristol	Rugby	Gloucester, Stratford-upon-Avon	It is 105 miles long and the route consists of on-road paths, bridleways and traffic free paths, the terrain is mainly flat. The path passes through Leigh Woods via Avon Gorge, Berkeley Castle and Gloucester Cathedral.
NCR 42	Glasbury	Gloucester	Abergavenny, Chepstow, Hay-on-Wye	Section between Gloucester and Chepstow under construction. The 64-mile route consists of quiet roads but has large climbs. The route is close to Brecon Beacons National Park.
NCR 43	Swansea	Builth Wells	Clydach, Ystalyfera, Caehopkin, Llanwrtyd Wells	This route is under construction.
NCR 44	Shrewsbury, Shropshire	Cinderford, Gloucestershire	Ludlow, Hereford	This route is 52 miles long and is based on country lanes and roads. It connects with the Six Castles Cycleway.
NCR 45	Chester	Salisbury	Whitchurch, Ironbridge, Droitwich Spa, Worcester, Gloucester, Cirencester, Swindon	The 270-mile route leads via Shrewsbury, Bridgnorth and Stroud.
NCR 46	Bromsgrove	Neath	Worcester, Hereford, Merthyr Tydfil	The route is 80 miles long but has large gaps.
National Cycle Route 47	Newport	Fishguard	Carmarthen, Llanelli, Swansea	The 128-mile route is mainly of minor quiet roads and is close to the Pembrokeshire Coast National Park. It forms part of the Celtic Trail West which leads to Chepstow.
NCR 48	Lincoln	Exeter	Dartmoor, Leicester, Cirencester	The 69-mile route is opened between Cirencester, Northleach, Moreton-in-Marsh and Southam where joins onto Route 41 which leads to Royal Leamington Spa. The route travels through Watermead Country Park.
	Newport	Abergavenny	Pontymoile, Mamhilad, Cwmbran, Pontypool	The 20-mile route goes along a canal and is near Blaenavon.

== Triple-digits ==
Route name/number	From	To	Via	Notes
NCR 403	NCR 4 (Semington)	NCR 4 (Great Bedwyn)	Chippenham, Marlborough	The 41-mile route is mainly on road with short traffic-free sections. It passes near Savernake Forest and North Wessex Downs.
NCR 410; Avon Cycleway	Circular route		Thornbury, Yate, Clevedon, Avonmouth, Coalpit Heath.	The 85-mile route was opened in 1989 by the Avon County Council and became part of the National Cycle Network in 2013.
NCR 416	NCR 410 at Pucklechurch	Yate	Westerleigh	Proposed route
NCR 423	Cwmbran	Ross-on-Wye	Usk, Monmouth, Llanbadoc, Raglan, Dingestow, Coed-y-Paen.	The 28-mile route has very steep sections.
NCR 425	Burgess Park, Camberwell	Rotherhithe	Durand's Wharf, South Bermondsey, Lewisham, Peckham. Connects with London Cycle Network.	The 8.1 km route is very close to pedestrian bridges.
NCR 426	Skenfrith	NCR 46 at Kentchurch	Droitwich, Neath, Garway.	The route is very scenic: it goes along Monnow Valley and goes through woodland such as Little Corras Wood and Castlefield Wood.
NCR 436	Aberdulais	Pontneddfechan	Seven Sisters	Proposed route
NCR 437	Ystalyfera	Kidwelly	Ammanford, Cross Hands	Proposed route
NCR 438	Pontardawe	Brynamman		Proposed route
NCR 439	Ammanford	Penclawdd	Pontarddulais, Gowerton	Proposed route
NCR 442	Worcester	Oxford	Evesham, Pershore, Hinton on the Green, Honeybourne, Hanborough	The route runs parallel to the Cotswold Line railway.
NCR 446	Carmarthen	Llandysul		Proposed route
NCR 447	Newcastle Emlyn	Abergwili		Proposed route
NCR 448	Cardigan, Wales	Crymych		Proposed route
NCR 449	Fishguard	Haverfordwest		Proposed route
NCR 451	Nantwich	Sandbach	Crewe	The 10-mile route is 50% traffic-free path and 50% on-road. The route is very close to local sports centres
NCR 455	Oswestry	Ellesmere	Gobowen, Hindford	
NCR 461	Farnham Common	Windsor	Slough, Eton Dorney, Chalvey	The 4-mile route goes past Jubilee River, Windsor Castle and River Thames.
NCR 465	Llanhilleth	Brynmawr	Aberbeeg, Abertillery, Blaina, Nantyglo	The 10-mile route is made of tarmac and has an easy gradient. It passes through the Six Bells Colliery and River Ebbw.
NCR 466	Pontypool	Ebbw Vale	Cwm, Crumlin, Swffryd, Hafodyrynys	The 9-mile route is currently under construction.
NCR 467	Newbridge	NCR 46 (Sirhowy Valley)	Blackwood, Tredegar, Argoed	The 8-mile route is mostly incomplete.
NCR 468	Aberbargoed	New Tredegar	Parc Coetir Bargoed, Rhymney Valley, Pontlottyn	The route is 8 miles long and is mostly wooded.
NCR 469	Bargoed	Fochriw		The 8-mile route has an easy gradient for cyclists.
NCR 475	Caerphilly	Senghenydd	Abertridwr	
NCR 476	Trelewis	Parc Taff Bargoed		The short 2-mile route is a great spot for birdwatching.
NCR 477; Trevithick Trail	NCR 8 at Edwardsville	Merthyr Tydfil	Merthyr Vale, Pentrebach	
NCR 478; Cynon Trail	Abercynon	Llwydcoed	Mountain Ash, Aberdare	Missing link at Cwmbach
NCR 482	Marlborough	NCR 45 at Chiseldon	Ogbourne St George	
NCR 492	Cwmbran	Brynmawr	Pontypool, Blaenavon	
