= Lansalson branch line =

Former railway line in Cornwall, England

Lansalson branch line (Trenance valley line)

Overview
- Status: Closed
- Locale: Cornwall

Service
- Type: Heavy rail
- Operator(s): Great Western Railway, British Railways

History
- Opened: 1920
- Closed: 1968

Technical
- Track gauge: 4 ft 8 1/2 in (1,435 mm)

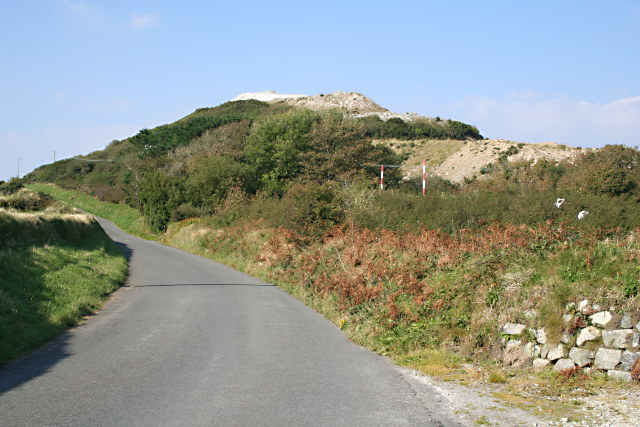
China Clay Waste Tip on Trenance Downs

The Lansalson branch line (also known as the Trenance valley line) was a railway line built by the Great Western Railway (GWR) to serve the china clay industry in the Trenance valley near St Austell in Cornwall, UK. The line was authorised by the GWR in 1910 and after setbacks due to World War I the line opened to Bojea Sidings on 1 May 1920 for mineral and goods traffic only, and to Lansalson Sidings on 24 May 1920. It closed in 1968.

== China Clay ==
The mineral known as china clay in the UK, and as kaolinite in other countries, was discovered in large quantities in the 1830s, lying north and north-west of St Austell. Much of the output was carted to Charlestown Harbour at first, and then to Pentewan over the Pentewan Railway. As railways developed in Cornwall a number of direct access points connected the deposits, but the area close to St Austell was not among them, notwithstanding a proposal to extend the Pentewan Railway there in the 1880s.

The china clay industry was subjected to heavy swings in its trade cycle, and a slump in 1903-4 was followed by an upsurge.

== A branch line ==
The Great Western Railway decided to connect the Lansalson area by a short branch line running north up the river valley; engineering difficulties were minimal although the gradient would be heavy. The GWR authorised construction on 26 July 1910, but little progress was made before the onset of World War I, and work was suspended.

A resumption was made at the end of hostilities, and the line opened to Bojea Sidings on 1 May 1920 and throughout to Lansalson Sidings on 24 May 1920. The line was single, with intermediate sidings operated by ground frame.

== Route ==
The line was 1m 53c (2.5 km) in length. It left the Cornish Main Line at Trenance Junction, 600 yards (500 m) west of St Austell railway station, immediately east of Trenance Viaduct. It turned north and passed Carlyon Farm kiln in the village of Trethowel; a short distance north were Bojea sidings. The line crossed the road to Bodmin (B3274) then past Lower Ruddle wharf to Boskell sidings, then crossing to the western side of the St Austell or White River. The line terminated at Lansalson wharf in the village of Ruddlemoor.

The gradient was 1 in 40 rising from Trenance Junction, almost without a break.

There was a short length of double track at Trenance Junction, and siding connections at Carlyon Farm, Bojea, Lowell Ruddell, Boskell and Lansalson.

== The site today ==
The line closed to traffic in 1968 but in 2005 the railway bed has been converted into a cycle trail (apart from a small section due to a land usage disagreement) from Tremena Gardens in St Austell to the Wheal Martyn china clay country park. The cycle trail forms part of a series called the Clay Trails. The sections relevant to this former railway line are the Wheal Martyn trail and the St Austell Trail.
