= National Cycle Route 46 =

Cycle route from Bromsgrove in England to Neath in Wales

NCN Route 46
- Length: 92.5 miles (148.9 km)
- Location: United Kingdom
- Designation: UK National Cycle Network
- Trailheads: North: Bromsgrove; South: Neath
- Website: www.sustrans.org.uk

National Cycle Network (NCN) Route 46 is a Sustrans National Route that runs from Bromsgrove to Neath.

== Route ==
=== Bromsgrove to Worcester ===
Bromsgrove | Droitwich Spa | Worcester

The route begins in Bromsgrove town centre on road before opening out onto country lanes which lead to Droitwich Spa. Here the route joins the Droitwich Canal towpath. Alternatively, here one can join National Cycle Route 45.

Leaving the towpath, NCR46 then passes through residential streets, country lanes and another short section of the canal before reaching Worcester city centre and the River Severn.

=== Worcester to Hereford ===
Worcester | Malvern | Hereford

NCR46 continues to follow the River Severn, but the connection to Hereford is still under development. There is a short section of NCR46 in Malvern, which has been changed from National Cycle Route 45.

=== Hereford to Abergavenny ===
Hereford | Abergavenny

Leaving Hereford, the route takes country lanes, branching before Kentchurch onto the National Cycle Route 426. The NCR46 continues through Kentchurch and over the Welsh border. There is a link between NCR46 and National Cycle Route 42 along this section until they meet in Abergavenny.

=== Brynmawr to Clwydyfagwyr (Merthyr Tydfil) ===
Known as the Heads of the Valleys Route, this section of NCR46 has a mixture of major and minor roads as well as off-road trails. Out of the 60miles of this route, 40miles are segregated from traffic. This includes towpaths, disused railway trails and tarmac cycle paths. Beginning in Gwent Valley, this section of the route ends in Merthyr Tydfil.

=== Cynon Valley to Neath ===
The NCR46 continues through Cynon Valley and ends in Neath. Cyclists can travel onwards from NCR46 to National Cycle Route 47.
