= Taff Trail =

Walking and cycling track in South Wales

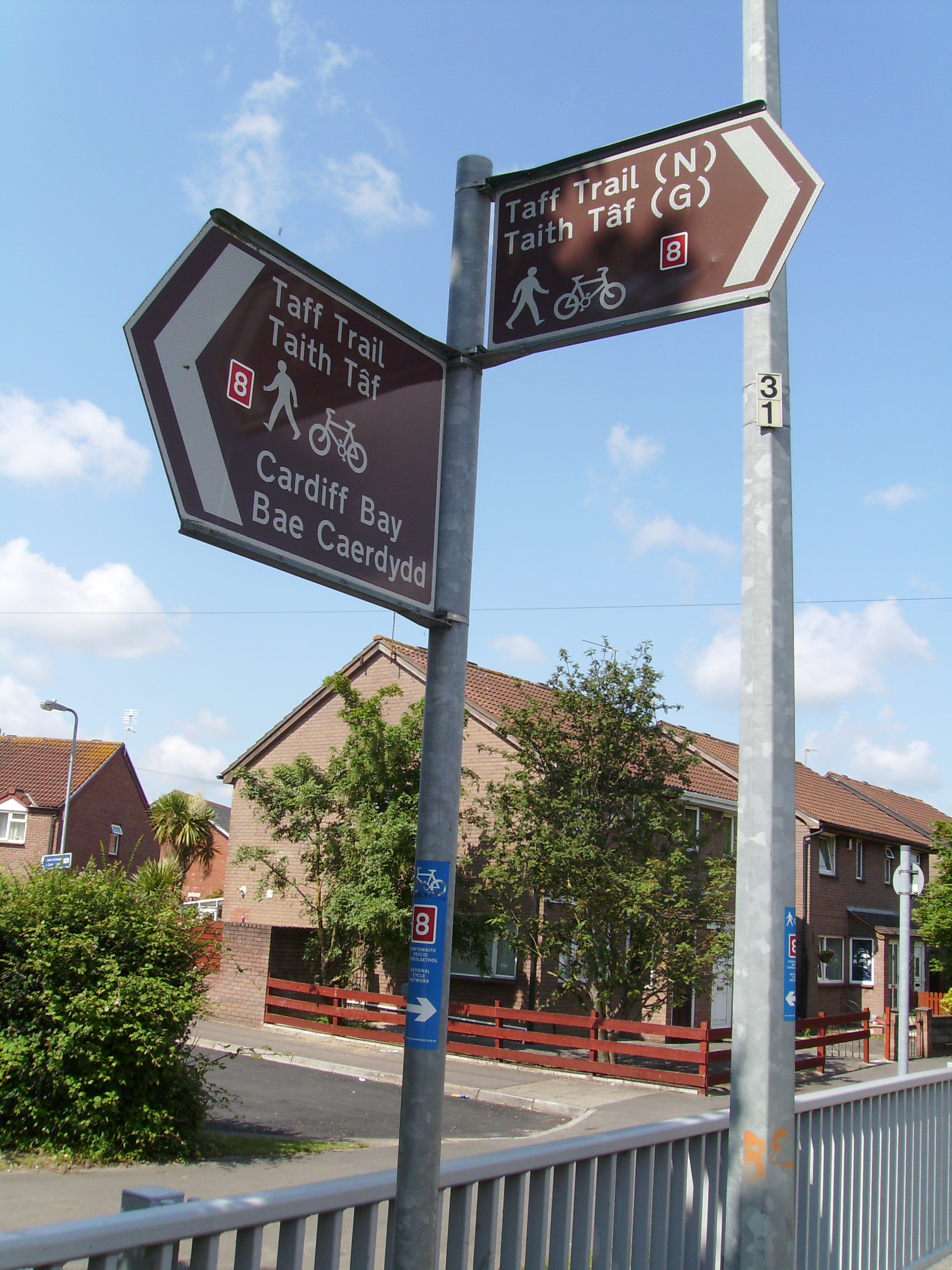
Taff Trail cycle route sign

The Taff Trail (Welsh: Taith Taf) is a walking and cycle path that runs for 55 miles (89 km) between Cardiff Bay and Brecon in Wales. It is so named because it follows the course of the River Taff. Along much of its length, it follows the National Cycle Network Route 8 (Lôn Las Cymru) that continues to Holyhead, and is substantially off-road.

== History ==
The trail was launched in September 1988 by Sir Wyn Roberts, Minister of State for the Welsh Office. The project was initiated and co-ordinated by the Merthyr and Cynon Groundwork Trust, with the co-operation of the local councils through whose areas the trail passes. Financial and logistical support was given by the Welsh Development Agency and by Sustrans, a sustainable transport charity.

Before the trail, there were several similar but disconnected routes in the area. Taff Ely borough council had created cycling routes within its boundaries, Cardiff city council had provided the Three Castles Cycle Route from Caerphilly into Cardiff, and the Brecon Beacons National Park was developing leisure trails to encourage the use of the park. The Groundwork Trust for Merthyr Tydfil and Rhondda Cynon Taf saw a need for the co-ordination of these efforts, and the Taff Trail was born.

In more recent times, there have been criticisms of the Taff Trail, both for being almost universally shared with pedestrians whenever it is segregated, and for being too narrow. Crashes have occurred along much of the Trail, with Cardiff Council promising to widen much of the route in their local area.

== The route ==
The trail makes much use of an abandoned branch of the Taff Vale Railway and of the Glamorganshire Canal. These had been built in the 18th and 19th centuries to transport coal and iron ore from Merthyr Tydfil, the Cynon Valley and the Rhondda valley to the docks at Cardiff and Barry. The canals had become disused due to competition from the railways, and the railways in turn had become surplus to requirements as the heavy industries upon which they depended had been wound down. These routes, which although disused had remained largely intact, proved ideal for the needs of the trail, providing a convenient path along the narrow Taff valley.

=== Cardiff ===
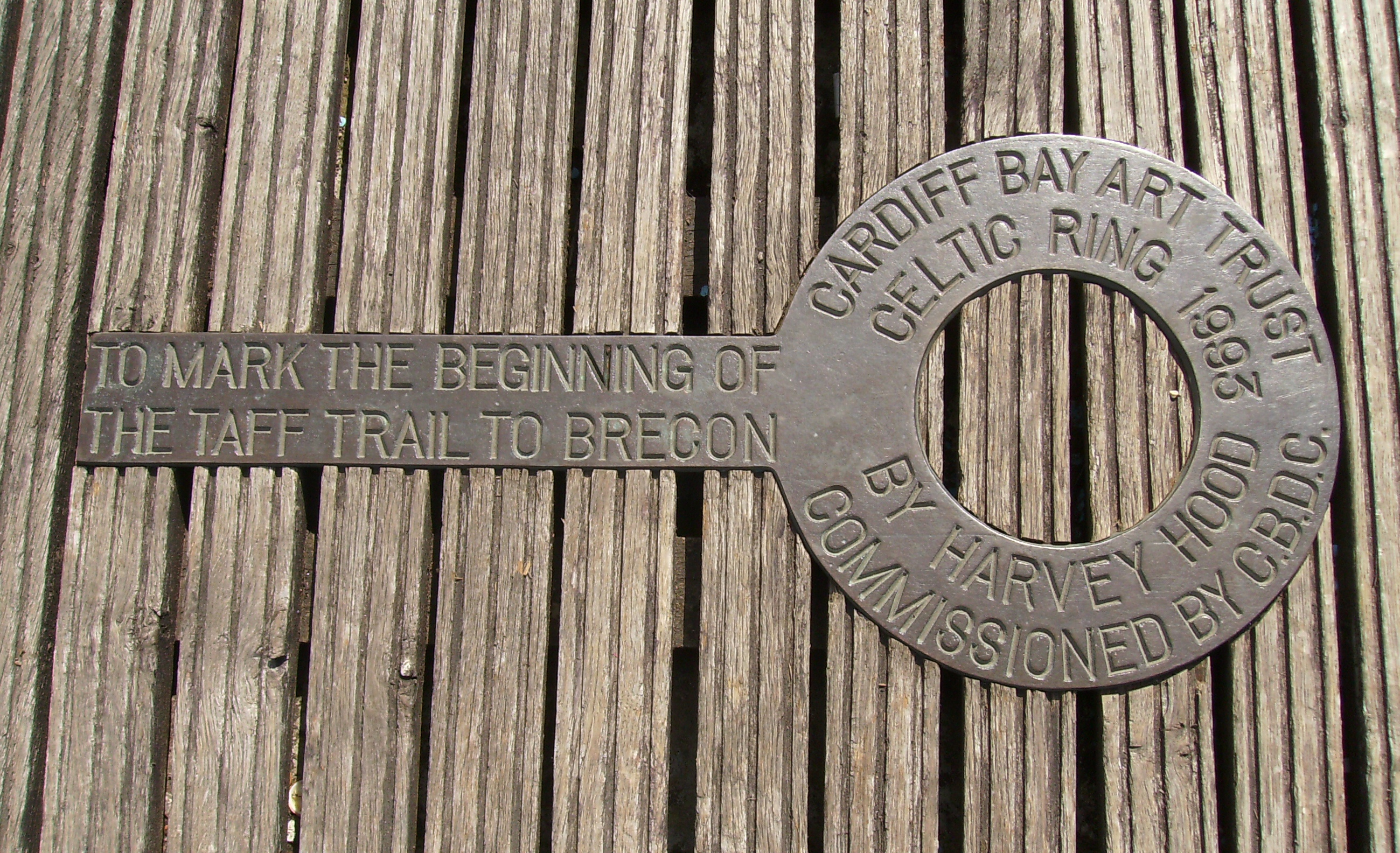
The start of the Taff Trail, inside The Celtic Ring sculpture.

The trail begins in Roald Dahl Plass in Cardiff Bay, at a sculpture named The Celtic Ring, created especially for the trail by Harvey Hood (51.4632°N 3.1641°W). Travelling west, it crosses the Taff and follows the river north through the centre of Cardiff along the Taff Embankment. It passes within 50 yards (46 m) of Cardiff Central railway station and of the Millennium Stadium in the city centre, before winding through Sophia Gardens, passing the home of Glamorgan County Cricket Club.

The trail continues along the Taff through Pontcanna Fields & Llandaff Fields, and crosses the pedestrian bridge at Blackweir. It then follows the eastern bank of the Taff past Blackweir Lodge, under the A48 road flyover, past Llandaff Weir (Llandaff Rowing Club is visible on the opposite bank) near Howell's School, Llandaff Cathedral and the BBC Wales studios, and through Hailey Park in Llandaff North. In this area (as with most of the path within Cardiff Council boundaries) pedestrians have been given priority, despite the national cycle route status of the trail. Especially on fair weather days, cyclists must proceed slowly due to pedestrian congestion and dog walkers.

It then moves inland for a short distance, before rejoining the river back close to Forest Farm, and continues along the river past Radyr Weir and under the M4 motorway.

=== Tongwynlais ===
After passing underneath the A470 dual carriageway, the Trail reaches the village of Tongwynlais. As well as shops, pubs, a café, and a cycle shop, it is home to the Gothic fantasy castle, Castell Coch. The Castell Coch grounds act as a lay by near the visitor centre, the Fforest fawr car park has been used by cyclists as a base to ascend the hills. Downhill mountain biking is a focal point to ride the 27 trails surrounding the castle grounds. At Tongwynlais, the trail splits into two. The high-level route climbs the steep hill to Castell Coch, then up a very steep path (best avoided in muddy conditions), and along a forest track of sharp stones. The low-level route is tarmacked and runs below the castle, adjacent to Taff's Well railway station and then climbs steadily for 1.5 miles (2.4 km) along the former Rhymney Railway, until it rejoins the high-level route just before the Nantgarw bypass.

Here the route turns left off the main path - an easy turn to miss - and crosses the bypass, joining National Cycle Network Route 4 (known in Wales as the Celtic Trail). Route 4 stretches from London in the east to St David's in the west, and runs along with the Taff Trail as far as Pontypridd.

=== Pontypridd ===
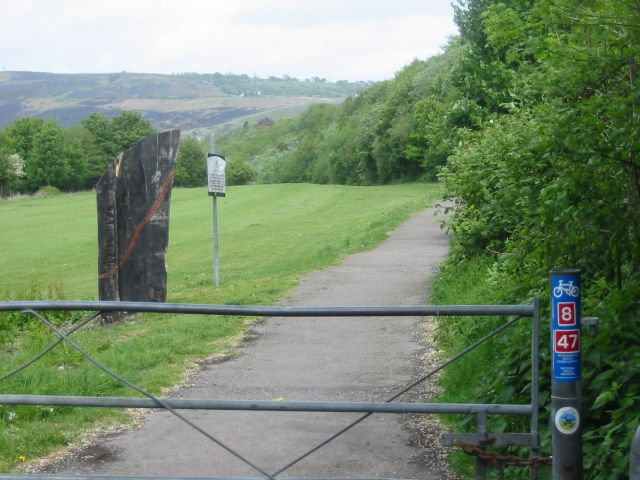
The Taff Trail north of Pontypridd

The trail proceeds along the former Alexandra (Newport Docks) Docks & Railway Company line towards Rhydyfelin. At Rhydyfelin, the Trail emerges briefly to cross a minor road, before continuing through the Glyntaff Farm housing estate and passing along the length of Glyntaff Cemetery.

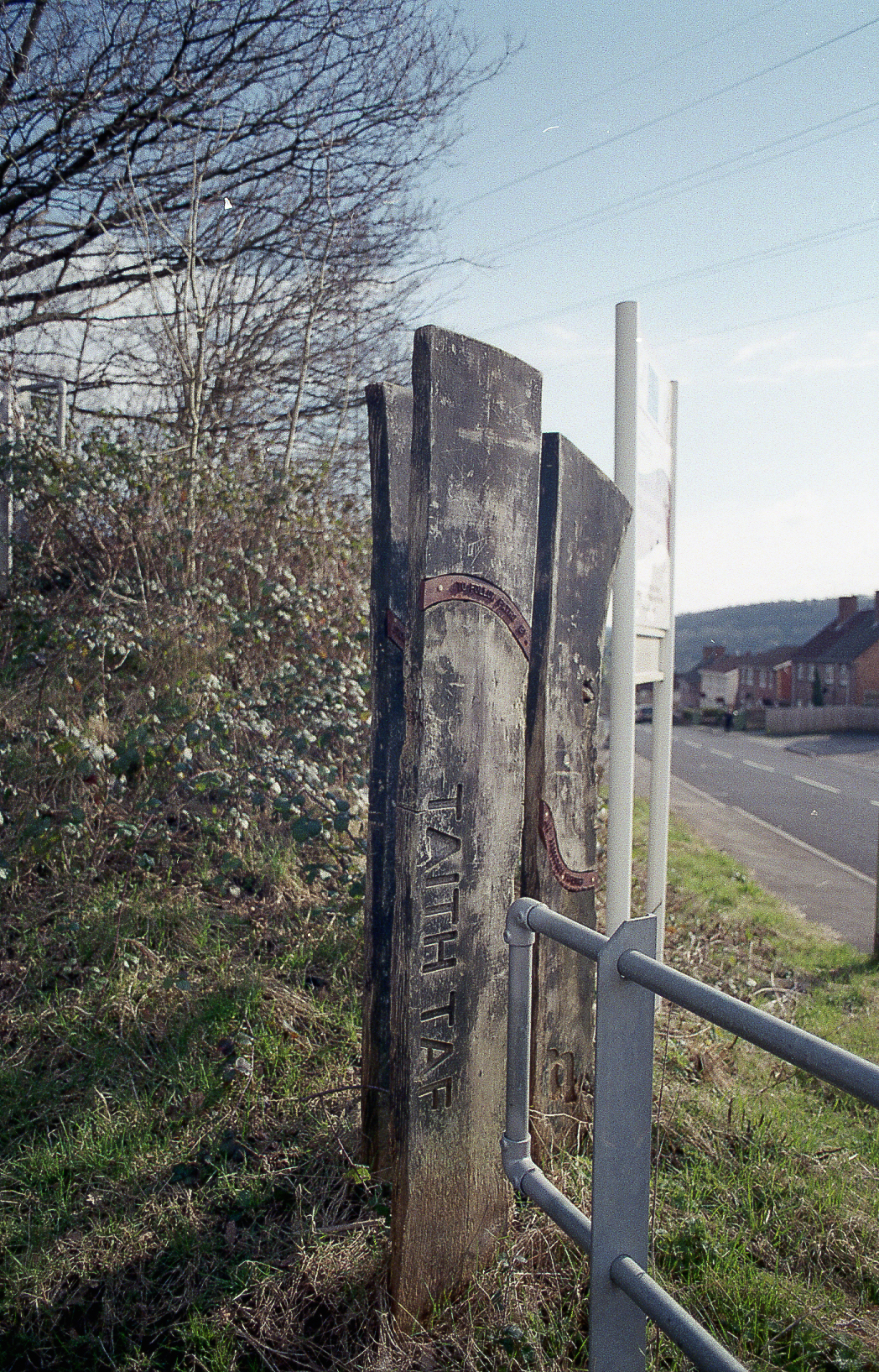
Wooden sign marking the Taff Trail Rhydyfelin.

After the cemetery, the Trail joins Cilfynydd Road. The former route continued along the road for half a mile, before leading into the northern end of Pontypridd town centre. However, the trail is now signposted to cross a pedestrian bridge and pass through Ynysangharad Park. At the northern exit from the park, users may wish to take a short (50 yards) detour to visit the Old Bridge in Pontypridd. Cyclists may wish to use the bike locks outside the cafe promenade opposite the Northern exit of the park.

=== Abercynon ===
The Trail continues north-west on-road through Trallwng, before becoming traffic-free for a stretch, rejoining the Taff along the way. North of Cilfynydd, a permissive path alongside the Taff has been opened to avoid the previous road route between Cilfynydd and Abercynon. At Abercynon, the Trail follows the route of the Merthyr Tramroad, used by Richard Trevithick's Penydarren steam locomotive. This stretch has been recently upgraded, but the original stone tramroad sleepers can be seen at the side of the gravel track.

=== Aberfan ===
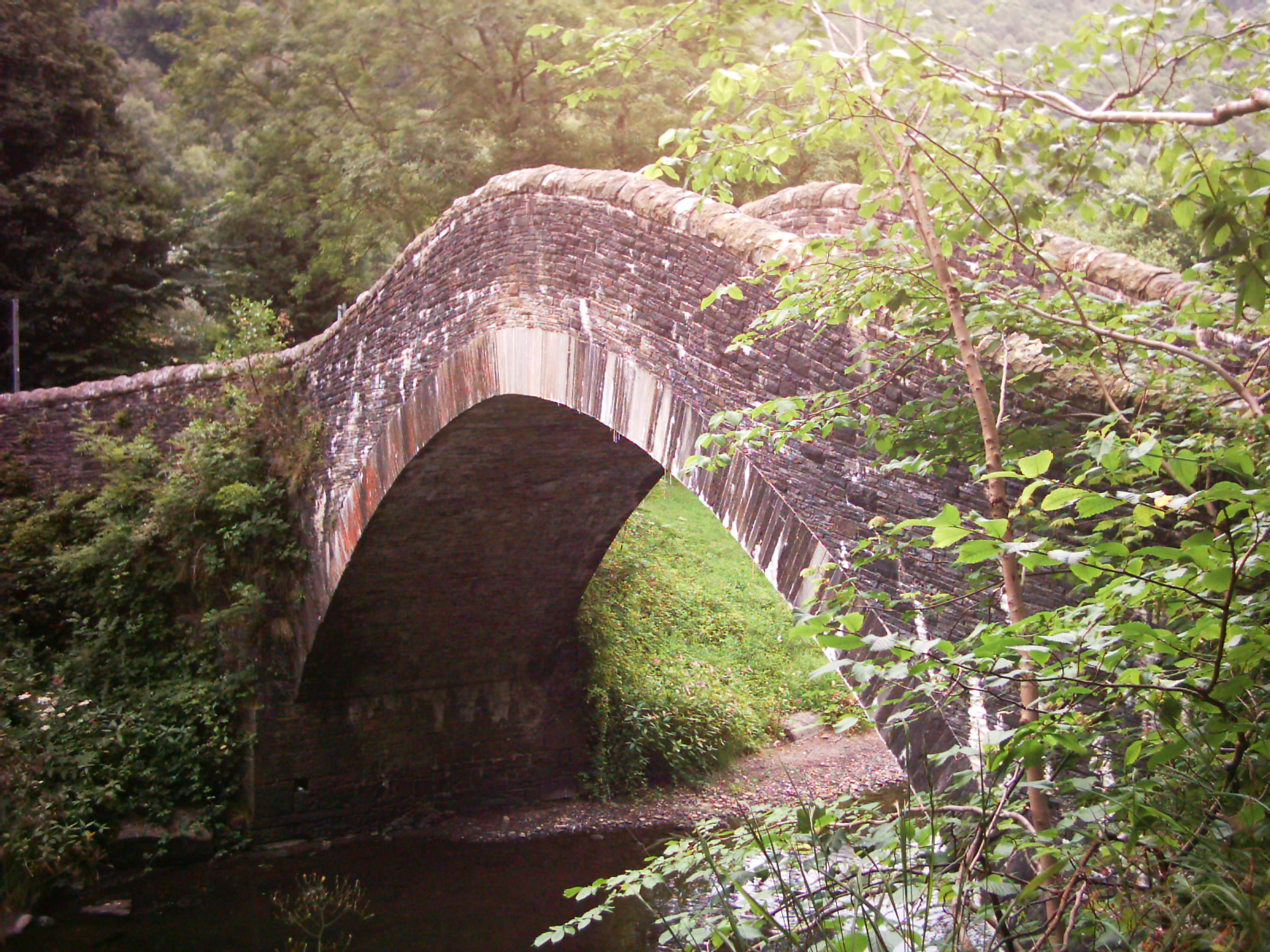
The bridge at Pontygwaith

At Pontygwaith, the Trail climbs steeply above the A470 by means of some steps. It then follows above the A470 as far as Aberfan, where it descends below the road and continues through the mainly residential areas of Aberfan. At this point, it passes the Aberfan Cemetery containing the memorial to the children and teachers who died in the Aberfan disaster. The stretch from Pontygwaith to Merthyr Tydfil follows the route of the former Glamorganshire Canal.

=== Merthyr Tydfil ===
After Aberfan, the trail passes through Troedyrhiw and Abercanaid, before reaching Merthyr Tydfil at the Rhydycar Leisure Centre. From this point, the town centre is around 200 yards (180 m) away over the Taff. It is very easy to get lost in Merthyr, and travellers may find it easier to ignore the Route 8 signs, and follow their road map instead.

=== Brecon ===
From Merthyr, the trail continues across Cefn Coed Viaduct, through Cefn-coed-y-cymmer, then follows the Taf Fechan (the smaller of the two main tributaries of the River Taff) past Pontsticill Reservoir. From Pontsticill to Brecon is about 25 miles (40 km) of remote scenery crossing the Brecon Beacons mountains - partly pretty forest tracks and partly wide open, expansive moorland. There are very steep roads on both sides of the mountain. Descending the mountain, cyclists can avoid the slow rough track on the east side of Talybont Reservoir by taking the road along the west bank, on which traffic is normally very sparse. The route continues along the trackbed of the former Brecon and Merthyr Railway to Talybont-on-Usk, then towards Brecon (51.9444°N 3.3885°W), in the last few kilometres following alongside the Monmouthshire and Brecon Canal.

A second route exists - also called the Taff Trail - from Cefn Coed to Brecon along the Taf Fawr (more or less parallel to the A470 road, but often on the opposite side of the valley) via the Garwnant Visitors Centre. This route is most suitable for walking and horse-riding. Although cycling (pref. mountain bike) is possible in places, it is not nearly so well sign-posted as the Taf Fechan route.

== See also ==
- Rail trail
- Cycling in Cardiff
