= South Wheal Frances Mine =

Former copper and tin mine in Cornwall, England

Coordinates: 50.208°N 5.252°W

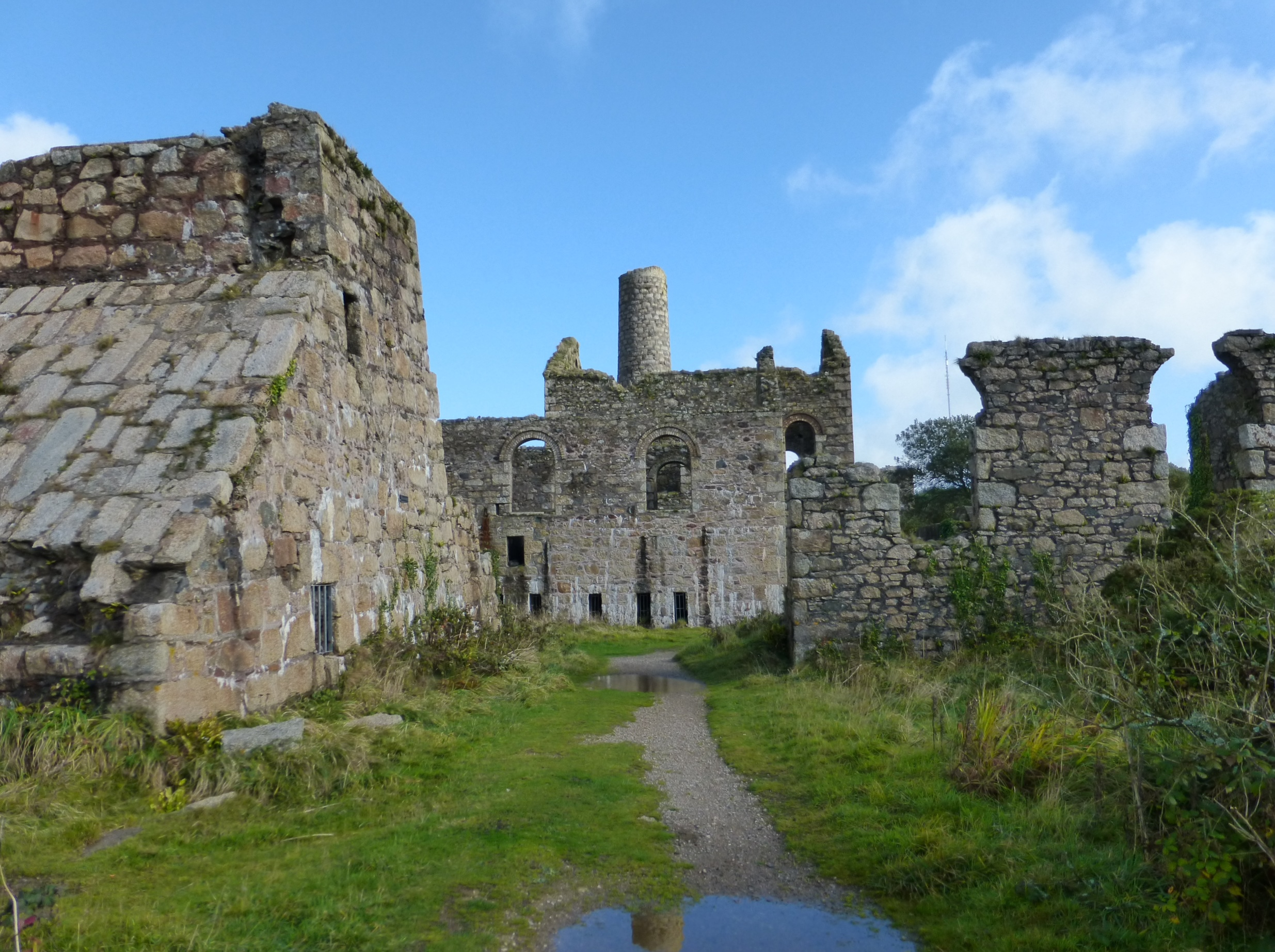
The remains of Wheal Frances

South Wheal Frances is a former mine accessing the copper and tin of the Great Flat Lode south of Camborne in Cornwall, England.

== Mine ==
Mining began in the local area in the early 1720s. Mining for copper was first documented at the site in the 1820s. After Lady Frances Bassett, the mineral Lord, offered a new lease on the land in 1834 production resumed. Tin mining commenced in 1852. The mine complex is centred on Marriott's Shaft which had been sunk by 1845. It was at its most productive between 1844 and 1895. Altogether 67,866 tons of copper and 9,716 tons of tin ores were extracted. After the extent of the Great Flat Lode was discovered in 1872-74 a winding engine house was built at Pascoe's Shaft in 1879 and a pumping engine house housing an 80-inch cylinder was built in 1887.

An engine house with a 75-inch cylinder pumping engine installed at Marriott's shaft in 1847 pumped water from Pascoe's shaft as well as Marriott's. In 1857 a 24-inch winder was installed in close proximity. An engine house housing a 30-inch cylinder engine for both pumping and winding was built at the Daubuz shaft between 1879 and 1881. The shaft was sunk when mining reached the Great Flat Lode and was named after a company shareholder. The mine was owned by South Frances United in 1892 and the company amalgamated with neighbouring Wheal Basset in 1895 becoming the Basset Mines. Between 1896 and 1899 a major refurbishment of the shaft was undertaken, enabling mining to take places as far down as 6,000 feet.

By the early 20th century, several thousand men, women, bal maidens, and children worked in the mine. A slump in tin prices during World War I led to the mine's closure in 1918.

== Remains ==
The site of the mine is marked by extensive remains around Marriott's and Pascoe's shafts. The surviving features include the derelict, roofless winding engine house to Marriott's shaft that was built in the 1890s. It is constructed of granite rubble with quoins and brick arches to the window openings. As are most remains on the site, it is a Grade II listed building. It contained a horizontal cross-compound engine made by Holman's of Camborne, with 23- and 43-inch cylinders either side of its conical winding drum.

The derelict boiler house at Marriott's shaft is built of granite rubble with quoins at the corners and brick arch openings. Now roofless, it once contained six Lancashire boilers to power a pumping engine, winder, compressor, crusher, and capstan.
