= National Cycle Route 4 =

Cycle route in the United Kingdom

National Cycle Route 4 sign

National Cycle Route 4 (or NCR 4) is a route of the United Kingdom National Cycle Network, running from London to Fishguard, Pembrokeshire. Between these, the route runs through Reading, Bath, Bristol, Newport, Swansea and St David's. Within Wales, sections of the route follow branches of the Celtic Trail cycle route.

== Route ==
The total length of the path is 443.6 miles and takes an estimated 36 hours to complete by bike. Just under half (47.4%) of the route consists in traffic-free paths.

=== London to Reading ===
The route roughly follows the course of the River Thames between London and Reading, and forms a junction with NCR 5 and NCR 23 at the latter.

- Greenwich; Rotherhithe: Surrey Quays; South Bank; Lambeth Bridge; Chelsea; Imperial Wharf; Putney Bridge
- Richmond Park; Ham; Hampton Court Palace; Molesey; Walton on Thames
- Chertsey (touristic town) or Laleham (shorter, towpath route)
- Staines Bridge; Coopers Hill; Windsor Great Park; Windsor; Eton
- Bray; Maidenhead
- Wargrave; Reading

At its east end, the route meanders mostly set about one "block" back from the Thames, including several small parks. It shortcuts through: Rotherhithe and mid-Pimlico. It finds the Thames at the Chelsea Embankment. It zig-zags through Hurlingham and Barnes Common.

It finds the Thames Path at Ham, facing Teddington Lock Footbridges, until Staines-upon-Thames. A longer route from Putney is to remain on the towpath (Thames Path) to avoid traffic.

=== Reading to Bath ===
- Aldermaston
- Newbury
- Hungerford
- Great Bedwyn
- Pewsey
- Devizes
- Trowbridge
- Bradford on Avon
- Bath

Much longer, the Reading to Bath section follows the Kennet & Avon Cycle Route which partly follows the towpath of the Kennet and Avon Canal and the course of the River Kennet, with other sections on low-traffic roads.

Approaching Bath, Route 24 and the Two Tunnels Greenway are a corollary, rejoining Route 4 west of the city centre.

=== Bath to Bristol ===
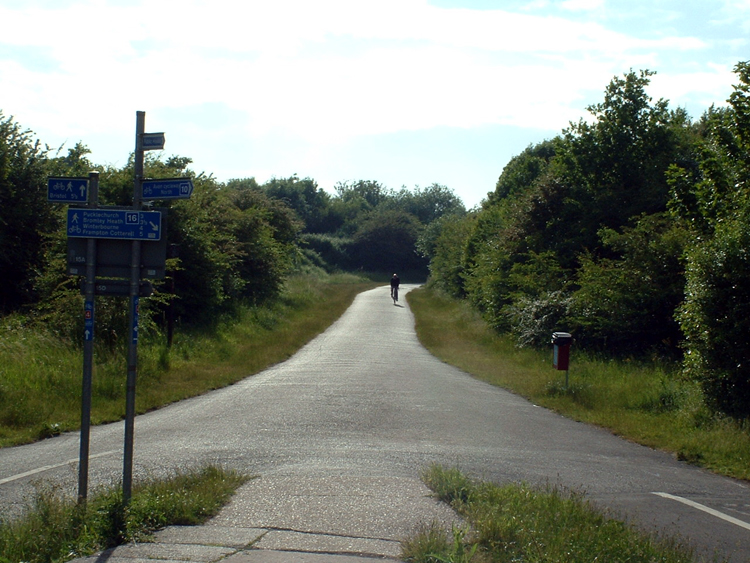
The Bristol & Bath Railway Path is part of Route 4.

- Saltford
- Bitton
- Warmley
- Mangotsfield
- Bristol

The Bath to Bristol section of the route follows the Bristol & Bath Railway Path, a dedicated cycle path on a disused railway line. This is entirely traffic-free.

=== Bristol to Newport ===
- Severn Bridge
- Chepstow
- Caldicot
- Newport

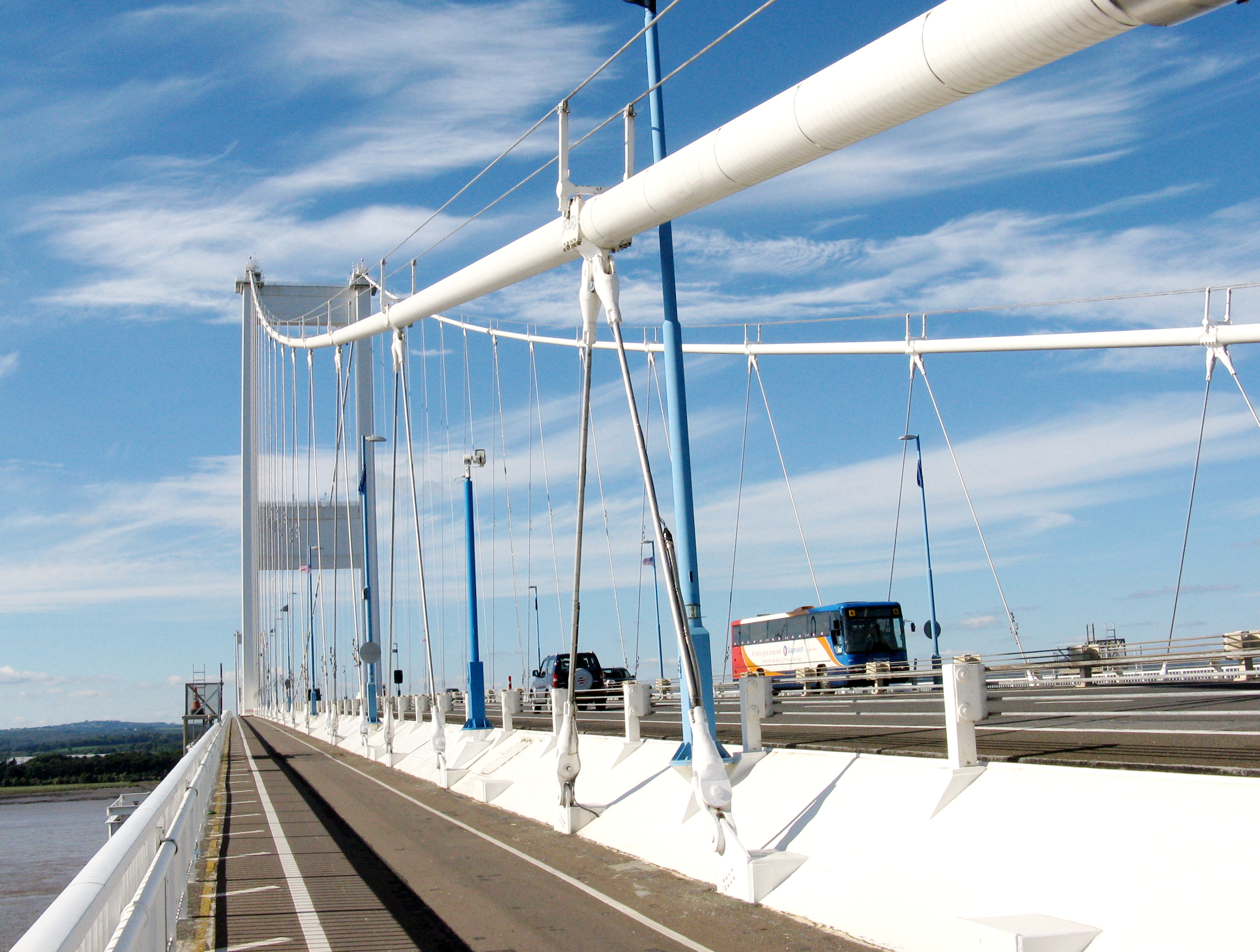
The Severn Bridge crosses the river Severn.

After passing through Bristol city centre, the route heads north into South Gloucestershire, and over the Severn Bridge. Passing through Chepstow, it then goes south, passing through Caldicot before arriving in Newport. The route passes to the north of the Newport Wetlands Reserve and across Newport Transporter Bridge in the south of the city.

=== Newport to Llanelli ===
- Caerphilly
- Pontypridd
- Port Talbot
- Swansea
- Llanelli

After Newport, the route heads west to Caerphilly, then north towards Pontypridd during which it crosses the Taff Trail. It then heads west towards Port Talbot. Near Briton Ferry, it crosses the A48 bridge and then follows the A483 road (Fabian Way) into Swansea and passes through the Maritime Quarter. Just before the Maritime Quarter, it crosses National Cycle Route 43. It then follows the seafront promenade along Swansea Bay to Blackpill where it turns north up the Clyne Valley cycle track passing the village of Dunvant until it reaches Gowerton. In Gowerton, the trail follows public roads to the south of Loughor towards the Loughor bridge. Once over the Loughor bridge it continues along the Millennium Coastal Path to the south of Llanelli.

=== Llanelli to Fishguard ===
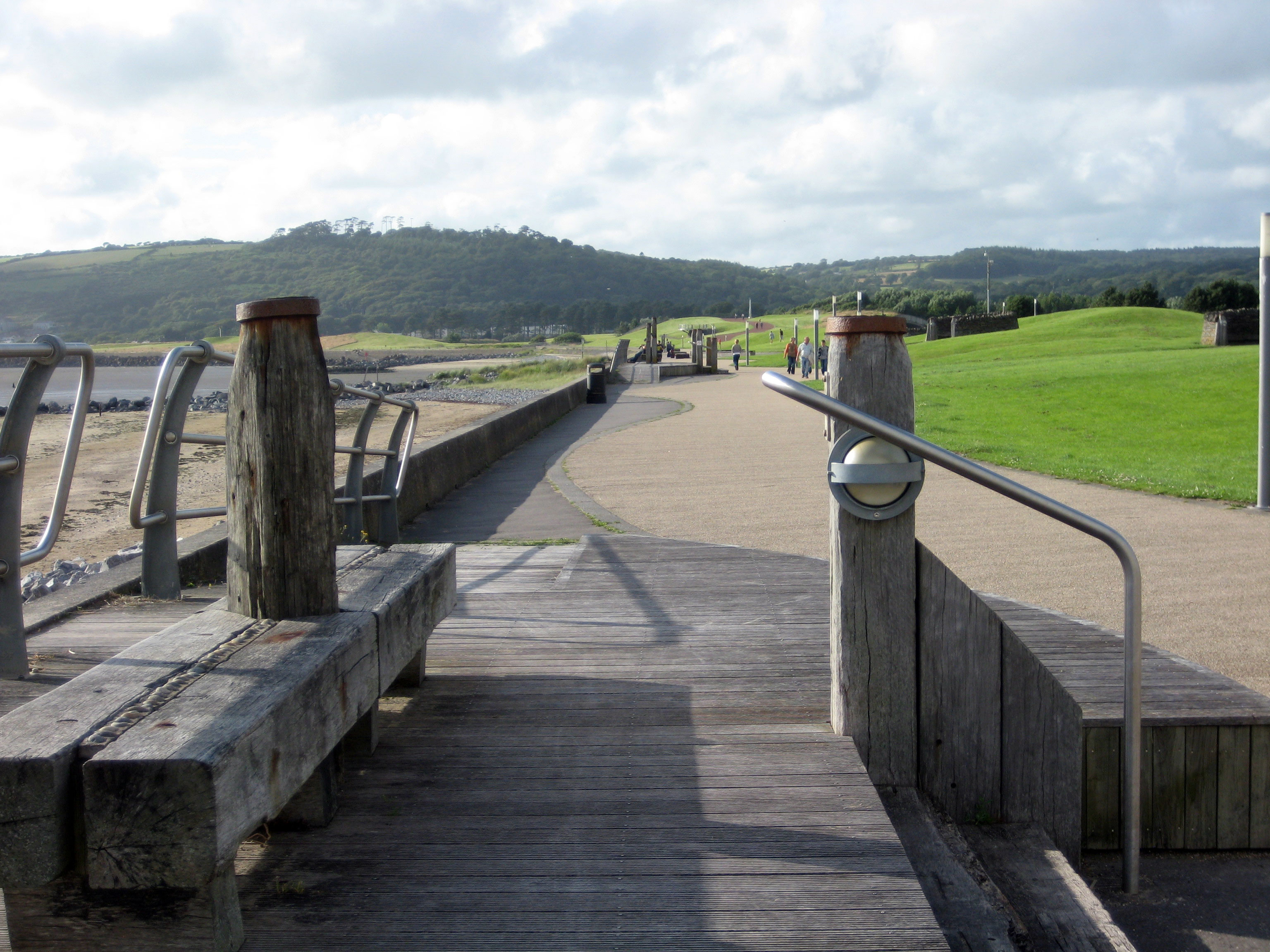
NCR 4 traverses the Millennium Coastal Path at Llanelli.

- Burry Port
- Pembrey
- Carmarthen
- Tenby
- Pembroke
- Haverfordwest
- St David's
- Fishguard

NCR 4 follows the Millennium Coastal Path along the south Carmarthenshire coast. Between Pembroke and Haverfordwest, NCR follows the route of a disused railway called the Brunel Trail and crosses over the Cleddau Bridge.

== See also ==
- National Cycle Network
- Sustrans
