= Millennium Coastal Path =

Walkway and cycleway in Carmarthenshire, Wales

Coordinates: 51.6844°N 4.1985°W

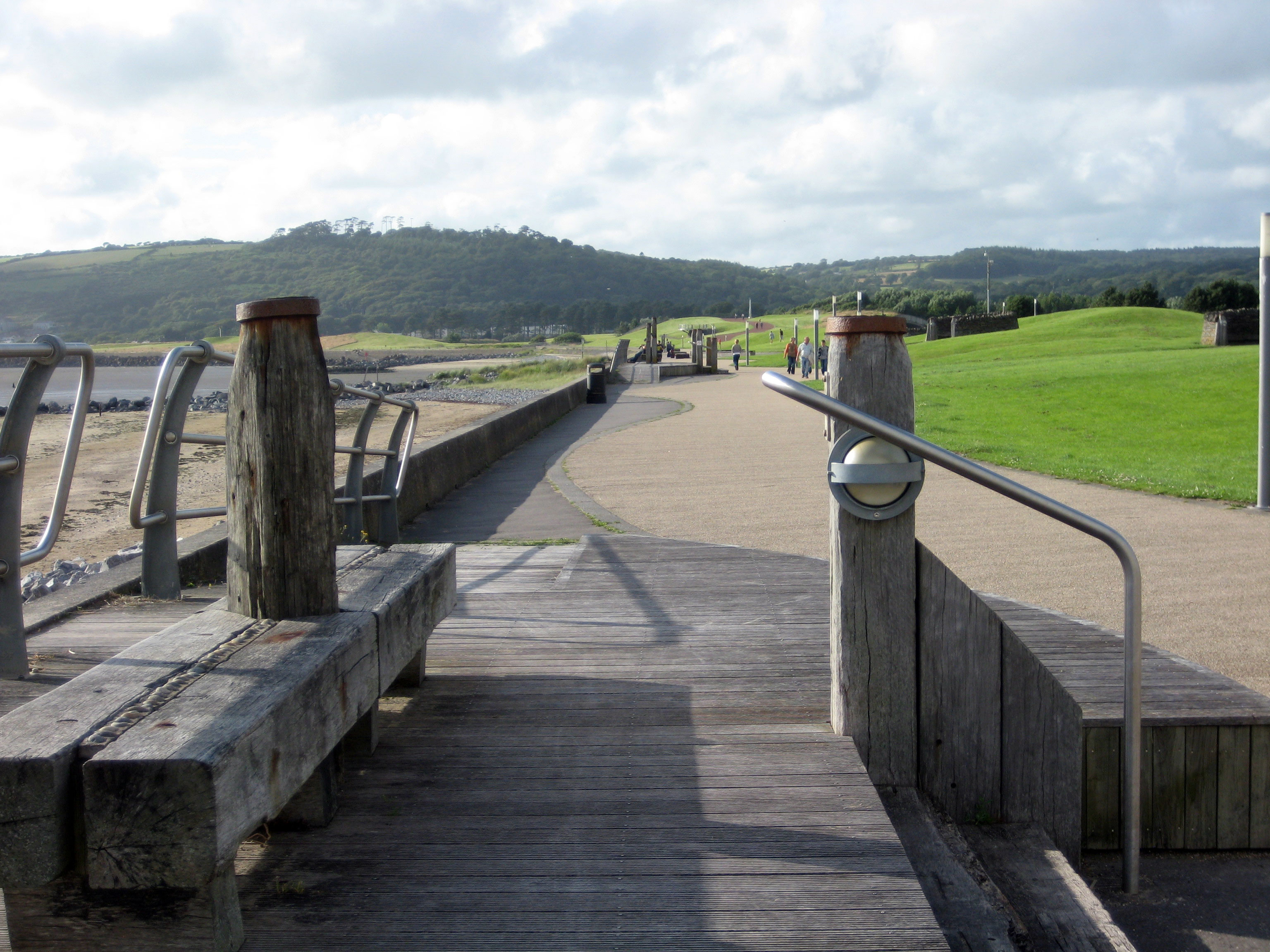
The Millennium Coastal Path at Llanelli.

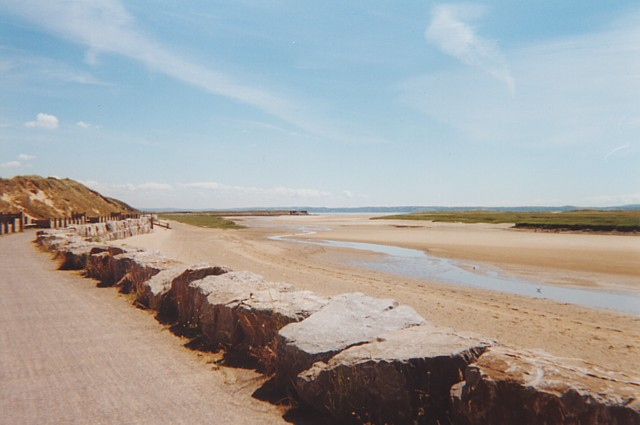
The Millennium Coastal Path at Pembrey.

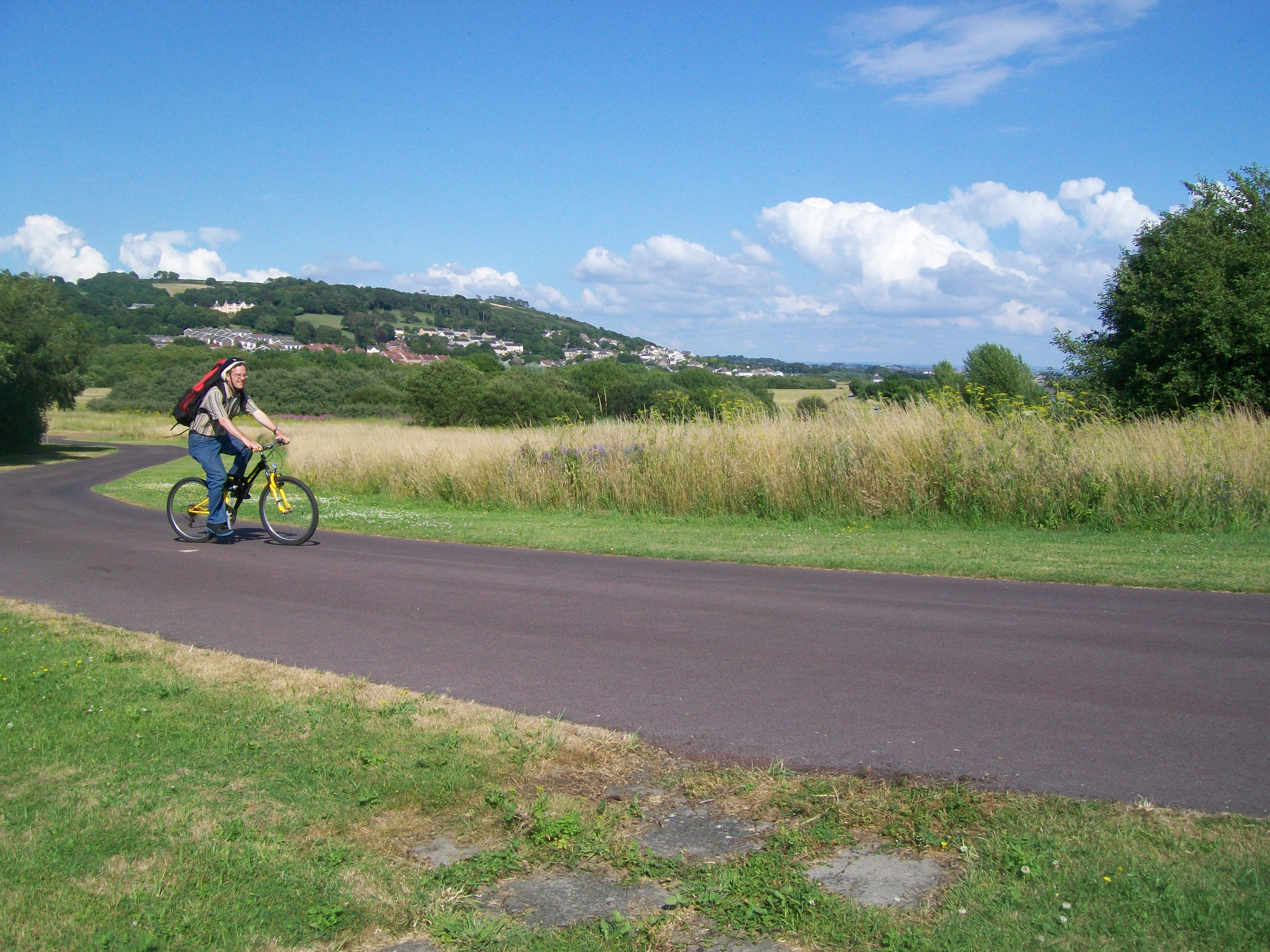
Millennium Coastal Path near Llanelli

The Millennium Coastal Path is a 13 miles (21 km) pedestrian walkway and cycleway along the south coast of Carmarthenshire, providing a link between Llanelli and Pembrey Country Park. The cycleway forms a section of both the Celtic Trail cycle route (part of NCN 47) and the National Cycle Network NCN 4.

The Millennium Coastal Path runs through the Millennium Coastal Park. More than 2,000 acres (8.1 km^{2}) of industrial wasteland was remediated to construct the park, along 14 miles (23 km) of coastline. The Millennium Coastal Path may refer specifically to the 7 miles (11 km) cycle and walking path from The Llanelli Discovery Centre to Burry Port and Pembury Forest, and more generally to the 10 miles (16 km) section of the Wales Coast Path through the park from Bynea Gateway to Burry Port.

On the evening of Monday 19 February 2007, a high tide combined with a high storm swell caused severe damage to a section of the path and cycle route near Burry Port. A 440 yards section was damaged with complete loss of a 160 yards section.
