= Great Flat Lode =

Mineral-bearing body of rock in west Cornwall, England

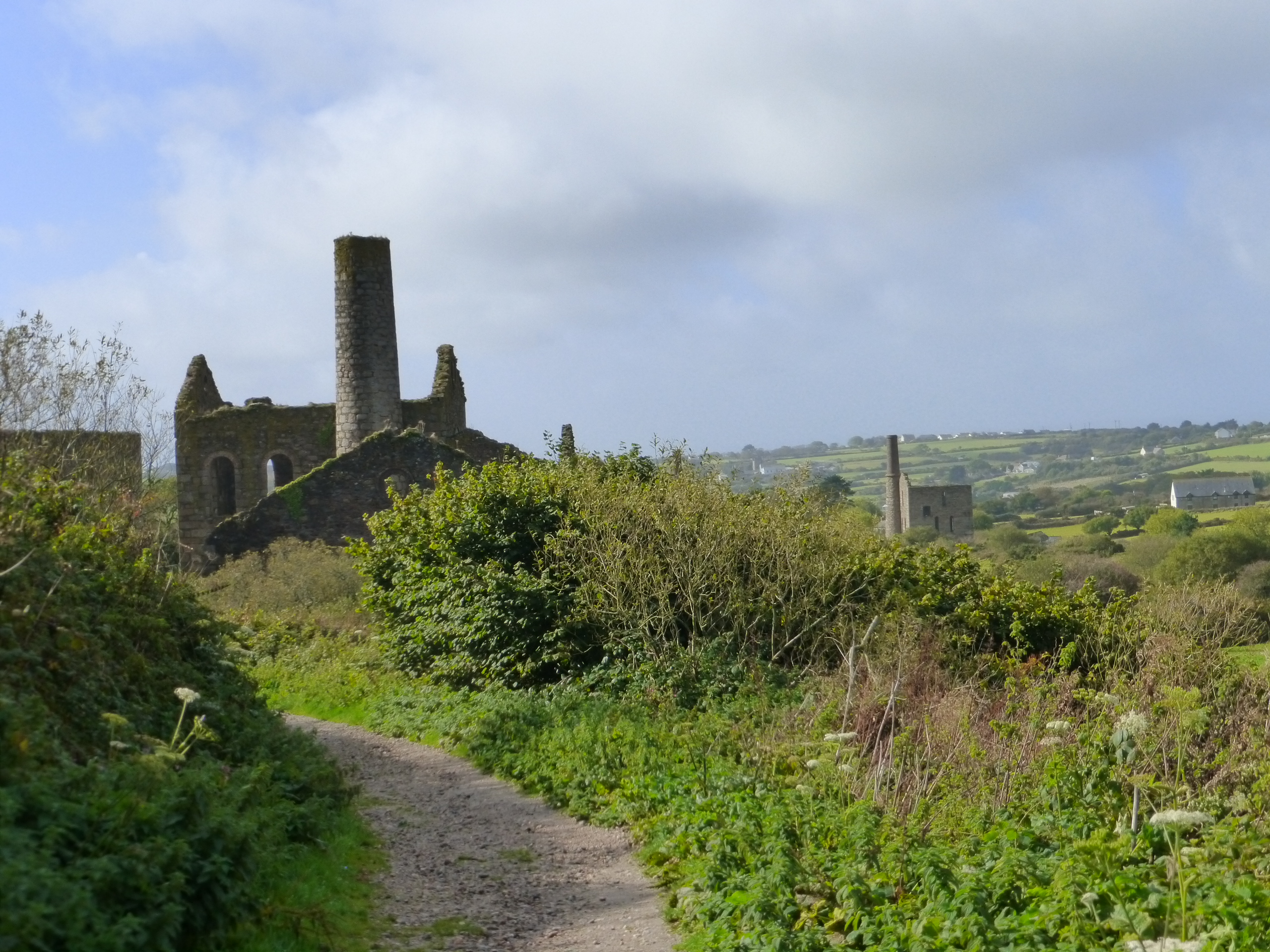
Ruined engine houses on the Great Flat Lode

The Great Flat Lode is a mineral-bearing body of rock under the southern granite slopes of Carn Brea south of Camborne in west Cornwall, UK.

== Mining ==
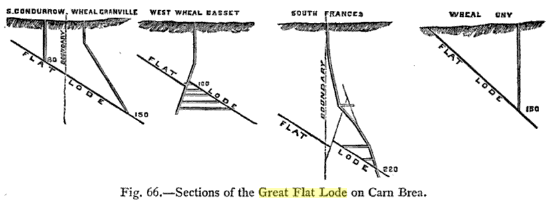
Sections through the Great Flat Lode at South Condurrow/Wheal Granville, West Wheal Basset, South Wheal Frances and Wheal Uny

The Great Flat Lode lies under the southern granite slopes of Carn Brea and so named because the tin-bearing rock was at an unusually shallow gradient of about 10 degrees to the horizontal. In other parts of Cornwall mineral bearing lodes lie at between 60 and 90 degrees to the horizontal. "Lode" is a mining term for a mineral vein. Its small gradient allowed for optimal location of the mines. The minerals were accessed by the South Condurrow Mine (later renamed King Edward Mine and used by the Camborne School of Mines), Wheal Grenville, South Wheal Frances Mine and the Bassett Mines. The mines were started to obtain copper ore but at greater depths tin was obtained.

Many of the mines amalgamated and continued production until the First World War.

== Trail ==
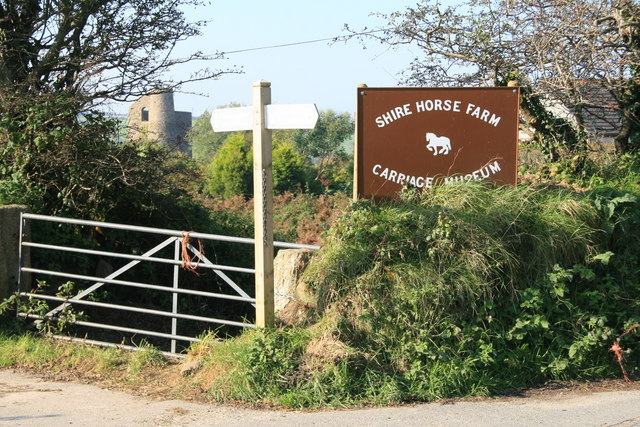
Gateway on the Great Flat Lode Trail

The Great Flat Lode Trail, a 12 km (7.5 mi) long circular trail around |Carn Brea 50.22179°N 5.24673°W is one of Cornwall's Mineral Tramway Trails.
