= Clay Trails =

Bicycle trails in Cornwall, England

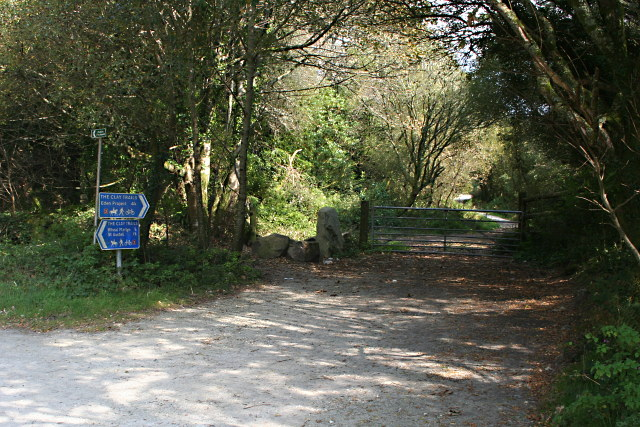
A path on the Clay Trails

The Clay Trails are a series of bicycle trails located in mid Cornwall, England, United Kingdom. The trails pass through the St Austell moorland which for over two centuries has been extensively quarried for china clay, hence the name.

The trails are separated into several routes.

== The Wheal Martyn trail - 8Km ==
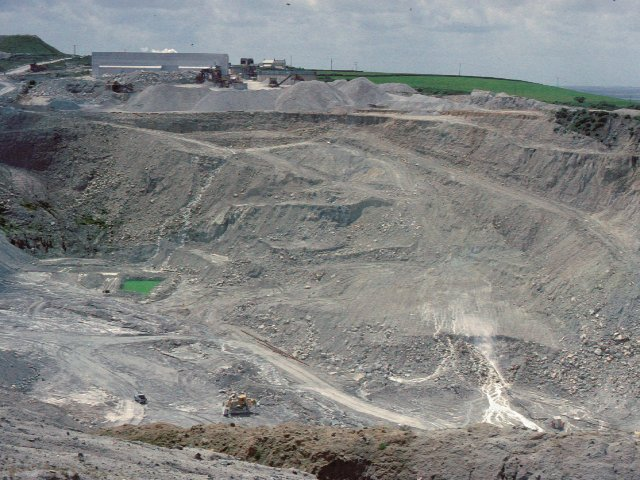
The Wheal Martyn clay pit

This trail connects the Eden project 50.361°N 4.745°W to the Wheal Martyn China Clay museum. This also incorporates a short section of trail called the sky spur trail. The trail has views of several disused china clay pits with white walls and turquoise water. A feature of the trail is the white pyramid, although it's now green, which is a disused china clay tip in which the waste sand has been tipped to form a conical hill. The trail then drops into the Trenance valley where it crosses its award-winning William Cookworthy bridge. Here it joins the Lansalson branch line and is joined by the St Austell trail. A further kilometre through this historic valley is the Wheal Martyn China clay museum.

== The St Austell trail - 2.5Km ==
This connects the town of St Austell 50.338°N 4.793°W to the Wheal Martyn trail, this section follows the route of the disused Lansalson branch line along the Trenance valley and on its route passes several historical sites. At the beginning of the trail, views of the curved viaduct carrying the Cornish main line railway can be seen. A kilometre from the entrance to the trail is the disused Carlyon Farm china clay dries which are the largest of their type in Europe.

== The Bugle trail - 6Km ==
This connects the village of Bugle 50.395°N 4.793°W to the Eden project.

== The St Blazey trail - 5Km ==
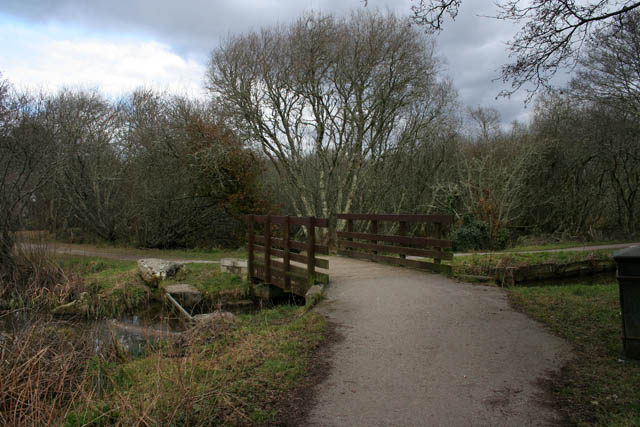
The Clay Trail near St Blazey

This connects the Eden Project to Par beach via St Blazey 50.362°N 4.717°W.

== See also ==
- Sustrans a charity promoting sustainable transport in the UK, which part-funded the Clay Trails.
- National Cycle Network
