= Celtic Trail cycle route =

Cycle route in Wales

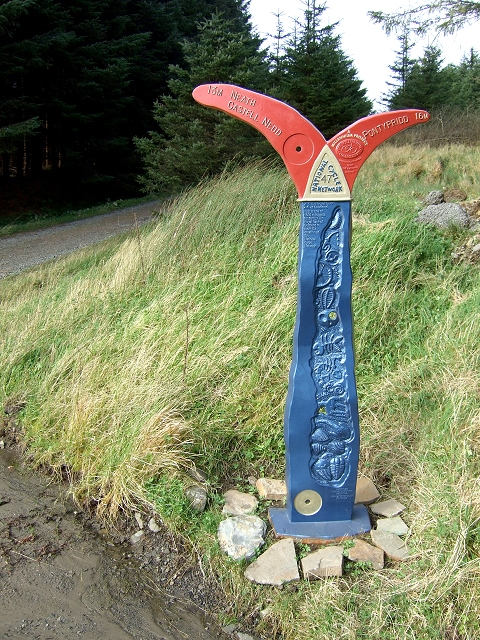
Marker on the Celtic Trail cycle route (National Cycle Network 47)

The Celtic Trail is a network of dedicated cycle routes in the National Cycle Network, crossing West, South and Mid Wales, and covering 377 miles in total. It is divided into east and west sections. The west section links Pembroke and Fishguard on the west coast to Swansea, and the east section covers the area from Swansea to Chepstow, Abergavenny and Hay-on-Wye in the east. It is largely traffic free but sections along the route are still being upgraded and improved. In some places there is a choice of a low-level route, or a high-level route for mountain bikes.

The network includes Route 42 (Glasbury, Mid Wales to Gloucester, England), Route 43 (Swansea to Builth Wells), Route 46 (Hereford to Newport), Route 47 (Newport to Fishguard), Route 49 (Abergavenny to Newport), and 492 (Cwmbran to Brynmawr), the Welsh section of Route 4 (London to Fishguard), a large part of Route 8 (Lon las Cymru, Cardiff to Holyhead), and other short links.

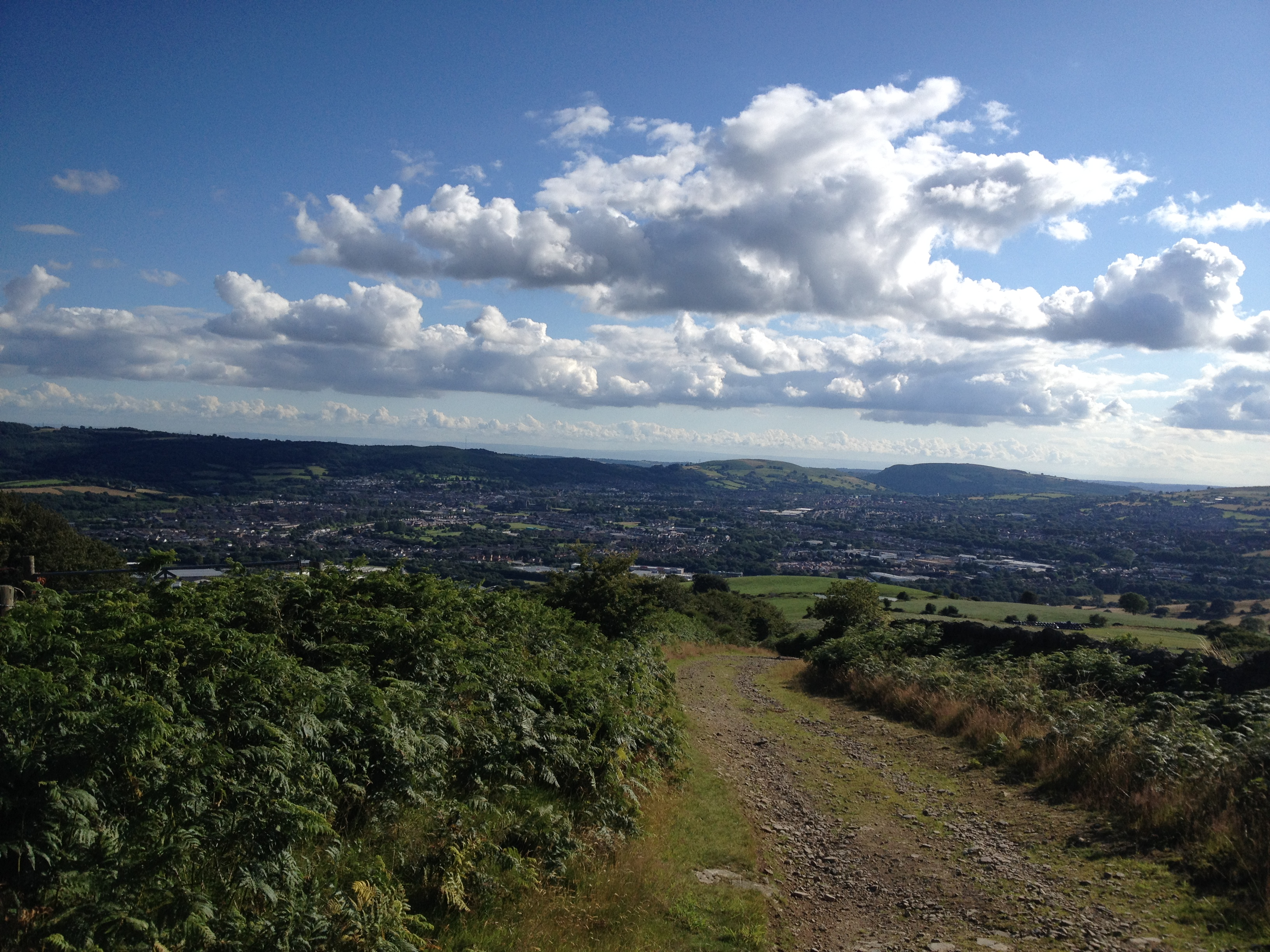
A view of Bedwas and Caerphilly from a side path through Ynys Hywel Activity Centre, which diverts from the main NCN 47 just before Cwmfelinfach.

Places along Route 47 (from west to east) include:

- Fishguard51.993°N 4.975°W
- Pembrokeshire Coast National Park
- National Botanic Garden of Wales
- Carmarthen
- Pembrey Country Park (Millennium Coastal Path)
- Llanelli
- Swansea
- Neath
- Pontypridd
- Merthyr Tydfil
- Caerphilly
- Newport
- Chepstow
- Severn Bridge51.609°N 2.639°W
