= Mineral Tramway Trails =

Public leisure trails in west Cornwall

A modern waymarker on the Coast to Coast Trail near Twelveheads

The Mineral Tramways Trails are a series of public leisure trails located in mid west Cornwall. The network comprises over 60 kilometres (37 mi) of trails, which largely follow the routes of former tram and railway lines for transporting goods and materials to and from the many copper and tin mines which historically operated in the region.

== Development of the trails ==
The Mineral Tramways Heritage Project was set up by Cornwall County Council in 1989. It received funding from the National Lottery Heritage Fund in 2003, as well as EU Objective One regeneration funding, South West Regional Development Agency funding, as well as funding from Cornwall and Kerrier councils.

== List of trails ==
The trails are as follows:

Name	Length	Description	Connections
Coast to Coast Trail	11 mi (18 km)	From the north coast, the trail follows the route of the Portreath Tramway. The southern section of the trail includes the mines at Gwennap, following the Redruth & Chasewater Railway route to Devoran on the Carrick Roads estuary.	Tolgus Trail, Redruth & Chasewater Trail, Portreath Branchline Trail, as well as the Wheal Busy Loop
Redruth and Chacewater Railway Trail	7.7 mi (12.4 km)	Runs largely along the route of the original Redruth and Chacewater Railway, passing through woodland, moorland, and lookout points.	Great Flat Lode Trail, Tresavean Trail, Coast to Coast Trail
Great Flat Lode Trail	7.5 mi (12.1 km)	A circular trail following part of the route of the Basset Mine Tramroad through farmland, heathlands and historic former mining sites.	Portreath Branch Line Trail, Redruth & Chasewater Railway Trail
Tehidy Trail	2.5 mi (4.0 km)	The trail runs through Tehidy Country Park.	Portreath Branchline Trail, Coast to Coast Trail
Tresavean Trail	1.1 mi (1.8 km)	A trail following the former Tresavean branch of the Hayle Railway. The trail is mostly level and off-road.	Redruth & Chasewater Railway Trail
Portreath Branchline Trail	5.5 mi (8.9 km)	A trail following much of the route of the former Portreath branch of the Hayle Railway.	Coast to Coast Trail, Tehidy Trail, Great Flat Lode Trail
Tolgus Trail	0.8 mi (1.3 km)	Connects Tolgus Mount with the Coast to Coast Trail, following the floor of the Portreath Valley, an area historically significant for tin mining. There are plans to extend the trail to Redruth railway station.	Coast to Coast Trail

== See also ==
- Cornwall and West Devon Mining Landscape UNESCO World Heritage Site
- British quarrying and mining narrow-gauge railways
- Rail trail
- Cornish Way - a cycle route which links to the Mineral Tramway Trails

== Bibliography ==
- Acton, Bob - Exploring Cornwall's Tramway Trails, vol. 1: Great Flat Lode Trail, 1996, reprinted 2001, ISBN 978-1-873443-41-5
- Acton, Bob - Exploring Cornwall's Tramway Trails, vol. 2: Coast-to-coast Trail - Portreath to Devoran and Beyond, 1997, reprinted 2000, ISBN 978-1-873443-37-8
