= National Cycle Route 8 =

Route of the National Cycle Network in Wales

Coordinates: 53.309°N 4.633°W

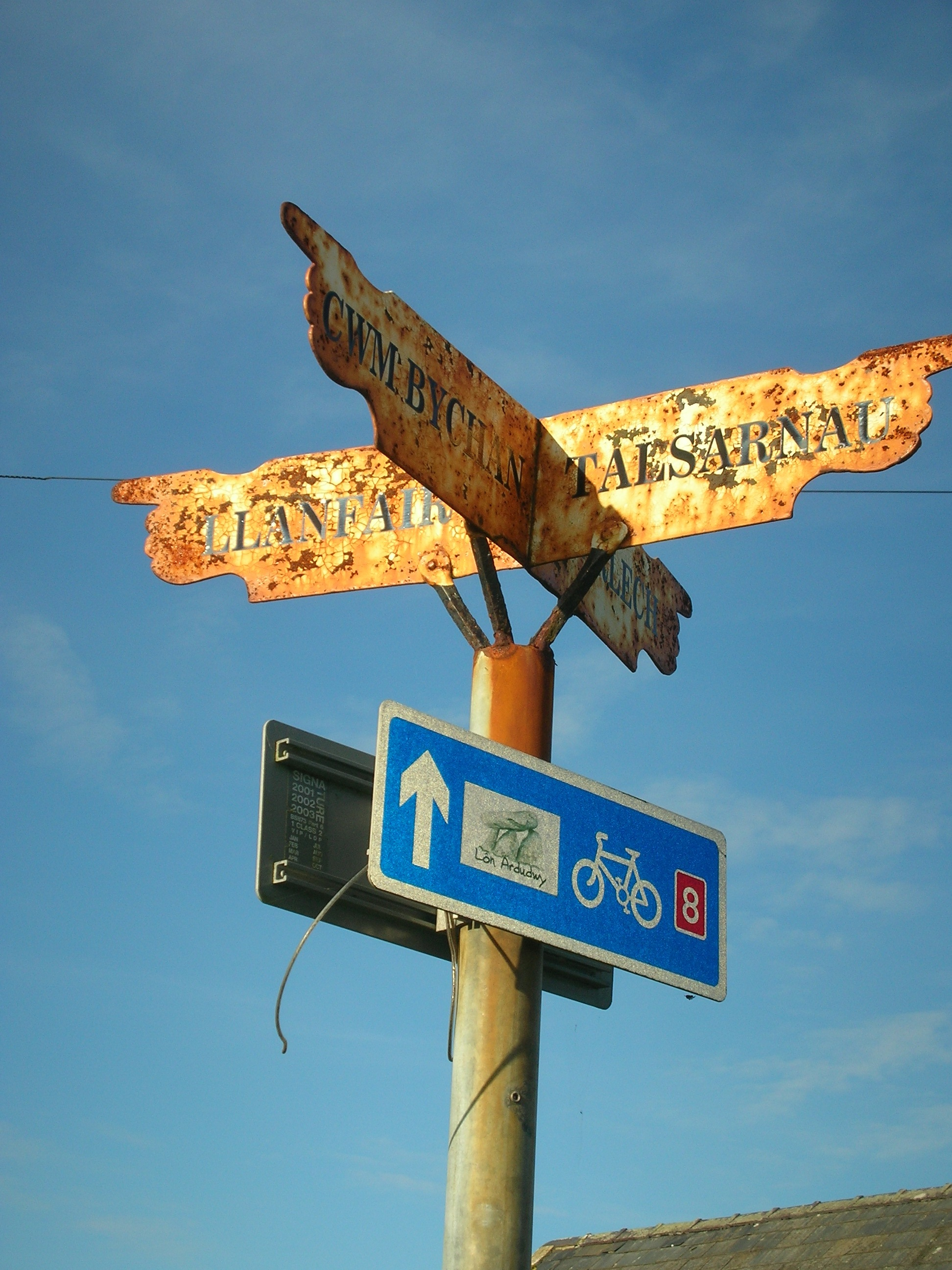
Route 8 sign near Harlech, North Wales

National Cycle Route 8 (or NCR 8) is a route of the United Kingdom National Cycle Network, running from Cardiff to Holyhead. The route passes through the heart of Wales, and is also known as Lôn Las Cymru (Welsh for 'Wales' green lane'). It is largely north–south from Holyhead to Cardiff or Chepstow, and in total measures some 400 km (250 mi) in length. Some of its route follows the trackbed of former railway lines, such as Lôn Las Menai, Lôn Eifion, the Mawddach Trail and the Taff Trail; in other places, the route is on public highways.

Both ends are easily accessible via the rail network.

== Route ==
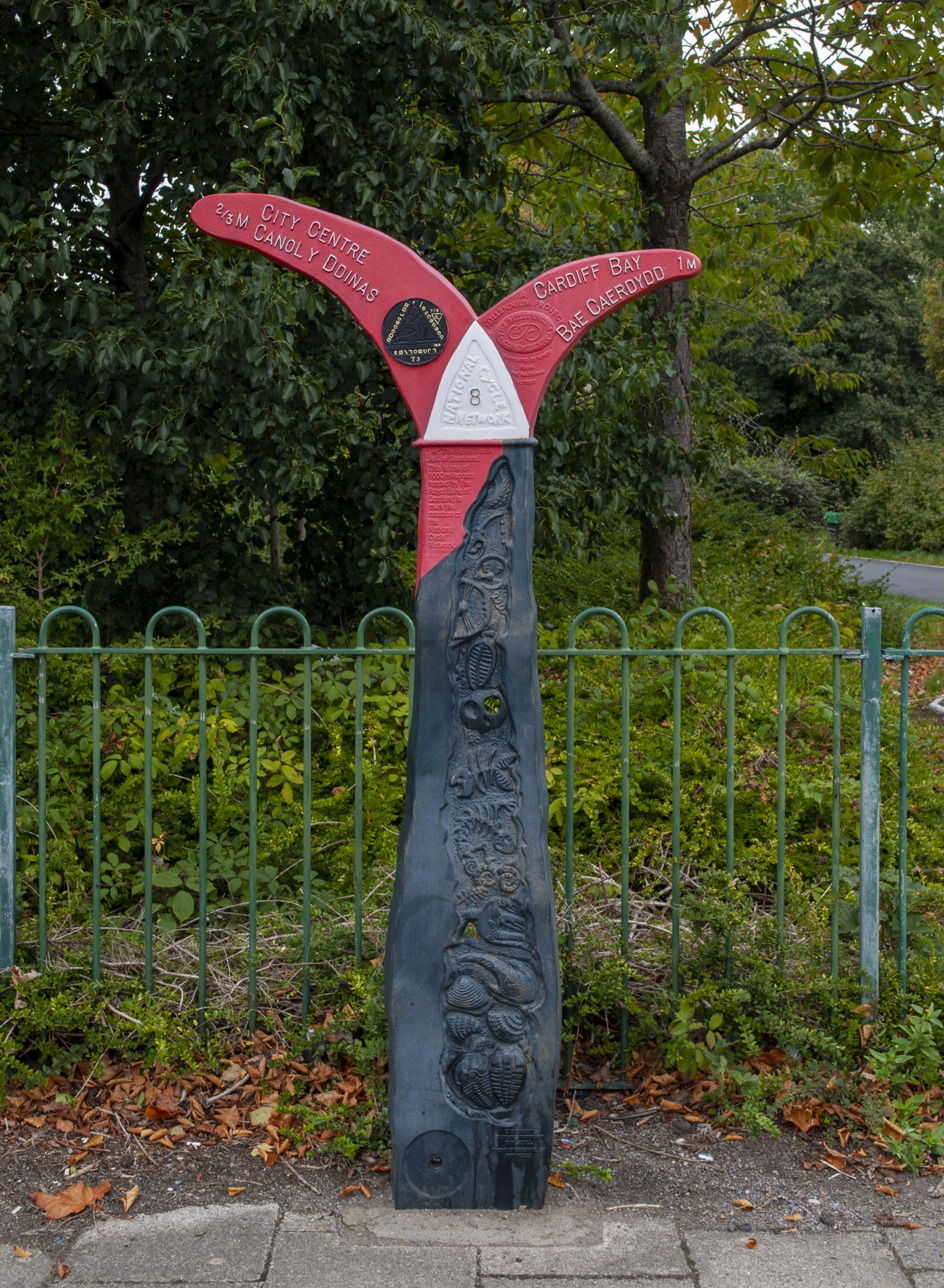
Cast iron Millennium Milepost, Lloyd George Avenue, Cardiff

=== Cardiff to Brecon ===
This largely follows the Taff Trail:

Cardiff | Pontypridd | Abercynon | Merthyr Tydfil | Brecon

=== Alternative: Chepstow to Glasbury ===
Lon Las Cymru provides an alternative south route for those coming into Wales from the Severn Bridge, following Route 42 from Chepstow to Glasbury, where it joins Route 8:

Chepstow | Usk | Abergavenny | Glasbury

There is also a small loop at the top of Route 42 providing links to Hay-on-Wye.

=== Brecon to Machynlleth ===
Brecon | Talgarth | Glasbury | Erwood | Builth Wells | Newbridge on Wye | Llanwrthwl | Rhayader | Llangurig | Llanidloes | Staylittle | Machynlleth

=== Machynlleth to Porthmadog ===
Machynlleth | Dolgellau | Trawsfynydd | Penrhyndeudraeth | Porthmadog

=== Porthmadog to Holyhead ===
Porthmadog | Penygroes | Caernarfon | Bangor | Holyhead
