= National Cycle Network =

Bicycling route network in the UK

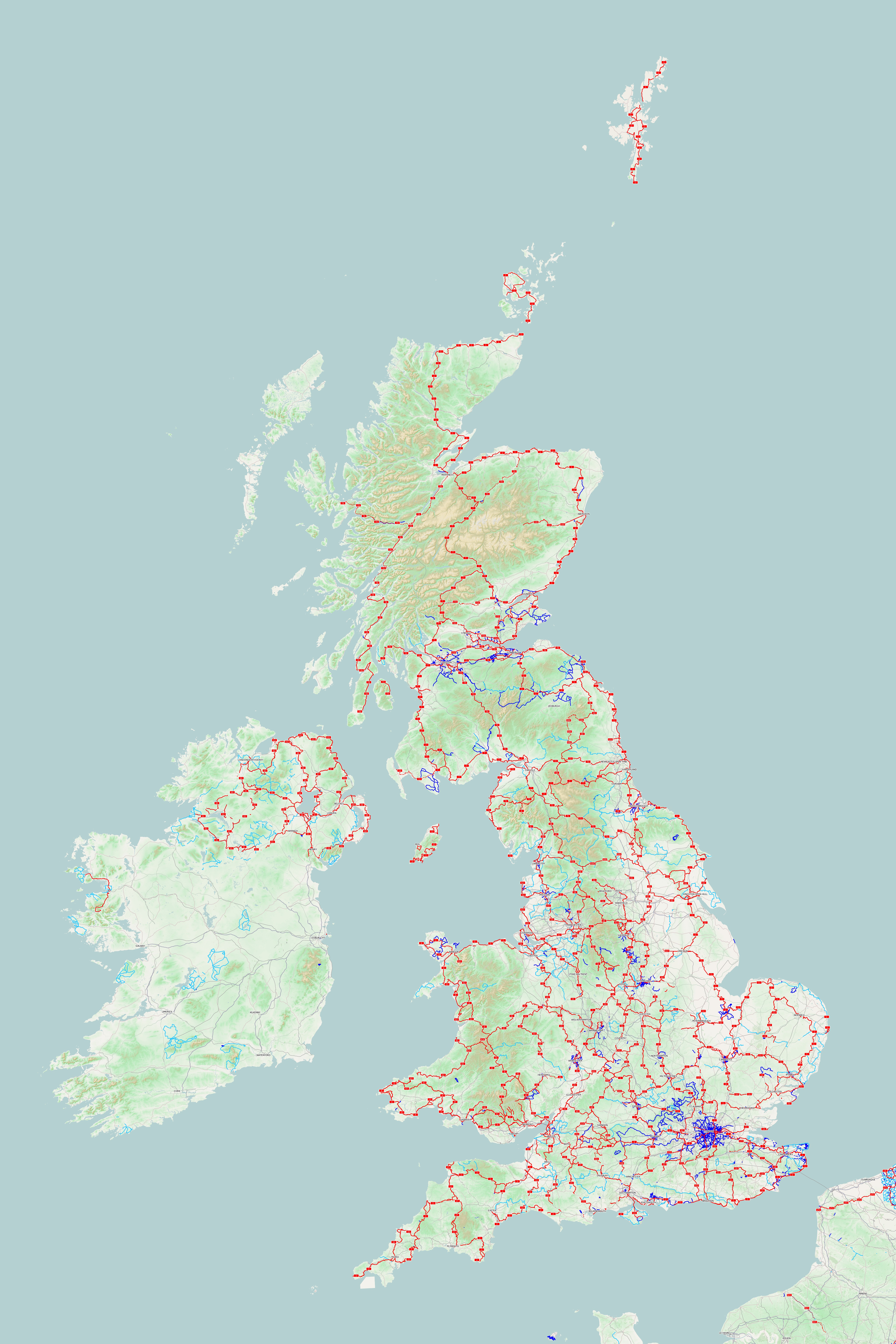
The NCN on OpenStreetMap

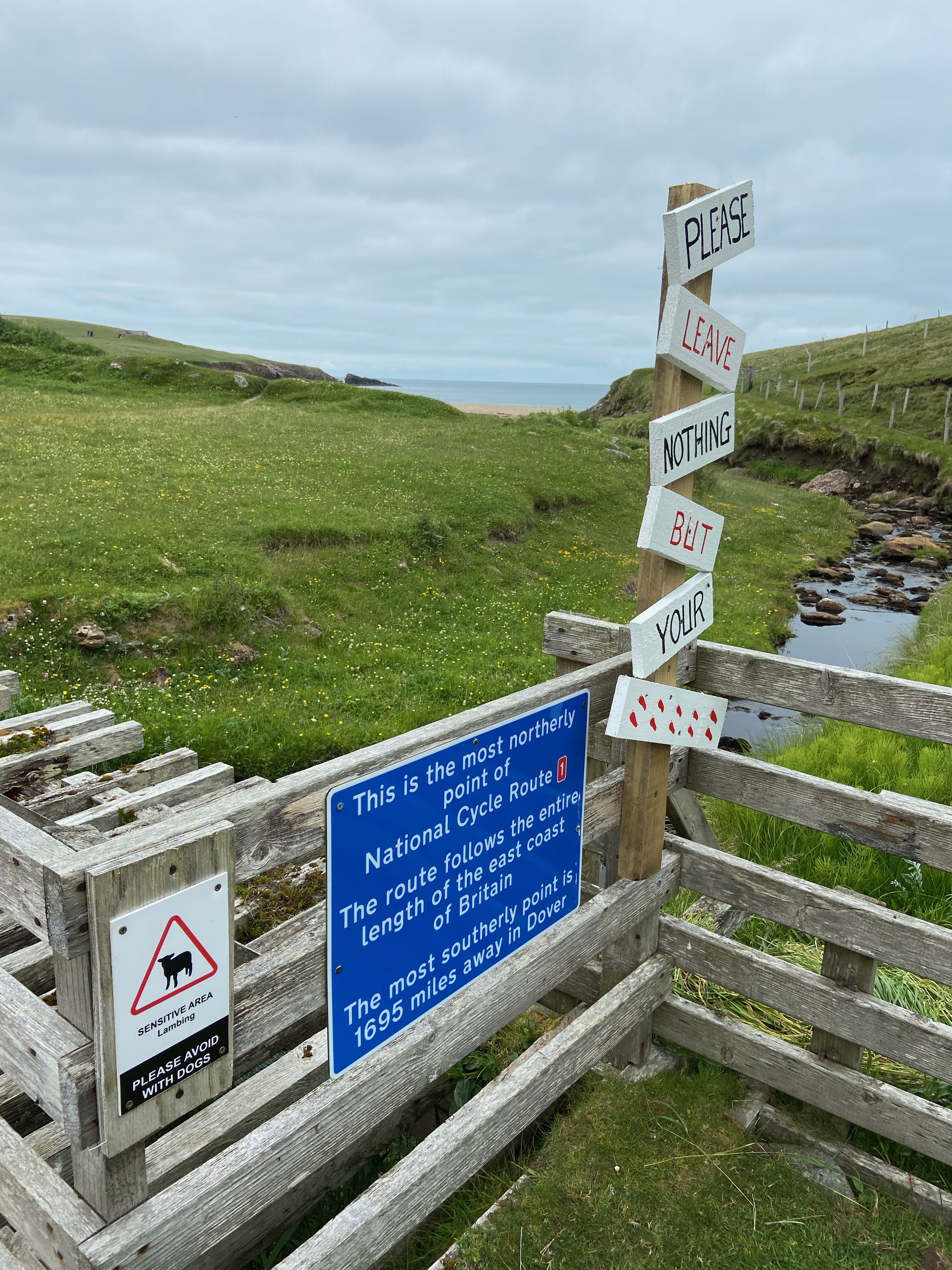
Former northern end of National Cycle Route 1, in Haroldswick, Shetland. This route was de-designated on safety grounds in 2020.

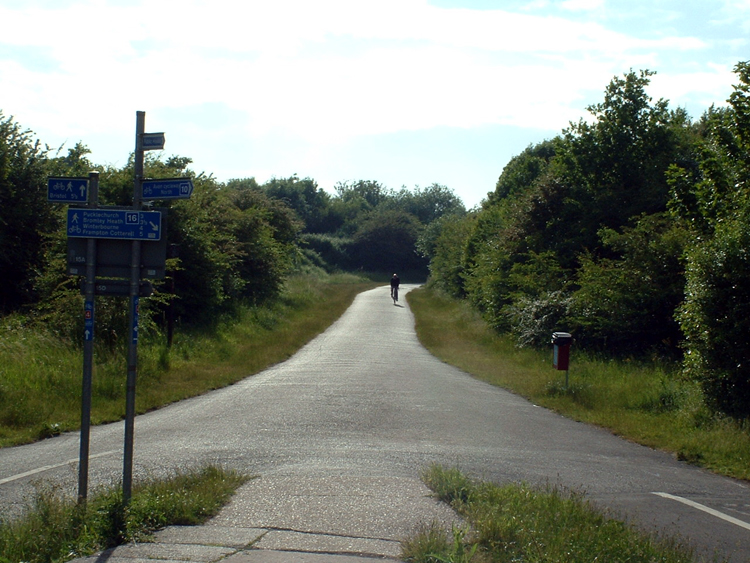
The first section of the NCN to be built was the Bristol & Bath Railway Path, opened in 1984

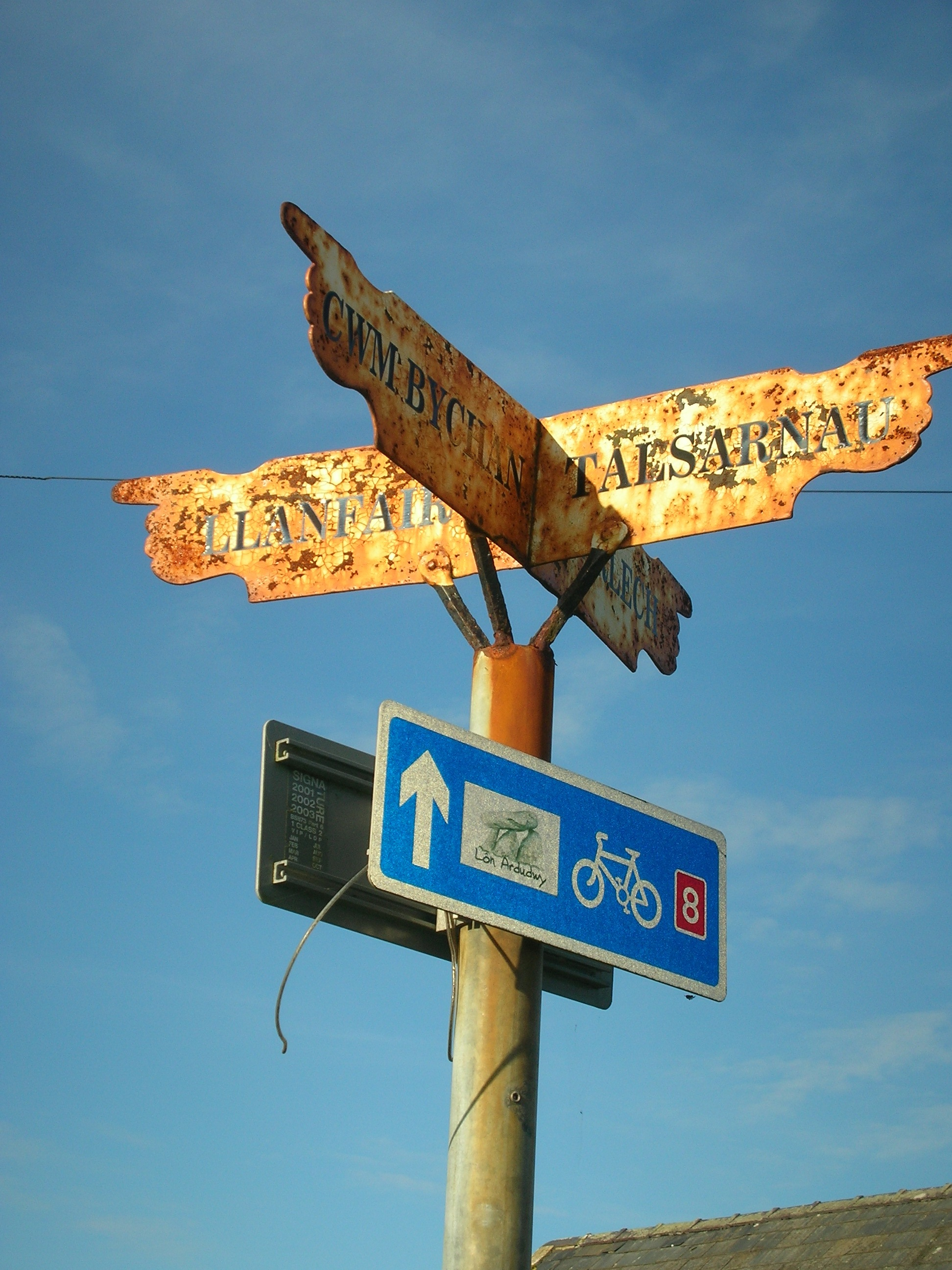
Route 8 sign near Harlech, North Wales

The National Cycle Network (NCN) is a cycling network covering the entire United Kingdom. It was established to encourage cycling and walking throughout the United Kingdom, as well as for the purposes of bicycle touring. It was created by the charity Sustrans who were aided by a £42.5 million National Lottery grant.

However, Sustrans themselves only own around 2% of the paths on the network, the rest being made of existing public highways and rights of way, and permissive paths negotiated by Sustrans with private landowners.

In 2017, the Network was used for over 786 million cycling and walking trips, made by 4.4 million people.

In 2020, around a quarter of the NCN was scrapped on safety grounds, leaving 12,739 miles (20,501 km) of signed routes. These are made up of 5,220 miles (8,400 km) of traffic-free paths with the remaining 7,519 miles (12,101 km) on-road. It uses shared use paths, disused railways, minor roads, canal towpaths and traffic-calmed routes in towns and cities.

== History ==
The Bristol and Bath Railway Path (now part of National Route 4) is a 14-mile (23 km) walking and cycling path on a disused railway. It opened in 1984 and was the first part of what would later become the NCN.

The National Cycle Network began with a National Lottery Grant from the Millennium Commission in 1995. The original goal was to create 5,000 miles (8,000 km) of signposted cycle routes by 2005, with 50% of these not being on roads, and all of it being "suitable for an unsupervised twelve year old." By mid-2000, 5,000 miles (8,000 km) of route was signposted to an "interim" standard, and a new goal was then set to double that to 10,000 miles (16,000 km) by 2005. August 2005 saw the completion of that goal.

In 2018, Sustrans published the National Cycle Network - Paths for Everyone report which reviewed the quality and usage of the Network and set out a vision for its future. The report rated 42% of the then network as 'very poor' and identified over 12,000 barriers on the network which made it inaccessible by some users. As a result, around a quarter of the network was de-designated.

As of July 2020, there were 12,739 miles (20,501 km) of signed cycle and walking routes that are part of the Network.

== Routes ==
=== National routes ===
There are ten main national routes. As of 2020 they are not all complete.

- National Cycle Route 1: Dover – Tain. Running the length of the east coast and passing through London and Edinburgh.
- National Cycle Route 2: Dover – St Austell in England, along the south coast.
- National Cycle Route 3: Bristol – Land's End, incorporating the West Country Way via Chew Valley Lake, and the Cornish Way
- National Cycle Route 4: London (Greenwich) – Fishguard, in West Wales, via Reading, Bath, Bristol, Newport, Caerphilly, Pontypridd, Swansea and Llanelli.
- National Cycle Route 5: Reading – Holyhead, via Birmingham, The Midlands and the North Wales coast
- National Cycle Route 6: Windsor – Lake District, running in sections via Luton, Milton Keynes, Northampton, Derby, Nottingham, Sheffield, Manchester and Preston crossing the Pennine Cycleway
- National Cycle Route 7: Sunderland – Inverness via Glasgow.
- National Cycle Route 8: Cardiff – Holyhead, through the heart of Wales.
- National Cycle Route 9: Belfast – Newry in sections of traffic-free route, with the major sections being between Belfast and Lisburn, and Craigavon and Newry
- National Cycle Route 10: Tynemouth — Cockermouth. Roughly parallel to the C2C / Sea to Sea Cycle Route and Hadrian's Cycleway. It is a branch of National Route 1.

=== Numbering system ===
NCN routes beginning with numbers 1 to 6 are generally in England, routes beginning with a 7 start in Scotland and northern England, routes beginning with an 8 are generally in Wales, and routes beginning with a 9 are in Northern Ireland. The main route numbers have one digit (1 to 6 radiate clockwise from the south of England); other routes have two digits, starting with the number of the relevant main route.

There are also many shorter routes, reaching smaller towns and cities, that have three-digit numbers. Again, the route numbers start with the number of the main route for that region. For example, the Great North Cycleway in northern England has route number 725. Signs showed the route numbers on a blue background. Routes have been progressively renumbered with three-digit national numbers.

Some routes are numbered to match the motorways and major roads that connect the same destinations; examples include National Route 62, which by connecting the two sides of the Pennines mirrors the M62 motorway.

=== Signage ===
Direction sign for NCN Route 72, Hadrian's Cycleway.

The network is signposted using a white bicycle symbol (and on some routes, walking) on a blue background, with an inset box showing a white route number on a red background. In general, signs do not show destinations or distances. On some older signs, regional route numbers have a blue background instead. The system of symbols is based on that used by the Danish National Cycle Route network.

==== Mileposts ====
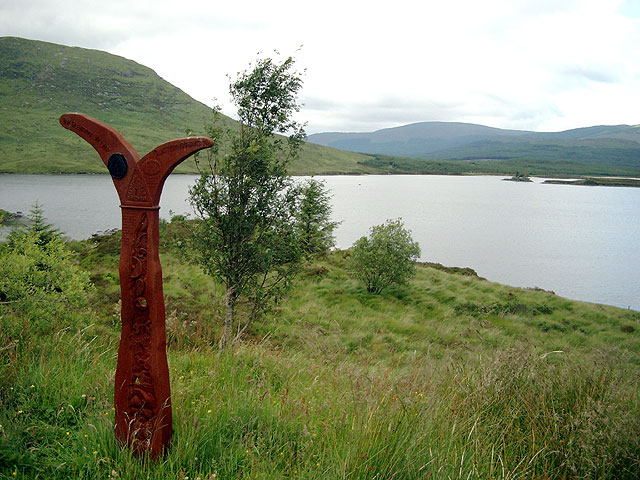
A NCN "Millennium Milepost"

One thousand "Millennium Mileposts" made from cast iron were funded by the Royal Bank of Scotland to mark the creation of the National Cycle Network, and these are found along the NCN routes throughout the UK. Following the de-designation of approximately a quarter of the NCN in 2020, a significant number of the mileposts are now orphaned from their intended routes.

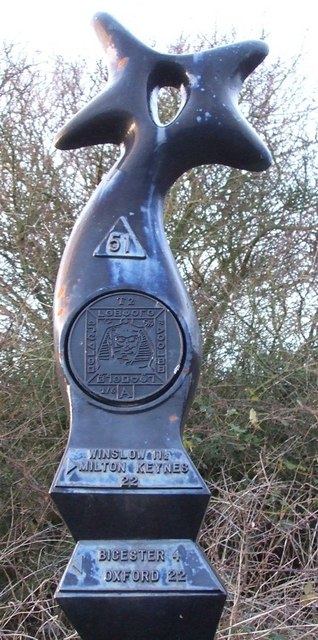
Millennium Milepost - Close-up (top) - geograph.org.uk - 303741

There are four different types: "Fossil Tree" (designed by John Mills), "The Cockerel" (designed by Iain McColl), "Rowe Type" (designed by Andrew Rowe), and "Tracks" (designed by David Dudgeon). The four artists are from each country of the UK, though all posts can be found in all four countries.

Most mileposts contain a disk featuring symbols and text in code. There are 60 different designs, spread across the country. They form part of the Millennium Time Trail, a treasure hunt puzzle created by Sustrans in 2001.

The Verse held within the coded text is:

MEASURE EVERY HEARTBEAT TO COUNT OUT OUR LIFE'S SCORE/

IS "TIME TO ESCAPE" MEANT TO FIRE OUR COMING AGE?/

LOCKED IN SEASONS' BARS SWINGS PENDULUM'S CEASELESS CLAW/

LUNGS NEVER FULL ENSNARE US IN TIME'S EIGHT PIECE CAGE/

ENTROPY'S AIM SHOOTS LEPTONS IN DANCING CYCLES OF LIGHT/

NATIONS REACH OUT IN HOPE ACROSS TIME ZONES AND LONG DEGREES/

NO CORNERS TO HIDE US, EARTH’S SHADE SPINS HOURLY ROUND TO NIGHT/

IN ALL MIND-STREAMS WE WADE, OUR WORLD-LINES WEAVE PAST TAPESTRIES/

UNCERTAIN DREAMS EVOLVE IN THE STRUGGLE FOR THE “WHY?”/

MUST IN ALL THESE TIDES OF FAITH, FLOW STILL SUCH WAVES OF FEARS?/

PLACE AND TIME TEMPT FATES, BUT ALL LIFE’S NATURE IS TO DIE/

OUR ERA, STARS, BOWS OUT, PLAYING ITS MUSICAL SPHERES/

EVERY GAINED UTOPIAN GOAL MAKES US MANIFOLD TIME’S TREASURE/

MAPPED OUT, AS ABOVE SO BELOW, NERGAL TICKS OFF TIME’S MEASURE///

== See also ==
- The National Byway, an alternative 4,500-mile (7,242 km) sign-posted cycle network around Britain
- List of routes in Zone 4 of the National Cycle Network
- List of routes in Zone 8 of the National Cycle Network
