= Cefn yr Ystrad =

Mountain (619m) in Powys, Wales

Coordinates: 51.81443°N 3.32730°W

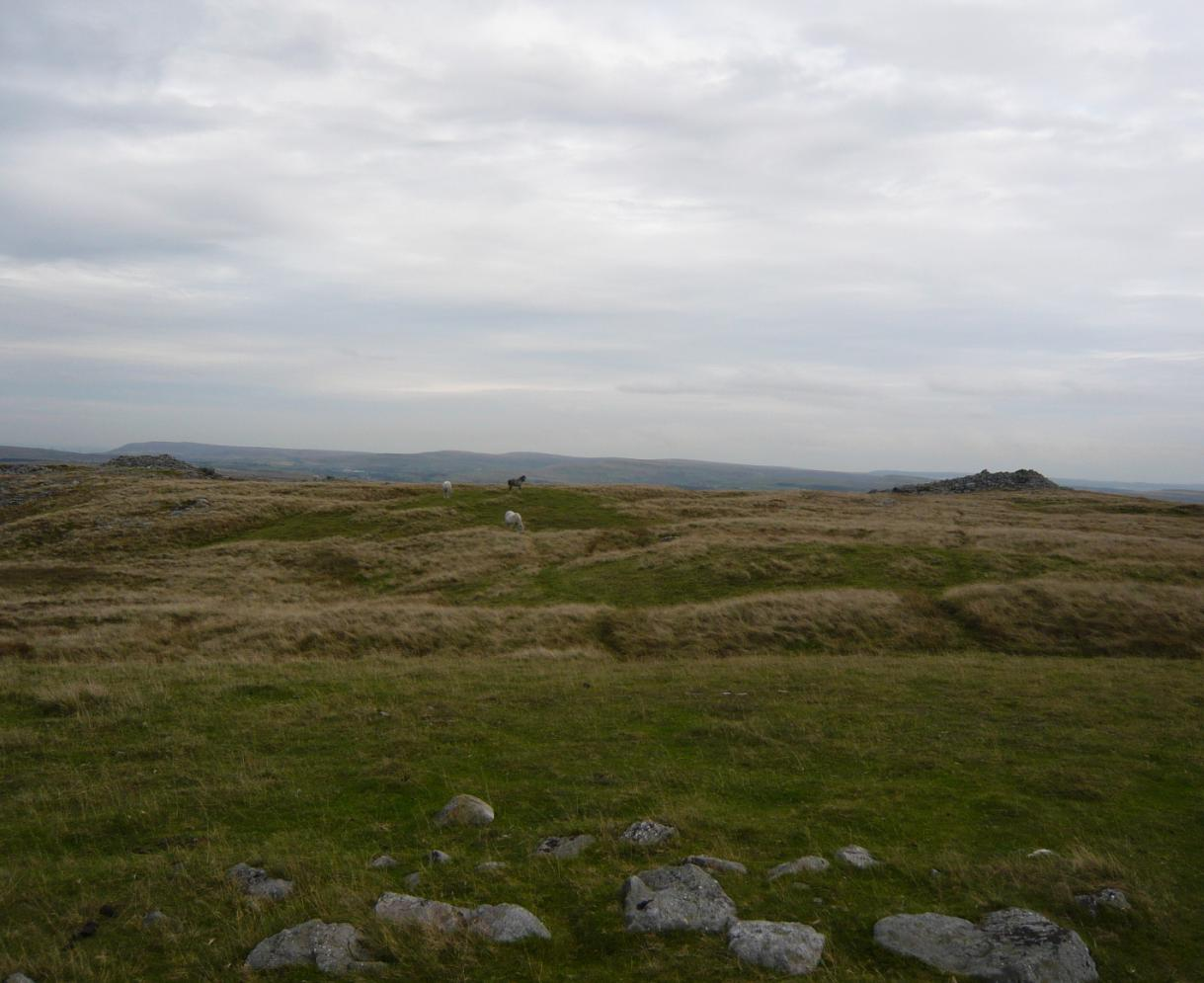
- The summit cairns of Cefn yr Ystrad

Highest point
- Elevation: 619 m (2,031 ft)
- Prominence: 180 m (590 ft)
- Parent peak: Pen y Fan
- Listing: Marilyn, Hewitt, Nuttall

Naming
- English translation: ridge of the valley
- Language of name: Welsh

Geography
- Location: Powys, Wales
- Parent range: Brecon Beacons
- OS grid: SO086137
- Topo map: OS Landranger 160

Cefn yr Ystrad (Welsh pronunciation: [kɛvn ər ˈəsdrad]) is a mountain in the Brecon Beacons National Park in Wales. It is an outlier of the Central Beacons group.

The broad northeast - southwest aligned ridge reaches an elevation of 619 metres (2,031 ft). One of the southernmost peaks in the Brecon Beacons, it rises to the east of Pontsticill Reservoir. The summit area is a great stretch of wild moorland, with the highest point marked by a trig point.

== Geology ==
The hill is formed from successive layers of Carboniferous Limestone and the overlying Twrch Sandstone (formerly known as the Basal Grit of the Millstone Grit). The rock strata generally dip to the south but are locally disrupted by foundering of the sandstone as the underlying limestone has dissolved away. There are extensive ice-smoothed pavements of the latter and loose rock abounds. The crest and southern slopes of the hill are home to dozens of shakeholes, some of which reach considerable proportions.

== Archaeology ==
The hill is scattered with archaeological sites from the Bronze Age through to the industrial period. Pre-eminent amongst these are Garn Felen and Carn-y-Bugail; the latter, which translates as ‘cairn of the shepherd’, is a 15m diameter burial cairn southeast of the summit. It stands at 3m high but has been partly disturbed. Numerous nineteenth century boundary stones can traced across the hill bearing the engraved letters ‘D of B, TM’ on the one side and ‘GH’ on the other, marking the boundary between the estates of the Duke of Beaufort, Tretower Manor and of the Gwynne Holford’s who were established at Buckland Hall near Bwlch

A number of more recent structures and tracks are associated with the now-abandoned limestone quarries of Cwar Blaen-dyffryn, Cwar y Hendre and Cwar yr Ystrad on the northern and northwestern flanks of the hill.

== Access ==
The hill lies entirely within open country and so access on foot is freely available. A bridleway running northeast from Pontsticill skirts the northwestern edge of the hill bound for Dyffryn Crawnon and the Usk Valley.
