= Dolygaer railway station =

Former railway station in Wales

Dolygaer
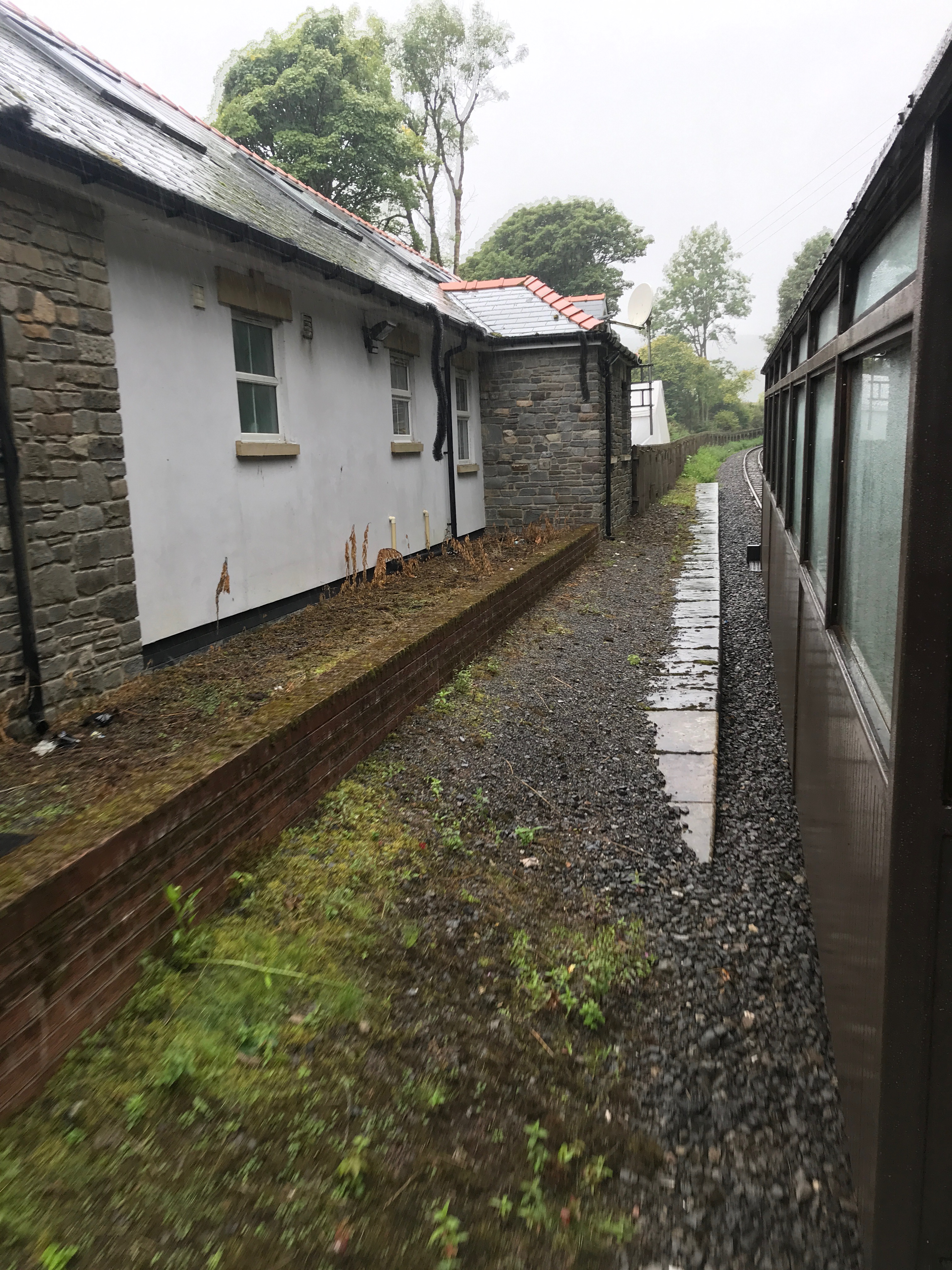

General information
- Location: Pontsticill Reservoir, Powys; Wales
- Coordinates: 51.8209°N 3.3685°W
- Grid reference: SO056145
- Operated by: Brecon Mountain Railway
- Platforms: 1

Other information
- Status: Disused

History
- Original company: Brecon and Merthyr Tydfil Junction Railway
- Pre-grouping: Brecon and Merthyr Tydfil Junction Railway
- Post-grouping: Great Western Railway

Key dates
- 19 March 1863: Opened
- 31 December 1962: Closed to passengers
- 4 May 1964: Closed for goods
Location

Dolygaer railway station (alternatively, Dol-y-gaer railway station) is a former station serving the hamlet of Dol-y-gaer and the area adjacent to Pen-twyn Reservoir (now incorporated into the Pontsticill Reservoir) in Powys, Wales.

== History ==
The station was opened on 19 March 1863 when the Brecon and Merthyr Tydfil Junction Railway commenced operations between Brecon Free Street and Pant. In 1866 the service through the station was 3 trains in each direction on weekdays only.

The line through Dolygaer station was single track, without passing facilities, and there was one platform with a single storey building. The station was staffed until 1932.

The line and station was closed to passengers on 31 December 1962 and to goods on 4 May 1964.

Dolygaer became a temporary terminus on the Brecon Mountain Railway (BMR) when the re-opened line was extended in 1995 to a new site south of the original station, with permanent way subsequently extended (by 2000) through the original station site also. This arrangement ceased in 2014 when the BMR further extended passenger services to Torpantau.

== Current use ==
The site of the station is today operated as the Plas Dolygaer Scout centre, with accommodation for Scout groups of up to 40 people. The centre incorporates the station platform, although this is now out of use.

The line through the station site was re-opened in 1995 by the Brecon Mountain Railway, a 1 ft 11 3/4 in (603 mm) tourist railway. A short platform has been constructed to narrow-gauge dimensions immediately beside the Plas Dolygaer Scout centre (on the original standard gauge dimension platform level), but the platform is unused, and the station remains closed to railway operations.

A short distance to the south of Dolygaer station, on the opposite side of the Nant Callan river, the railway company has installed the Dolygaer passing loop.

== Related attractions ==
The station has an adjacent cave, the Dolygaer Station Cave, or Ogof Dolygear, popular with cavers.

Preceding station	Disused railways	Following station
Torpantau; Line and station closed	Brecon and Merthyr Tydfil Junction Railway; Northern section	Pontsticill; Line and station closed

== Bibliography ==
- Bridge, Mike, ed. (2010). Railway Track Diagrams: Western (5th ed.). Trackmaps. ISBN 978-0-9549866-6-7.
- Page, James (1979). Forgotten Railways South Wales. David & Charles. ISBN 0-7153-7734-5.
- Quick, Michael (2022) [2001]. Railway passenger stations in Great Britain: a chronology (PDF). version 5.04. Railway & Canal Historical Society. Archived from the original (PDF) on 25 November 2022.
