= Pant railway station (Brecon and Merthyr Tydfil Junction Railway) =

Former railway station in Wales

General information
- Location: Pant, Merthyr Tydfil, Merthyr Tydfil; Wales
- Coordinates: 51.7782°N 3.3637°W
- Platforms: 3

Other information
- Status: Disused

History
- Original company: Brecon and Merthyr Tydfil Junction Railway
- Pre-grouping: Brecon and Merthyr Tydfil Junction Railway
- Post-grouping: Great Western Railway

Key dates
- 19 March 1863: Station opens
- 31 December 1962: Station closes to passengers
Location

Pant railway station (a.k.a. Pant Junction) was a station which served Pant, Merthyr Tydfil, in the historic Welsh county of Glamorgan, now Merthyr Tydfil County Borough. It was the junction at which the Brecon and Merthyr Tydfil Railway line from Pontsticill in the North split to serve the Dowlais Central and Dowlais Top lines. The line opened in 1859 and closed in 1964.

The station had 3 platforms serving the Up and Down services to Dowlais Top, and at a lower level a single platform to Dowlais Central. All 3 lines were single track beyond the station.

A new station (opened 1980) is the southern terminus of the Brecon Mountain Railway on an adjacent site.

== History ==
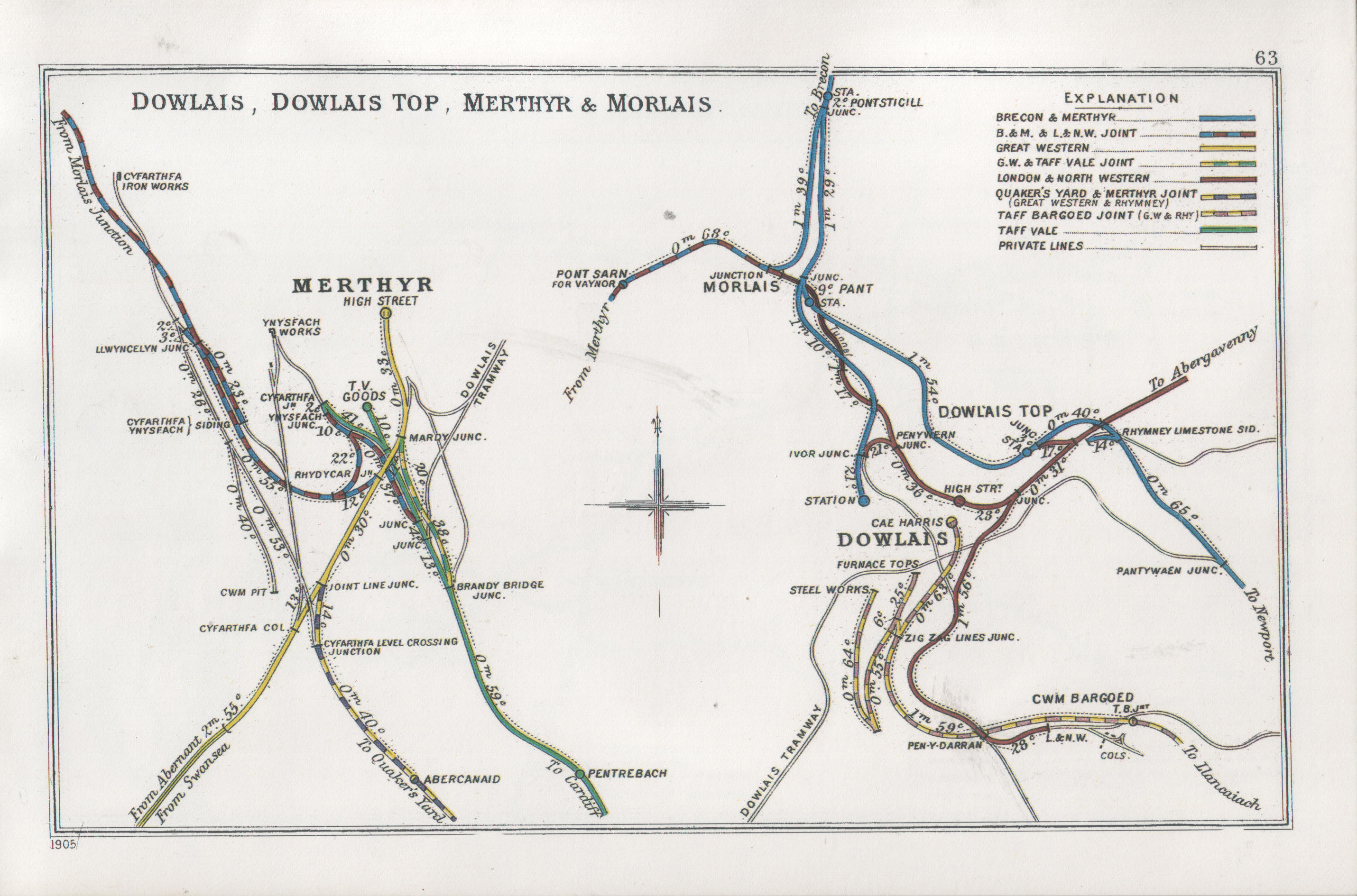
Railway line around Dowlais in 1905

The Brecon and Merthyr Tydfil Junction Railway obtained an Act of Parliament on 1 August 1859 to construct a line between Talybont and Pant. Train services between Brecon and Pant officially began on 23 April 1863 but two trains per day ran from 19 March 1863.

There was a fatal accident at Pant station on 22 August 1874.

It became part of the Great Western Railway during the Grouping of 1923.

== The site today ==
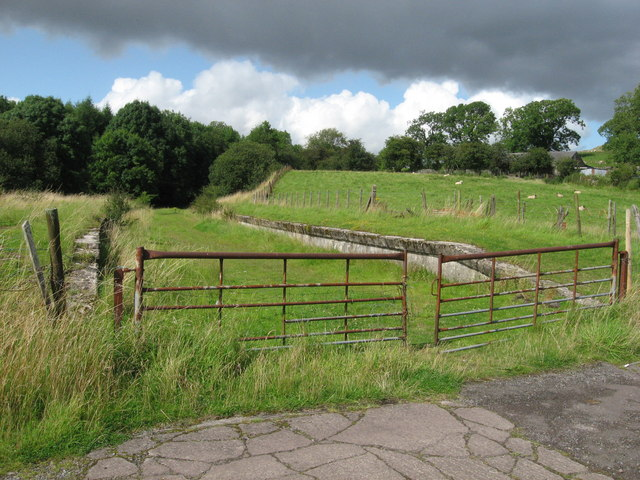
Remains of Pant station in 2009

The station site and trackbed was sold following closure, and today is disused. Two platform surfaces remain intact.

== Brecon Mountain Railway station ==
When the Brecon Mountain Railway sought to reopen the line, the original station site at Pant was no longer available, and an alternative location was established to the West. The new station is the southern terminus of the BMR that runs services 5 miles north to Torpantau.

Preceding station	Disused railways	Following station
Pontsticill; Line and station closed	Brecon and Merthyr Tydfil Junction Railway; Northern section	Dowlais Top; Line and station closed
Pontsticill; Line and station closed	Brecon and Merthyr Tydfil Junction Railway; Northern section	Pantysgallog (High Level) Halt; Line and station closed
