= Cefn Cil Sanws =

Hill (461m) in Merthyr Tydfil, Wales

Coordinates: 51.7821°N 3.4146°W

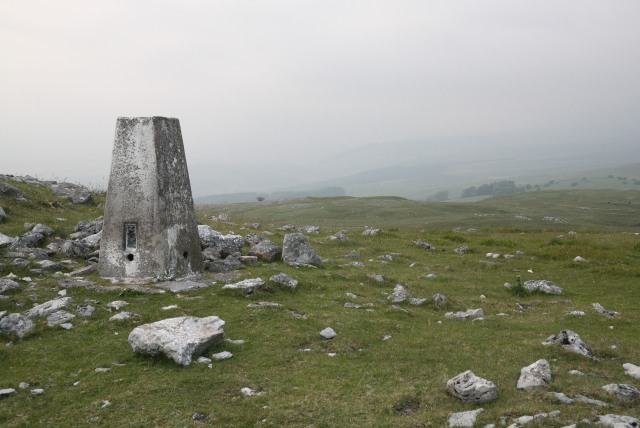
Trig point on Cefn Cil Sanws

Cefn Cil Sanws is a hill in the Brecon Beacons National Park within Merthyr Tydfil County Borough in south Wales. The summit at 460m above sea level is crowned by a trig point. The steep cliffs of Darren Fawr and Darren Fach defend its western side which drops down into Cwm Taf. A major limestone quarry is worked on the southeastern side of the hill. An unexpected feature at this altitude is Merthyr Tydfil Golf Course which extends high onto the eastern and southern slopes of the hill.

== Geology ==
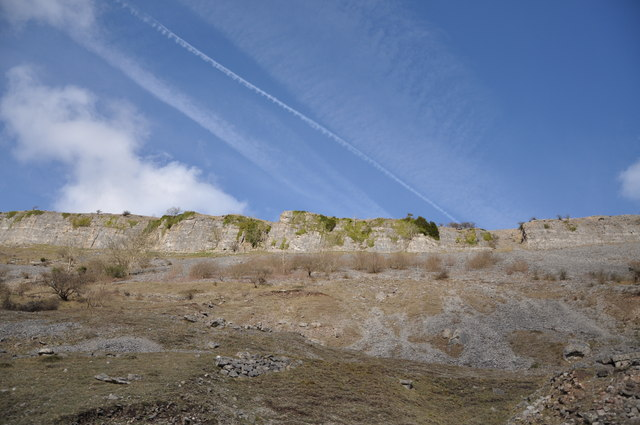
Western scree slopes of Cefn Cil Sanws

The hill is composed of a layer cake of rocks of Carboniferous age all tilted moderately to the south. The summit is formed from Carboniferous Limestone whilst outcrops of Twrch Sandstone (formerly known as the 'Basal Grit' of the Millstone Grit Series) can be seen to the north and on its steep western flanks. There are sections of limestone pavement on the tilted plateau surface and small crags and pavements of gritstone to their south. The latter show evidence of glacial striations suggesting that the hill was over-ridden by ice moving southwards from the central Beacons during the ice ages.

== Plants ==
Much of the hill is owned and managed by the Brecknock Wildlife Trust as a nature reserve. The steep cliffs of Darren Fach on the western side are the home to Britain's rarest tree - Ley's Whitebeam (Sorbus leyana) - the larger part of the country's population of these trees being found on this one cliff. Also of interest is the rare rigid buckler fern which clings to the scree slopes on this western flank.

== Access ==
Most of the hill is open country. A public footpath and a bridleway at its southern end provide access from the A470 road and from Cefn-coed-y-cymmer.
