= Pontsarn Halt railway station =

Disused railway station in Pontsarn and Vaynor, Merthyr Tydfil

Pontsarn Halt
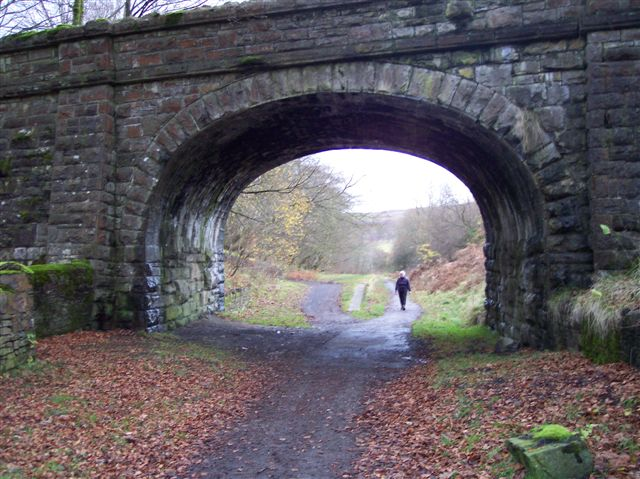
- The site of the station in 2004

General information
- Location: Vaynor, Glamorgan; Pontsarn, Glamorgan; Wales
- Coordinates: 51.7791°N 3.3877°W
- Grid reference: SO044098
- Platforms: 1

Other information
- Status: Disused

History
- Original company: Brecon and Merthyr Tydfil Junction Railway
- Pre-grouping: Brecon and Merthyr Tydfil Junction Railway
- Post-grouping: Great Western Railway

Key dates
- June 1869: Opened as Pontsarn
- 1884: Name changed to Pontsarn for Vaynor
- 1 March 1934: Name changed to Pontsarn Halt
- 1940: Name changed to Pontsarn
- 1951: Name changed back to Pontsarn Halt
- 13 November 1961: Closed
Location

Pontsarn Halt railway station served the village of Vaynor and the area of Pontsarn, Glamorgan, Wales, 1869 to 1961 on the Brecon and Merthyr Tydfil Junction Railway.

== History ==
The station opened as Pontsarn in June 1869 by the Brecon and Merthyr Tydfil Junction Railway. Its name changed to Pontsarn for Vaynor in 1884, which was changed to Pontsarn Halt on 1 March 1931. The suffix 'Halt' was dropped by the GWR timetables in 1935 and dropped completely in 1940. The suffix was added back in 1953. The station closed on 13 November 1961.

Preceding station	Disused railways	Following station
Cefn Coed; Line and station closed	Brecon and Merthyr Tydfil Junction Railway; Merthyr branch	Pontsticill; Line and station closed
Cefn Coed; Line and station closed	London and North Western Railway	Pantysgallog (Low Level) Halt; Line and station closed
