= Pontsticill railway station =

Former railway station in Wales

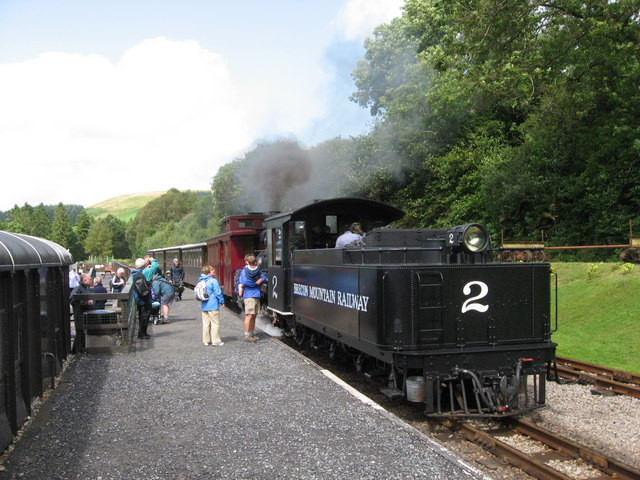
- A down train waiting in the platform at Pontsticill

General information
- Location: Pontsticill, Merthyr Tydfil County Borough; Wales
- Coordinates: 51.7998°N 3.3607°W
- Grid reference: SO06281210
- Operator: Brecon Mountain Railway
- Platforms: 1 (historically 3)

Other information
- Status: Operational

History
- Original company: Brecon and Merthyr Tydfil Junction Railway
- Pre-grouping: Brecon and Merthyr Tydfil Junction Railway
- Post-grouping: Great Western Railway

Key dates
- 19 March 1863: Station opens
- 31 December 1962: Station closes to passengers and goods
- 8 June 1980: Station reopens (BMR)
Location

Pontsticill railway station (historically Pontsticill Junction railway station) is an intermediate station on the Brecon Mountain Railway at Pontsticill, in the historic Welsh county of Brecknockshire, now Merthyr Tydfil County Borough.

The station was previously the junction at which the Brecon and Merthyr Tydfil Railway line from Torpantau in the North split to serve the Brecon & Merthyr Railway main line and the Merthyr Tydfil branch. Today it is no longer a junction.

The station opened in 1863. It was closed for 17 years from January 1963 to June 1980.

== History ==
=== Brecon and Merthyr Tydfil Junction Railway ===
The junction site before the main line railway closed

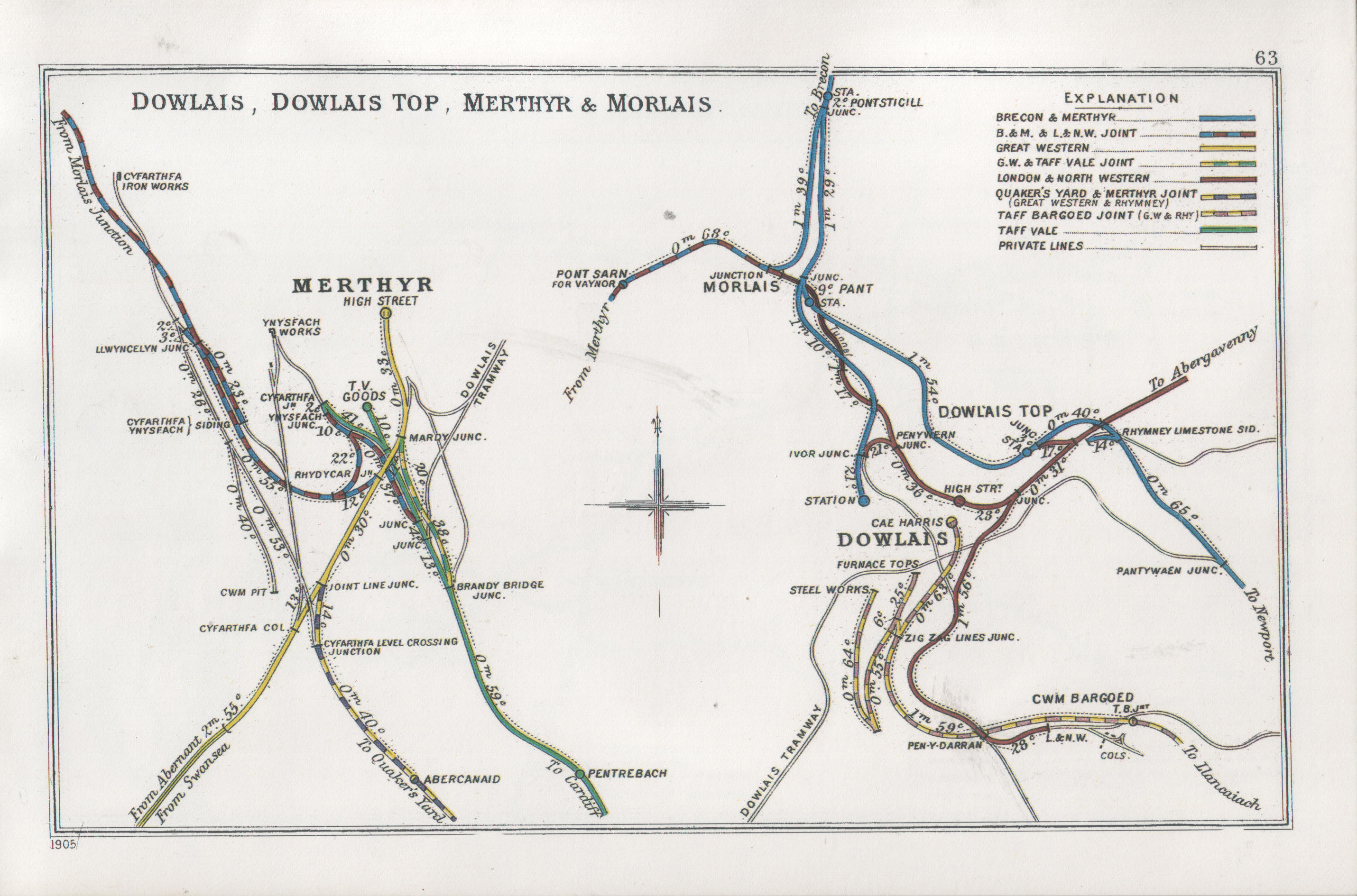
Railway lines around Dowlais in 1905

The Brecon and Merthyr Tydfil Junction Railway obtained the Brecon and Merthyr Junction Railway Act 1859 (22 & 23 Vict. c. lxviii) on 1 August 1859 to construct a line between Talybont and Pant. Train services between Brecon and Pant officially began on 23 April 1863 but two trains per day ran from 19 March 1863. This line, running south from Pontsticill to Pant, is the route still operated by the Brecon Mountain Railway.

Pontsticill became a junction in 1868, with the opening of a second southerly line, running down a steep gradient to Morlais, where it connected with the London and North Western Railway line between Dowlais and Merthyr Tydfil, as part of a line sharing arrangement. The line from Pontsticill to Morlais Junction is disused, and the track lifted.

=== Great Western Railway ===
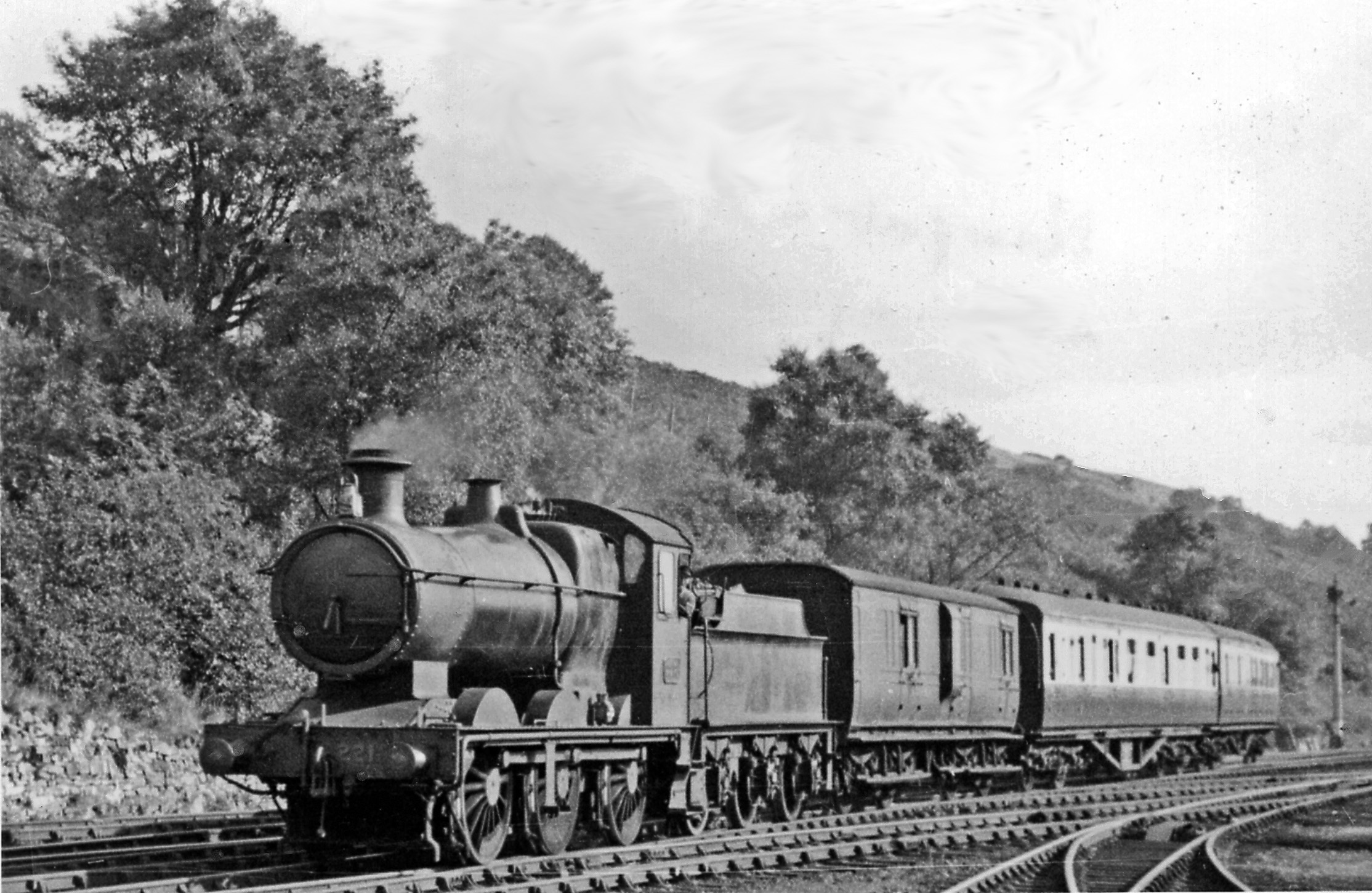
Newport to Brecon train entering Pontsticill Junction in 1949

The B&MR became part of the Great Western Railway during the Grouping of 1923. The GWR became the operator of Pontsticill Junction, maintaining services on all lines. The station passed into British Railways ownership with the nationalisation of the railways. The station closed on 31 December 1962. Freight services continued through the station until 1964.

=== Brecon Mountain Railway ===
Planning for the proposed Brecon Mountain Railway had commenced less than ten years after the closure of Pontsticill Junction, and construction work started in 1978, followed by the grant of the Brecon Mountain Railway (Light Railway) Order 1980 (SI 1980/671). Track laying between Pant and Pontsticill took place from 1979 to 1980.

At Pontsticill the signal box was derelict, and the station house had been in temporary use as a sheep shelter. Both buildings were renovated. The original waiting room was converted into an engineers' workshop, and a rolling stock storage shed was built. Seven bridges were repaired or replaced between Pant and Pontsticill.

Pontsticill station re-opened to passengers in June 1980. Pontsticill was the terminus of the re-opened line from 1980 to 1994; from 1995 the line was further re-opened northwards.

== The station today ==
One platform is in use for passenger trains, with passenger facilities including a cafeteria and toilets. The original signal box and station house are on the eastern side of the station site.

The original stone waiting room, used as a temporary workshop for several years from 1980, has since been converted and extended to form a small steam museum with a collection of stationary steam engines, displays, artefacts, and 3 small working steam locomotives.

The stock storage sheds remain in place, south of the station. Although these sheds and the temporary workshop, were all vital in the early years of restoration, the BMR today has more extensive sheds, together with new workshops, at Pant station.

Preceding station	Heritage railways	Following station
Torpantau Terminus	Brecon Mountain Railway	Pant Terminus
Disused railways
Dolygaer; Line and station closed	Brecon and Merthyr Tydfil Junction Railway; Northern section	Pant; Line and station closed
Dolygaer; Line and station closed	Brecon and Merthyr Tydfil Junction Railway; Merthyr branch	Pontsarn Halt; Line and station closed
