= Heolgerrig =

Coordinates: 51.7459°N 3.4028°W

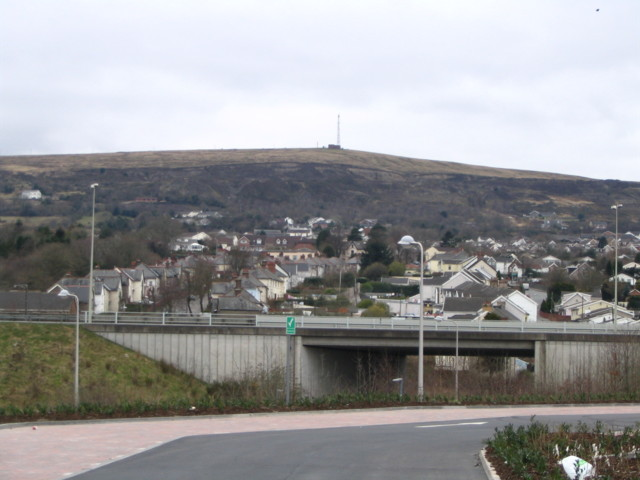
- The village of Heolgerrig with the A470 trunk road in the foreground and Mynydd Aberdâr beyond

- Location within Merthyr Tydfil
- OS grid reference: SO034067
- Principal area: Merthyr Tydfil
- Preserved county: Mid Glamorgan
- Country: Wales
- Sovereign state: United Kingdom
- Post town: Merthyr Tydfil
- Postcode district: CF48
- Dialling code: 01685
- Police: South Wales
- Fire: South Wales
- Ambulance: Welsh
- UK Parliament: Merthyr Tydfil and Aberdare
- Senedd Cymru – Welsh Parliament: Merthyr Tydfil and Rhymney

Heolgerrig (Welsh pronunciation: [heː.ɔlˈɡɛrɪɡ]) (Welsh for "stony road"; formerly "Pen-yr-Heolgerrig") is a small village in Merthyr Tydfil County Borough, Wales. It is part of the community of Cyfarthfa.

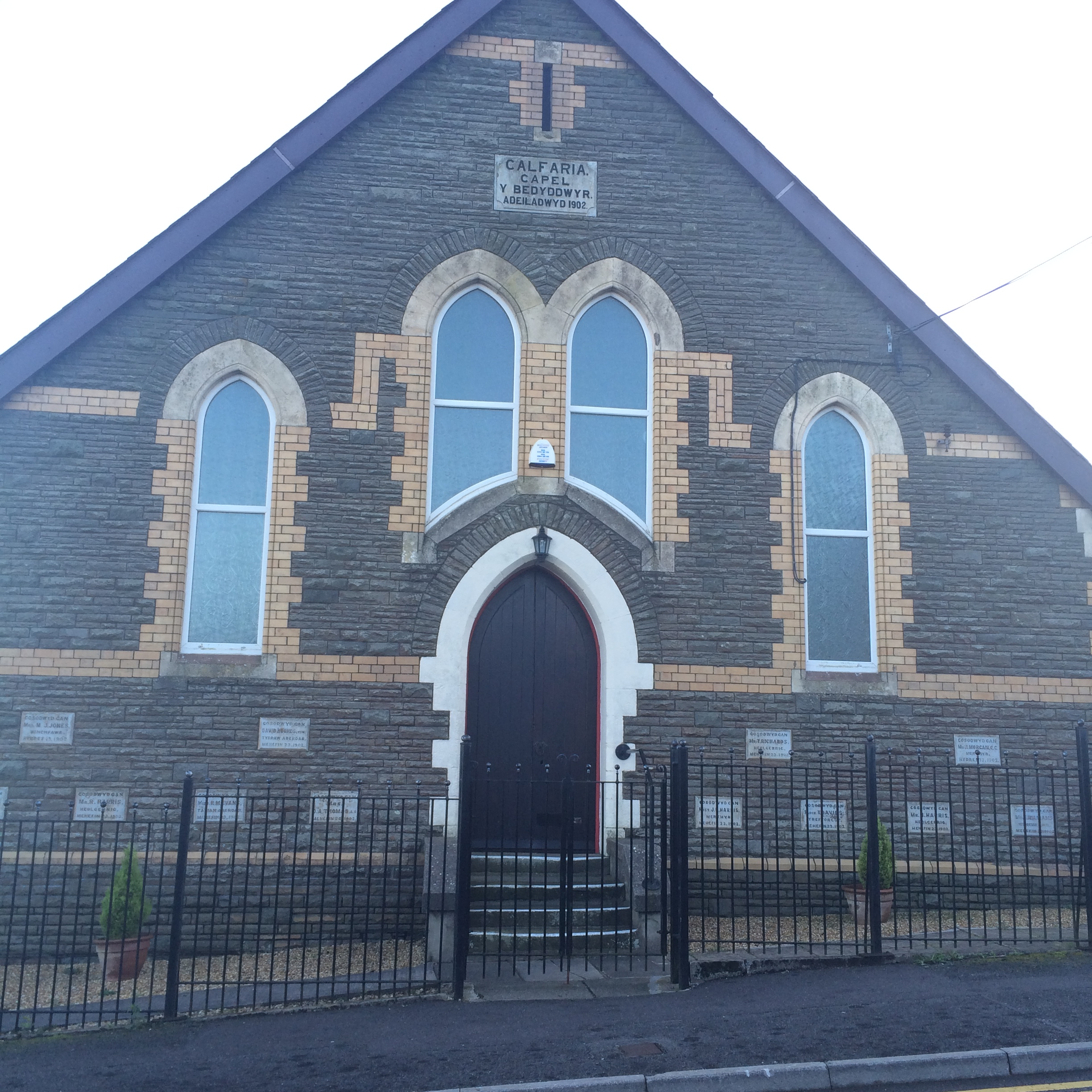
Calfaria Welsh chapel in Heolgerrig, Merthyr Tydfil.

It lies just west of Merthyr Tydfil, and is separated from it by the main A470 trunk road.

Village amenities include the Heolgerrig primary school, The Red Lion pub, The Heolgerrig Social Club, three chapels and a post office, a small convenience store and a large football pitch named "The Moodies" used by Heolgerrig Red Lions FC.

The village was served by Heolgerrig Halt railway station at one time.

== People from Heolgerrig ==
- Mike Jenkins (poet)
- Richard Harrington (actor)
- Jonny Owen (actor)
