= Cefn Coed railway station =

Disused railway station in Cefn Coed, Merthyr Tydfil

Coordinates: 51.7615°N 3.4057°W

Cefn Coed

General information
- Location: Cefn Coed, Glamorgan; Wales
- Platforms: 2

Other information
- Status: Disused

History
- Original company: Brecon and Merthyr Tydfil Junction Railway
- Pre-grouping: Brecon and Merthyr Tydfil Junction Railway
- Post-grouping: Great Western Railway

Key dates
- 1 August 1867: Opened as Cefn
- 1 May 1920: Name changed to Cefn Coed
- 13 November 1961: Closed to passengers
- 4 May 1964: Closed to goods
Location

Cefn Coed railway station served the suburb of Cefn-coed-y-cymmer, Glamorgan, Wales, from 1867 to 1964 on the Brecon and Merthyr Tydfil Junction Railway.

== History ==
The station opened as Cefn on 1 August 1867 by the Brecon and Merthyr Tydfil Junction Railway. 'Coed' was added to its name on 1 May 1920. 'Halt' was also added to its name in 1934, but this only appeared in Bradshaw. The station closed to passengers on 13 November 1961 and closed to goods on 4 May 1964.

Preceding station	Disused railways	Following station
Heolgerrig Halt; Line and station closed	Brecon and Merthyr Tydfil Junction Railway; Merthyr branch	Pontsarn Halt; Line and station closed
Heolgerrig Halt; Line and station closed	London and North Western Railway	Pontsarn Halt; Line and station closed
