= Pantywaun Halt railway station =

Disused railway station in Bute Town, Caerphilly

Coordinates: 51.7628°N 3.3197°W

Pantywaun Halt

General information
- Location: Bute Town, Caerphilly; Wales
- Platforms: 1

Other information
- Status: Disused

History
- Post-grouping: Great Western Railway

Key dates
- 22 December 1941: Opened
- 31 December 1962: Closed
Location

Pantywaun Halt railway station served the hamlet of Pantywaun and village of Bute Town, Caerphilly, Wales on the Brecon and Merthyr Tydfil Junction Railway. The site of the halt does not appear on os maps but was likely in private ownership. Nothing remains of the halt.

Preceding station	Disused railways	Following station
Dowlais Top; Line and station closed	Great Western Railway; Brecon and Merthyr Tydfil Junction Railway	Fochriw; Line and station closed
