= Quarries of Vaynor =

Series of limestone quarries in Wales

The Quarries of Vaynor refer to the limestone quarries around Vaynor, a village in Merthyr Tydfil County Borough, Wales.

Vaynor lies north of the A465 road and Merthyr Tydfil town. There are many limestone quarries in the area and the remains are still visible along the trails and on the hillsides. The limestone quarried there has been used for centuries for buildings and bridges and also to burn and make lime for agricultural use. Ruins of limekilns are scattered around the hillsides.

== History ==
=== Limestone for iron furnaces ===
The first limestone extracted at Vaynor other than for lime-burning was by William Crawshay, who owned the land. He began quarrying there to provide limestone for his ironworks. It was used to purify the iron ore. William Crawshay II the "Iron King" employed 5,000 people in his Cyfarthfa Ironworks in the 1830s. Its industry consumed 91,440 tonnes of iron ore, 20.320 tonnes of coal and 40,640 tonnes of lime annually. The frightful poverty and desperate living and working conditions for the people in the ironworks and supplying the raw materials like coal, iron ore and limestone led to a high risk of disease, appalling infant mortality, starvation and riots.

=== The Merthyr Rising ===
In June 1831 workers and their families demonstrated. Dafydd Lewis of Cefn Coed was one of the local leaders. The revolt ended when soldiers were brought in. Four men were transported and Dic Penderyn was hung.

=== End of production ===
A thousand tons of limestone per day was produced in 1957.

Eventually production stopped in the 1990s.

== Working conditions ==
The historic safery record of the quarrying industry has been poor. Frequent accidents and fatalities were reported in local newspapers. • Shocking quarry accident. One man buried alive in Vaynor Quarry, the scene of a most deplorable accident. Merthyr Times Tuesday 13 Feb 1896 • Killed at Vaynor Quarry. Inquest held on body of quarryman aged 58 who succumbed to injuries received at quarry. Evening Express 8 December 1906 • Killed at Messrs. Crawshay Brothers’ Vaynor Quarry...a piece of rock weighing about 30 cwt came upon the deceased from above. Evening Express 5th Jan 1907 • Quarrymen's dispute...the hands employed at Vaynor Quarry are seeking an advance of one penny per ton. The Weekly Mail 24 September 1904
