= Cefn-coed-y-cymmer =

Community in Merthyr Tydfil, Wales

Coordinates: 51.762°N 3.404°W

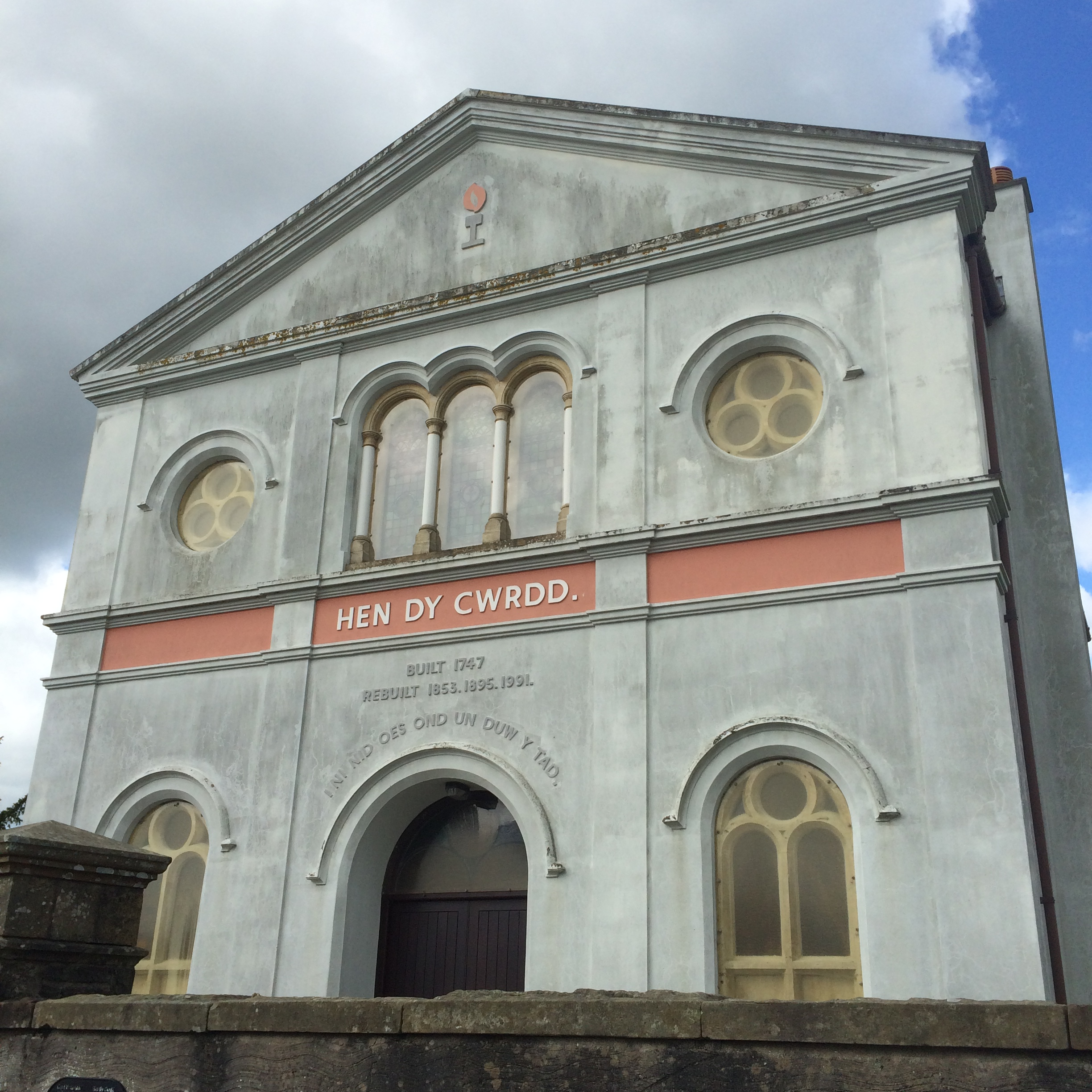
Hen Dŷ Cwrdd chapel

Cefn-coed-y-cymmer (Welsh: Cefncoedycymer; pronounced [ˌkɛvɛnˌkɔi̯dəˈkəmɛr]) is a small community on the northwestern edge of Merthyr Tydfil County Borough in Wales. It is situated in the neck of land between the rivers Taf Fawr and Taf Fechan at their confluence (Welsh: 'cymer'). The village lies within the community of Vaynor. Immediately to the north of the village is the hill of Cefn Cil Sanws on the southern slopes of which is Merthyr Tydfil Golf Club. The village is bounded both to the north and the west by the Brecon Beacons National Park.

Notable features of the village are the A465 Heads of the Valleys Road and the impressive curving Cefn Coed Viaduct. The viaduct, which spans the Taf Fawr river, came into being as part of the Merthyr- Pontsticill junction line. This additional line extended the Brecon and Merthyr Railway and was only agreed following a special Act of Parliament in July 1862 to allow its construction. The Cefn Coed Cemetery with its Jewish burial ground is listed on the Cadw/ICOMOS Register of Parks and Gardens of Special Historic Interest in Wales.

The village was once served by Cefn Coed railway station. The Station Hotel still survives.

== Spelling of the name ==
Cefn-coed-y-cymmer is in fact a poor Welsh spelling used as an English form of the name (there is no doubling of "m" in standard Welsh spelling, and the hyphens are unnecessary). This form can be seen, for example, on the Ordnance Survey six-inch to the mile map 1888-1913.

The standard Welsh spelling for the village is Cefncoedycymer, though road signs show Cefn Coed y Cymer. The latter is in fact the non-habitative name (such names, referring to geographic features, are spelt in Welsh with the elements separated) and is the name of the hill after which the village is named. In standard Welsh spellings, settlement names are spelt with the elements run together, hence Cefncoedycymer.

Other spellings are found in an English context, such as Cefn coed y cymer and Cefn Coed-y-cymmer.

The meaning is “the back (cefn) of / by / at Coed y Cymer”, where “Coed y Cymer” is “the wood (coed) at the confluence (y cymer)”, where the Taf Fechan river joins the Taf Fawr river to form Afon Taf (the river Taff).

Coed y Cymer was a dense woodland here that was felled in 1765 to provide wood for Anthony Bacon’s blast furnace at his Cyfarthfa ironworks.

The short form of the village name in Welsh is Y Cefn, hence Pont y Cefn (“the Cefn bridge”), an old bridge by the modern river bridge carrying the A4054 Brecon Road over the Taf Fechan. In English the short form locally is Cefn (“Her brother lives in Cefn”) and to be more specific about which Cefn is being referred to (there are many villages with the short form “Cefn”), Cefn-coed / Cefn Coed is used (“she attended Hen Dŷ Cwrdd Chapel in Cefn Coed”).

In place names in Welsh, the definite article might be omitted (though understood to be present) and so “Cefncoedcymer” is also found – an internet search will show such instances of this spelling.

As the village is on the northern boundary of the Gwentian dialect area of the Welsh language (i.e. the south-east of Wales), local pronunciations have shown typical Gwentian features, with “cefan” [ˈke·van] for “cefn” [ˈke·vɛn], “co'd” [kɔ:d] for “coed” [kɔi̯d], and “cymar” [ˈkəmar] for “cymer” [ˈkəmɛr], though with the disappearance of traditional spoken Welsh in the area they are probably not often heard nowadays, if at all.

== Viaduct ==
Cefn Coed Viaduct
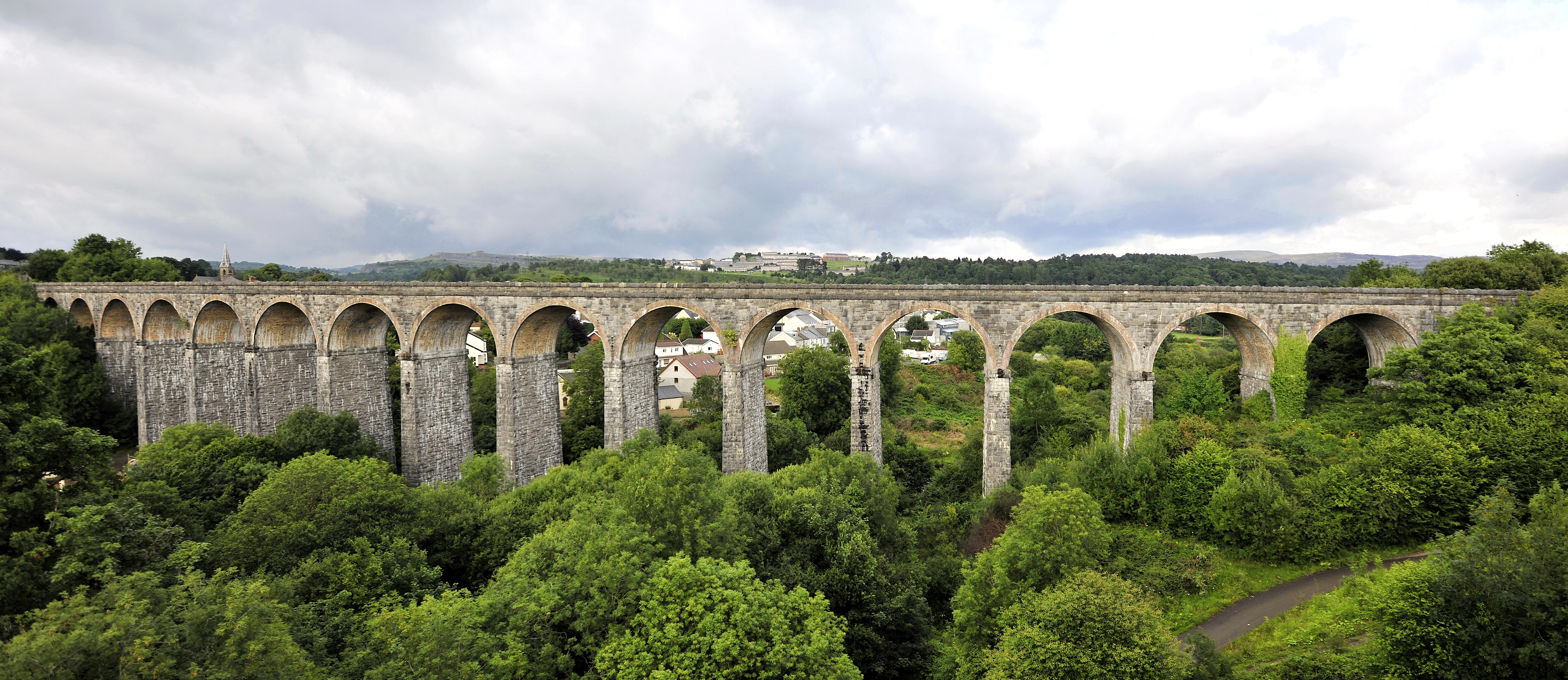
- Panoramic view of the viaduct in 2010
- Interactive map of Cefn Coed Viaduct

Listed Building – Grade II*
- Official name: Cefn Railway Viaduct
- Designated: 11 July 1951; Amended 19 December 2002 and 16 June 2003
- Reference no.: 11377 and 11382 (dual-listed)

Cefn viaduct is the third largest in Wales and is a Grade II* listed building. It was designed by Alexander Sutherland in conjunction with Henry Conybeare and partly built by Thomas Savin and John Ward. In early 1866, the project faced disaster when Savin and Ward suffered serious financial and legal difficulties. It was eventually completed with the assistance of Alexander Sutherland. He produced an alternative route into Merthyr, curving the viaduct, so that the railway line avoided property owned by ironmaster Robert Thompson Crawshay. It cost £25,000 to build (equivalent to £3.5 million in 2024). or (equivalent to £2,630,000 in 2025)

It consists of 15 arches, each one 39 feet 6 inches wide, and is 770 ft. long with a maximum height of 115 ft. It was planned to be constructed entirely of limestone like the nearby Pontsarn Viaduct but a trade union strike by stonemasons in February 1866 caused the company to buy 800,000 bricks and use bricklayers to complete the 15 arches. It was completed on 29 October 1866, three years after the main line which linked it with Brecon. The last trains travelled over the viaduct in the mid 1960s and it subsequently fell into disrepair. It was refurbished by Merthyr Tydfil County Borough Council with assistance from a grant from the National Lottery. It has now become part of the Taff Trail, route 8 of the National Cycleway.

Cefn Coed Viaduct
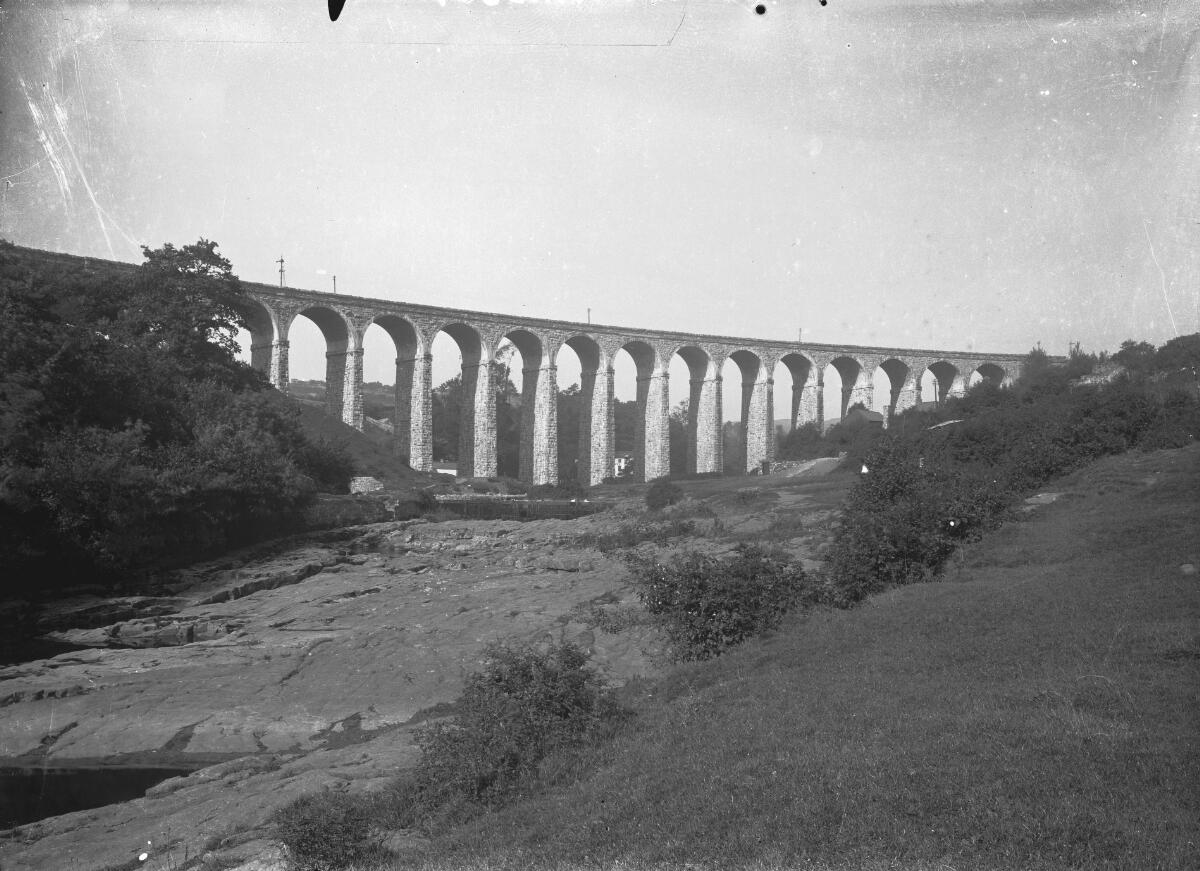
Cefn Coed Viaduct in 1905

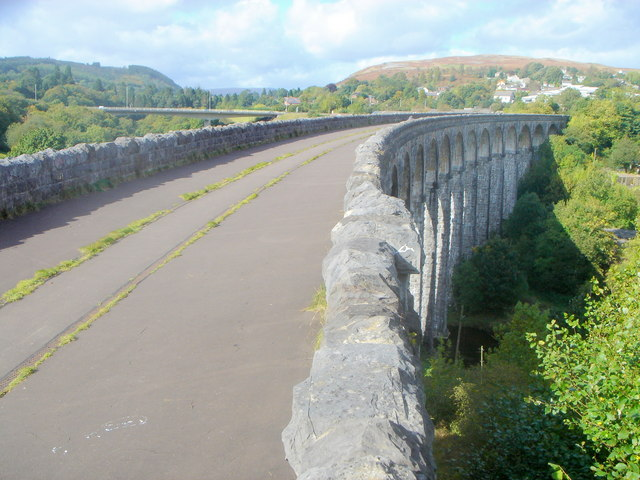
Cefn Coed Viaduct in 2008

== Cefn-coed Cemetery and the Jewish burial ground ==
Beyond the last buildings of Cefn, parallel to the A470 Merthyr to Brecon road, lies another site of historical interest. Within the Cefn-coed Cemetery is the Jewish burial ground, one of the largest in Wales outside Cardiff. It was established and consecrated in the 1860s by the then thriving Merthyr Hebrew Congregation. The growth of the Jewish population in the area was mainly linked to the expansion of the mining and ironworks industry in the locality. Many were refugees from Russia, Poland and Romania, fleeing religious persecution. The cost of the land for the cemetery was mainly paid for by the local community, but contributions were also made by Jewish communities and individuals across Britain, the largest amount being £10 from the politician and philanthropist, Baron Lionel de Rothschild. Initially the cemetery was simply a burial ground, with no building on the site. In the late 1890s a simple brick built prayer house (ohel) was constructed, again using funds raised by the local Jewish community. In 1935, the cemetery was extended, with the new section being formally consecrated in October 1935. A map of the cemetery is held in the archives at Merthyr Tydfil Central Library. The map shows the location of approximately 570 graves, and gives the names and dates of death of many of the deceased. Towards the end of the twentieth century, the Jewish population declined. The community has now left the Merthyr area and responsibility for maintenance of the cemetery has been transferred to the Local Authority. The cemetery is listed at Grade II on the Cadw/ICOMOS Register of Parks and Gardens of Special Historic Interest in Wales.
