= Nant Glais Caves =

Caves in Merthyr Tydfil, Wales

Coordinates: 51°47′11.7″N 3°23′39.3″W

The Nant Glais Caves are a collection of six caves located near Vaynor in Merthyr Tydfil County Borough, South Wales. The largest cave, Ogof Rhyd Sych, measures around 2000m long. The site has been designated a Site of Special Scientific Interest.

== Geography ==
The caves are located in the Nant Glais Valley, to the west of the village of Vaynor in Merthyr Tydfil County Borough.

There are six caves at the site. The two largest, Ogof y Ci and Ogof Rhyd Sych, measure approximately 1,000–1,600 metres (3,300–5,200 ft) and 2,000 m (6,600 ft) in length respectively. Ogof y Ci has numerous offshoots on the southern edge for the passage of stream water, although they are all too narrow to be viewed. The northern side splits into two passages with one connecting the passage of water to the larger Ogof Rhyd Sych. This cave is prone to flooding as it receives the majority of overflow from the river and has been described as containing "low, wet, arduous passages". Although it is the longest of the caves at the site, traversing Rhyd Sych is difficult as it features significantly narrower passages than the others.

The next largest cave, Ogof Robin Goch, measures around 100 m (330 ft) long and leads into a chamber before being blocked by a boulder choke that connects it to Ogof Rhyd Sych. The remaining three caves, Ogof Dwr Dwfn, Ogof Pysgodyn Gwyn and Ogof Johnny Bach are all significantly smaller. The largest of the three, Pysgodyn Gwyn measures only 30 m (98 ft) in length. All three are located around Ogof Rhyd Sych.

== See also ==
- List of Sites of Special Scientific Interest in Mid & South Glamorgan
