= Daren Fach =

Protected area in Glamorgan, Wales

- Site of Special Scientific Interest
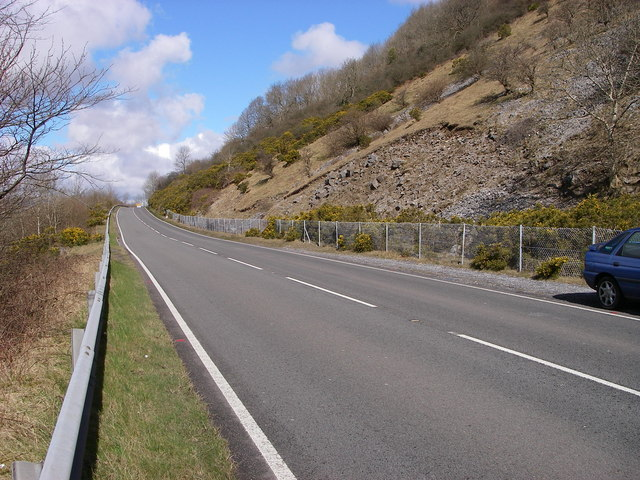
- The A470 road below the Darren Fach (Daren Fach) cliff

- Location within Wales
- Location of Daren Fach.
- Area of search: Mid and South Glamorgan
- Grid reference: SO0191410481
- Coordinates: 51.784362°N 3.4233451°W
- Interest: Biological
- Area: 12.47 ha (30.8 acres)
- Notification date: 1 January 1960

Daren Fach is a Site of Special Scientific Interest (SSSI) in Merthyr Tydfil County Borough, Mid Glamorgan, in south Wales.

It was designated in 1960, and later revised in 1983. It covers an area of 12.1 hectares (30 acres), and is administered by and within the Brecon Beacons National Park (Bannau Brycheiniog). It is also in the Vaynor community in the north of Merthyr Tydfil County Borough, as one of the county borough's four SSSIs. Part of the area is also a nature reserve of the same name, managed both privately and by the Brecknock Wildlife Trust.

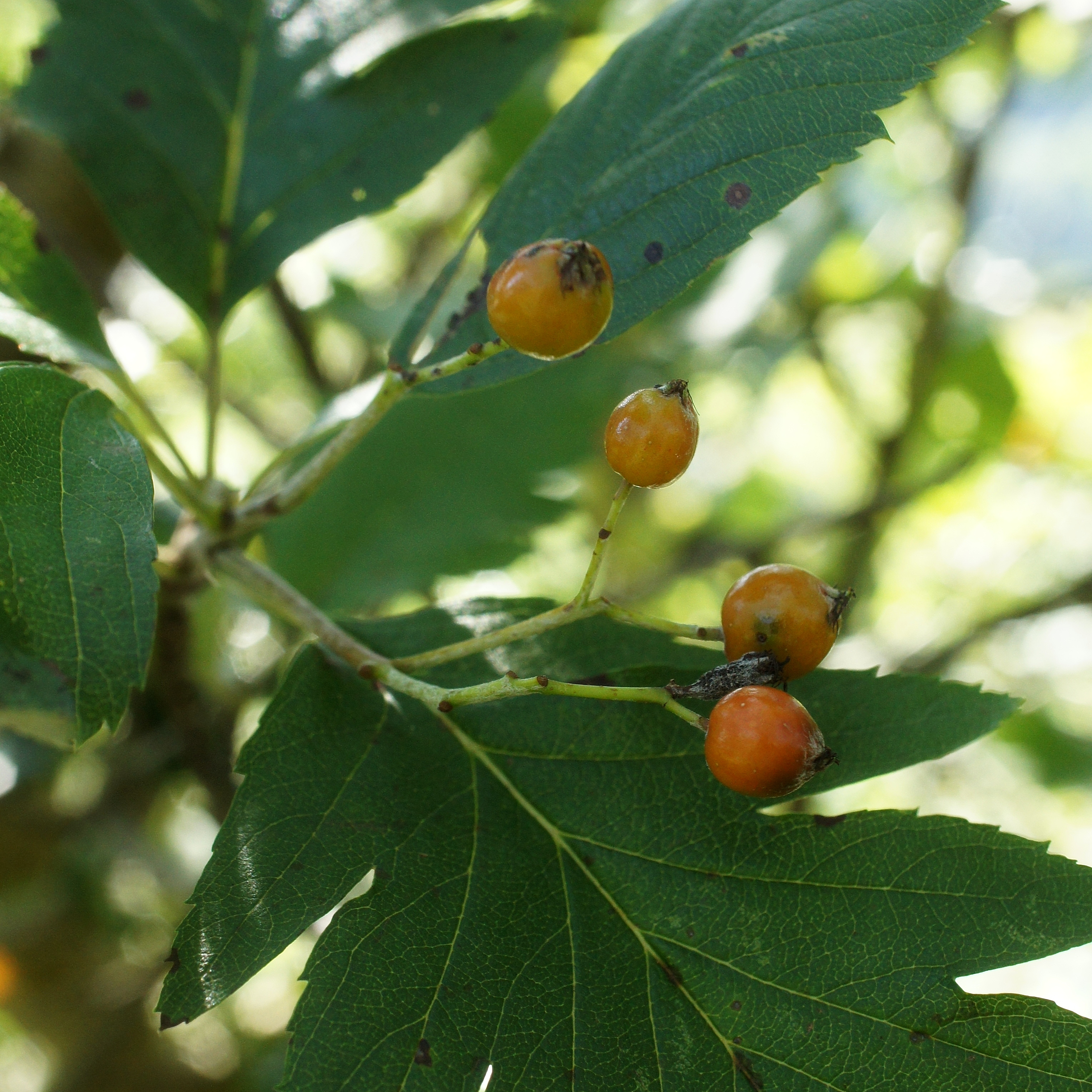
A Sorbus leyana (Ley's whitebeam) on Darren Fach

The SSSI contains open scrub on limestone screes and low limestone cliffs, with woodland (particularly ash woodland) on gentler slopes, and limestone grassland. A major element of the site is the concentration of Sorbus spp located on the southern ends of the Darren Fach (or Daren Fach) cliff (crags). The cliff and nearby Daren Fawr also contain a variety of uncommon plants which contribute to the site's special interest. It notably contains a Chalice Hawkweed (Hieracium cyathis), and a Ley's whitebeam (Sorbus leyana), the latter a rare endemic tree confined to Wales that was described as "one of the rarest trees in the world", with Daren Fach being only one of two sites in Brecknockshire having it.

== See also ==
- List of Sites of Special Scientific Interest in Mid & South Glamorgan
