= Dowlais Top railway station =

Disused railway station in Dowlais, Merthyr Tydfil

Coordinates: 51.7671°N 3.3346°W

Dowlais Top
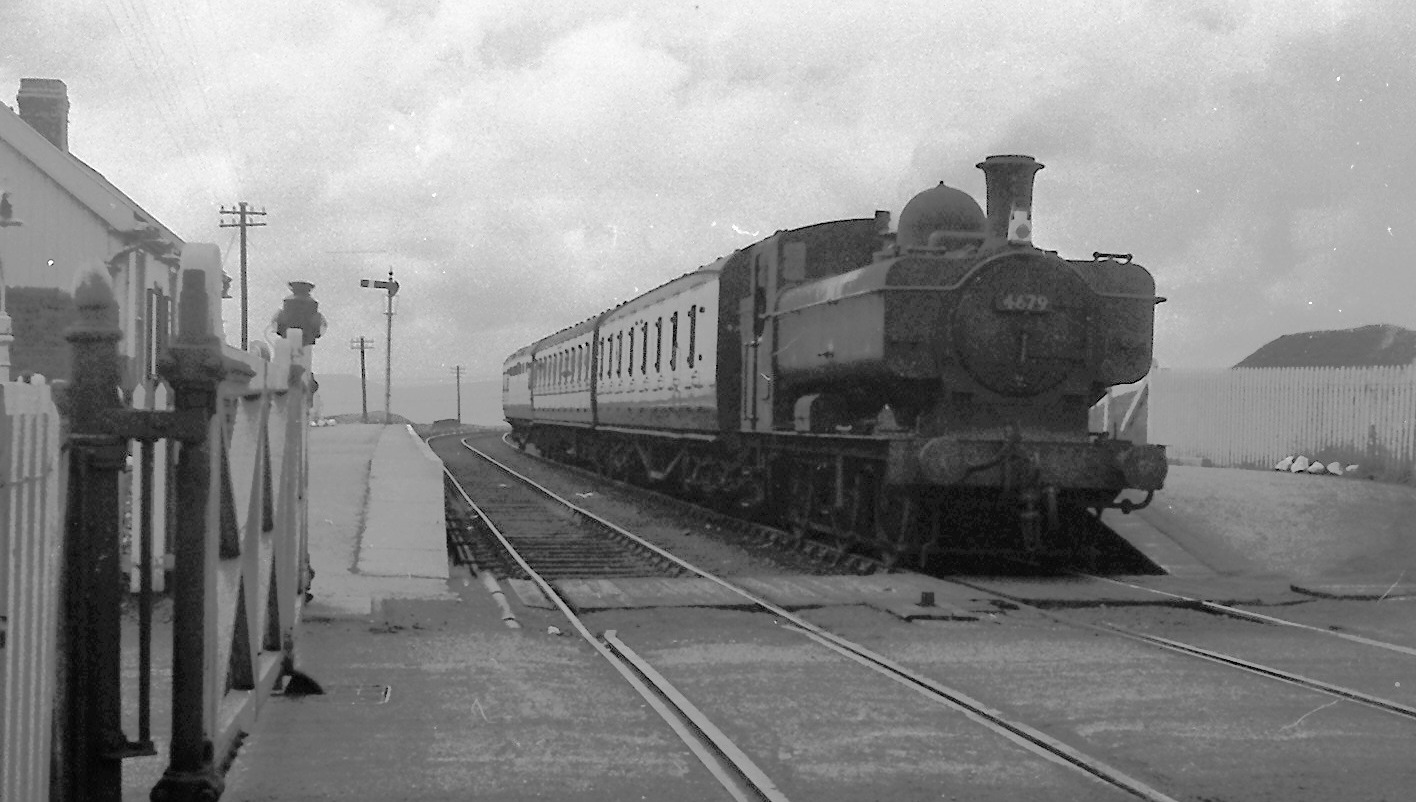
- The station in 1962

General information
- Location: Dowlais, Glamorgan; Wales
- Platforms: 3

Other information
- Status: Disused

History
- Original company: Brecon and Merthyr Tydfil Junction Railway
- Pre-grouping: Brecon and Merthyr Tydfil Junction Railway
- Post-grouping: Great Western Railway

Key dates
- 1 August 1867: Opened
- 31 December 1962: Closed
Location

Dowlais Top railway station served the village of Dowlais, Glamorgan, Wales, from 1867 to 1962 on the Brecon and Merthyr Tydfil Junction Railway.

== History ==
The station opened on 1 August 1867 by the Brecon and Merthyr Tydfil Junction Railway. To the west of the level crossing was Dowlais Top signal box. When it heavily snowed in 1947, an RAF jet used the line to clear the snow. The station closed on 31 December 1962. The station house still survives today.

Preceding station	Disused railways	Following station
Pant; Line and station closed	Brecon and Merthyr Tydfil Junction Railway; Northern section	Pantywaun Halt; Line and station closed
