= Pantysgallog (High Level) Halt railway station =

Disused railway station in Pant, Merthyr Tydfil

Pantysgallog High Level Halt

General information
- Location: Pant, Merthyr Tydfil; Wales
- Coordinates: 51.772386°N 3.355677°W
- Platforms: 2

Other information
- Status: Disused

History
- Original company: Brecon and Merthyr Tydfil Junction Railway
- Pre-grouping: Brecon and Merthyr Tydfil Junction Railway
- Post-grouping: Great Western Railway

Key dates
- 1 October 1910: Opened
- September 1939: Services suspended
- December 1940: Services resumed
- 2 May 1960: Closed
Location

Pantysgallog High Level Halt railway station was a station that served the village of Pant, Merthyr Tydfil, Wales on the Brecon and Merthyr Tydfil Junction Railway. A short branch line from Pant to Dowlais Central. The station closed in 1960 with the line and the site is now a housing estate.

== Sources ==
- Quick, Michael (2009) [2001]. Railway passenger stations in Great Britain: a chronology (4th ed.). Oxford: Railway & Canal Historical Society. ISBN 978-0-901461-57-5. OCLC 612226077.

Preceding station	Disused railways	Following station
Pant; Line and station closed	Brecon and Merthyr Tydfil Junction Railway; Northern section	Dowlais Central; Line and station closed
