= Heolgerrig Halt railway station =

Disused railway station in Heolgerrig, Merthyr Tydfil

Heolgerrig Halt

General information
- Location: Heolgerrig, Glamorgan; Wales
- Coordinates: 51.747914°N 3.394086°W
- Platforms: 1

Other information
- Status: Disused

History
- Original company: Great Western Railway

Key dates
- 31 May 1937: Opened
- 13 November 1961: Closed
Location

Heolgerrig Halt railway station served the village of Heolgerrig, in the historical county of Glamorgan, Wales, from 1937 to 1961 on the Brecon and Merthyr Tydfil Junction Railway.

== History ==
The station was opened on 31 May 1937 by the Great Western Railway, although the company notice stated that it opened on 26 May 1937. It closed on 13 November 1961.

Preceding station	Disused railways	Following station
Cefn Coed; Line and station closed	Great Western Railway; Brecon and Merthyr Tydfil Junction Railway	Merthyr High Street; Line closed. station open
Cefn Coed; Line and station closed	London, Midland and Scottish Railway; London and North Western Railway	Merthyr High Street; Line closed. station open
