= Pant railway station (Brecon Mountain Railway) =

Heritage railway station in Merthyr Tydfil, Wales

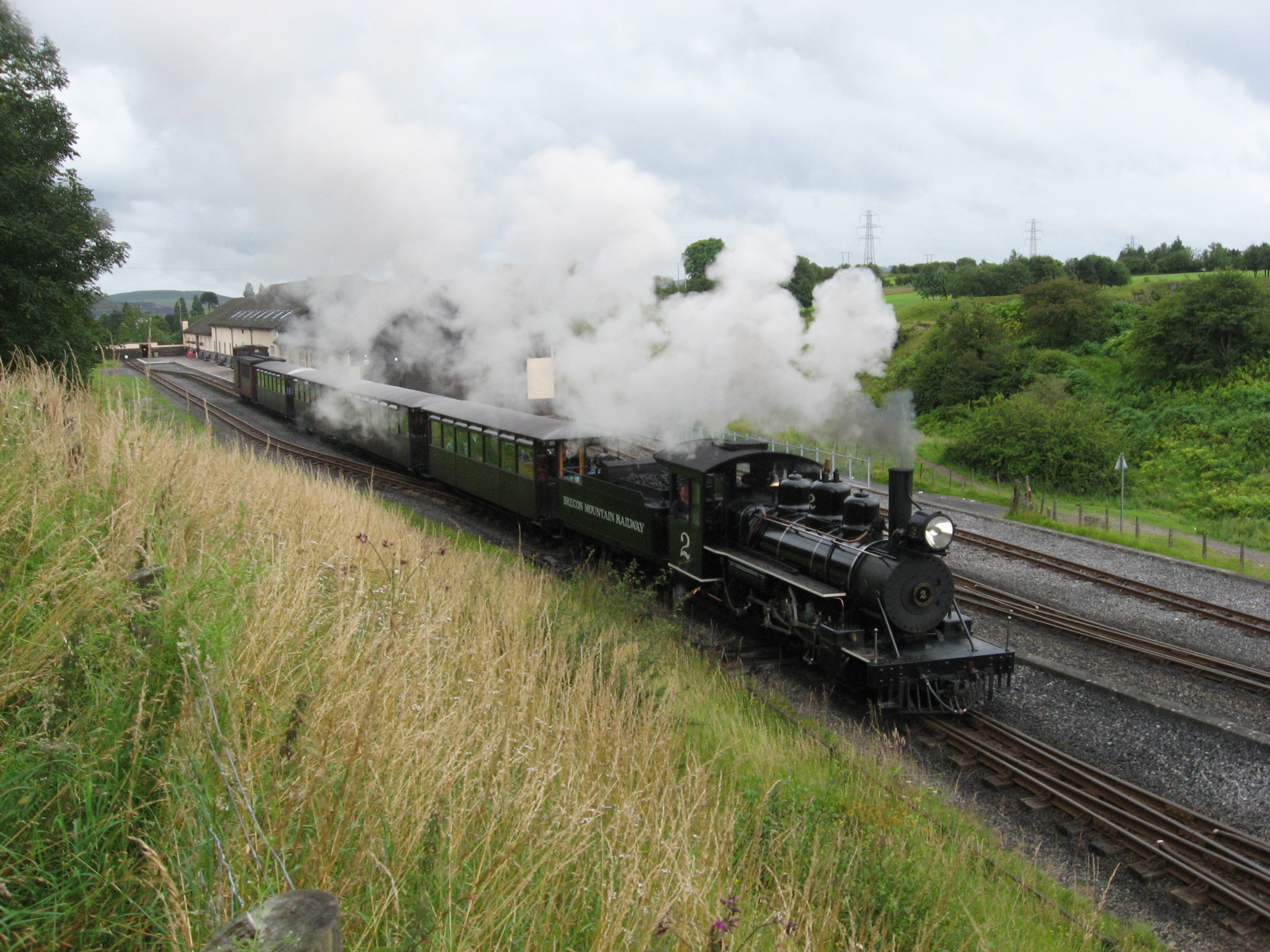
- A train departing from Pant station.

General information
- Location: Pant, Merthyr Tydfil; Wales
- Coordinates: 51.7780°N 3.3647°W
- Platforms: 1

Other information
- Status: Operational

History
- Original company: Brecon Mountain Railway

Key dates
- 8 June 1980: Station opens
Location

Pant railway station is the southern terminus of the Brecon Mountain Railway, a heritage line on the southern edge of the Brecon Beacons National Park in Wales.

== History ==
Following its closure in 1964, a small group sought to reopen a section of the disused Brecon and Merthyr Tydfil Junction Railway line, initially from Pant to Pontsticill, as a heritage attraction. By 1972 applications had been submitted for planning consents, and by 1978 the group, now named the Brecon Mountain Railway, had obtained a light railway order.

Despite following much of the original trackbed, the site of the original Pant railway station was no longer available, and an alternative location was established to the West. It opened to passengers as a brand new station on 8 June 1980.

The station site was expanded and improved in stages between 1982 and 1996, adding additional passenger facilities, and engineering facilities for the railway in an extensive depot complex.

== Facilities ==
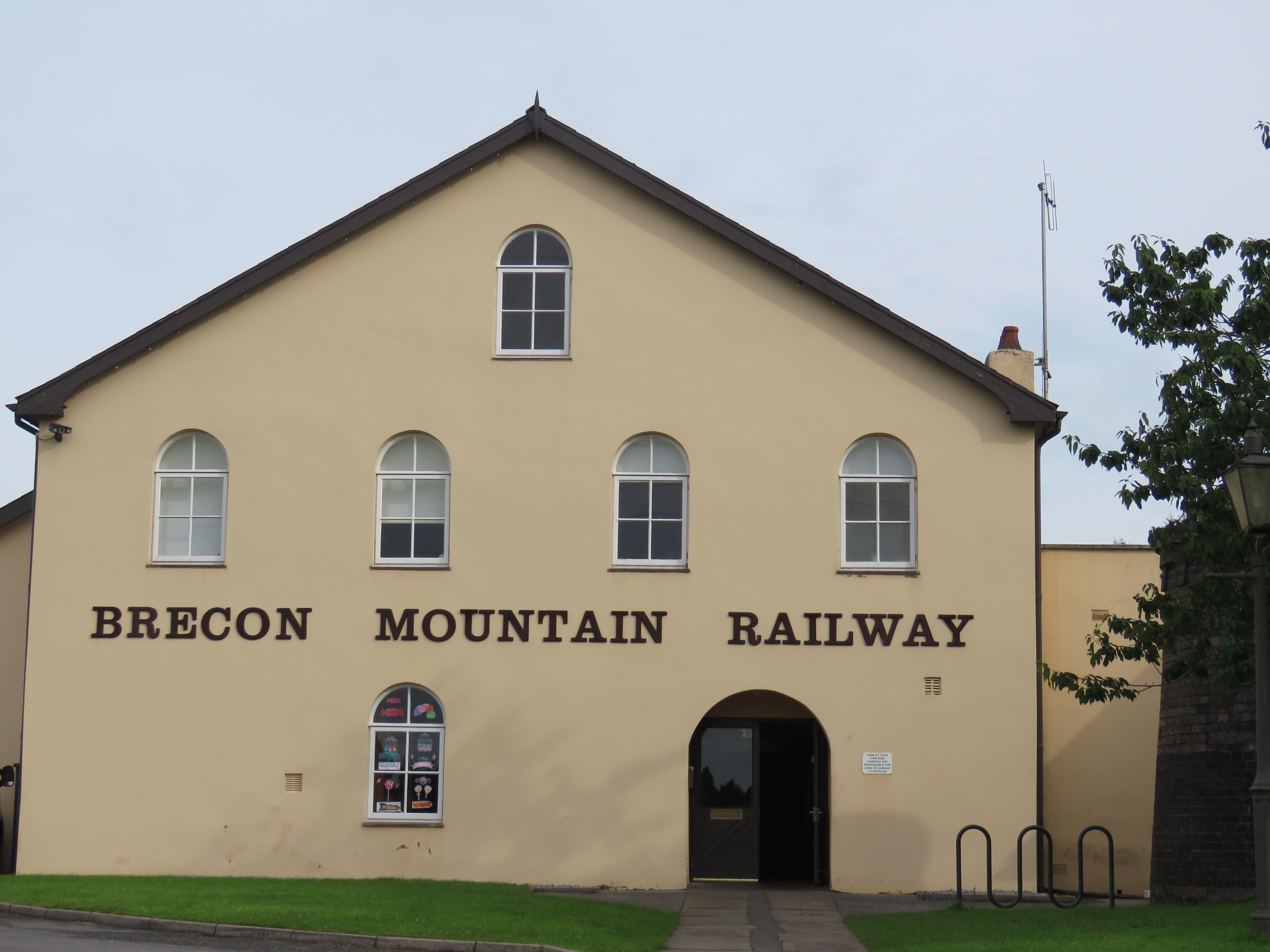
The station entrance

The station site has a public tearoom and cafeteria, a gift shop, a booking office, toilets, and a large car park. The associated depot site incorporates an erecting shop capable of constructing rolling stock, a locomotive shed, and a carriage and wagon workshop, all of which are open to the public, by means of secure viewing platforms.

There is a single platform for passenger train operations, with a locomotive-release headshunt and run-round loop. There is a yard with sidings for the storage of engineering vehicles.

== Original station ==
The original Pant station opened in 1863 as part of the Brecon and Merthyr Tydfil Junction Railway. It became part of the Great Western Railway, and closed in 1964 as part of the nationalised British Railways network. The site is now disused, though the original two platforms remain intact.

Preceding station	Heritage railways	Following station
Pontsticill towards Torpantau	Brecon Mountain Railway	Terminus
