= Pontsticill =

Village in Merthyr Tydfil, Wales

Coordinates: 51.791°N 3.370°W

Pontsticill (Welsh pronunciation: [pɔntˈstɪkɪɬ]) is a village within the County Borough of Merthyr Tydfil in South Wales. It lies within the valley of the Taf Fechan on the southern edge of the Brecon Beacons National Park. The village lies within the community of Vaynor in an area that was, until the local government re-organisation of 1974, within the historic county of Brecknockshire.

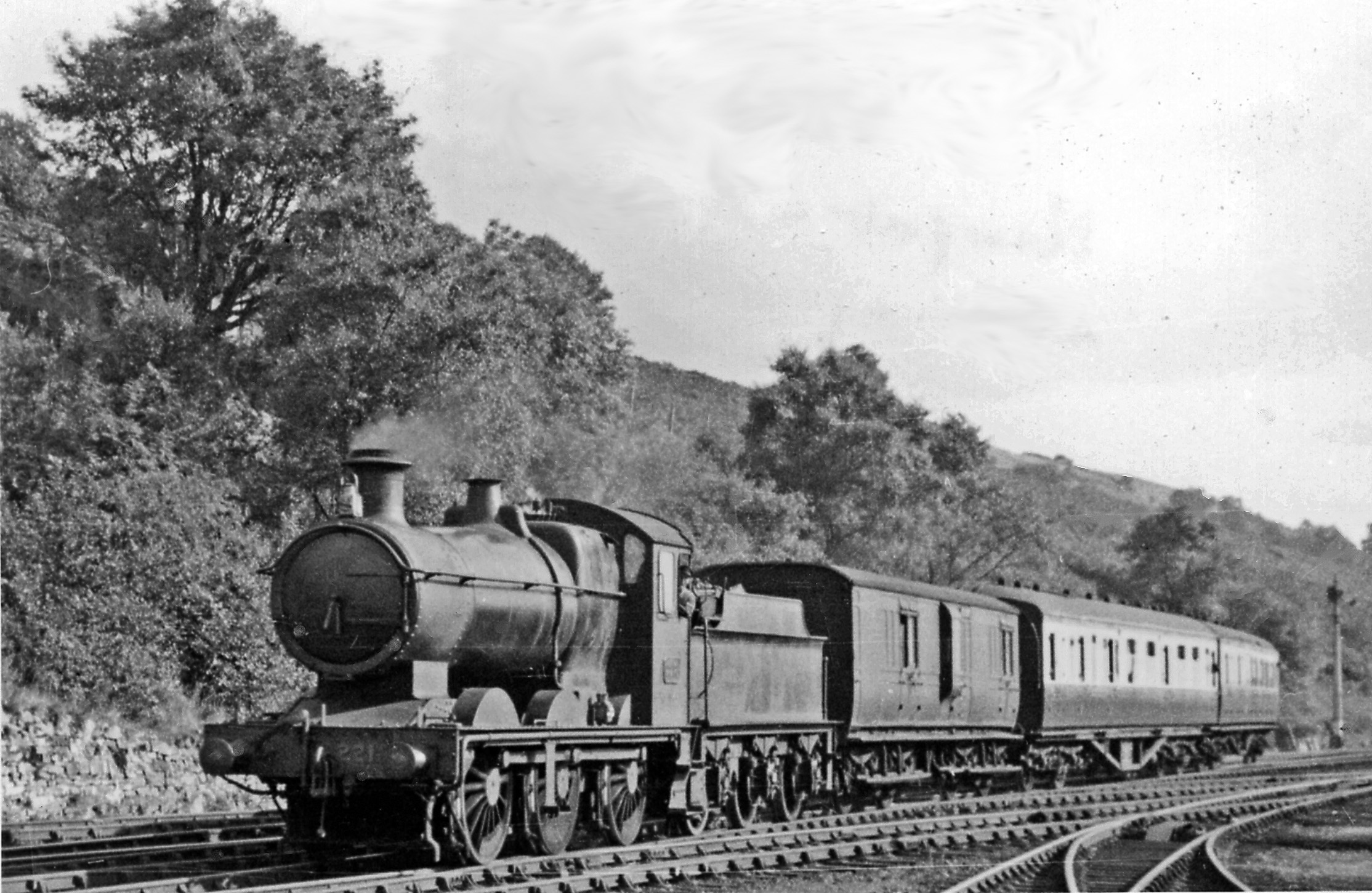
Newport - Brecon train entering the former Pontsticill Junction railway station in 1949

Pontsticill is closely associated with the Brecon Mountain Railway, a tourist railway which runs along the former Brecon and Merthyr Railway line. Immediately to the north of the village is the Pontsticill Reservoir which was completed in 1927.

The village name originates from the Welsh words pont and sticill and signifies a 'bridge near a stile'.

== Pontsticill Reservoir ==
Pontsticill Reservoir, originally Taff Fechan Reservoir, was opened in 1927 to supply water to much of the South Wales Valleys. The 110 ft high embankment holds 15,400 megalitres of water. The reservoir is popular with sailors, anglers and picnickers.

== Abercriban Quarries ==
To the north of Pontsticill and to the east of the reservoir, lie Abercriban Quarries, a Site of Special Scientific Interest. Abercriban Quarries comprise two small disused quarries. The site is of special interest for the rock exposures of the Grey Grit Formation of the Upper Old Red Sandstone; these exposed rocks span the boundary between the Carboniferous and Devonian periods of geological time, approximately 360 million years ago.

== Twinning ==
On 15 March 2023, the town of Pontsticill twinned with the town of Livré-sur-Changeon, in France
