= Torpantau railway station =

Former railway station in Wales

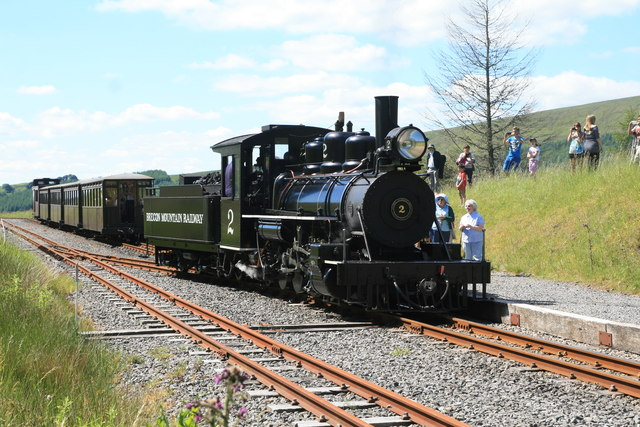
- The station in 2014, two months after re-opening.

General information
- Location: Brecon Beacons, Powys; Wales
- Coordinates: 51.84052°N 3.38090°W
- Grid reference: SO049166
- Operated by: Brecon Mountain Railway
- Platforms: 1 (historically 2)

Other information
- Status: Operational

History
- Original company: Brecon and Merthyr Tydfil Junction Railway
- Pre-grouping: Brecon and Merthyr Tydfil Junction Railway
- Post-grouping: Great Western Railway

Key dates
- 18 June 1863: Station opened
- 31 December 1962: Station closed
- 1 April 2014: Station reopened on adjacent site

Torpantau railway station is a station in the Welsh county of Brecknockshire (now in Powys), and the northern terminus of the narrow gauge Brecon Mountain Railway.

It had previously been a station on the standard gauge line from Merthyr to Brecon, and was the highest station on the Brecon and Merthyr Railway.

The standard gauge and narrow gauge stations are in the same broad location, but on different specific sites, on opposite sides of the Torpantau to Abercynafon road.

== History ==
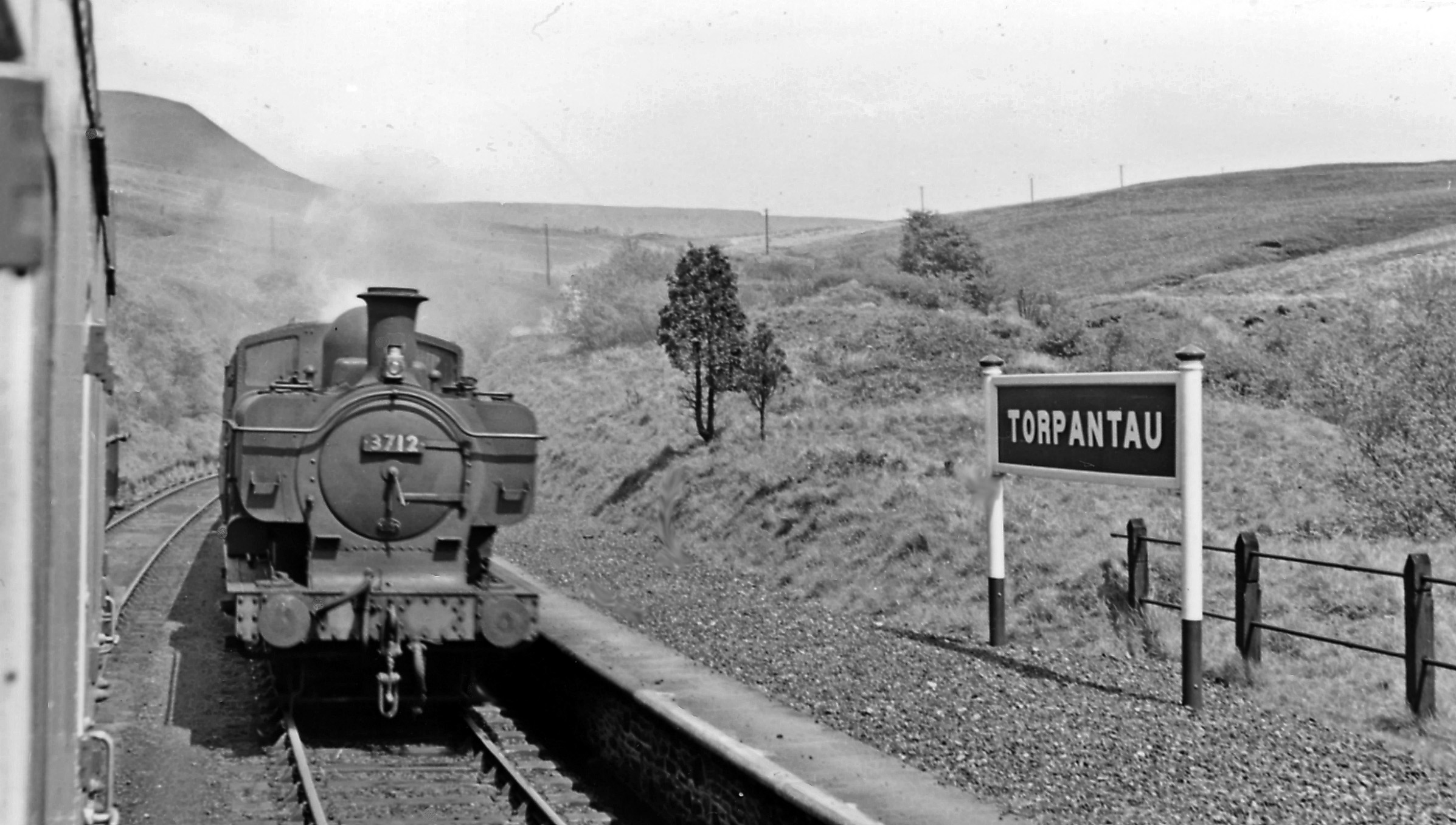
A 1957 view northward towards Torpantau Tunnel.

The station was opened in 1863 by the Brecon and Merthyr Tydfil Junction Railway. Torpantau is a remote location, though a few passengers may have worked on the local dams, or fished there for leisure. The location was most significant in operational terms for watering engines and tying down brakes before a descent.

In 1916 a train passed a signal at danger near the station causing a collision that killed two people.

The line and the station first became part of the Great Western Railway (GWR) during the grouping of 1923, and then part of British Railways (BR) in 1948, following the nationalisation of the railways consequent upon the Transport Act 1947.

Torpantau closed to passengers in December 1962, but the line was retained for freight workings to Brecon until 4 May 1964. The route was subsequently abandoned, and the track lifted.

== Torpantau Tunnel ==
To the north of the station lies Torpantau Tunnel (also known as Beacons Tunnel), through the Beacons pass. The tunnel is 666 yards (609m) long, and the south-west portal (railway mileage 14miles-2¾ chains from Brecon station) was reached after a three-mile (5 km) ascent from the Merthyr side. Exiting from the tunnel (13 miles-52¼ chains from Brecon station) to the south-east, the line descended for 6¾ miles along the side of Glyn Collwyn (now flooded to form a reservoir) and on to the former Talybont-on-Usk station and River Usk at Talybont. Thence it climbed to Pennorth and Talyllyn junction and on to Brecon.

At an elevation of 1,313 feet (400 m), it was the highest standard gauge rail tunnel above sea level in regular use anywhere in Great Britain. Though access is discouraged, the tunnel remains accessible on foot. East and west portals of the tunnel are Grade II listed building.

== Re-opened station ==
From the late 1970s, the Brecon Mountain Railway (BMR) began relaying 2 ft-gauge track along the original railway route, northwards from Pant. The line re-opened to Pontsticill in 1980, and to Dolygaer in 1995. Re-laying continued, and the line reached Torpantau in December 2000. For operational and access reasons, Torpantau station was rebuilt slightly south of the original site, on the opposite side of the road. The nearby original station site is a popular start point for walks in the Brecon Beacons. It lies on the National Cycle Network NCR 8 (Taff Trail).

Due to motive power constraints on the steeply graded trackbed, the extended line from Dolygaer to Torpantau, a distance of 1mile-35chains, was used only by engineering trains from 2000 to 2014, whilst the BMR worked to restore a more powerful steam locomotive. Having achieved this aim, the extension to Torpantau became operational on 1 April 2014. Torpantau station reopened on that date, and is now the railway's northern terminus.

Preceding station	Heritage railways	Following station
Terminus	Brecon Mountain Railway	Pontsticill towards Pant
Disused railways
Pentir Rhiw; Line and station closed	Brecon and Merthyr Tydfil Junction Railway; Northern section	Dolygaer; Line and station closed
