= Brecon Mountain Railway =

Narrow gauge tourist railway on the south side of the Brecon Beacons

Coordinates: 51.8093°N 3.36731°W

Brecon Mountain Railway Rheilffordd Fynydd y Bannau
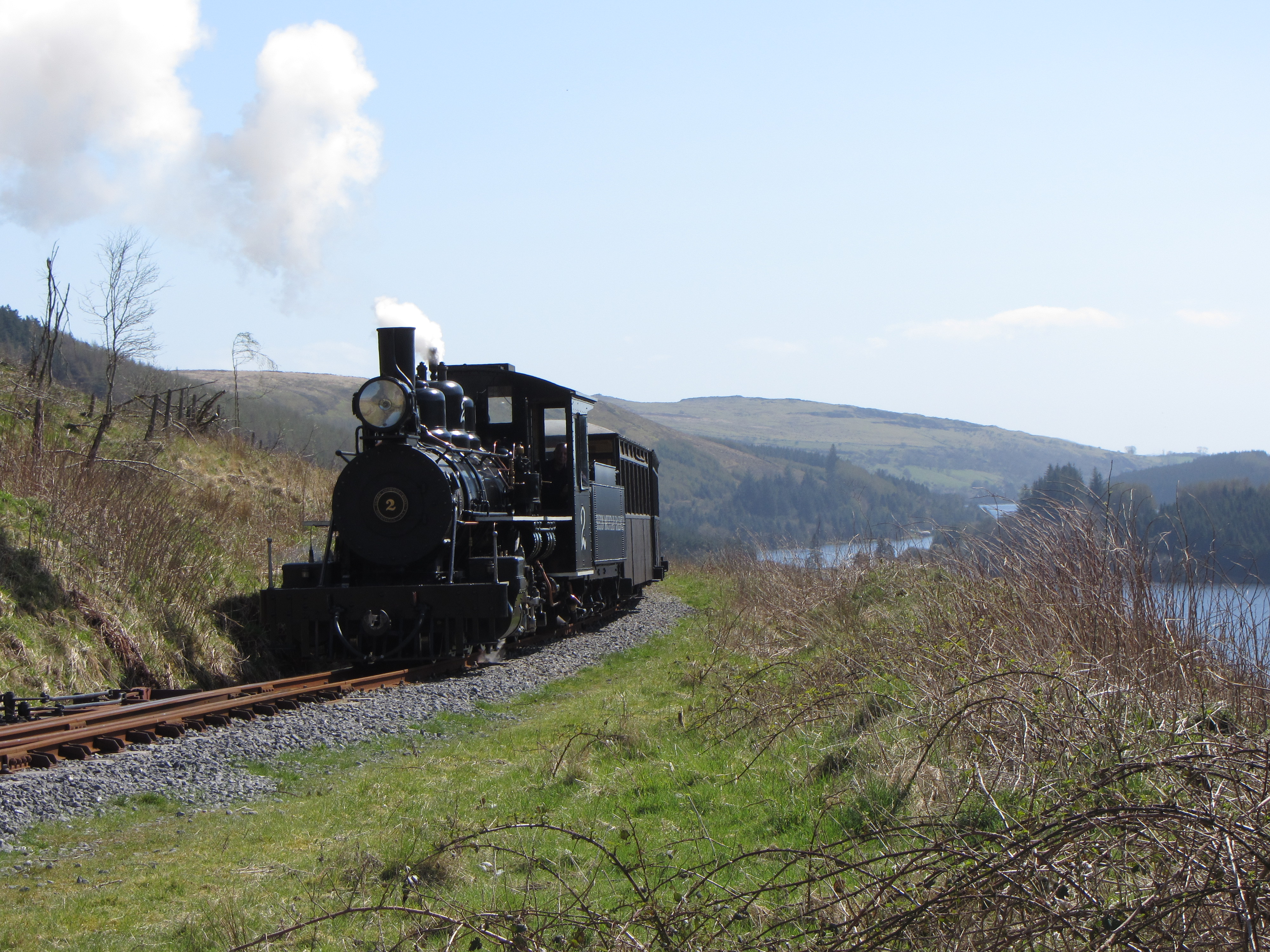
- Locomotive No 2 arrives at Torpantau Station.
- Locale: Merthyr Tydfil, Wales
- Terminus: Pant

Commercial operations
- Name: Brecon Mountain Railway
- Built by: Brecon and Merthyr Tydfil Junction Railway
- Original gauge: 4 ft 8 1/2 in (1,435 mm) standard gauge

Preserved operations
- Owned by: Vale of Rheidol Railway Ltd
- Operated by: Vale of Rheidol Railway Ltd
- Stations: 3
- Length: 5 miles (8.0 km)
- Preserved gauge: 1 ft 11 3/4 in (603 mm)

Commercial history
- Opened: 1980

Website
- www.bmr.wales

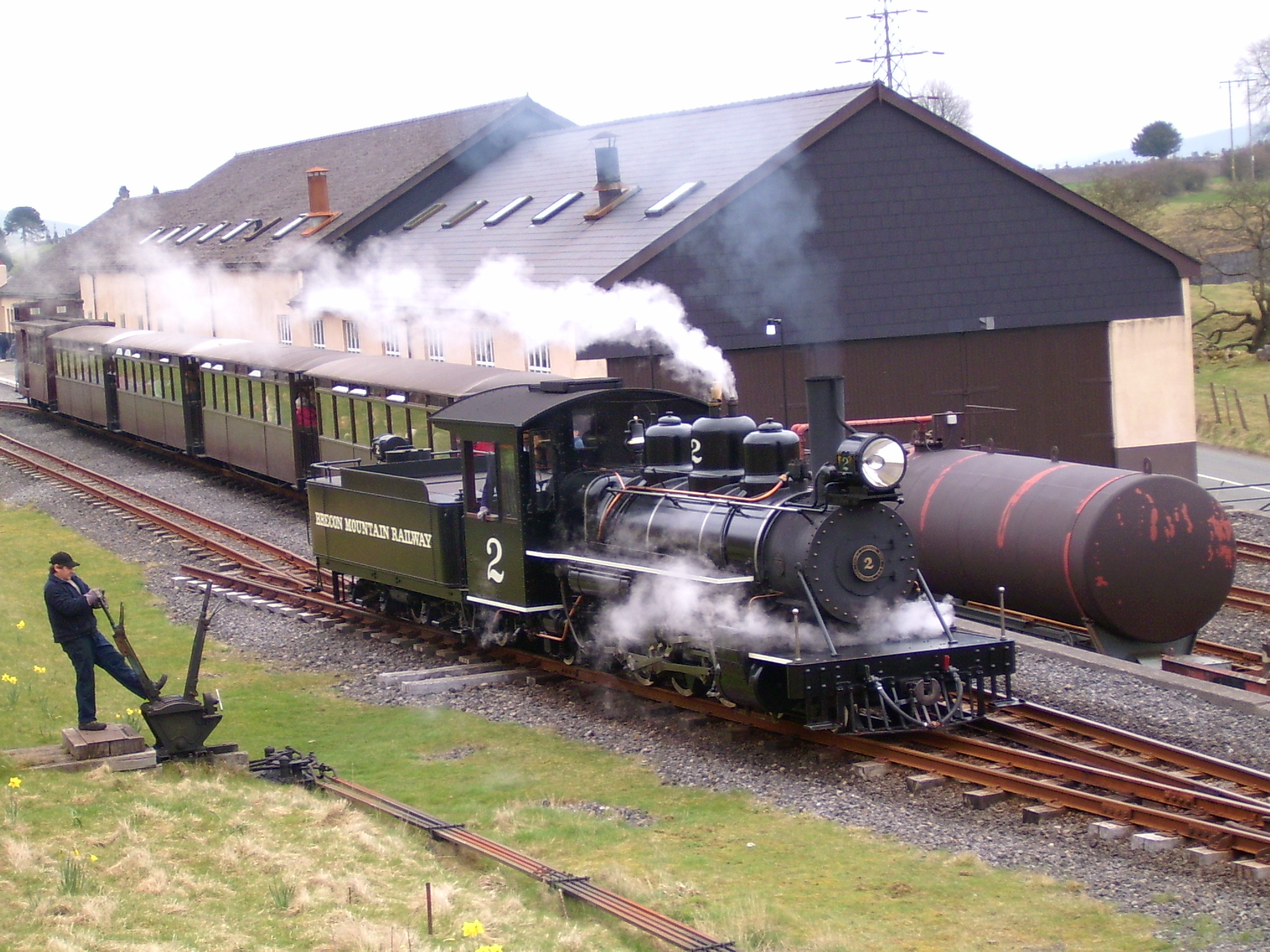
The American feel of the line is apparent from this photo of 1930 US-built Baldwin Pacific No. 2 on 11 April 2004.

The Brecon Mountain Railway (Welsh: Rheilffordd Fynydd y Bannau) is a 1 ft 11 3/4 in (603 mm) narrow gauge tourist railway on the south side of the Brecon Beacons in Wales. It climbs northwards from Pant along the full length of the Pontsticill Reservoir (also called 'Taf Fechan' reservoir by Welsh Water) and continues past the adjoining Pentwyn Reservoir to Torpantau railway station. The railway's starting point at Pant is located two miles (3 km) north of the town centre of Merthyr Tydfil.

== Route description ==
The line runs along part of the trackbed of the northern section of the former 4 ft 8 1/2 in (1,435 mm) standard gauge Brecon and Merthyr Railway from Pant to a new station at Torpantau, via Pontsticill and Dolygaer, a total of about 4.75 miles (8 km).

This takes the BMR just short of the southern entrance to the 667 yd (610 m) long Torpantau tunnel, the highest railway tunnel in Great Britain, which carried the original line through the hills along the side of Glyn Collwn to Brecon or to Moat Lane or Hereford via junctions at Talyllyn and Three Cocks.

One of the benefits of the line, and a condition of the planning permission, is that tourists can access and experience part of the Brecon Beacons National Park without driving their cars through it. Car parking for railway passengers is only available at Pant Station, outside the Brecon Beacons National Park.

The Brecon Mountain Railway is a member of the Great Little Trains of Wales.

== History ==
The Brecon Mountain Railway was founded in the mid-1970s, by Tony Hills (1937–2015). Hills was a long time railway enthusiast who by 1970, had established a base at Gilfach Ddu on the Llanberis Lake Railway where he stored the locomotives he purchased. In 1977, he purchased five miles of trackbed of the abandoned Brecon & Merthyr Railway at Pant and moved his collection there. Construction of the BMR started in 1978, with the grant of a light railway order, the Brecon Mountain Railway (Light Railway) Order 1980 (SI 1980/671) following. Track was laid between Pant and Pontsticill in 1979–80. At Pontsticill the station house was renovated, the old waiting room was converted into a small workshop and a storage shed was built. Seven bridges were repaired or replaced. The railway opened to passengers in June 1980 using the engine Sybil and one carriage.

Between 1982 and 1996, a large station and workshop were built at Pant. These provide passenger facilities including toilets, cafe, shop and booking office as well as the extensive workshop used to build and maintain the railway locomotives, carriages and wagons.

A 1 1/2 miles (2.4 km) extension from Pontsticill to Dol-y-Gaer opened in 1995. The railway was further extended to Torpantau, just short of the southern entrance of the Torpantau Tunnel, with passenger services commencing 1 April 2014.

By 2016, the original waiting room building at Pontsticill, which had served as a workshop for a period, was converted into a steam museum housing various stationary steam engines and three of the smaller locomotives. All of the stationary units were connected up to a steam distribution header and boiler, which in 2017 was still awaiting commissioning.

In 1988, the Brecon Mountain Railway purchased the Vale of Rheidol Railway when the line was put up for sale by British Rail. Both lines operated under unified management until 1996, when a decision was made to establish them as separate businesses.

In 2023, the Vale of Rheidol announced it was in negotiation to acquire the Brecon Mountain Railway re-establishing the previous partnership. The merger was completed in November 2026.

== Stations ==
- Pant – southern terminus of the BMR.
- Pontsticill – at the southern end of the Pontsticill reservoir.
- Dolygaer – station closed, but run round loop in use.
- Torpantau – current northern terminus of the BMR.

== Locomotives ==
Full list of locomotives at the site:

Image	Builder	Works No.	Date	Type	Name or Number	Status	Notes
	Steam Locomotives						
	Baldwin	15511	1897	2-6-2	1	Operational	Acquired 2002. Restored to full working order in 2019 and named Santa Teresa
	Baldwin	61269	1930	4-6-2	2	Operational	Originally built for the Eastern Province Cement Company in Port Elizabeth, South Africa. Acquired by the Brecon Mountain Railway around 1990, and restored to full working order in 1997.
	Locomotives Under Construction						
	Baldwin / BMR			2-6-2	3	Under construction	Working from original drawings of former Sandy River and Rangeley Lakes Railroad locomotive 23 (works number 40733) of 1913.
	Baldwin / BMR			2-4-4T	4	Under construction	Working from original drawings of former Sandy River and Rangeley Lakes Railroad locomotive 10 (works number 42231) of 1916.
	Diesel Locomotives						
	BMR	001	1987	0-6-0DH		Operational	Constructed at the railway.
	Kambarka	TU7-1698	1981	4w-4wDH		Operational	Acquired from a Peat Railway at Seda, Latvia.
	Kambarka	706.951	1985	4w-4wDH		Spares Donor	Acquired from the Tatra Electric Railway, Slovakia.
	Former Locomotives						
	Hunslet Engine Co.	827	1903	0-4-0ST	Sybil	Operational	The railway's original locomotive. Sold to the Richmond Light Railway in Kent in 2021.
	Jung	1261	1908	0-6-2WTT	Graf Schwerin-Löwitz; 99 3553	Museum Display	Due to lower power, required assistance if operating beyond Dolygaer. Now on display at the Vale of Rheidol Railway.
	De Winton		1894	0-4-0VB	Pendyffryn	Museum Display	Restored at BMR. Now on display at the Vale of Rheidol Railway.
	Redstone		1905	0-4-0VBT		Museum Display	Restored at BMR. Now on display at the Vale of Rheidol Railway.

== See also ==
- British narrow gauge railways
- List of British heritage and private railways
- List of closed railway lines in Great Britain
