= Dowlais Central railway station =

Disused railway station in Dowlais, Merthyr Tydfil

Coordinates: 51.7630°N 3.3557°W

Dowlais Central

General information
- Location: Dowlais, Glamorgan; Wales
- Platforms: 3

Other information
- Status: Disused

History
- Original company: Brecon and Merthyr Tydfil Junction Railway
- Pre-grouping: Brecon and Merthyr Tydfil Junction Railway
- Post-grouping: Great Western Railway

Key dates
- 23 June 1869: Opened as Dowlais
- 1 July 1924: Name changed to Dowlais Central
- September 1939: Services suspended
- December 1940: Services resumed
- 2 May 1960: Closed to advertised trains
- 6 May 1960: Closed permanently
Location

Dowlais Central railway station served the village of Dowlais, Glamorgan, Wales, from 1869 to 1960 on the Brecon and Merthyr Tydfil Junction Railway.

== History ==
The station opened as Dowlais on 23 June 1869 by the Brecon and Merthyr Tydfil Junction Railway. Its name was changed to Dowlais Central on 1 July 1924. Services were suspended in September 1939 but they resumed in December 1940. It was advertised as a workman's station but still continued to carry passengers. It closed to commercial services on 2 May 1960 and the last unadvertised train called here on 6 May 1960. As in 2024 the booking office and goods shed now form part of the Dowlais Leisure Centre.

| Preceding station | Disused railways | Following station |
|---|---|---|
| Pantysgallog (High Level) Halt; Line and station closed | Brecon and Merthyr Tydfil Junction Railway; Northern section | Terminus |
| Dowlais (High Street); Line and station closed | London and North Western Railway | Terminus |
