= Vaynor =

Village and community in Merthyr Tydfil County Borough in Wales

Coordinates: 51.78325°N 3.38002°W

- Village and community
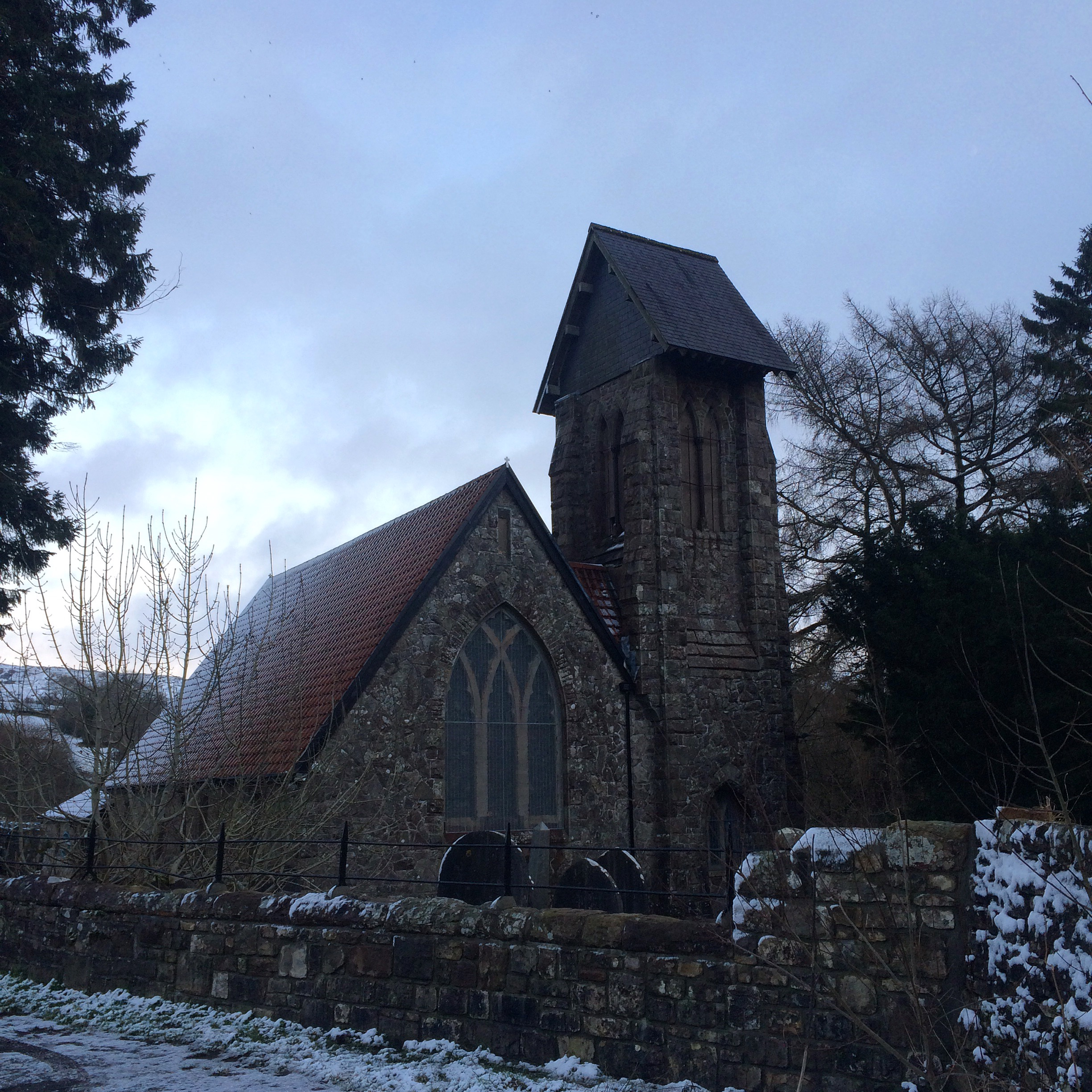
- Saint Gwynno's Church, Vaynor

- Location within Merthyr Tydfil
- Principal area: Merthyr Tydfil
- Country: Wales
- Sovereign state: United Kingdom
- Police: South Wales
- Fire: South Wales
- Ambulance: Welsh
- List of places UK Wales Merthyr Tydfil Map of the community

Vaynor (Welsh: Y Faenor, 'the Manor') is a village and community (formerly a parish) in Merthyr Tydfil County Borough in Wales, United Kingdom. The population of the community at the 2011 census was 3,551.

== Location ==
It is about four miles north of the town of Merthyr Tydfil and is within the borders of the Brecon Beacons National Park.

The community includes the three villages of Cefn-coed-y-cymmer, Trefechan and Pontsticill as well as Pontsarn and Vaynor. To the west are Nant Glais Caves. It also includes the southern section of Pontsticill Reservoir and the eastern end of Llwyn-On Reservoir.

== History ==
Until 1974, the village was a civil parish in the Vaynor and Penderyn Rural District of Brecknockshire. From 1974 to 1996, it was part of Merthyr Tydfil district in Mid Glamorgan. It is notable for its connections with the Ironmaster Robert Crawshay, owner of the world's first ironworks at Cyfarthfa, who is buried in Vaynor churchyard.

== Governance ==
Between 1973 and 1996 Vaynor was an electoral ward to Merthyr Tydfil District Council, initially electing three district councillors. Subsequently, Vaynor became a ward to Merthyr Tydfil County Borough Council, electing two (generally Independent) county councillors.

== See also ==
- Quarries of Vaynor
