= Pontsticill Reservoir =

Reservoir in Merthyr Tydfil, Wales

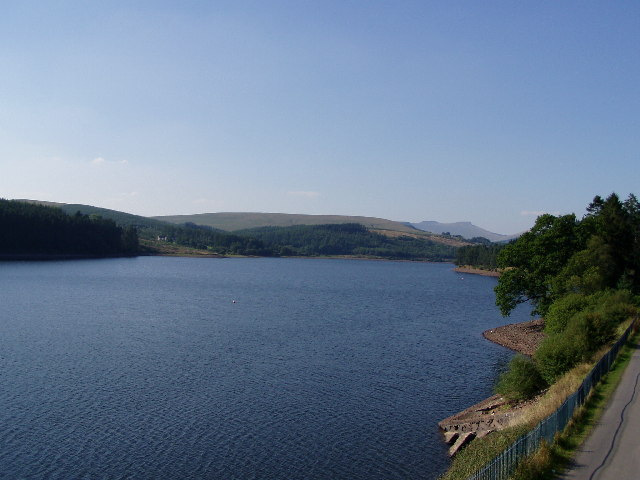

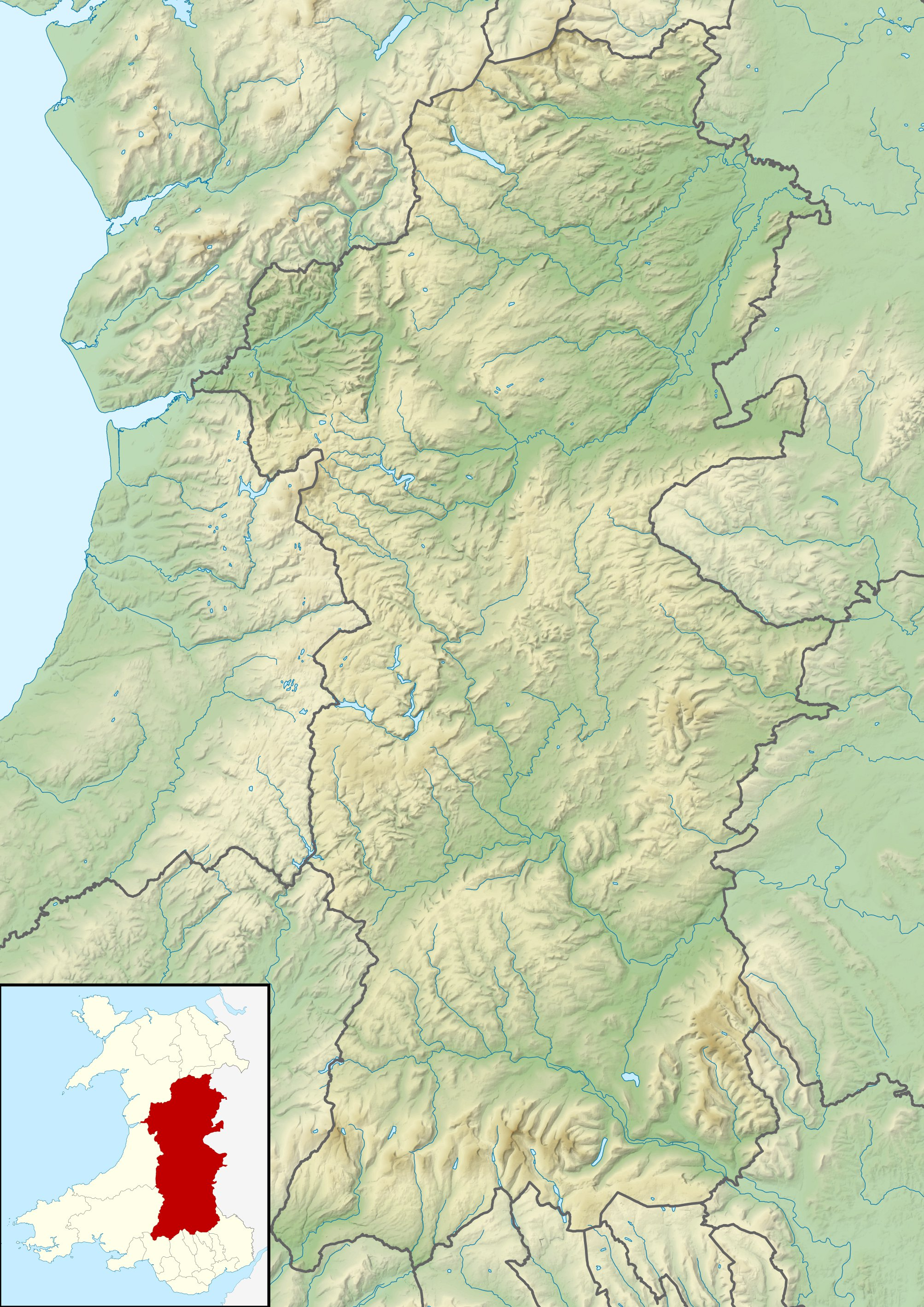
- Location within Powys
- Location: Taf Fechan
- Coordinates: 51°48′56″N 3°22′17″W
- Lake type: reservoir
- Basin countries: United Kingdom
- Surface area: 102 ha (250 acres)
- Max. depth: 30 m (98 ft)
- Surface elevation: 330 m (1,080 ft)

Pontsticill Reservoir (Welsh: Cronfa Pontsticill) or Taf Fechan Reservoir is a large reservoir on the Taf Fechan lying partly in the county of Powys and partly within the county borough of Merthyr Tydfil in south Wales. It lies within the Brecon Beacons National Park and Fforest Fawr Geopark.

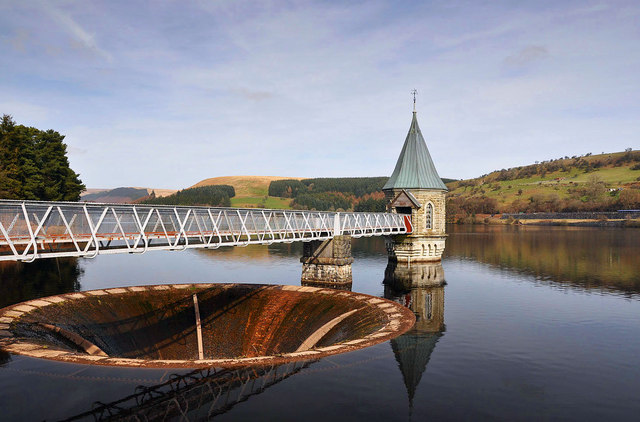
Bell-mouth spillway and valve tower

The 110 ft high embankment has, since its completion in 1927, been holding back 15,400 megalitres of water for supply to industry and population to the south. At maximum fill level, the modern reservoir is continuous with Pentwyn Reservoir (sometimes referred to as Dol-y-gaer Reservoir or Lake) which suffered major water losses after completion due to the presence of major fractures in the bedrock beneath its dam relating to the Neath Disturbance, a major geological fault which runs northeast to southwest through the area.

The reservoir is popular with sailors, anglers and picnickers. The Taff Trail runs through the woods on the western side of the reservoir whilst Merthyr Tydfil sailing club is based on the eastern bank. The Brecon Mountain Railway is a heritage steam railway which runs on the route of the former Brecon and Merthyr Railway up the eastern side of the reservoir from Pant Station to Dolygaer and, since 1 April 2014, on to Torpantau, the line's summit.

Most of the banks of the reservoir have been heavily afforested by Welsh Water though management of these woods is undertaken by Natural Resources Wales on behalf of the company.

Part of the 2010 film Submarine was filmed on the reservoir walkway.

The Reservoir's bell-mouth spillway (also known as plug hole) featured prominently in the opening scenes of the BBC’s 2021 television drama entitled The Pact, as well as in the final episode of the series.
