= Chacewater, Kenwyn and Baldhu (electoral division) =

Former electoral division of Cornwall in the UK

- Former ward Cornwall Council
- Boundary of Chacewater, Kenwyn and Baldhu in Cornwall from 2013-2021.
- County: Cornwall

2013–2021
- Number of councillors: One
- Replaced by: Gloweth, Malabar and Shortlanesend; Threemilestone and Chacewater; Feock and Kea
- Created from: Chacewater and Kenwyn; Feock and Kea
- Number of councillors: One

Chacewater, Kenwyn and Baldhu was an electoral division of Cornwall in the United Kingdom which returned one member to sit on Cornwall Council between 2013 and 2021. It was abolished at the 2021 local elections, being succeeded by Gloweth, Malabar and Shortlanesend, Threemilestone and Chacewater and Feock and Kea.

== Councillors ==
Election	Member	Party
2013	John Dyer	Conservative
2017	John Dyer	Conservative
2021	Seat abolished	

== Extent ==
The division represented Shortlanesend, Saveock, Chacewater, Twelveheads, Baldhu, Kea and parts of Kenwyn, covering 5030 hectares in total.

== Election results ==
=== 2017 election ===
2017 election: Chacewater, Kenwyn & Baldhu
Party	Candidate	Votes	%	±%
Conservative	John Dyer	674	57.9	▲5.7
Liberal Democrats	Ingrid Quaife	301	25.9	N/A
Green	Julie Bennett	183	15.7	N/A
Majority		373	32.0	▲5.6
Rejected ballots		6	0.5	▲0.3
Turnout		1164	37.7	▲3.9
Conservative hold		Swing		

=== 2013 election ===
2013 election: Chacewater, Kenwyn & Baldhu
Party	Candidate	Votes	%	±%
Conservative	John Dyer	534	52.2	N/A
Independent	Ross Treseder	264	25.8	N/A
UKIP	Michael Warren	146	14.3	N/A
Labour	Peggy Wicks	77	7.5	N/A
Majority		270	26.4	N/A
Rejected ballots		2	0.2	N/A
Turnout		1023	33.8	N/A
Conservative win (new seat)				
