= List of rivers in Cornwall =

The county of Cornwall, located in southwest England in the United Kingdom, contains numerous small rivers and streams. The border between Cornwall and the neighbouring county of Devon is mostly the River Tamar.

== List ==
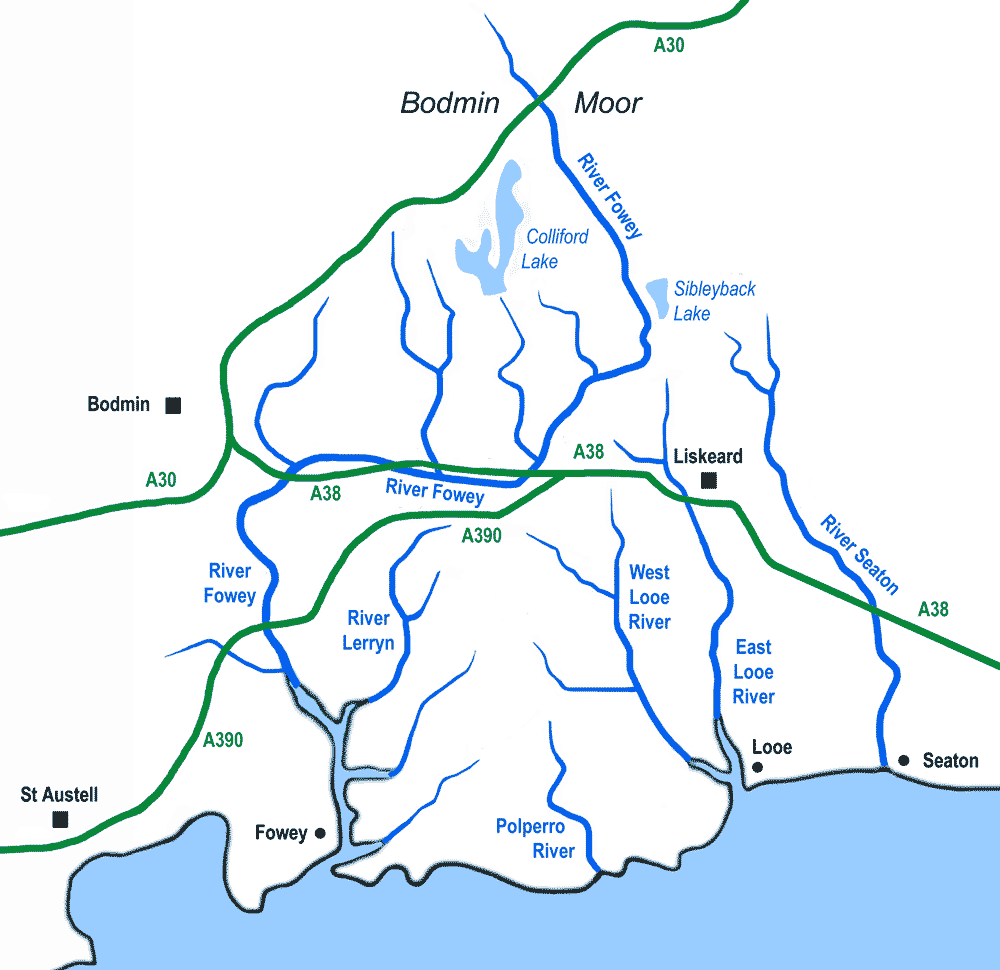
Sketchmap of rivers of southeast Cornwall

Name	Length	Source	Mouth	Photo
River Allen		St Allen	River Truro	
River Allen		Camelford	River Camel	
River Camel	74 km (46 mi)	Bodmin Moor	Padstow Bay	
River Caerhay	13 km (8.1 mi)		English Channel	
Carnon River		Chacewater	English Channel	
River Cober		Nine Maidens Downs	The Loe	
De Lank River	9 mi (14 km)	Bodmin Moor	River Camel	
River Fal	29 km (18 mi)	Goss Moor	English Channel	
River Fowey	40 km (25 mi)	Bodmin Moor	English Channel	
River Gannel	13 km (8.1 mi)	Carland Cross	Atlantic Ocean	
Gover Stream	3 km (1.9 mi)		St Austell River	
Hamoaze			Plymouth Sound	
River Hayle	12 mi (19 km)	Crowan	Atlantic Ocean	
Helford River	50 km (31 mi)		English Channel	
River Inny	20 mi (32 km)	Davidstow	River Tamar	
River Kensey		Treneglos	River Tamar	
Lerryn River		Bodmin Moor	River Fowey	
River Looe	40.1 km (24.9 mi)		English Channel	
River Lynher	34 km (21 mi)	Bodmin Moor	Hamoaze	
Marsland Water			Atlantic Ocean	
River Menalhyl	12 mi (19 km)	Nine Maidens stone row	Atlantic Ocean	
Mylor Creek				
River Ottery	33 km (21 mi)	Otterham	River Tamar	
Par River			St Austell Bay	
Penpol Creek			River Fowey	
Penpont Water			River Inny	
Percuil River	11 km (6.8 mi)	Treworlas	Falmouth Bay	
River Pol	6.4 km (4.0 mi)	Pelynt	Atlantic Ocean	
Pont Pill			River Fowey	
Port Navas Creek	1 km (0.62 mi)		Helford River	
Red River		Towednack	English Channel	
Red River	8 mi (13 km)	Bolenowe	Atlantic Ocean	
Restronguet Creek	2 mi (3.2 km)		River Fal	
St Austell River	20.8 km (12.9 mi)		English Channel	
River Seaton	11 mi (18 km)	Caradon Hill	English Channel	
River Strat	12.7 mi (20.4 km)	Kilkhampton	Atlantic Ocean	
River Tamar	98 km (61 mi)		Hamoaze	
River Tiddy		Pensilva	River Lynher	
Trevillet River			Atlantic Ocean	
River Truro			River Fal	
River Valency	8.3 km (5.2 mi)	Otterham	Atlantic Ocean	
River Warleggan			River Fowey	
