= Killifreth Mine =

Disused mine in Cornwall, England

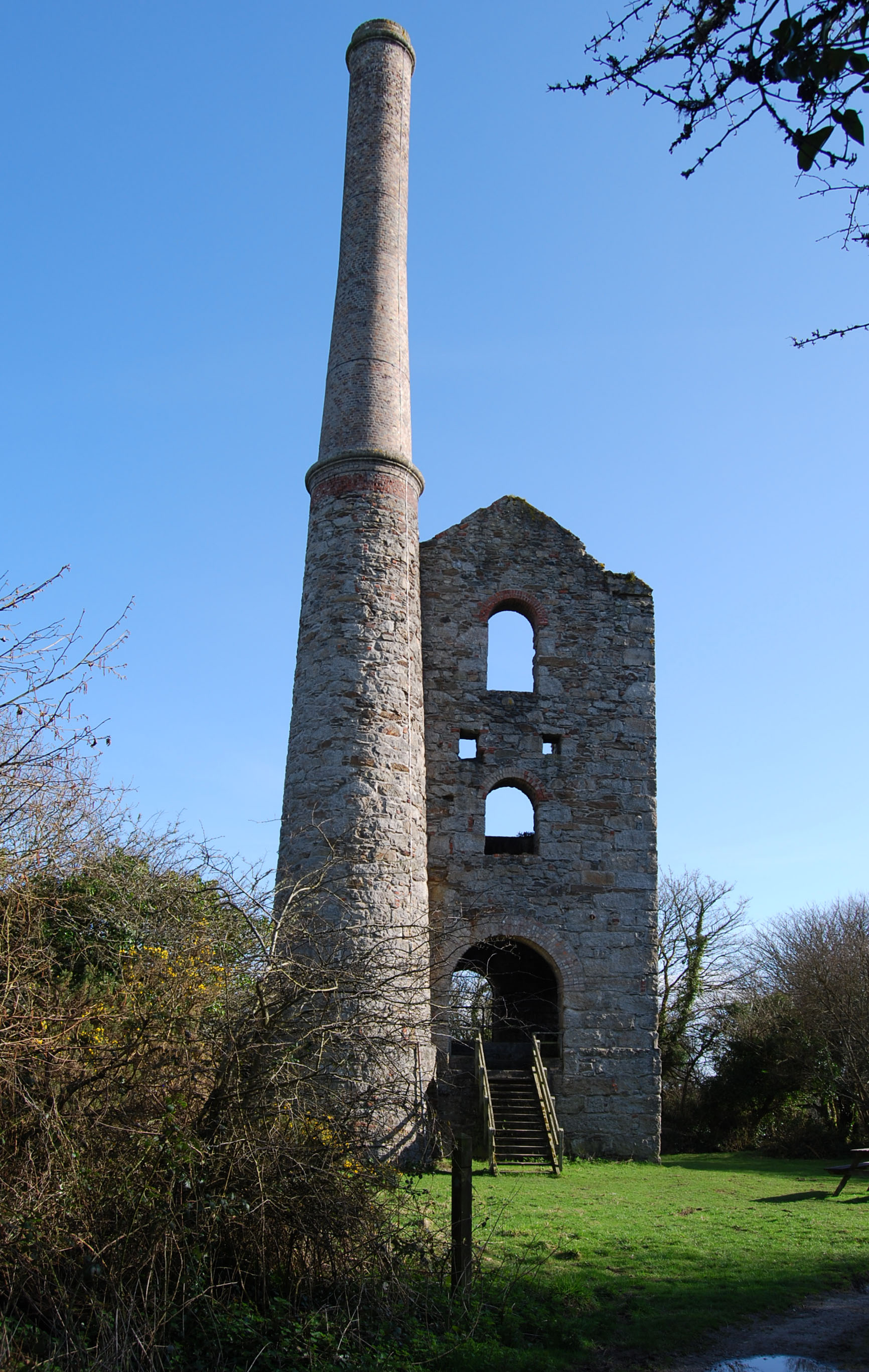
- The engine house at Hawke's Shaft, viewed from the north

- Location within Cornwall
- 50°15′14.7″N 5°10′49.1″W
- Location: Chacewater, Cornwall, England
- OS grid reference: SW 733 442

Listed Building – Grade II
- Official name: Engine House Killifreth (Hawke's Shaft) at SW 733442
- Designated: 30 May 1967
- Reference no.: 1140971

Listed Building – Grade II
- Official name: Engine house at approx 50m west of Wheal Bush Farmhouse, Killifreth Mine
- Designated: 3 May 1967
- Reference no.: 1140974

Listed Building – Grade II
- Official name: Engine house at approx 50m north west of Wheal Bush Farmhouse, Killifreth Mine
- Designated: 30 May 1967
- Reference no.: 1140973

Listed Building – Grade II
- Official name: Engine house, part of Killifreth Mine, at SW 737442
- Designated: 3 February 1986
- Reference no.: 1328985

Listed Building – Grade II
- Official name: Engine house and boiler house and workshop ruins at Engine Shaft, part of Killifreth Mine, at SW 736442
- Designated: 3 February 1986
- Reference no.: 1140972

Listed Building – Grade II
- Official name: Mine chimney, part of Killifreth Mine, at SW 737443
- Designated: 3 February 1986
- Reference no.: 1140926

Killifreth Mine was a mine near Chacewater in Cornwall, England, producing at various periods copper, tin and arsenic. The engine house over Hawke's Shaft is a Grade II listed building; it has the tallest surviving chimney in Cornwall.

== History ==
The mine produced copper from shallow workings from 1826 to 1860. Some time before 1856 the mine was joined to the Great County Adit, a branch coming from Wheal Busy. In 1864 it was bought by a new company, and tin was mined; it was deepened to 100 fathoms below the County Adit.

The engine house over Hawke's Shaft (named after Edward Hawke Jnr, the purser in 1865) was built in 1892, and housed an 80-inch pumping engine. The bob (the beam of the beam engine) broke in 1897, and the mine was abandoned for a period.

It was reopened in 1912, mining for arsenic. A new boiler house contained four boilers; these served an 85-inch pumping engine, a horizontal whim and an air compressor. The chimney was augmented to its present height. The price of arsenic was volatile, and the mine failed after a few years. Although there was an attempt to open the mine in 1927, no further mining took place.

== Description ==
The engine house at Hawke's Shaft is made of granite rubble and killas. It had three storeys; the walls are virtually intact. The thicker bob wall, on the south side, survives up to the wall plate, that supported the beam of the beam engine; above was originally timber framed with weather boarding. The chimney is the tallest surviving in Cornwall.

Another engine house of Killifreth Mine is to the east at Engine Shaft, grid reference SW 736 442: there are ruins of a late 19th-century engine house, attached chimney and boiler house.

== See also ==
- Mining in Cornwall and Devon
- Cornwall and West Devon Mining Landscape
