= Gloweth, Malabar and Shortlanesend (electoral division) =

Electoral division of Cornwall in the UK

- ward Cornwall Council
- Boundary of Gloweth, Malabar and Shortlanesend in Cornwall from 2021.
- County: Cornwall

Current ward
- Created: 2021
- Councillor: Karen Margaret La Borde (Green)
- Number of councillors: One
- Created from: Chacewater, Kenwyn and Baldhu; Truro Trehaverne

Gloweth, Malabar and Shortlanesend is an electoral division of Cornwall in the United Kingdom which returns one member to sit on Cornwall Council. It was created at the 2021 local elections, being created from the former divisions of Chacewater, Kenwyn and Baldhu, and Truro Trehaverne. The current councillor is Karen Margaret La Borde of the Green Party.

== Boundaries ==
Gloweth, Malabar and Shortlanesend represents the eastern portion of the parish of Kenwyn, which includes the hamlets of Allet and Idless, the housing estate of Gloweth, and the village of Shortlanesend. The electoral division also represents the western outskirts of the city of Truro.

== Councillors ==
Election	Member	Party
2021	David Harris	Conservative
2025	Karen Margaret La Borde	Green

== Election results ==
=== 2025 election ===
2025 Cornwall Council election: Gloweth, Malabar and Shortlanesend
Party	Candidate	Votes	%	±%
Green	Karen Margaret La Borde	451	34.7	+26.3
Reform UK	Alan Conway	383	29.5	New
Liberal Democrats	Joe Taylor	268	20.6	+7.1
Conservative	Jonathan Geach	109	8.4	−25.8
Labour	Joel Robert Briant	79	6.1	−12.4
TUSC	Trevor Arthur Hall	9	0.7	−1.2
Majority		68	5.2	−5.5
Rejected ballots		1	0.1	
Turnout		1,300		
Green gain from Conservative				

=== 2021 election ===
2021 Cornwall Council election: Gloweth, Malabar and Shortlanesend
Party	Candidate	Votes	%	±%
Conservative	David Harris (Note: Incumbent councillor, formerly representing Truro Trehaverne)	437	34.2	N/A
Independent	Sam Rabey	300	23.5	N/A
Labour	Brian Kelly	236	18.5	N/A
Liberal Democrats	Rod Pascoe	172	13.5	N/A
Green	Nigel Unwin	107	8.4	N/A
TUSC	Trevor Hall	24	1.9	N/A
Majority		137	10.7	N/A
Rejected ballots		5	0.4	N/A
Turnout		1,281		N/A
Conservative win (new seat)				
