= Creegbrawse =

Hamlet in Cornwall, England

Coordinates: 50.248°N 5.164°W

Creegbrawse: Cornish: Krugbras
- Location within Cornwall
- OS grid reference: SW7450943496
- Civil parish: Kenwyn
- Unitary authority: Cornwall
- Ceremonial county: Cornwall
- Region: South West
- Country: England
- Sovereign state: United Kingdom
- Post town: TRURO
- Postcode district: TR4
- Dialling code: 01209
- Police: Devon and Cornwall
- Fire: Cornwall
- Ambulance: South Western
- UK Parliament: Truro and Falmouth

Creegbrawse is a hamlet in west Cornwall, England, United Kingdom. It is situated between the villages of Chacewater (where the 2011 census population was included ) and Todpool approximately three miles (5 km) east of Redruth.

Creegbrawse was a busy mining area in the 19th century. Remains of the mining activity are still present including numerous mineshafts. Since the decline of the industry, the village has become a rural community with a crossroads at its centre; the roads lead to Chacewater, Twelveheads, Todpool and St Day via Little Beside.
