= Greenbottom, Cornwall =

Coordinates: 50.2631581°N 5.1350527°W

Greenbottom
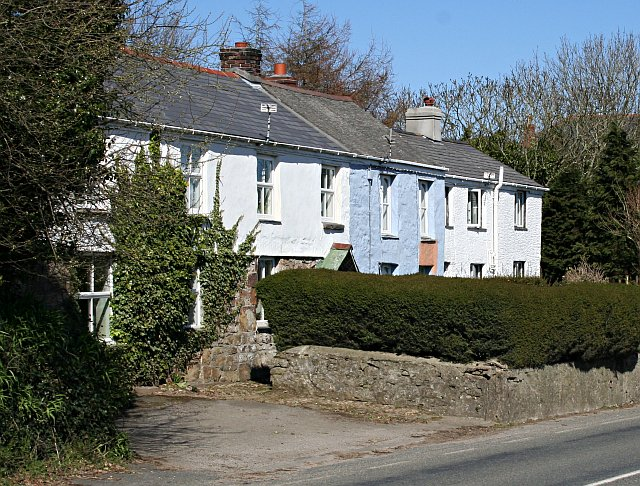
- A row of terraced houses in Greenbottom.

- Location within Cornwall
- OS grid reference: SW7645
- Civil parish: Kenwyn
- Unitary authority: Cornwall
- Ceremonial county: Cornwall
- Region: South West
- Country: England
- Sovereign state: United Kingdom
- Post town: Truro
- Postcode district: TR4
- Dialling code: 01872

Greenbottom is a hamlet in the parish of Kenwyn in Cornwall, England, United Kingdom. Greenbottom is located on the Penstraze Moor between Saveock Water and Threemilestone, near the A390. It is situated south east of Penstraze.
