= Billy Bray's Three Eye Chapel =

Chapel in Kea, Cornwall, England

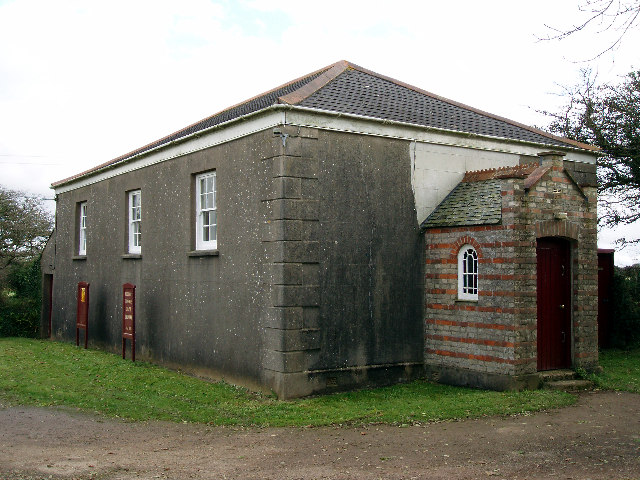

- Location within Cornwall
- 50.2509°N 5.1366°W
- Location: Baldhu, Kea, Cornwall, England

Listed Building – Grade II
- Official name: Billy Bray's Three Eye Chapel
- Designated: 12 March 1986
- Reference no.: 1159452

Billy Bray's Three Eye Chapel is a Grade II listed Methodist chapel near Baldhu, in the civil parish of Kea, in Cornwall, UK. The chapel is one of the three chapels left that Billy Bray built. The chapel is located about five miles from Truro and one mile from Chacewater near a crossroads. The chapel was built in the early 19th century and was attended by many people including Billy Bray himself who was the preacher here. Towards the end of the 1980s the chapel closed down but was reopened and rededicated. Services are still held in the chapel.

The door and the porch were originally under the middle window but were moved and altered. It is thought the chapel has also been altered since Billy Bray was here. The name 'three eyes' comes from the three windows of the chapel. Three on one side and three on the other. Billy Bray is buried at St Michael's church in Baldhu which has been turned into houses.

The church contains a piano and the shell of a harmonium.
