= Twelveheads Press =

Formdr publishing company in Cornwall, England

- Founded: 1977
- Founder: Michael Messenger; John Stengelhofen
- Defunct: 2022
- Country of origin: United Kingdom
- Headquarters location: Chacewater near Truro, Cornwall, England
- Nonfiction topics: Cornish heritage, mining history, railway history, maritime history

Twelveheads Press (1977–2020) was an independent publishing company based in Chacewater near Truro, Cornwall, England. Best known for their Cornish Heritage series but also well known by scholars and enthusiasts for their transport and mining books, the firm took its name from the nearby hamlet of Twelveheads.

== History and philosophy ==
Founded by Michael Messenger and John Stengelhofen in 1977, they produced high-quality books for over forty years. Their specialist books included topics such as maritime, mining and railway history, and mostly covered the areas of Cornwall and Southwest Britain. In 1988, Messenger and Stengelhofen were joined by Alan Kittridge and all three contributed significantly to their titles.

Stengelhofen died in 2020 and it was decided to cease trading from the end of 2022.

Messenger stated:

"Twelveheads Press is not a conventional publishing house in the usual sense, but three friends who publish subjects that interest us. Our knowledge ensures that the books are authentic and accurate. Whilst we try not to lose money on books because we do not rely on Twelveheads Press for our living we can afford to reject manuscripts that are not to the standards we want and expect. It is only the support of the reading public that has kept us in business for over 30 years."

== Titles for Cornwall County Council ==
The following titles were produced by Historic Environment Service (formerly Cornwall Archaeological Unit) for Cornwall County Council

- Scilly's Archaeological Heritage
- Cornwall's Archaeological Heritage
- Cornwall's China Clay Heritage

== Railway titles ==
Twelveheads titles focus on studies of railways in Cornwall, Devon and Wales.

- The Pentewan Railway
- Rail & Sail to Pentewan
- Weston Clevedon & Portishead Railway
- Slate Quarry Railways of Gwynedd
- The Struggle for the Cornwall Railway
- North Devon Clay
- Industrial Railways of the South West
- The Redlake Tramway & China Clay Works E. A. Wade
- Caradon & Looe : The Canal, Railways and Mines
- Brunel's Royal Albert Bridge
- The Lee Moor Tramway
- The Plynlimon and Hafan Tramway E. A. Wade
- Devonport Dockyard Railway
- The Culm Valley Light Railway
- The Mont Cenis Fell Railway
- Inclined Planes in the South West
- The Bodmin & Wadebridge Railway
- Fayle's Tramways
- The Furzebrook Railway
- The Snailbeach District Railways
- Steam South & West

== Maritime titles ==
- Ships & Shipbuilders of a West Country Seaport
- Passenger Steamers of the River Tamar
- Passenger Steamers of the River Dart
- Passenger Steamers of the Bristol Channel
- Passenger Steamers of the Glasgow & South Western Railway
- Railway Ships & Packet Ports
- T. R. Brown of Bristol
- Cosens of Weymouth; 1918 to 1996
- White Funnel Magic
- Lundy Packets
- Steamers & Ferries of the River Tamar & Three Towns District
- Passenger Steamers of the River Fal
- Douglas Head Ferry & the Port Soderick Boats
- Plymouth; Ocean Liner Port of Call
- Tacky's Tugs
- Rendel's Floating Bridges
- Bishop Rock Lighthouse
- Longships Lighthouse
- Godrevy Light
- Hevva
- Paddle Steamer Kingswear Castle

== Mining and quarrying titles ==
- Stannary Tales
- Mines and Mining Men of Menheniot
- Mines of Cornwall & Devon
- Quarries of England & Wales
- Tin Streams of Wendron
- South West Stone Quarries
- The Kalmeter Journal - Henric Kalmeter (1693-1750) made this journal on a visit to Cornwall, Devon and Somerset in 1724-25. It was translated from the Swedish by Justin Brooke.

== Other titles ==
- Cornish Milestones
- Dartmoor's Earliest Photographs
- Called Home

== Heritage Series ==
- Cornwall's Archaeological Heritage
- Cornwall's Bridge & Viaduct Heritage
- Cornwall's Butterfly & Moth Heritage
- Cornwall's Churchyard Heritage
- Cornwall's China Clay Heritage
- Cornwall's Communications Heritage
- Cornwall's Geological Heritage
- Cornwall's Industrial Heritage
- Cornwall's Lifeboat Heritage
- Cornwall's Lighthouse Heritage
- Cornwall's Literary Heritage
- Cornwall's Maritime Heritage
- Cornwall's Mining Heritage
- Cornwall's Railway Heritage
- Scilly's Archaeological Heritage
- Scilly's Building Heritage
- Scilly's Wildlife Heritage
- Dorset's Industrial Heritage
- Devon's Lifeboat Heritage

== Standard Book Number ==
The Twelveheads Press has the following 13-digit ISBN code: 978 0 906294 (followed by xxx y)

== See also ==
- List of publishing companies
