= Threemilestone and Chacewater =

Electoral ward in Cornwall, England

- ward Cornwall Council
- Boundary of Threemilestone and Chacewater in Cornwall from 2021–-present.
- County: Cornwall

Current ward
- Created: 2021
- Councillor: Dulcie Tudor (Independent)
- Number of councillors: One
- Created from: Chacewater, Kenwyn and Baldhu; Threemilestone and Gloweth

Threemilestone and Chacewater is an electoral division of Cornwall in the United Kingdom which returns one member to sit on Cornwall Council. It was created at the 2021 local elections, being formed from the former divisions of Chacewater, Kenwyn and Baldhu; and Threemilestone and Gloweth. It contains the villages of Chacewater and Threemilestone.

The current councillor is Dulcie Tudor, an Independent politician who was previously the councillor for Threemilestone and Gloweth.

== Election results ==
=== 2021 election ===
2021 election: Threemilestone and Chacewater
Party	Candidate	Votes	%	±%
Independent	Dulcie Tudor	650	37.7	
Conservative	John Dwyer	529	30.7	
Green	Karen La Borde	492	28.6	
Liberal Democrats	Edward Penrose	48	2.8	
Majority		650	37.7	
Rejected ballots		4	0.2	
Turnout		1723	44.6	
Registered electors		3860		
Independent win (new seat)				

=== 2025 election ===
2025 election: Threemilestone and Chacewater
Party	Candidate	Votes	%	±%
Independent	Dulcie Tudor	543	36.3	−1.4
Reform	Paul Whitehouse	440	29.4	New
Liberal Democrats	Tony Martin	187	12.5	+9.7
Conservative	Christopher James Blackler Murphy	140	9.4	−21.3
Green	Cy Matthias Marven	100	6.7	−21.9
Labour	Louise Dianne Coley	85	5.7	New
Majority		103	6.9	−0.1
Rejected ballots		2	0.1	-0.1
Turnout		1497	38.6	−6.0
Registered electors		3,875		
Independent hold				
