= Kerley Downs =

Coordinates: 50.253°N 5.144°W

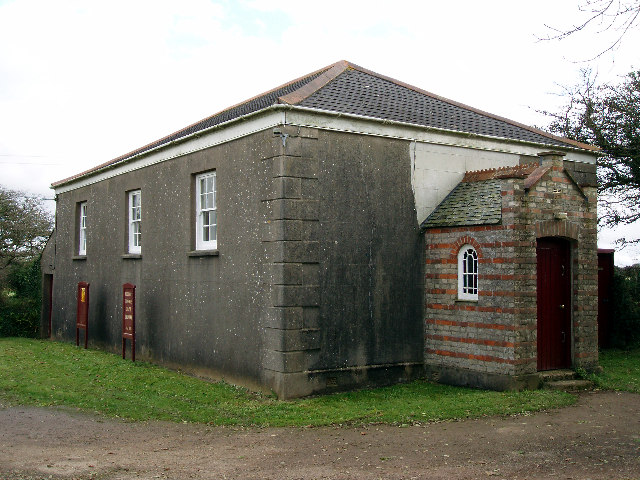
Billy Bray's 'Three eyes' chapel on Kerley Downs

Kerley Downs (Cornish: Krug Bleydh, meaning wolf's tumulus) is a moorland southeast of Chacewater in Cornwall, England.
