= Quickbeam =

Quickbeam may refer to:

- Sorbus aucuparia, a tree also called rowan, or mountain ash
- Bregalad, an Ent, a fictional humanoid tree in J. R. R. Tolkien's Middle-earth
- Quickbeam hill, on Dartmoor, Devon, U.K., on the route of the former Redlake Tramway
