= Wheal Jane =

Disused tin mine in West Cornwall, England

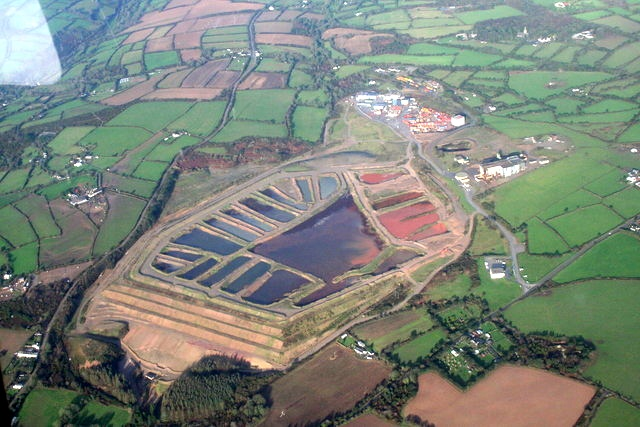
- The Tailings Dam at Wheal Jane, from the air

- Location in Cornwall
- Location: Chacewater, Cornwall, England; 50°14′31″N 5°07′35″W
- Products: Tin, copper, lead, silver, zinc, pyrite, arsenopyrite, arsenic, ochre, iron ore
- Opened: Mid-18th century
- Closed: 1992

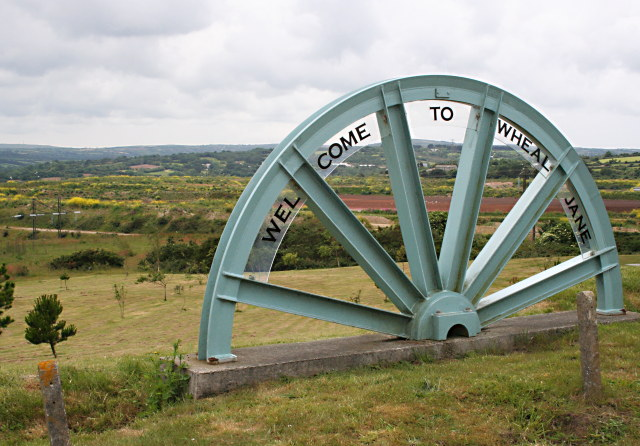
Welcome to Wheal Jane

Wheal Jane is a disused tin mine near Baldhu and Chacewater in West Cornwall, England, United Kingdom. The area itself consisted of a large number of mines.

== History ==
Wheal Jane was probably seriously worked for tin from the mid-18th century. Given the complexity of ore formation near granitic emplacements, amounts of arsenic, copper, silver and zinc were also worked at some time.

In around 1885, most of the nearby mines became uneconomic. Wheal Jane was able to struggle on for a few years, principally due to its arsenic revenue, but it too succumbed in around 1895. It re-opened in 1906 as part of Falmouth Consolidated, with a modernisation and cost reducing agenda, but it was to close again within a decade. Work recommenced at low intensity in the run up to World War II but interest was turning to more modern processing techniques to recover more tin from what was already available and the old mine spoil was re-worked until 1946.

It was re-opened again in 1969 and much development work was done underground and in improving the surface processing facilities and ownership eventually passed to Rio Tinto Zinc.

Like the remainder of Cornwall's tin mines (Geevor, Pendarves and South Crofty), it was dealt a body blow by the end of the International Tin Agreement in 1985 and the subsequent collapse of the world tin price. It never recovered and the pumps were finally switched off in early January 1992.

== Aftermath ==
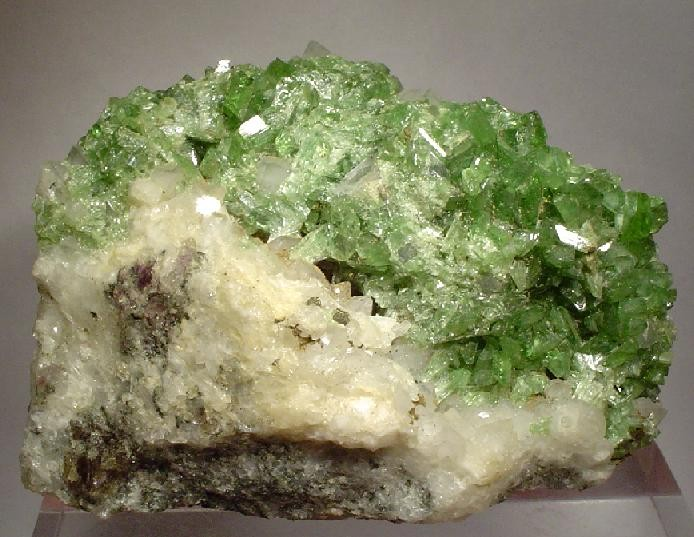
Ludlamite on Quartz, Wheal Jane mines

Wheal Jane was not out of the news though; these were the days before Environmental Impact Assessments. With the pumps no longer de-watering the mine, groundwater levels rose and flooded the former working areas, picking up waste, washing over the exposed rock faces and contaminating the groundwater.

These eventually overtopped the drainage systems in January 1992 and acid mine drainage rose through the abandoned mine, escaped into the surface water systems, and flowed into the Carnon river and eventually into Falmouth Bay, killing fish and contaminating wild fowl. By 1994, remedial measures including the construction of large settling ponds, were in place. By 2002 the water treatment had cost more than £20 million.

== Mineral Statistics ==
From Robert Hunt's Mineral Statistics of the United Kingdom.

Tin Production (1969-91)
Year(s)	Black (Tons)
1969-1971	no-details
1972	650.00
1973	1,600.00
1974	1,480.00
1975	1,276.00
1976	1,073.00
1977	951.00
1979	1,500.00
1980	626.50
1981	1,499.50
1982	1,663.80
1983	1,626.80
1984	1,863.20
1985	3,812.20
1986	4,069.90
1987	4,828.30
1988	2,953.60
1989	3,349.50
1990	3,543.00
1991	2,325.40

Zinc Production
Year(s)	Ore (Tons)
1973	2,000.00
1974	3,000.00
1975	2,739.00
1976	3,340.00
1977	3,257.00
1979	8,800.00
1980	4,331.60
1981	10,855.20
1982	10,185.90
1983	8,879.40
1984	7,159.00
1985	5,039.00
1986	5,605.40
1987	6,521.70
1988	5,502.40
1989	5,770.80
1990	6,593.20
1991	877.00

Copper Production
Year(s)	Ore (Tons)
1972-1975	no-details
1979	490.00
1980	238.00
1981	607.40
1982	635.80
1983	652.40
1984	657.20
1985	595.60
1986	602.20
1987	750.10
1988	732.30
1989	507.90
1990	945.30
1991	289.80

Employment
Year(s)	Total
1982	388
1983	408
1984	415
1985	1,061
1986	853
1987	726
1988	594
1989	572
1990	458
1991	216

== See also ==
- Mining in Cornwall and Devon
- Camborne School of Mines
- List of topics related to Cornwall
- Geevor Tin Mine
- South Crofty
- Devon Great Consols
- Great County Adit
- Consolidated Mines
