= Two Bridges =

Two Bridges may refer to:

== Places ==
In England

- Two Bridges, Devon
- Two Bridges, Cornwall
- Two Bridges, Gloucestershire

In the United States

- Two Bridges, Manhattan

more

- Zweibrücken in Germany, literally the Two Bridges
