= Marazion Marsh =

Nature reserve in Cornwall, England

- Site of Special Scientific Interest
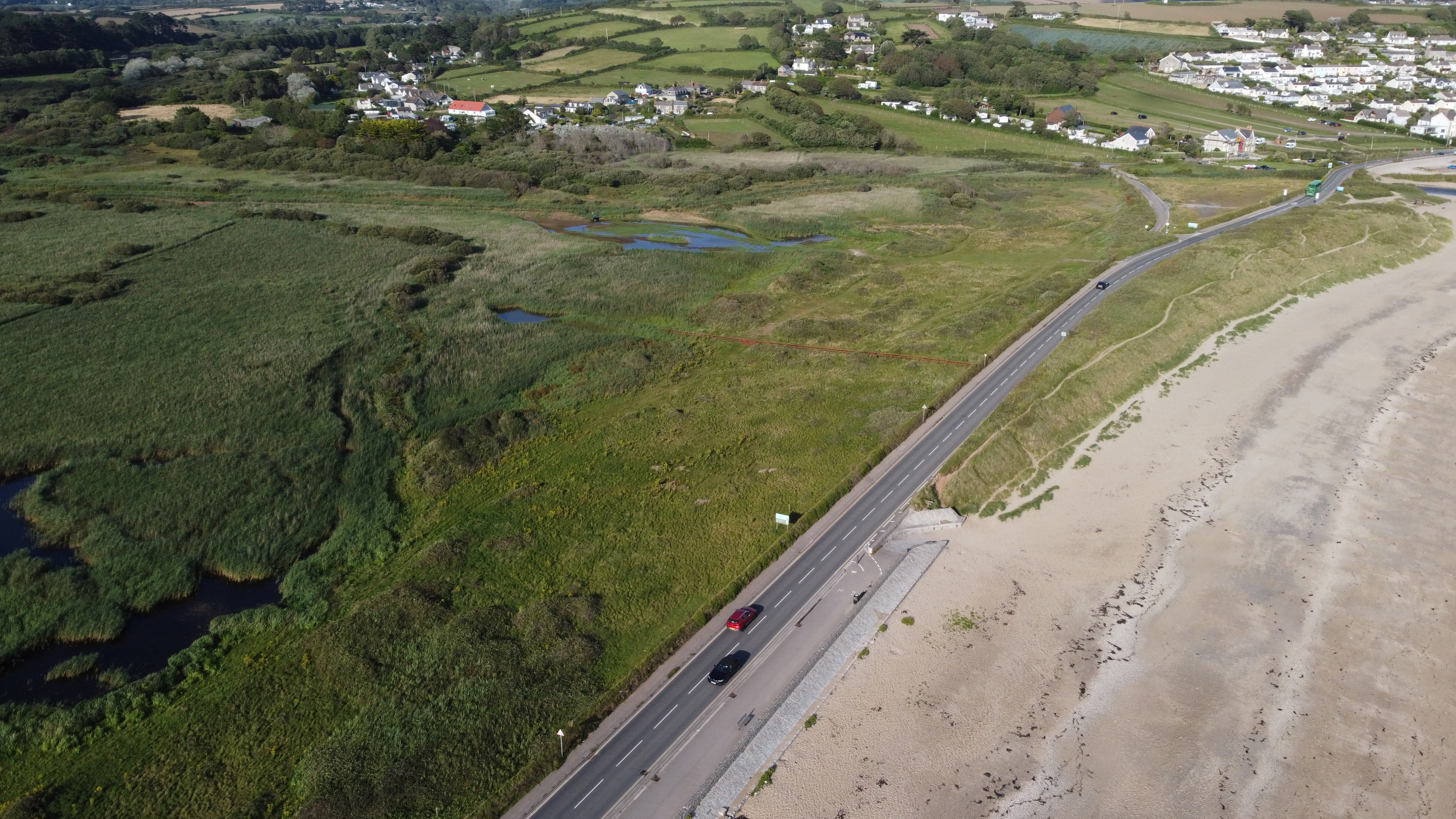
- The Marsh from the air

- Location within Cornwall Location within England
- Location of Marazion Marsh.
- Coordinates: 50.1253°N 5.4758°W
- Interest: Biological
- Area: 63.3 hectares (0.6330 km^{2}; 0.2444 sq mi)
- Notification date: 1951

Marazion Marsh is a Royal Society for the Protection of Birds (RSPB) reserve situated in a shallow river valley, half a kilometre to the west of Marazion, Cornwall, UK. It is separated from the coast by a shingle bar and small sand dune system and contains Cornwall's largest reed bed.

== Geography ==
Marazion Marsh lies to the west of the town of Marazion and 3.5 kilometres (2.2 mi) east of Penzance. The marsh is in an embayed estuary and is separated from Mount's Bay by a fossilised sand and gravel barrier which (except in extreme weather conditions) prevents access to the marsh by the sea. A discontinuous and eroded sand dune system is crossed by the main Penzance to Marazion road (formally the A394). The recent deposits sit on Lower Devonian Mylor Slates. The Red River (also known as the Marazion River) drains the Phragmites dominated marsh.

The most significant threat to the marsh at present is the runoff of soil particles in the area near the wetland. Because of this, the marsh's catchment is recognized as a Catchment Sensitive Farming Area, and the UK government works with farmers in the area to help control erosion.

=== Formation ===
A series of boreholes have been drilled into the marsh which found up to 10 metres (33 ft) of unconsolidated sedimentary material over weathered bedrock. Material from the Holocene was found. From these deposits paleoenvironmental information can be examined which include particle sizes, stratigraphy, pollen and diatoms. Evidence from the pollen was used to reconstruct the type of vegetation in the lower organic-rich horizons and samples sent to the Godwin Laboratory, University of Cambridge, for radiocarbon dating. The differing diatom flora show the changes in salinity through time. These deposits enable the reconstruction of the past environment of Marazion Marsh.

Between 5500 years and 4500 years BP there is strong evidence, using palaeoecological evidence for a rising water table, increasing salinity and organic-rich sedimentation within the marsh. The combination of the three suggests an increasing marine influence with the presence of a sedimentary barrier protecting the marsh on the seaward side. The barrier was subject to temporary overwash and/or penetration by sea water, which indicates a rise in sea-level. The main marine transgression phase took place after c. 4500 years BP, with substantial, and what look to be, rapid deposition of marine sediments on top of organic-rich deposits; similar patterns of marine transgression took place in adjacent areas. At the bottom of the sequence (i.e. the oldest sequence) are high frequencies of herbaceous pollen. As you go up through the sequences (i.e. towards the present day) there is increasing tree and shrub pollen. The changes in vegetation indicate increasing site wetness as the lower organic-rich layer accumulates. Later, Phragmites becomes established and the number of tree species decease to leave a mainly alder dominated fen-carr and reed-marsh environment. Above the organic-rich deposits are a sequence of sand-dominated sediments containing some gravel, silt and traces of organic matter.

The transition from freshwater to marine/brackishwater conditions in organic-rich basal sediments at Marazion Marsh appears to have occurred gradually, according to palaeoecological data. There is no evidence on which to argue that the changing character of the deposits was due to large-scale marine water inundation..

— Michael Healy

== History ==
About 63 acres (25 ha) were successfully drained for agriculture by Dr Richard Moyle, in May 1793 when he had the first drainage pipes laid. Of this 36 acres (15 ha) of the area was tidal marsh which was between the sandy embankment formed by the sea and the croft. Open trenches were dug across the marsh in June and in one of the drains, at a depth of three feet, was found a pot containing around one thousand copper coins. The corroded coins have been tentatively identified as having been issued by the Emperor Victorinus (reigned 268 to 270 or 271): ″... these coins were much injured by the corrosion of the marine acid, but several were still perfect enough to trace the outlines of the Emperor″.

The Red River (formerly known as the Ponsandean stream) has been “streamed” for tin up to its source at Tregilliowe (SW540329).

In 1951 the marsh was designated a Site of Special Scientific Interest for its biological characteristics. Some of the reasons for its designation include providing a feeding ground for passage waders and wintering birds, a breeding pair of the nationally scarce Cetti's warbler (Cettia cetti), rare plants such as pillwort (Pilularia globulifera) and a high number of dragonfly species.

The site is owned by the St Aubyn Estates and in 1990 they met with the RSPB to draw up a lease for the management of the site. At that time the reed bed was drying out, with a buildup of dead leaves and stems, and suffering from natural succession into willow scrub. The reed bed was in poor condition with the hot dry summer and emergency measures were taken to flood the site. Within three days a large pool appeared, and 154 individuals of eleven species of dragonfly were counted in the next few weeks.

Marazion Marsh was designated a Special Protection Area (SPA) in 2001 for aquatic warbler and bittern.

== Ecology and natural history ==
=== Habitat ===
Reed beds are one of the rarest habitats in the UK with only fifty greater than 20 ha. Marazion Marsh (16.8 ha) contains the largest reed-bed in Cornwall, the most westerly on mainland Britain and is an important reserve for breeding and overwintering birds and passage migrants. The reed bed is managed for Eurasian bittern (Botaurus stellaris) and is maintained by cutting the Phragmites australis, removing dead litter and cutting back the invasive species such as willow (Salix cinerea var atrocinerea). The reserve also contains 3 ha of unimproved grassland, open water, woodland, willow scrub.

== Notable birds ==
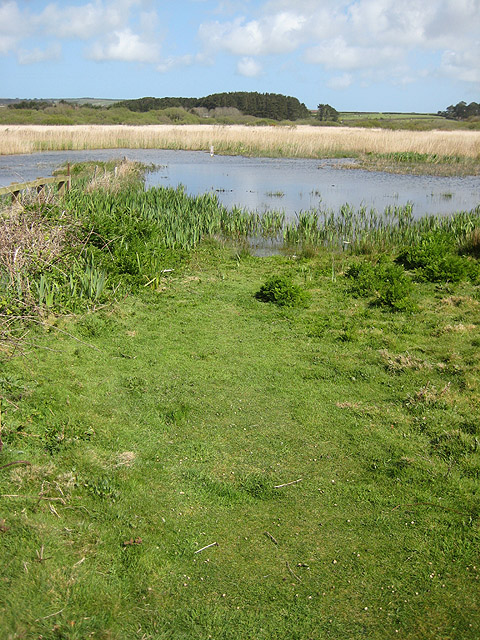
Marazion Marsh Nature Reserve

Up to five bitterns overwinter at the reserve, although the reed-bed is below the minimum size of twenty ha required by this species for breeding. Funding for the management of the reserve has been received from the EU LIFE Programme's Bittern Project (2001–2007).
