= Carnhot =

Hamlet in Cornwall, England

Coordinates: 50.256°N 5.163°W

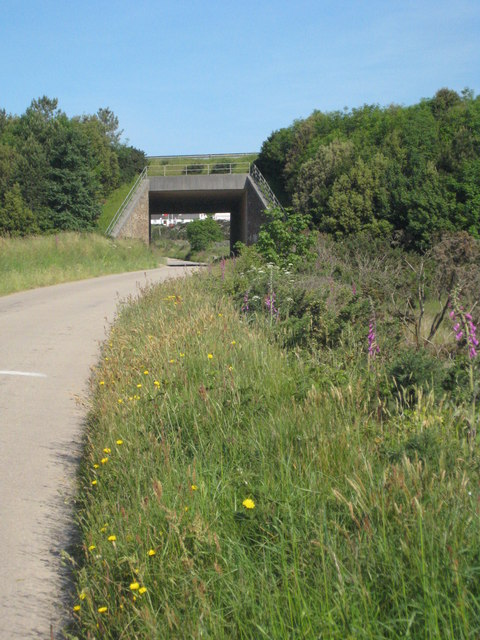
The A30 overbridge at Carnhot

Carnhot is a hamlet in the civil parish of Chacewater in Cornwall, England. Carnot lies 2 miles (3.2 km) north-west of Chacewater on the road to Blackwater, Cornwall. Carnot is just to the south of the A30 road.

Carnhot lies within Cornwall and West Devon Mining Landscape which is a World Heritage Site.
