= Wheal Peevor =

Former metalliferous mine in Cornwall, England

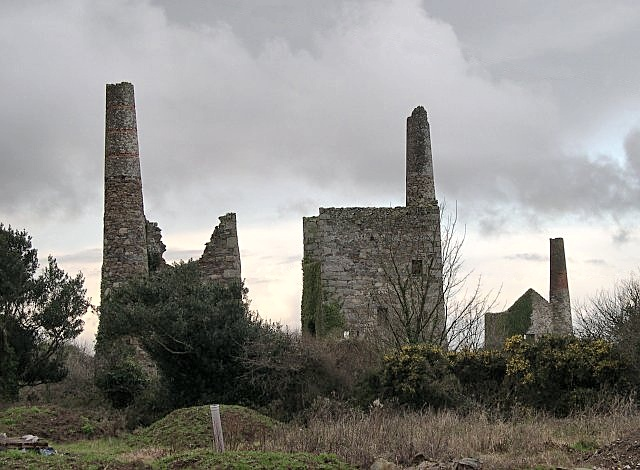
- The engine houses at Wheal Peevor

- Location in Cornwall
- Location: Redruth, Cornwall, England; 50°15′12″N 5°13′00″W
- Products: Copper and Tin
- Opened: 1701 (approx)
- Closed: 1889

Wheal Peevor was a metalliferous mine located on North Downs about 1.5 miles north-east of Redruth, Cornwall, England. The first mining sett was granted here in around 1701 on land owned by the St Aubyn family. It was originally mined at shallow depths for copper, but when the price for that metal slumped after 1788, the mine was able to change to mining tin ore, which was found deeper down. In the late 18th century Wheal Peevor had the advantage of being drained by the Great County Adit which was around 100 metres deep here. The mine covered only 12 acres (4.8 ha) but had rich tin lodes. In addition to tin and copper, pyrite was also mined here between 1872 and 1887.

== History ==
In 1790, the mine was considered part of Great North Downs mine; it was opened separately in 1872 as Wheal Peevor. By 1878 the mine was described as the ″surprise of Cornish mining″ because it was making a profit from tin while other Cornish mines were making a loss or closing. It was also described as a ″young mine″ indicating that it had recently re-opened. At that time the mine was employing 156 workers underground. There were 300 miners working at Wheal Peevor in 1880. The mine closed in 1889, almost 20 years after the price of tin was depressed due to the discovery of large, easily mined deposits in the Far East. Some exploratory work was undertaken on the site on several occasions in the 20th century.

In 1911, a company acquired the mine property with the hope of being able to reopen operations. Their plan was to begin by working the surface ground and given satisfactory results, to then remove the water from the mine itself. After the mine was reopened, many of the original structures were altered to accommodate newer and larger equipment. Only a small amount of tin and tungsten was produced and the mine was closed again in 1918. Later attempts to reopen the mine in 1938 and in the 1950s were also unsuccessful.

== Present day ==
Since 2003 more than £800,000 has been spent on preserving the buildings on this derelict site, and it was opened to the public in January 2008. The site is unusual because it contains the remains of three engine houses: the largest engine, with a 72 inch cylinder, was used for pumping water out of the mine; the second, used for winching material in and out of its shaft was at the eastern side of the sett; and the third with a 32 inch engine operated 48 heads of Californian stamps for crushing the ore. Wheal Peevor is now part of the Mineral Tramways Project and the Cornwall and West Devon Mining Landscape World Heritage Site.

Several of the structures at Wheal Peevor became Grade II listed buildings on 12 September 1989: the stamps house, the pump house a house on the property north of the pump engine house and the Winding Engine House. A portion of the mine has been designated as a historic monument since 15 January 1974
