= Poldice mine =

Former metalliferous mine in southwest Cornwall, England

Poldice
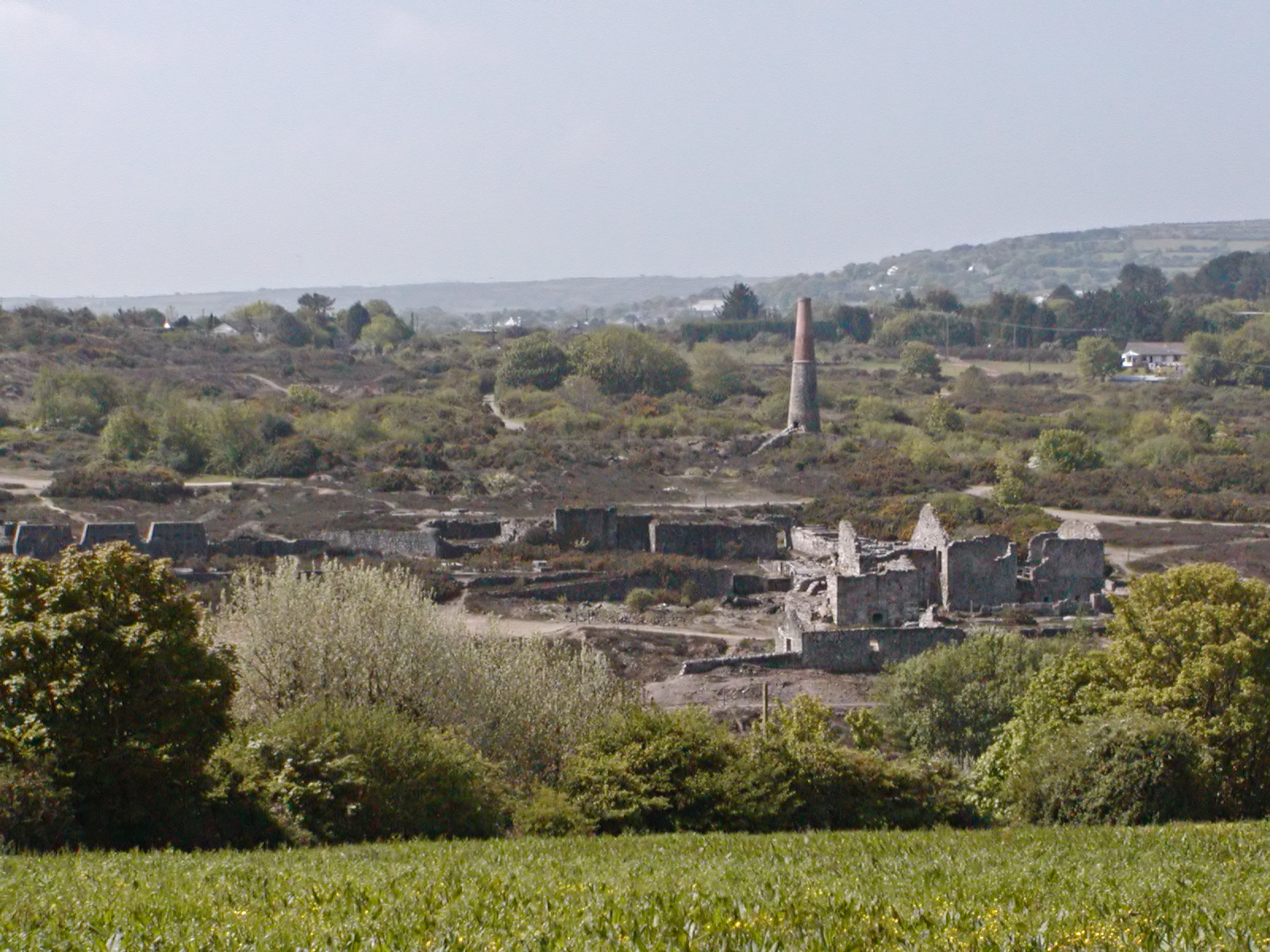
- The ruins of Poldice mine

- Location in Cornwall
- Location: St Day,Cornwall, England; 50°14′36″N 5°10′09″W
- Products: Tin, Copper, Arsenic and others
- Opened: 17th century or earlier
- Closed: 1930

Poldice mine is a former metalliferous mine located in Poldice Valley in southwest Cornwall, England, United Kingdom. It is situated near the hamlet of Todpool, between the villages of Twelveheads and St Day, three miles (5 km) east of Redruth.

== History ==
A legal document of 1512 about a theft of tin "near Poldyth in Wennap" indicates that mining was probably taking place around Poldice at that time, but this mine is certainly known to have been in operation by the 17th century. At the end of the 17th and beginning of the 18th century, 800 to 1,000 men were employed.

In 1748, Poldice's chief adventurer William Lemon and manager John Williams started the Great County Adit in the Carnon Valley. It formed a cheap and effective method of draining many of the mines in the locality and also provided a means of locating new lodes of ore. When the adit reached Poldice in the late 1760s, the mine was using two Newcomen steam engines, with cylinders of diameter 66 inches and 60 inches to drain the mine into the adit.

As the mine was some distance from the sea, transport to market was a problem for the mining operation. A pioneering railway, the Portreath Tramroad was opened in 1812 giving access to Portreath harbour.

In November 1821 a 90-inch Woolf single-cylinder pumping engine was installed at the mine, the third one of this size in the county, after two had been installed at Consolidated Mines in February of the same year. These were by far the largest steam engines in Cornwall at the time. In 1842 this engine was raising an average of 887 gallons per minute and it was one of the most heavily worked engines in the county. It was re-cylindered as an 85 inch in 1845 and was still working well when it was sold for £700 in August 1867 to Great Western Deep Coal Co. in the Forest of Dean.

By the 1860s the copper industry was in decline, and some time between 1869 and 1872 the mine sold £12,000 worth of redundant equipment to J. C. Lanyon & Son of Redruth, a major dealer and exporter of mine equipment. Despite these sales, the mine purchased from Perran Foundry a new 85-inch pumping engine that cost £2,250 and which was in operation by early 1873. At the time it was needed to deal with the water flooding into the mine as a result of a very wet winter, but in July 1873 after working for just 6 months, the engine was up for sale and the mine had closed because it was unable to cope with the cost of pumping water out of the workings. The engine was sold to a company in Scotland.

== Minerals ==
The mine was extracting tin ore in 1748, but by 1788 the output of copper ore exceeded that of tin, and by the 1790s it was making a good profit. In the early 19th century the mine merged with neighbour Wheal Unity. The mine switched to arsenic extraction, although metals were still being mined in decreasing quantities, but by the 1910s most of the activity was over and although small-scale mining continued into the 1920s, it closed in 1930.

Apart from the enormous quantities of the common ores mined at Poldice, the area was also known for rarer and more valuable minerals including chalcophyllite, olivenite, mimetite and liroconite.

== The site today ==
Today, the ruins of many mine buildings and mineshafts are visible in the Poldice Valley, which has not seen any further development since the end of mining. The valley is now a nature reserve, and is a popular location for mountain bicycling.

== Mineral Statistics ==
From Robert Hunt's Mineral Statistics of the United Kingdom.

Copper Production (from ticketing records; 1801-1867)
Year(s)	Ore (Tons)	Metal (Tons)	Value (£)	Comment
1801	925.00	78.32	7345.75	Cu est., 6 months only
1802	1497.00	118.71	9860.85	Cu est., c 6 months only
1803	2176.00	183.84	18337.25	Cu est., c 8 months only
1804	4295.00	337.41	37296.08	Cu est
1805	4852.00	382.84	52785.53	Cu est
1806	4654.00	402.10	41806.93	..
1807	4189.00	383.74	32859.98	Cu partly est
1808	3678.00	357.94	25938.38	Cu est
1809	3529.00	284.54	31259.80	Cu est
1810	3559.00	262.75	25331.35	..
1811	3659.00	289.97	25295.68	..
1812	1882.00	147.92	12003.90	..
1813	680.00	54.22	4616.10	..
1814	989.00	77.68	7765.20	..
1815	854.00	62.47	5390.65	..
1816	914.00	69.04	4612.73	..
1817	619.00	43.46	3084.70	..
1818	970.00	52.49	5015.48	..
1819	726.00	46.23	4282.15	Cu est., with Unity
1820	553.00	39.66	3106.00	With Unity
1821	1322.00	107.33	7423.40	..
1822	2955.00	259.08	19518.00	Includes some Unity ore, Cu partly est., with Poldice & Unity Wood, excludes fluorspar sold at copper ticketings
1823	3792.00	365.90	29398.20	Includes 2 months Unity ore, Cu est. with Unity, & with Unity Wood, excludes fluorspar
1824	3678.00	342.80	27542.10	Cu est., with Unity, excludes fluorspar
1825	3490.00	290.03	28608.83	Cu est., with Unity
1826	3677.00	306.62	23279.40	Cu est., with Unity & Poldice, East
1827	3359.00	280.59	21674.78	Cu est., with Poldice, East & Unity. Excludes fluorspar
1828	3687.00	295.83	23145.80	Cu est., with Poldice, East & Unity
1829	4213.00	329.39	24933.58	Cu est., with Unity. Excludes fluorspar
1830	3383.00	275.65	19656.68	With Unity. Excludes fluorspar
1831	2563.00	209.63	14169.13	With Unity. Excludes fluorspar
1832	1755.00	146.14	10680.60	With Unity
1833	1403.00	117.26	9449.13	..
1834	999.00	80.98	6165.03	Cu est., with Unity
1835	669.00	56.54	4217.10	Cu partly est., with Unity
1836	762.00	52.77	4699.68	..
1837	785.00	61.70	4578.43	..
1838	910.00	73.40	5560.83	Fluorspar excluded
1839	864.00	80.85	6015.15	Fluorspar excluded
1840	1238.00	113.03	9101.60	..
1841	2298.00	189.15	17200.90	..
1842	2809.00	220.18	17121.13	..
1843	3088.00	226.84	16665.45	..
1844	2928.00	206.59	14701.45	..
1848	944.00	81.47	4859.55	From Mineral Statistics
1867	46.00	2.47	167.90	From HJ/7/7

Tin Production (1867-1930)
Year(s)	Black (Tons)	Stuff (Tons)	Value (£)
1867	41.90	..	1,976.90
1868	112.80	..	5,563.40
1869	157.00	..	10,378.30
1870	275.50	..	19,591.10
1871	307.50	..	23,352.60
1872	212.70	..	17,608.00
1873	176.20	..	13,651.60
1874	20.60	..	1,111.90
1875	24.00	15.90	1,309.00
1876	3.10	17.80	235.60
1877	4.80	7.60	198.30
1878	6.30	..	201.50
1879	..	100.00	126.00
1888-1889	no-details	..	..
1890	2.40	5,117.00	1,690.00
1891	3.00	3,367.00	710.00
1892	..	66.00	77.00
1898	..	42.00	17.00
1899	..	74.00	44.00
1900	no-details	..	..
1905	no-details	..	..
1906	..	511.00	416.00
1907	..	512.00	343.00
1908	..	695.00	461.00
1909	..	411.00	329.00
1910	..	381.00	53.00
1912	..	223.00	409.00
1913	..	933.00	675.00
1914	..	..	211.00
1915	..	..	445.00
1916	no detailed return	..	..
1917	6.00	..	442.00
1917-1921	no-details	..	..
1918	0.05	..	12.00
1928-1930	no-details	..	..

Arsenic Production (1867-1918)
Year(s)	Ore (Tons)	Value (£)
1867	38.90	87.40
1870	50.00	105.60
1872	105.00	200.00
1873	68.00	264.10
1889	8.00	42.00
1890	12.00	71.00
1891	7.00	47.00
1893	7.00	80.00
1895	11.00	94.00
1896	3.00	44.00
1918	no detailed return	..

Employment (1878-1930)
Year(s)	Total	Overground	Underground
1878	9	6	3
1879	7	4	3
1888	41	20	21
1889	28	21	7
1890	47	29	18
1891	5	1	4
1892	3	..	3
1893	4	..	4
1894	2	..	2
1895	9	9	..
1896	11	11	..
1898-1900	4	..	4
1905	7	7	..
1906	8	8	..
1908	16	16	..
1909	7	7	..
1910	11	11	..
1911	12	8	4
1912	15	13	2
1913	16	14	2
1917	9	9	..
1918	72	72	..
1919	147	145	2
1919	147	145	2
1920	125	123	2
1928	6	..	6
1929	58	58	..
1930	6	6	..

== See also ==
- Consolidated Mines
- Devon Great Consols
- Wheal Vor
- Wheal Jane
- Mining in Cornwall and Devon
- Portreath Tramroad

== Sources ==
- Barton, D. B. (1966). The Cornish Beam Engine (New ed.). Truro: D. Bradford Barton Ltd.
