= Salem, Cornwall =

Coordinates: 50.254°N 5.172°W

Salem
- Location within Cornwall
- OS grid reference: SW740442
- Unitary authority: Cornwall
- Ceremonial county: Cornwall
- Region: South West
- Country: England
- Sovereign state: United Kingdom

Salem is a hamlet west of Chacewater, Cornwall, England.
