= Hale Mills =

Hamlet in the parish of Chacewater, Cornwall, England

Coordinates: 50.237°N 5.153°W

Hale Mills is a hamlet in the parish of Chacewater, Cornwall, England.
