= Billy Bray =

British preacher (1794–1868)

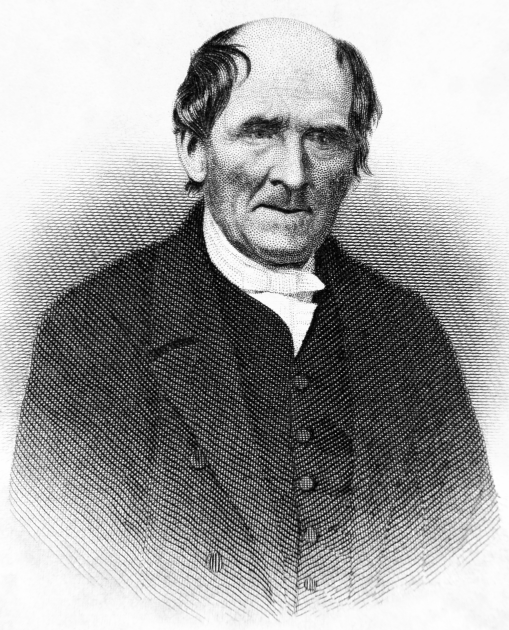
Billy Bray

William Trewartha Bray (1 June 1794 – 25 May 1868), known as Billy Bray, was an unconventional Cornish preacher.

== Biography ==
Billy Bray was born in 1794 in Twelveheads, Cornwall, England, UK. He was the eldest of three children born to William Bray, a miner, and his wife Ann, who came from Gwennap. William Bray died when his children were young, and they were cared for by their grandfather, who was a pious Methodist. After leaving school, Billy Bray worked as a miner in Cornwall and for seven years in Devon; during this time, he was a drunkard prone to riotous behavior. In 1821, he married Joanna, a lapsed Methodist, and they eventually had seven children.

In 1823, he had a close escape from a mining accident and later said that he was converted in November of that year by reading John Bunyan's Visions of Heaven and Hell. (Note: Bourne (1872), p. 4, and Martin (2009). The book referred to as being by Bunyan is now known to have been written by the publisher George Larkin and was first published in 1711 under the title The world to come; or, The glories of heaven and the terrors of hell lively displayed under the similitude of a vision. "A prospect of heaven; A prospect of hell." See, for instance, The visions of John Bunyan; being his last remains... National Library of Australia. 1795.) He became attached to a group of Methodists known as the Bible Christians and became a well-known but unconventional preacher, his sermons being enlivened by spontaneous outbursts of singing and dancing. Bray did not restrict his activities to preaching, raising two orphans with his children, and generously giving help to other people. He also raised enough funds to build three new Methodist chapels, one in his home village of Twelveheads, one at Carharrack, and one—nicknamed 'Three Eyes' chapel because of its three windows—at nearby Kerley Downs.

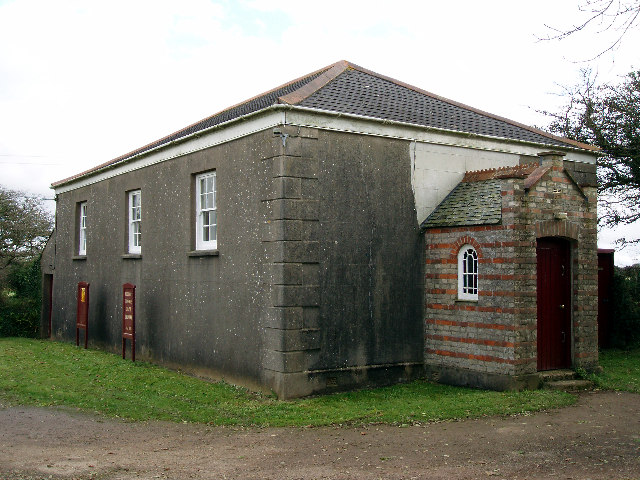
Billy Bray's 'Three Eyes' chapel on Kerley Downs

Bray died in 1868 and is buried at the Saint Michael and All Angels parish church in Baldhu, where a granite obelisk marks his grave. In 1984, the 'Three Eyes' chapel, the only one of the three he built that is still standing, was dedicated to his memory.

== Legacy ==
F. W. Bourne wrote a biography of Bray entitled The King's Son which, after its first publication in 1871, went through many editions under several titles for over a hundred years. (Note: A number of these editions and variant titles are listed in the Copac catalogue here. Several early editions of the work are available online, such as this 25th edition (1887) at the Internet Archive.) According to this biography, one of Bray's favourite sayings, which he used when people complained about his enthusiastic singing and shouting, was

If they were to put me in a barrel, I would shout glory out through the bunghole! Praise the Lord!

William James referred to Bray as "an excellent little illiterate English evangelist" in his The Varieties of Religious Experience published in 1902. Annie Dillard refers to Bray in the last sentence of her 1974 Pulitzer Prize-winning Pilgrim at Tinker Creek. J I Packer, in Knowing God, writes, "John Owen and John Calvin knew more theology than John Bunyan and Billy Bray, but who would deny that the latter pair knew their God every bit as well as the former?"

Billy Bray in His Own Words by Chris Wright was published in 2004; it is based on the previously unpublished journal of Bray, written in his handwriting, that had lain untouched since the nineteenth century. Bray's life was celebrated by the Devon folk songwriter Seth Lakeman in the song "Preacher's Ghost" on his 2010 album Hearts and Minds.

Michael Bentley wrote a children's book about him, published in 2012.
