= Carnon River =

River in Cornwall, England

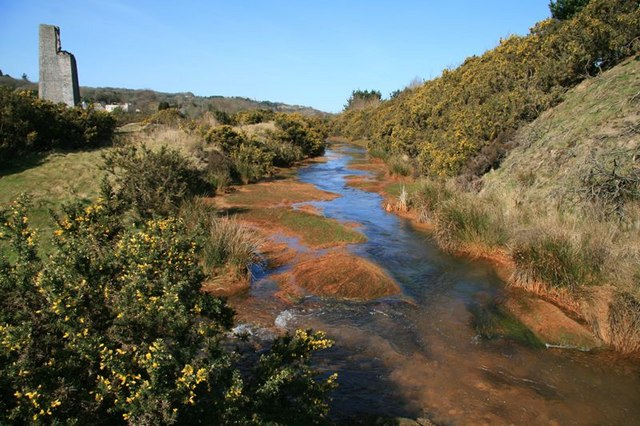
- Carnon River near Point Mills

- Location within Cornwall

Location
- Country: England
- County: Cornwall

Physical characteristics
- Source
  - location: Chacewater, Cornwall
  - coordinates: 50°15′45″N 5°09′30″W
- Mouth: Restronguet Creek
  - location: Cornwall
  - coordinates: 50°12′28″N 5°04′59″W

Basin features
- Tributaries
  - left: 50°12′51″N 5°05′55″W, 50°12′51″N 5°05′54″W, 50°12′51″N 5°05′54″W, 50°12′45″N 5°05′54″W, 50°12′20″N 5°05′02″W
  - right: 50°14′14″N 5°08′31″W, 50°13′49″N 5°07′35″W, Trewenda Water 50°12′54″N 5°06′04″W, River Kennall 50°12′25″N 5°05′29″W, Tallack's Creek 50°12′38″N 5°04′59″W

The Carnon River (Cornish: Avon Carnon) is a heavily polluted river in Cornwall, England, United Kingdom. It starts in Chacewater. Both Trewedna Water and River Kennall flow into the Carnon before it merges with Tallack's Creek to become Restronguet Creek, which eventually flows into the English Channel at the mouth of Carrick Roads.

== History ==
The Nebra sky disc, a gold-decorated bronze disc found in Germany and dated to the Bronze Age, contains both gold and tin from the Carnon valley. An antler pick was also discovered in 1790, along with other artefacts. In 2016, the pick was dated to the Early Bronze Age.

In 1992, the river was hit by a major pollution incident, when over 45 million litres of contaminated water from the closed Wheal Jane mine was released by the collapse of an adit, colouring the river water red. A treatment works has since been installed at Wheal Jane to intercept the contaminated water and treat it to remove suspended metals and restore a neutral pH.

== See also ==
- List of rivers in Cornwall
- List of rivers of England
