= Jolly's Bottom =

Village in Cornwall, England

Coordinates: 50.26°N 5.15°W

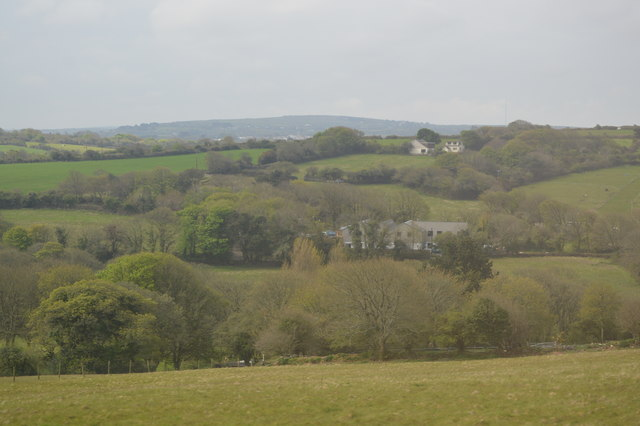

- Location within Cornwall
- Civil parish: Chacewater
- Unitary authority: Cornwall
- Ceremonial county: Cornwall
- Region: South West
- Country: England
- Sovereign state: United Kingdom
- Police: Devon and Cornwall
- Fire: Cornwall
- Ambulance: South Western

Jolly's Bottom is in west Cornwall, England, United Kingdom. It is situated approximately a half mile (1 km) north of Chacewater and straddles the main line railway.

The settlement is in Chacewater civil parish and the births and burials from Jolly's Bottom residents are recorded in the Parish Registers. The name Jolly's Bottom may have originated from a landholding by the Jolly family.
