= Chacewater and Kenwyn (electoral division) =

Former electoral division of Cornwall in the UK

- Former ward Cornwall Council
- County: Cornwall

2009–2013
- Number of councillors: One
- Replaced by: Chacewater, Kenwyn and Baldhu; Feock and Playing Place
- Created from: Council created

Chacewater and Kenwyn (Cornish: Dowr an Chas ha Keynwyn) was an electoral division of Cornwall in the United Kingdom which returned one member to sit on Cornwall Council from 2009 to 2013. The sole Councillor was John Dyer, a Conservative.

The division covered 5096 hectares in total. It was abolished by the Cornwall (Electoral Changes) Order 2011, and Dyer went on to be elected as Councillor for Chacewater, Kenwyn and Baldhu.

== Election results ==
=== 2009 election ===
2009 election: Chacewater and Kenwyn
Party	Candidate	Votes	%	±%
Conservative	John Dyer	851	67.2	N/A
Liberal Democrats	Maurice Vella	333	26.3	N/A
Labour	Timothy Walsh	65	5.1	N/A
Majority		518	40.9	N/A
Majority		17	1.3	N/A
Turnout		1266	42.9	N/A
Conservative win (new seat)				
