= Redlake Tramway =

Former railway in Devon, England

Coordinates: 50.4°N 3.89°W

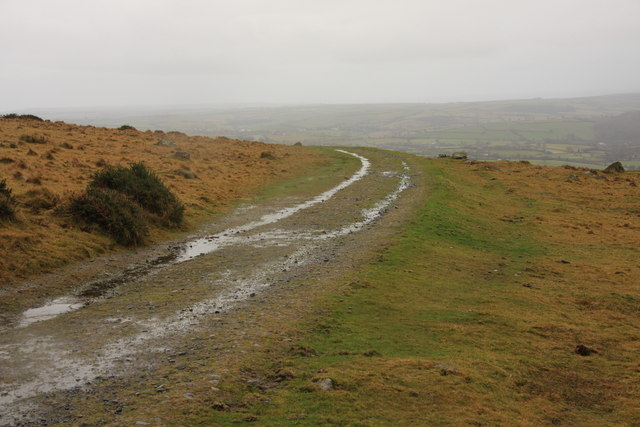
The track of the dismantled Redlake Tramway curving around the south-western slopes of Western Beacon

The Redlake Tramway was a railway built to carry supplies and workers between Bittaford and the clay workings at Redlake, near the centre of the southern part of Dartmoor, Devon, England. It was built in 1911 to a 3 ft (914 mm) narrow gauge, and ran for a circuitous 8.3 miles (13.4 km).

== Remnants ==
The track bed remains today. It can be followed from Bittaford Moor Gate providing access to several tors and hills such as Hangershell Rock, Sharp Tor, Piles Hill, Three Barrows, Eastern and Western White Barrows and Quickbeam Hill.

The trackbed is lined at various points with marker posts, disused quarries and earthworks. Towards the top of the ascent are Leftlake and Redlake itself. Both are abandoned pits that have been flooded, creating lakes (the word "lake" in both names derives from the streams flowing through the areas, not the artificial lakes, which are recent features). There is a robust stone bridge at Leftlake, with a rudimentary name plaque engraved in mortar. At Redlake there are the remains of a demolished pumphouse, along with other ruins.

At the southern end of the line remains the old bridge abutments of the track going over the incline which lowered wagons to give access to the standard gauge mainline, the trackbed of the incline, the base of the winding house, and at the line's extremities the locomotive and carriage shed remains.

== Locomotives ==
The small line had a total of three locomotives in its 21-year lifetime. First delivered was 'C.A.Hanson', the locomotive having been named after the clay works owner. It was a 3 ft gauge version of a Kerr Stuart standard gauge Waterloo class, the smaller gauge being achieved simply by putting the wheels in between the frames instead of outside (Outside frames) - Apart from this it was a standard loco design.

The second locomotive was 'Dartmoor', a Kerr Stuart Tattoo class loco. It was of standard Tattoo design, so no drawings exist of this exact loco, except for the cab which was different to offer greater protection considering Dartmoor's harsh climate.

The third loco was 'Lady-Mallaby Deeley', and 0-4-0 geared vertical boilered locomotive. Built by Atkinson Walker's, it was the sister of the AW tractor provided to the Clogher Valley Railway, which was reputed to be unsuccessful, thus being converted to diesel. It survives to this day. Unlike the CVR tractor, the Redlake one was deemed highly successful and was the preferred loco at the time (C.A. Hanson having been scrapped in 1921).

Both 'Dartmoor' and 'Lady-Mallaby Deeley' were scrapped on the line's closure in 1932.

== Sources ==
- Harris, Helen (1992). The Industrial Archaeology of Dartmoor. Newton Abbot: Peninsula Press. ISBN 1-872640-21-4.
- Wade, E A (May 2004). The Redlake Tramway & China Clay Works. Twelveheads Press. ISBN 0-906294-56-8.
