= Penstraze =

Coordinates: 50.274°N 5.147°W

Penstraze: Cornish: Pennstras
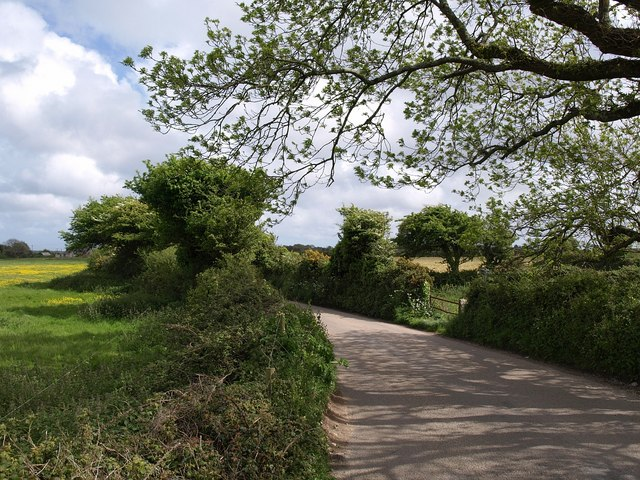
- A road near Penstraze

- Location within Cornwall
- Unitary authority: Cornwall
- Ceremonial county: Cornwall
- Region: South West
- Country: England
- Sovereign state: United Kingdom
- Police: Devon and Cornwall
- Fire: Cornwall
- Ambulance: South Western

Penstraze (Cornish: Pennstras, meaning end of the flat-bottomed valley) is a hamlet north of Chacewater in west Cornwall, England.

== Cornish wrestling ==
There were Cornish wrestling tournaments in little Penstraze, for prizes.
