= River Inny, Cornwall =

River in east Cornwall, England

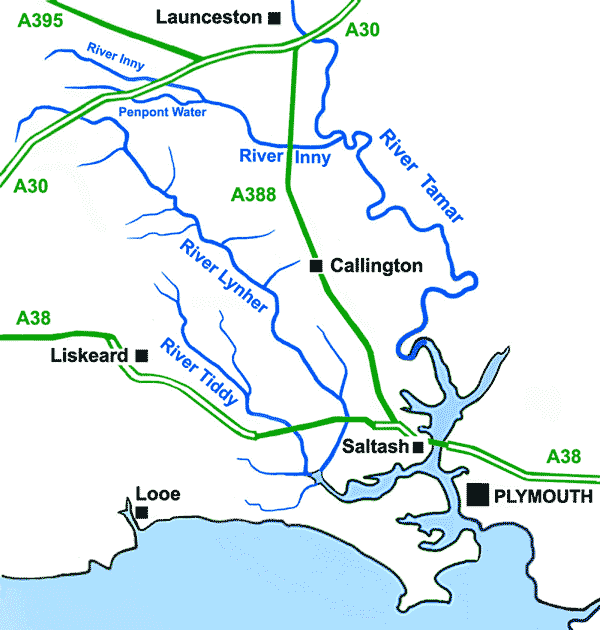
A sketchmap of the River Tamar showing tributaries including the River Inny

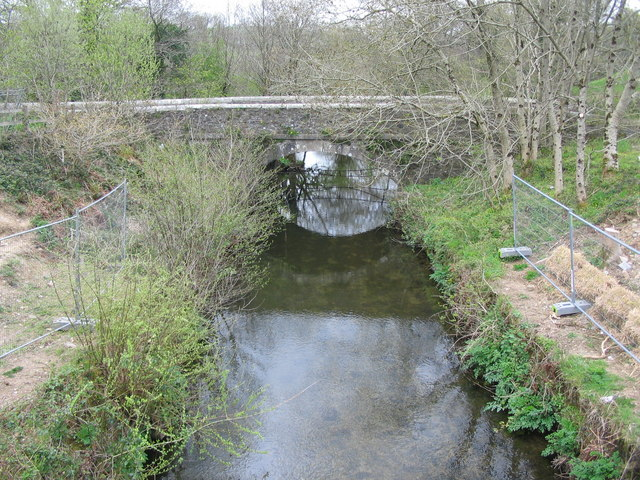
The road bridge at Two Bridges

The River Inny (Cornish: Dowr Enni) is a small river in East Cornwall, England, United Kingdom. A tributary of the River Tamar, the Inny is about twenty miles (32 km) long from its source near Davidstow on the eastern flank of Bodmin Moor to its confluence with the Tamar at Inny Foot near Dunterton.

The Inny's catchment is 108 square kilometres. The Inny's main tributary, Penpont Water, joins it at Two Bridges.

The course of River Inny is initially east-southeast. From Two Bridges it runs southeast before running due east for the last few miles to its confluence with the Tamar.

River Inny supports trout, grayling, sea trout and salmon populations. Other wildlife species include the otter, kingfisher, sand martin, dipper, curlew and snipe.

== Location ==
- Source coordinates 50.65305°N 4.61752°W grid reference SX 150 869
- Confluence coordinates 50.57844°N 4.28982°W grid reference SX 378 779
