= Great County Adit =

Series of interconnected drainage adits in Cornwall, England

Coordinates: 50°14′04″N 5°08′24″W

The Great County Adit, sometimes called the County Adit, or the Great Adit was a system of interconnected adits that helped drain water from the tin and copper mines in the Gwennap area of Cornwall, in the United Kingdom. Construction started in 1748 and it eventually reached a length of over 40 miles (64 km) of a tunnel, providing drainage to over 100 mines at an average depth of 80–100 metres (260–330 ft).

The adit was the brainchild of John Williams (born 1714) of Scorrier who was the manager of Poldice mine. Although work was started in 1748, it did not reach Poldice mine until the late 1760s. By 1778 the adit had been extended past Wheal Busy to Wheal Peevor, and another branch, known as the Consols Adit was driven west in the 1770s and 80s to drain the Consolidated Mines and United Mines. By 1792 a branch from Poldice extended to Wheal Unity.

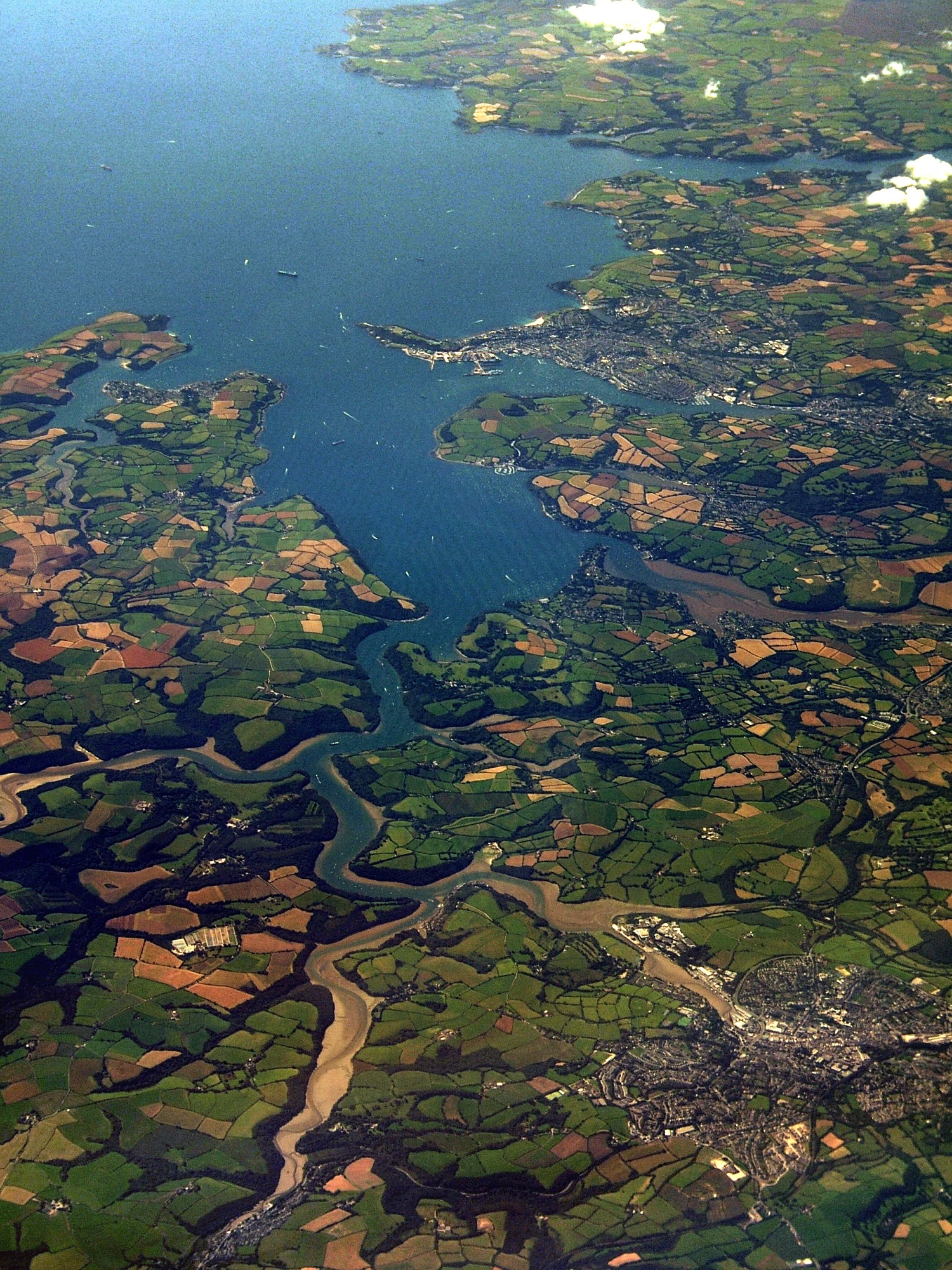
Carrick Roads, showing the silted-up Restronguet Creek at centre right

The portal of the adit is in the Carnon Valley below the hamlet of Twelveheads. In 1839, probably at its peak, it discharged over 14.5 million gallons (66 million litres) of water per day into the Carnon River. At that time the adit had more steam engines pumping into it than were used by the whole of continental Europe and America combined.

The Carnon River empties into Restronguet Creek (a tidal arm of the Carrick Roads upstream from Falmouth). Major floods in the winter of 1876 caused large quantities of gangue and silt to be washed into the higher part of Restronguet Creek, permanently damaging navigational access to the upper quays at Devoran.

Although all the mines served by the Great County Adit have closed and it is unmaintained, it still drains many of their underground workings today; in the summer of 1980 the flow was 500,000 gallons per day.

== See also ==
- Mining in Cornwall

== Sources ==
- Buckley, J A (2000). The Great County Adit. Pool, Camborne, Cornwall: Penhellick Publications. ISBN 1-871678-51-X.
- "Cornwall Industrial Settlements Initiative - St Day" (PDF). Historic Environment, Cornwall Council. March 2002.
- "Water drainage". Cornish Mining World Heritage. Archived from the original on 9 December 2008.
