= Two Bridges, Cornwall =

Hamlet in Cornwall, England

Coordinates: 50°36′34″N 4°26′44″W

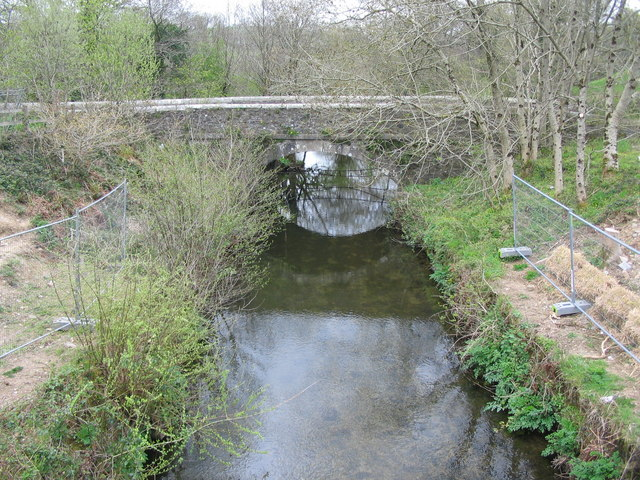
The old road bridge at Two Bridges

Two Bridges is a settlement in east Cornwall, England, United Kingdom, 4 miles (6 km) west-southwest of Launceston at the point where the A30 trunk road crosses the River Inny. The Inny's main tributary, Penpont Water, joins it at Two Bridges.
