= Todpool =

Hamlet in Cornwall, England

Coordinates: 50.246°N 5.173°W

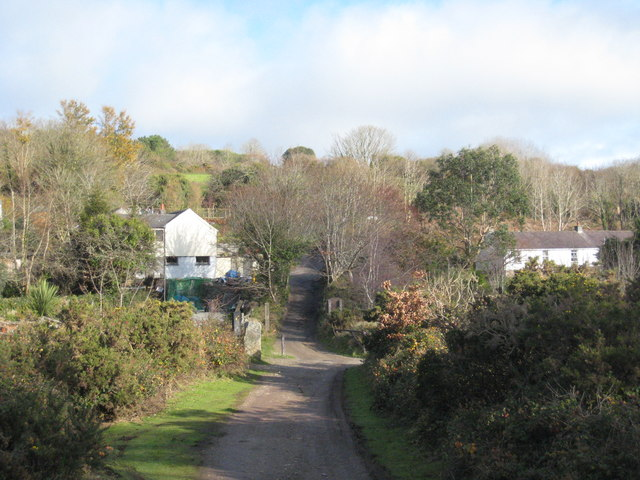
Todpool

Todpool is a hamlet in west Cornwall, England, United Kingdom. It is located between Chacewater and St Day villages and is three miles (5 km) east of Redruth.

During the 19th century, Todpool was an important site for tin mining due to its proximity to Poldice mine. Today, disused mineshafts and derelict engine houses are scattered throughout the area. Todpool was once busy enough to support a pub (now a private house) and a church, but is now a quiet backwater of miners' cottages.

The road that runs through Todpool is Bownder An Sycamor, which translates from Cornish as Sycamore Lane.
