= Penpont Water =

River in east Cornwall, England

Coordinates: 50.609°N 4.446°W

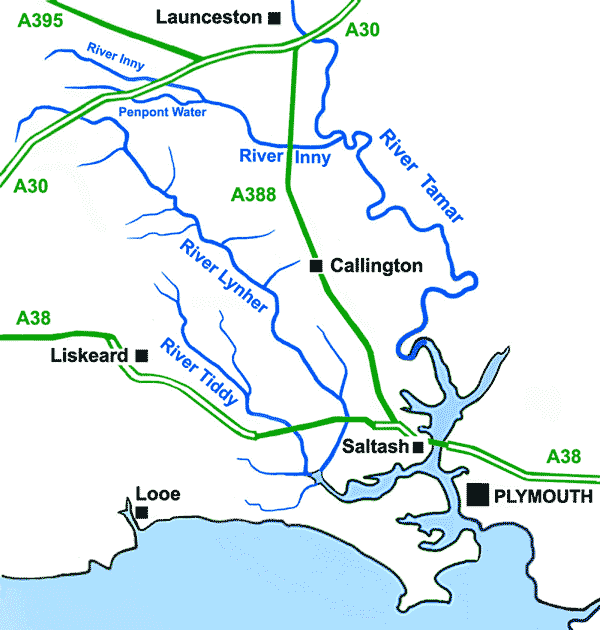
A sketchmap of the River Tamar showing tributaries including the River Inny

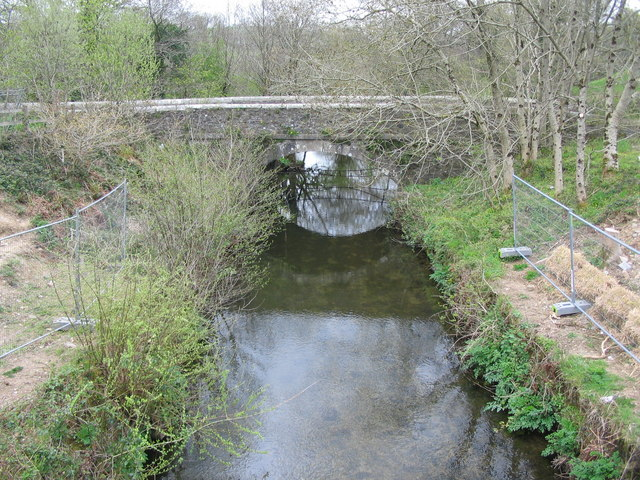
The road bridge at Two Bridges

Penpont Water (Cornish: Dowr Pennpons, meaning river at the head of a bridge) is a small river in east Cornwall, England, United Kingdom. It is the main tributary of the River Inny, joining it at Two Bridges.
