= Gloweth =

Housing estate in Cornwall, England

Coordinates: 50.261°N 5.096°W

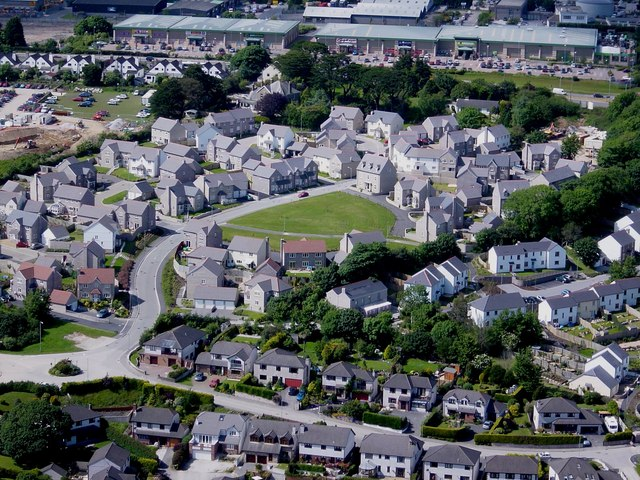
Gloweth from the air

Gloweth is a housing estate west of Treliske on the western outskirts of Truro in Cornwall, England.

There is an electoral ward named Threemilestone and Gloweth. At the 2011 census the population of this ward was 4,275 As of 2018, the ward population was 3,072.

== Etymology ==
Gloweth means the down with the barrows in the Cornish language.
