= Twelveheads =

Hamlet in Cornwall, England

Coordinates: 50.2387°N 5.1428°W

Twelveheads: Cornish: Dewdhek Stamp, meaning 'twelve stamps'
- Location within the United Kingdom
- OS grid reference: SW760424
- Civil parish: Chacewater
- Unitary authority: Cornwall
- Ceremonial county: Cornwall
- Country: UK
- Sovereign state: United Kingdom
- Post town: TRURO
- Postcode district: TR4
- Dialling code: 01872
- Police
- Fire
- Ambulance
- UK Parliament: Truro and Falmouth

Twelveheads (Cornish: Dewdhek Stamp) is a hamlet east of St Day in west Cornwall, United Kingdom. It lies in the parish of Chacewater, between Truro and Redruth.

== History and geography ==
The name comes from the hamlet's mining history. Sets of stamps (machines used for crushing ore) were once used on the dressing floors in the village. The stamps had a total of twelve 'heads'.

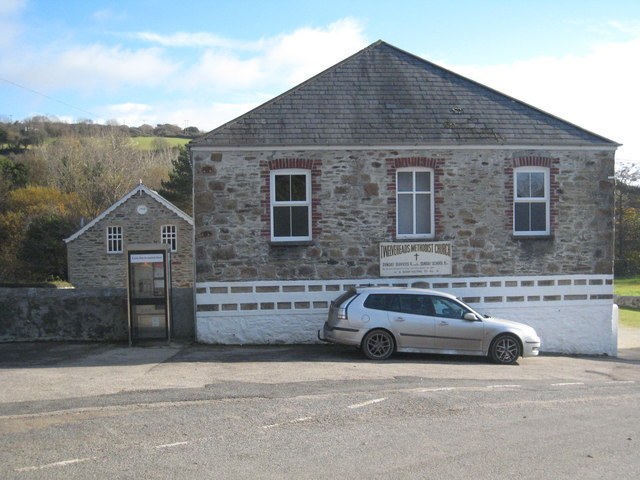
Twelveheads Methodist Church

Twelveheads has a Methodist chapel, a simple rectangular structure which is well decorated with a pipe organ in an organ chamber at the front of the chapel. The pipe organ can be found in the National Pipe Organ Register. Billy Bray, the Methodist preacher, was born here. The former village pub and post office are both now private housing.

Twelveheads is close to the Coast to Coast cycle route and the former mine known as Wheal Busy. There is also the 'Twelveheads Gate' into the Poldice Valley - the path of the mineral tramway, popular with cyclists, horseriders and walkers. About 500 yards to the south-east, down the Carnon Valley, is the portal of the Great County Adit that once drained all the mines in the locality.

== See also ==
- Twelveheads Press
