= Baldhu =

Village in Cornwall, England

Coordinates: 50.247°N 05.126°W

Baldhu: Cornish: Baldu
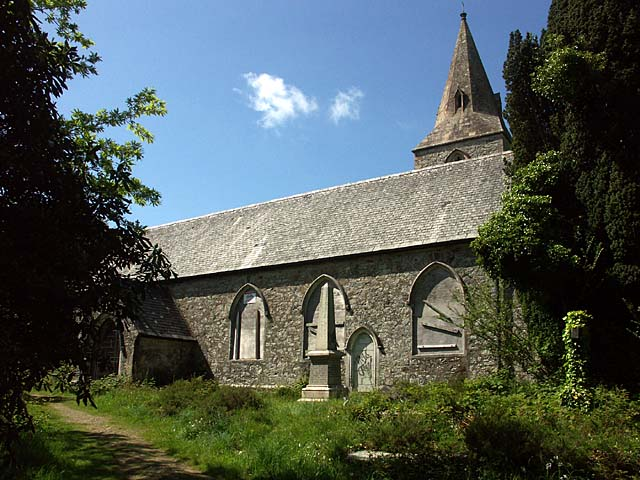
- Parish Church of Saint Michael and All Angels

- Location within Cornwall
- OS grid reference: SW7742
- Civil parish: Kea
- Shire county: Cornwall
- Region: South West
- Country: England
- Sovereign state: United Kingdom
- Post town: Truro
- Postcode district: TR3
- Police: Devon and Cornwall
- Fire: Cornwall
- Ambulance: South Western

Baldhu (/bælˈdjuː, bɔːl-/; Cornish: Baldu, meaning black mine) is a village and parish in Cornwall, England, United Kingdom. It is in the civil parish of Kea.

The parish church of Saint Michael and All Angels, designed by William White, is the burial place of Billy Bray, the revivalist preacher who was born at the nearby hamlet of Twelveheads. The church has been deconsecrated and the parish church is now All Saints, Highertown.

Baldhu is a former mining village (the name comes from the Cornish for 'black mine'; "bal" = mine) and it is situated above the Carnon Valley 3 miles (4.8 kilometres) west of Truro. The parish was created in 1847 out of parts of Kea and Kenwyn and the church of St Michael was built soon after.
