= Saveock =

Village in Cornwall, England

Coordinates: 50.2661°N 5.15055°W

Saveock is a hamlet in west Cornwall, England, United Kingdom. It lies just east of Chacewater.

Archaeologists have uncovered "witch pits" here dating from the 1640s up to the 1970s. These pits are shallow holes lined with the skins of animals turned inside out and other ritual items.
