= Wheal Busy =

Disused metalliferous mine in Cornwall, England

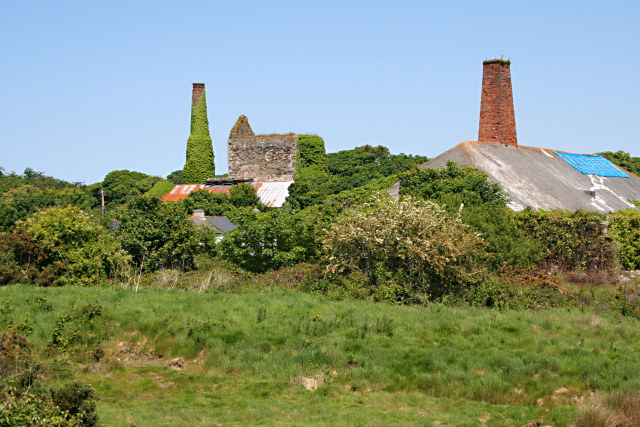
- Old mine buildings at Wheal Busy

- Location in Cornwall
- Location: Chacewater, Cornwall, England; 50°15′29″N 5°10′26″W
- Products: Mainly copper, tin and arsenic
- Opened: 16th century
- Closed: 1920s

Wheal Busy, sometimes called Great Wheal Busy and in its early years known as Chacewater Mine, was a metalliferous mine halfway between Redruth and Truro in the Gwennap mining area of Cornwall, England. During the 18th century the mine produced enormous amounts of copper ore and was very wealthy, but from the later 19th century onwards was not profitable. Today the site of the mine is part of the Cornwall and West Devon Mining Landscape, a UNESCO World Heritage Site.

== Geology ==
The country rock at the mine was killas and the mine's main product was copper, though arsenic and tin were also produced. There are several lodes at the mine, some of which were crossed by an elvan dyke, 15 to 40 ft (12 m) wide which in places was highly mineralized.

== Early history ==
There were probably mine workings in the area of Wheal Busy since the 16th century, but it was not until the 1720s that the mine started to produce large amounts of copper ore. The principal landowner was the Boscawen family. The mine was located in what was known at the time as "the richest square mile on Earth". During its life it produced over 100,000 tons of copper ore, and 27,000 tons of arsenic. The mine adopted the name of Wheal Busy after 1823. In 1836 it employed 34 men, 50 women working at the surface and 28 children, a total of 112 people. At one time the mine also smelted the copper ore it produced.

=== Steam engines ===
The mine suffered badly from underground water and in order to pump it out, one of the first Newcomen engines in Cornwall was installed by Joseph Hornblower in 1727. In 1775 this was replaced by a 72-inch engine designed by John Smeaton which was not very effective and was rebuilt by James Watt in 1778, making it one of the first Watt steam engines in the county. Also in 1778, the mine benefited from being connected to the Great County Adit, which also helped drainage.

== 1850 onwards ==
To celebrate a restarting of the mine in 1856, a "gargantuan feast" was held in the village of Chacewater. Watched by crowds, a thousand people marched through the village to the mine where the cornerstone for a large new engine house was laid. There was an excursion train on the West Cornwall Railway, a church service, a dinner was provided for 400 poor people, and at night there was a firework display. The feast itself took place in the marketplace and involved the roasting of a whole ox. Although large quantities of copper and tin ore were produced in the following ten years, no overall profit was made and the adventurers lost more than £150,000 in the mine.

In 1866 there was a wave of sabotage by some of the miners against the adventurers when in an attempt to reduce the mounting losses, a new mine captain imposed what amounted to a tax on their earnings. According to newspaper reports at the time the miners set about "attempting to blow up the boilers, laying trails of [gun]powder about the barracks, setting fire to the clothes in the dry, throwing large pieces of iron in the pumps, and other villainous acts." The mine closed down shortly afterwards.

In the 1850s the water drawn from the mine was being used for the steam engines, but it was so corrosive that each year six of the twenty four boilers had to be renewed. It was not until 1862 that a supply of clean water was arranged to solve this problem. The last significant production of copper ore from the mine was in 1866 (1,630 tons), though it sold small amounts (less than 100 tons) in each of the following three years. In 1873, in the middle of the slump in copper prices, the mine was reopened and a new 90 inch pumping engine was purchased from Perran Foundry, despite there being many second-hand engines cheaply available at the time. Only seven months after it started work the engine was up for sale and the mine had closed without producing any ore at all.

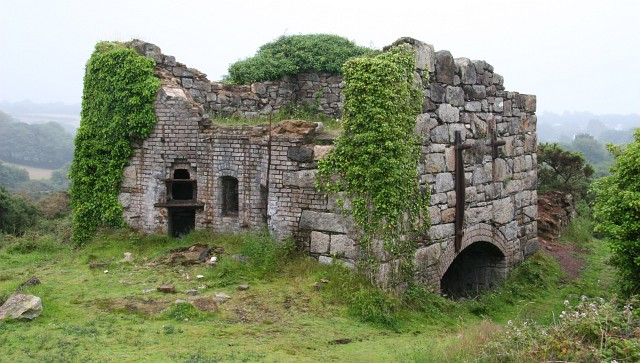
The remains of the Brunton calciner

In around 1910 the mine installed a second-hand 85 inch pumping engine, and to help with its production of arsenic, a Brunton calciner was built. In the 1920s a set of Californian stamps was installed to rework the waste dumps for ore. During the Second World War, 2,500 American GIs were billeted on the site and were said to have restarted the 85 inch pumping engine.

== Present day ==
Today, the site is part of the Cornwall and West Devon Mining Landscape World Heritage Site, lying within area A6i (The Gwennap-Chacewater Mining District). There are good remains of the Brunton calciner, and the concrete bases of the Californian stamps are prominent. A Mineral Tramways cycle path passes the mine.

The mine has been listed as a scheduled monument since 11 March 1974. Many of the buildings on the mine property have been listed as Grade II buildings: the engine house and arsenic calciner on 21 November 1985, the chapel for the mine on 14 April 1999, and the mine's smithy building on 7 December 2004. In 2011, it was determined that many of the mine's building were in need of restoration. Natural England's Higher Level Stewardship agreed to fund work on the engine house and associated buildings in 2014, and the project was completed in the summer of 2015. However, while the smithy building was also in need of work, the agency was not able to fund its restoration, but it was hoped there would be other means of funding the restoration of this building.

== Sources ==
- Barton, D. B. (1966). The Cornish Beam Engine. Truro: D. Bradford Barton Ltd.
- Barton, D. B. (1968). Essays in Cornish Mining History, Volume 1. Truro: D. Bradford Barton.
- Burt, Roger; Waite, Peter; Burnley, Ray (1987). Cornish Mines: Metalliferous and Associated Minerals 1845–1913. University of Exeter. ISBN 0-85989-287-5.
- Collins, Joseph Henry (1912). Observations on the West of England Mining Region. Joseph Henry Collins.
- Dines, H. G. (1956). The Metalliferous Mining Region of South-West England. Volume I. London: HMSO. pp. 389–391.
- Hancock, Peter (2008). The Mining Heritage of Cornwall and West Devon. Wellington, Somerset: Halsgrove. ISBN 978-1-84114-753-6.
