= Red River (Amal) =

River in Cornwall, England

Coordinates: 50.1267°N 5.4801°W

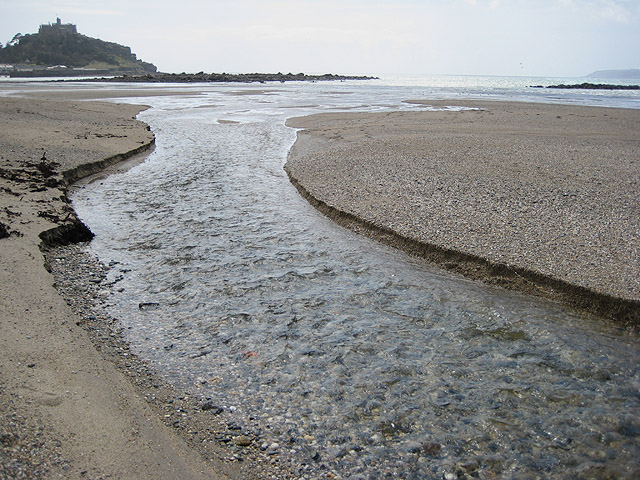
The mouth of the Red River

The Red River (Cornish: Dowr Amal, meaning boundary river) which discharges into the sea to the west of Marazion is one of two watercourses in Cornwall in southwest England, UK, which share this name.

It rises in the parish of Towednack and flows in a generally southeasterly direction, passing through the parish of Ludgvan before turning to the southwest and discharging into Mount's Bay. It is bridged by numerous minor roads and paths but also by the B3311 road, the A30 road, the rail line between Hayle and Penzance and the A394 road.
