= Shortlanesend and Allet =

Village in Cornwall, England

Coordinates: 50.288°N 5.077°W

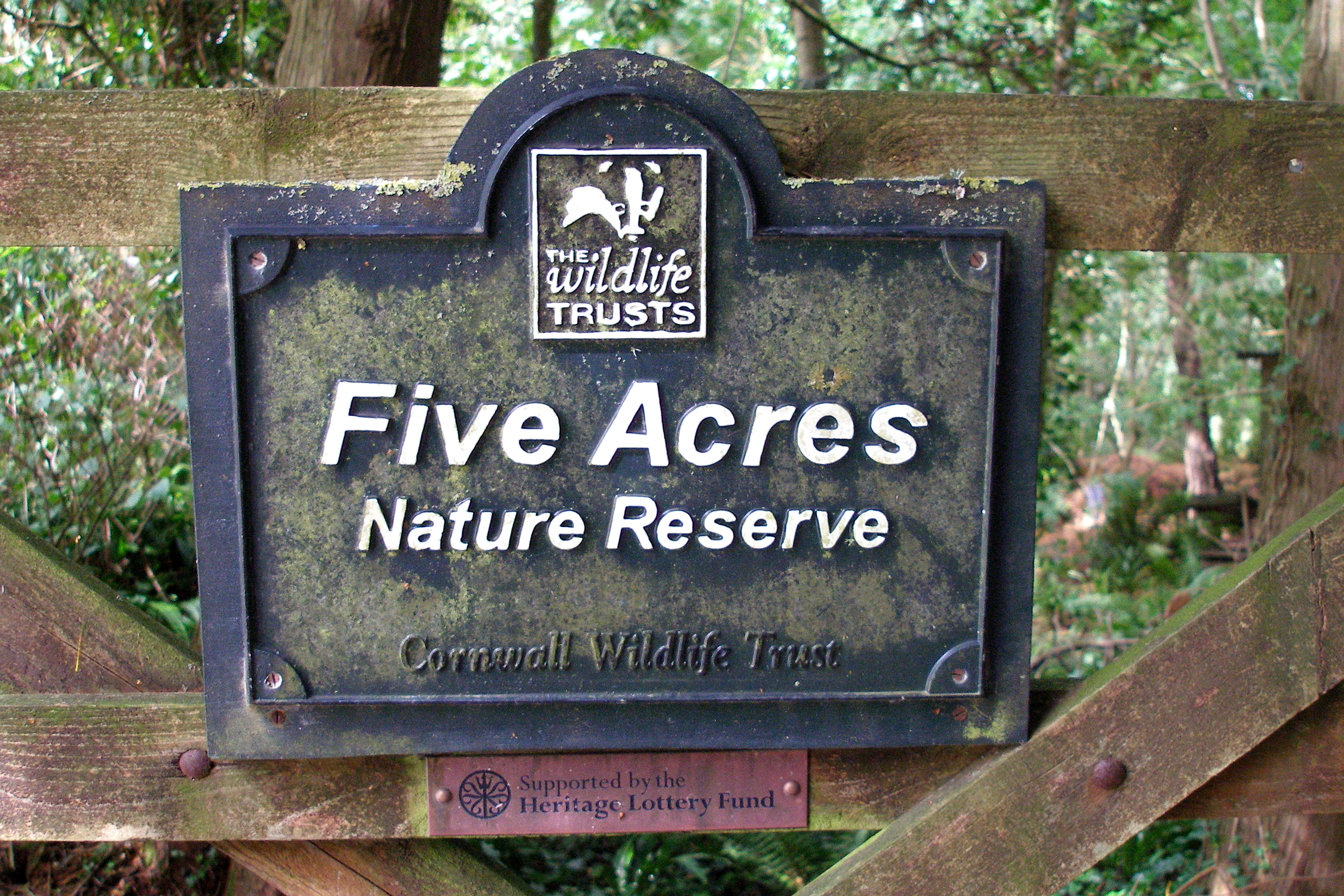
Five Acres Nature Reserve

Shortlanesend (Cornish: Penn an Vownder, meaning end of the lane) is a village in Kenwyn parish, Cornwall, England, United Kingdom. It lies two miles north of the city of Truro at grid reference SW 805 475. The name was recorded as Penfounder in 1547. Shortlanesend is in the former Carrick District. The village has a Methodist chapel, village hall, pub, the Old Plough Inn, a post office and primary school.

Allet (Cornish: Ales) is a hamlet one mile west of Shortlanesend on the B3284 Truro to Chiverton Cross road. The name was recorded as Aled in 1284. The Cornwall Wildlife Trust is based at Allet: its headquarters and offices are adjacent to the Trust's Five Acres nature reserve. This reserve includes two ponds, as well as mixed broadleaved woodland.
