= Chacewater =

Village and civil parish in Cornwall, England

Coordinates: 50.257°N 5.157°W

Chacewater: Cornish: Dowr an Chas
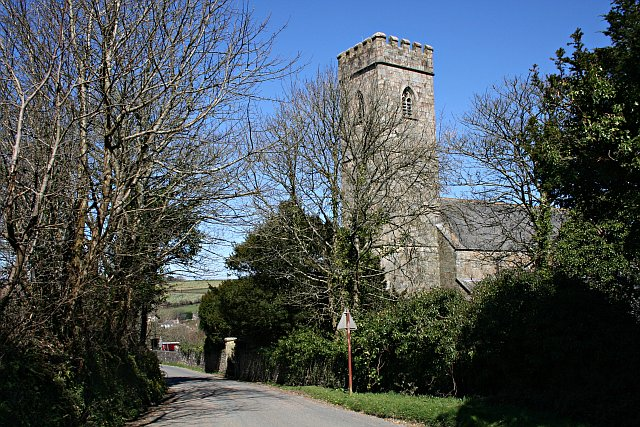
- Chacewater church

- Location within Cornwall
- Population: 1,666 (Civil Parish, 2011)
- OS grid reference: SW751444
- Civil parish: Chacewater
- Unitary authority: Cornwall
- Ceremonial county: Cornwall
- Region: South West
- Country: England
- Sovereign state: United Kingdom
- Post town: TRURO
- Postcode district: TR4
- Dialling code: 01872
- Police: Devon and Cornwall
- Fire: Cornwall
- Ambulance: South Western
- UK Parliament: Truro and Falmouth

Chacewater (Cornish: Dowr an Chas, meaning river of the hunting ground) is a village and civil parish in Cornwall, England, UK. It is situated approximately 3 miles (4.8 km) east of Redruth. The hamlets of Carnhot, Cox Hill, Creegbrawse, Hale Mills, Jolly's Bottom, Salem, Saveock, Scorrier, Todpool, Twelveheads and Wheal Busy are in the parish. At the 2011 census a population of 3,870 was quoted.

== Village ==
Chacewater sits in a valley between hills separating it from the villages of Threemilestone, Scorrier and St Day. Nearby is Wheal Busy, the Poldice Valley and the Coast to Coast cycle route. The village has a pub and a club, the Chacewater Literary Institute. There are also a health centre, primary school, village hall and small selection of shops.

A free monthly magazine What's on in Chacewater reached its 200th issue in July 2007. It lists events and activities, such as the Football Club, a Cricket Club, a Bowling Club, the Chacewater Old Cornwall Society, the Chacewater Players, the Carnival (held in August), the Blind Club and a Women's Institute. The Kernow Microscopical Society meets in Chacewater.

== Churches ==
The Anglican church is dedicated to St Paul; it was built in 1828 and rebuilt (apart from the tower) in 1892 by Edmund H. Sedding. The stonework is partly of granite and partly of Polyphant stone: the interior is lofty and the walls unplastered.

On 29 April 1880 a new organ was installed, for £120, in the Methodist Chapel by Mr Hele of Hele & Co, Plymouth.

== Economy and transport ==
Chacewater railway station was opened by the West Cornwall Railway on 25 August 1852 but long since closed. The station closed to passengers on 5 October 1964 but continued to be served by goods traffic for many years, latterly for Blue Circle Cement. The Penzance bound platforms can still be seen, complete with a much altered station building. Great Western Railway and CrossCountry services run through the station on the Cornish Main Line.

Roseland House Nursery, which holds a National Collection of Clematis viticella cultivars and of Lapageria rosea, the Chilean Bellflower, is located in the village.

== Cornish wrestling ==
There were Cornish wrestling tournaments in Chacewater, for prizes, for at least the last couple of centuries. Tournaments were held in the field adjoining the Crown Inn and the recreation ground.

Richard Williams(1851-1892) was born in Chacewater and was known throughout the world as 'Schiller Williams' after surviving the wreck of the Schiller and helping save some of the other few survivors. He was a famous, champion wrestler in Cornwall, the US, England, Northern Ireland, Bolivia and Mexico. He became lightweight champion of Cornwall in 1887 after beating William Lucking in Wales. He was Western states champion in the US. He died in Mexico.

See also wrestling in Penstraze.

== Notable people ==
See also Category:People from Chacewater.

- Jonathan Hornblower (1753–1815), pioneer of steam power.
- Matthew Paul Moyle (1788–1880), the meteorologist, geologist and writer on mining.
- John Robarts (c.1818–1888), recipient of the Victoria Cross, a Royal Navy gunner in the Crimean War
- Andrew Ketcham Barnett (1852–1914), a mineral collector and dealer, Mayor of Penzance and president of the Royal Geological Society of Cornwall.

== Gallery ==
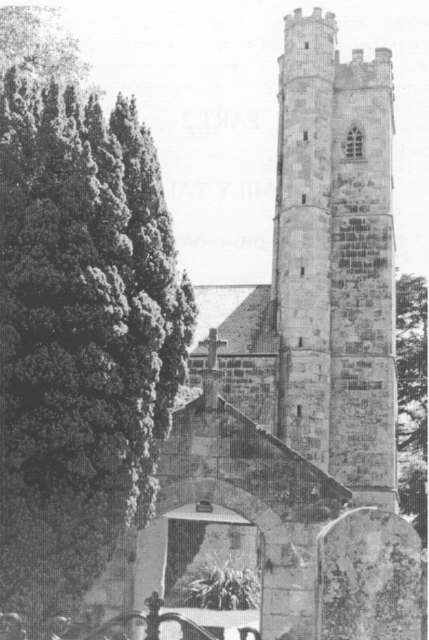
St Paul's Church

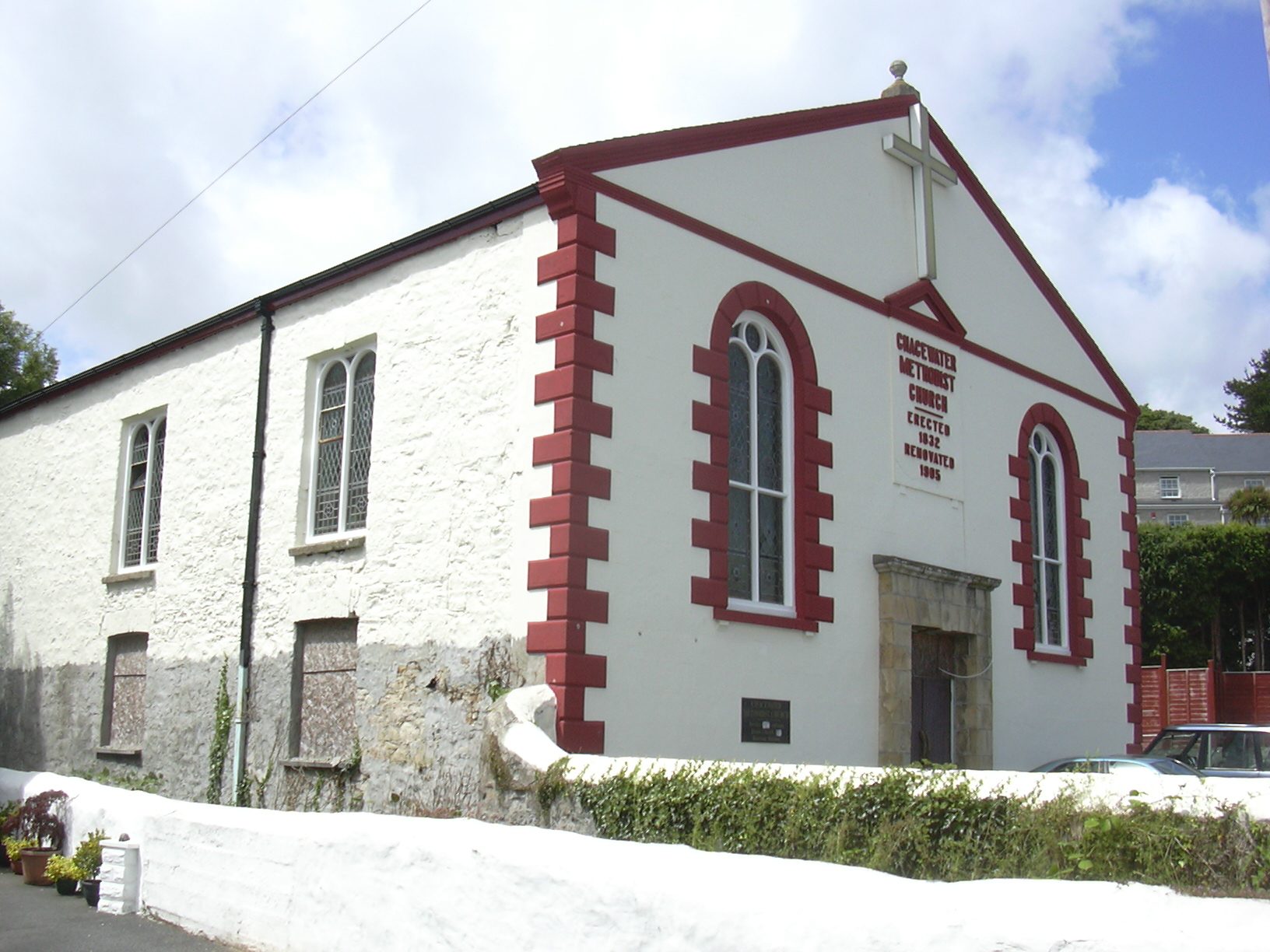
Chacewater Methodist Church

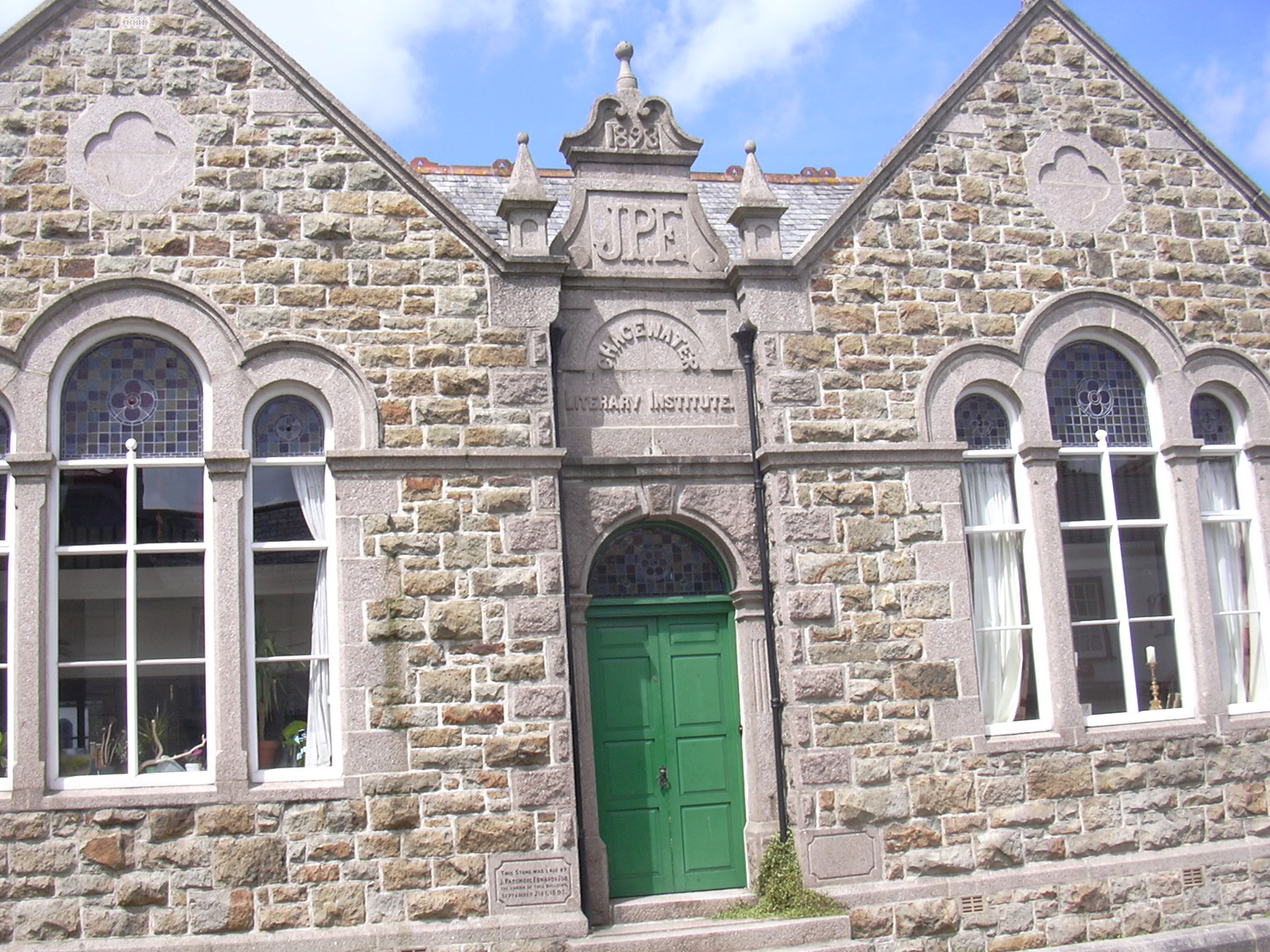
Chacewater Literary Institute

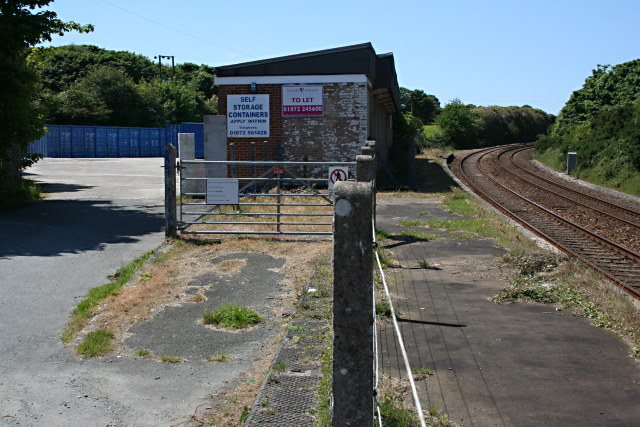
Chacewater railway station on the Cornish Main Line, not reopened yet.

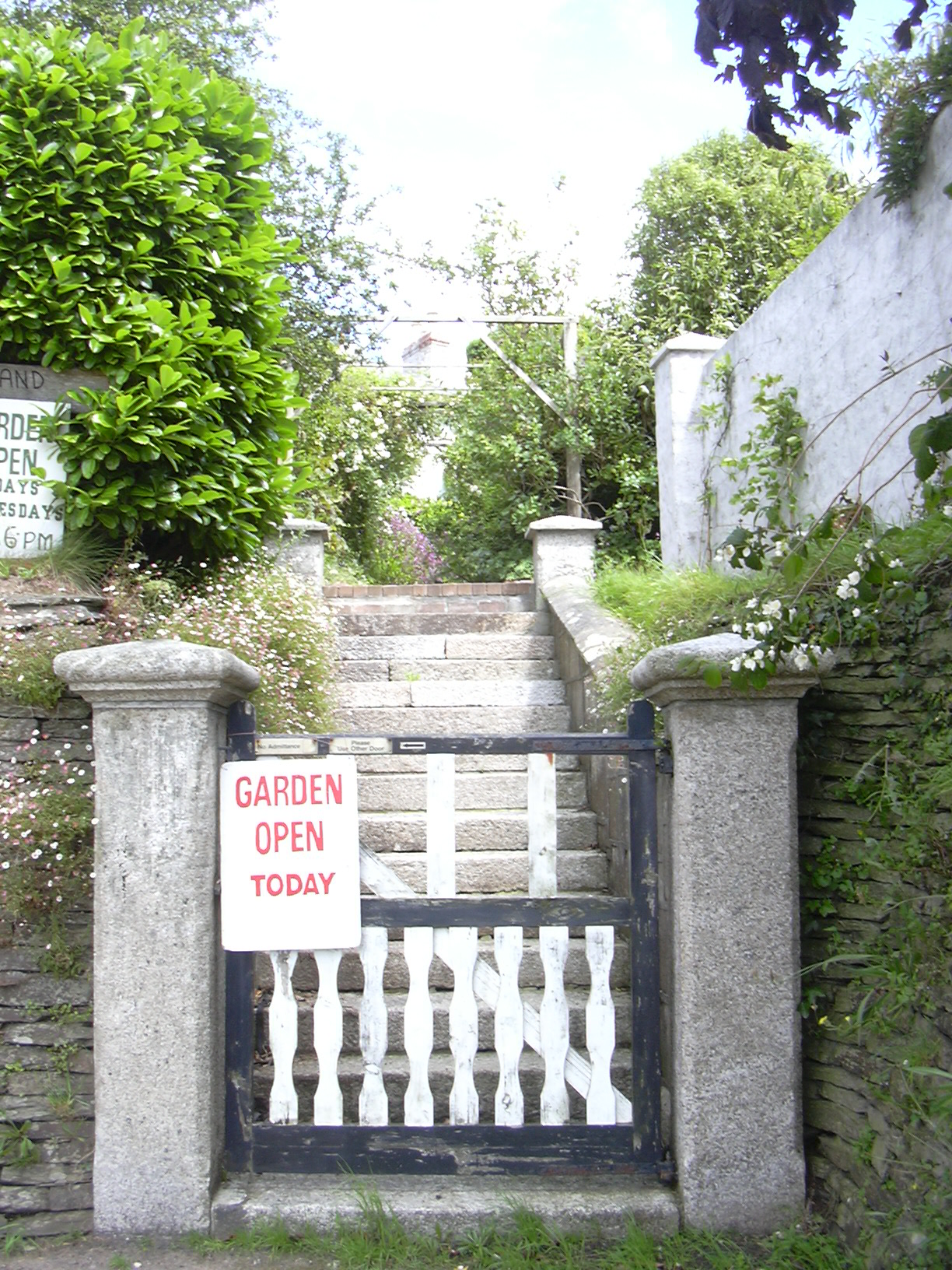
Roseland Nursery Garden

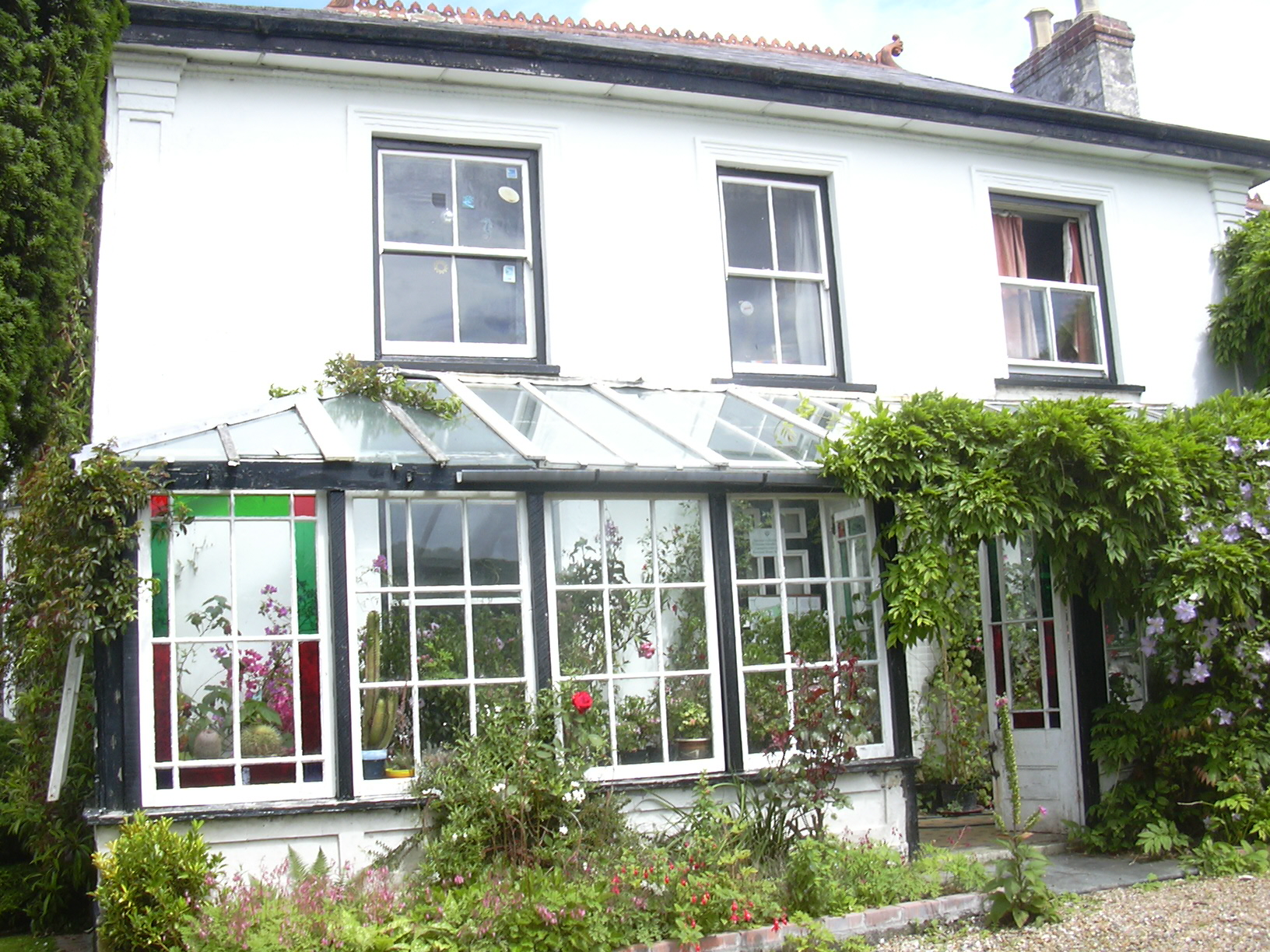
Roseland House

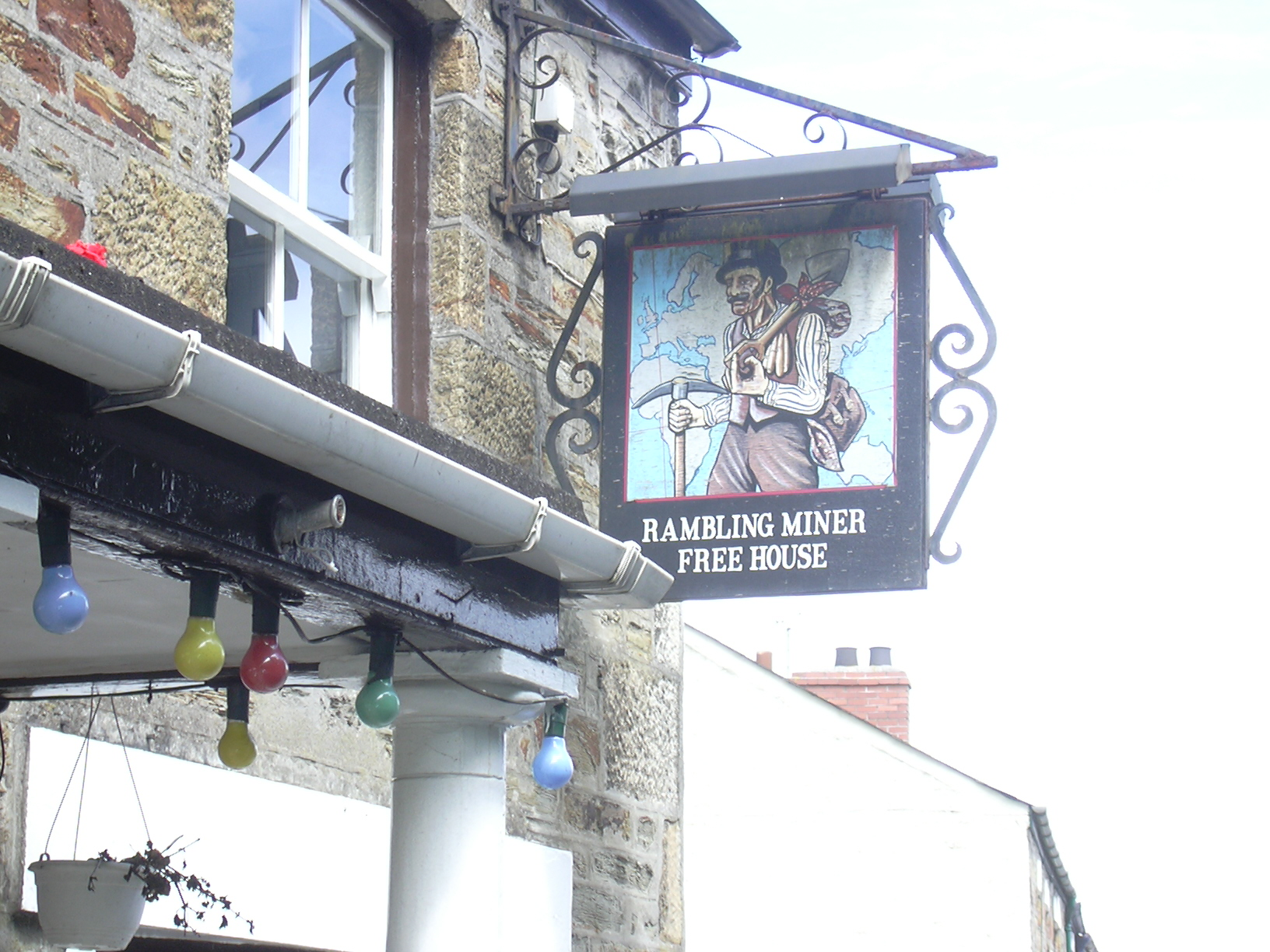
"The Rambling Miner"

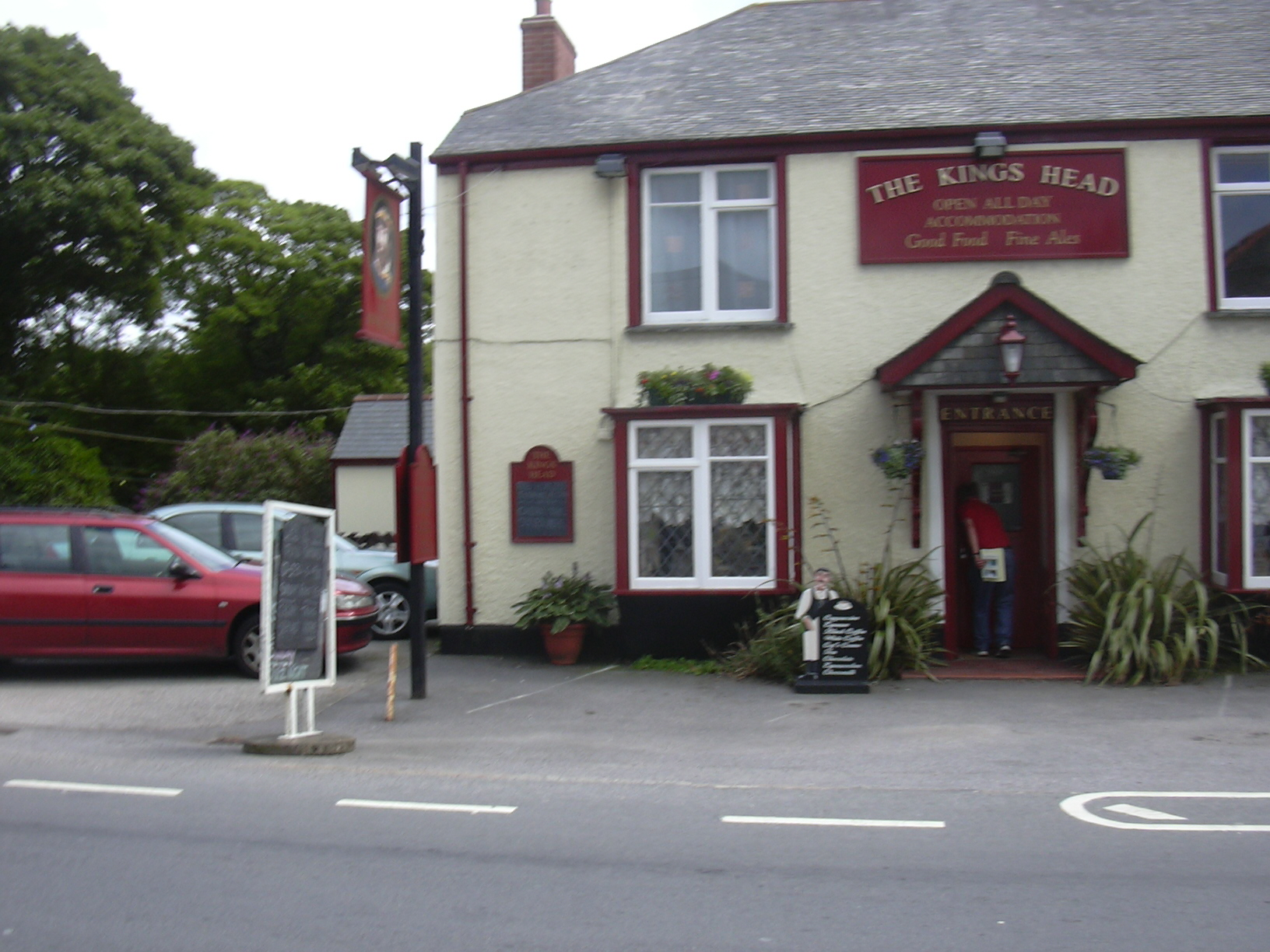
"The King's Head"

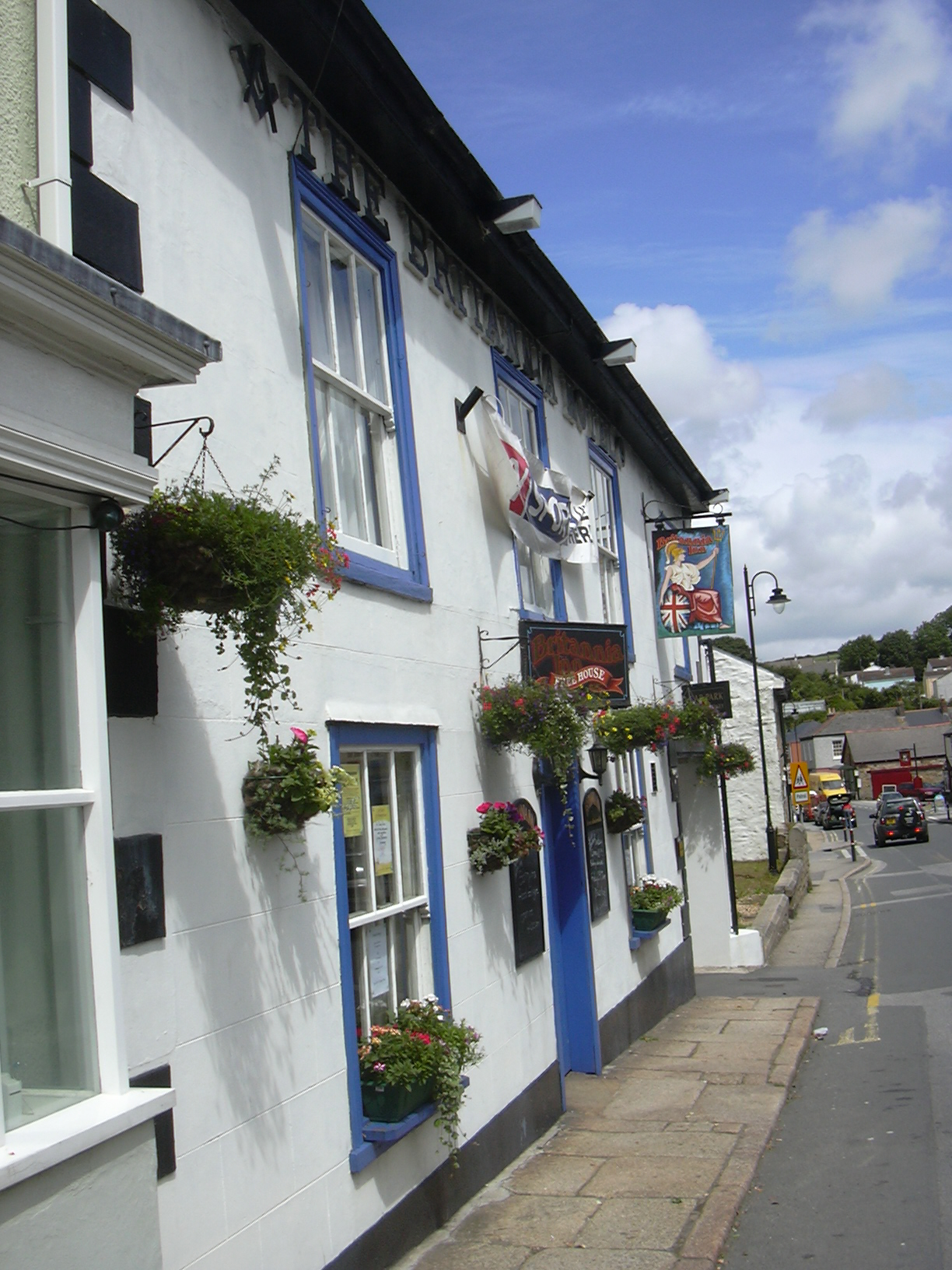
"The Britannia"

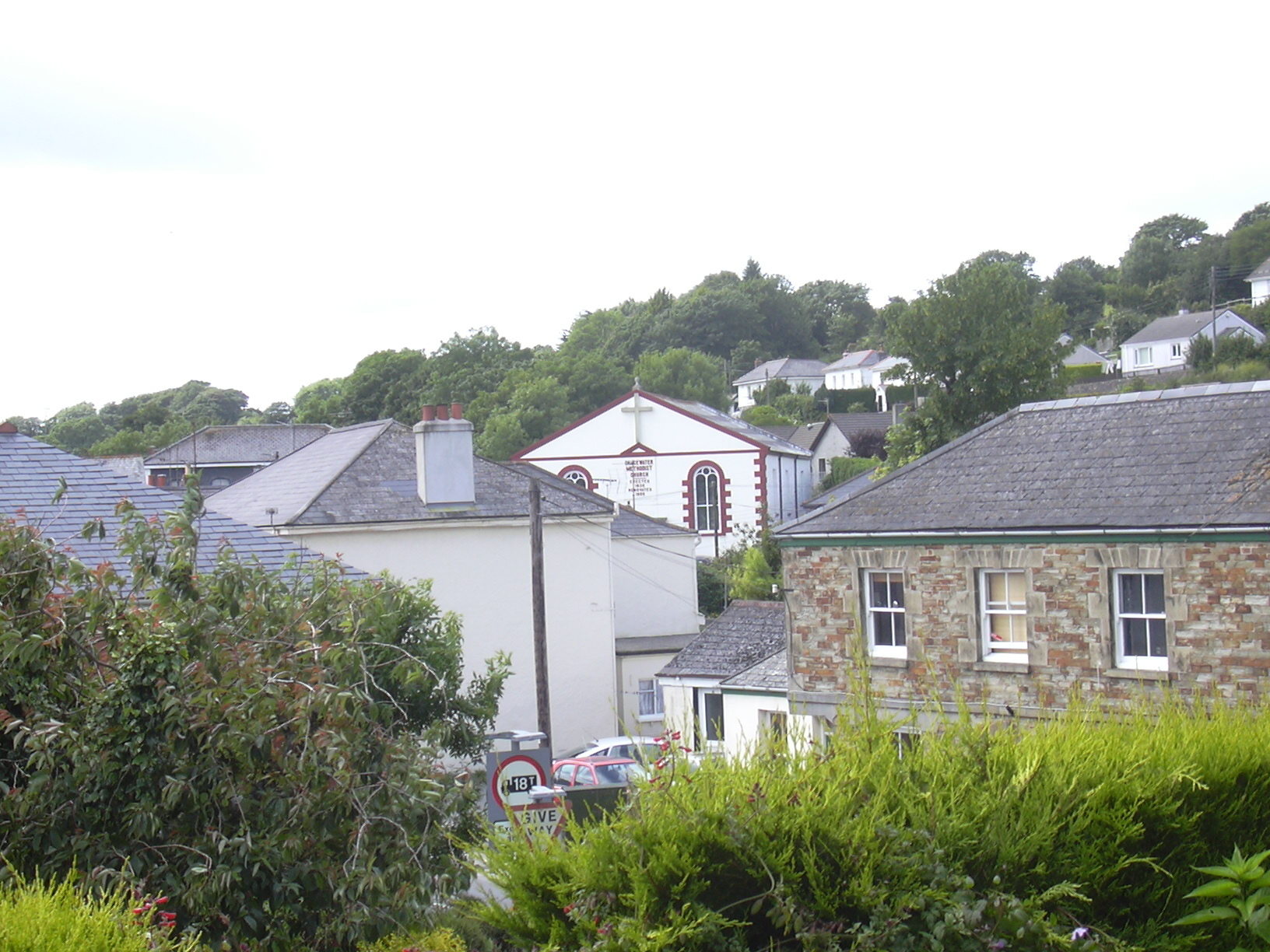
Chacewater Village from Chacewater Hill

== See also ==
- Killifreth Mine – a former mine nearby
- Wheal Busy – a nearby disused metalliferous mine formerly called Chacewater mine
- Wheal Jane – a nearby disused tin mine
