= Feock and Kea (electoral division) =

Electoral division of Cornwall in the UK

- ward Cornwall Council
- Boundary of Feock and Kea in Cornwall from 2021.
- County: Cornwall

Current ward
- Created: 2021
- Councillor: Martyn Alvey (Conservative)
- Number of councillors: One
- Created from: Chacewater, Kenwyn and Baldhu; Feock and Playing Place

Feock and Kea is an electoral division of Cornwall in the United Kingdom which returns one member to sit on Cornwall Council. It was created at the 2021 local elections, being created from the former divisions of Chacewater, Kenwyn and Baldhu, and Feock and Playing Place. The current councillor is Martyn Alvey, a Conservative.

== Boundaries ==
Feock and Kea represents the entirety of the parish of Feock and the parish of Kea. The parish of Feock includes the villages of Carnon Downs, Chycoose, Devoran, Feock, Goon Piper, Harcourt, Killiganoon, Penelewey, Penpol, Porthgwidden, Restronguet Point, Trevilla, and Trelissick. The parish of Kea includes the villages of Baldhu, Bissoe, Calenick, Come-to-Good, Helston Water, Kea, Killiow, Nansavallan, Playing Place, and Porth Kea.

== Councillors ==
Election	Member	Party
2021	Martyn Alvey	Conservative

== Election results ==
=== 2021 election ===
Feock and Kea
Party	Candidate	Votes	%	±%
Conservative	Martyn Alvey (Note: Incumbent councillor, formerly representing Feock and Playing Place)	1,266	59.1	N/A
Green	Charmian Larke	395	18.4	N/A
Liberal Democrats	Thomas Grafton	290	13.5	N/A
Labour	Robin Dowell	192	9.0	N/A
Majority		871	40.6	N/A
Rejected ballots		24	1.1	N/A
Turnout		2,167		N/A
Conservative win (new seat)				
