= Feock and Playing Place (electoral division) =

Former electoral division of Cornwall in the UK

- Former ward Cornwall Council
- Boundary of Feock and Playing Place in from 2013-2021.
- County: Cornwall

2013–2021
- Number of councillors: One
- Replaced by: Feock and Kea
- Created from: Feock and Kea; Chacewater and Kenwyn

Feock and Playing Place (Cornish: Lannfyek ha Plen an Gwari) was an electoral division of Cornwall in the United Kingdom which returned one member to sit on Cornwall Council from 2013 to 2021. It was abolished at the 2021 local elections, being succeeded by Feock and Kea.

== Councillors ==
| Election | Member | Party |
|---|---|---|
| 2013 | Steve Chamberlain | Conservative |
| 2017 | Martyn Alvey | Conservative |
| 2021 | Seat abolished | |

== Extent ==
Feock and Playing Place represented the villages of Carnon Downs, Devoran, Feock, Coombe and Playing Place, and the hamlets of Ringwell, Penpol, Harcourt, Goonpiper, Penelewey, Trelissick, Cowlands and Calenick. The division covered 1997 hectares in total.

== Election results ==
=== 2017 election ===
2017 election: Feock and Playing Place
| Party | Candidate | Votes | % | ±% |
|---|---|---|---|---|
| Conservative | Martyn Alvey | 894 | 46.5 | |
| Independent | Bob Richards | 617 | 32.1 | |
| Liberal Democrats | Ian Macdonald | 402 | 20.9 | |
| Majority | | 277 | 14.4 | |
| Rejected ballots | | 9 | 0.5 | |
| Turnout | | 1922 | 50.1 | |
| Conservative hold | | Swing | | |

=== 2013 election ===
2013 election: Feock and Playing Place
| Party | Candidate | Votes | % | ±% |
|---|---|---|---|---|
| Conservative | Steve Chamberlain | 801 | 69.3 | |
| Liberal Democrats | Christine Ryall | 183 | 15.8 | |
| Labour | Jayne Kirkham | 138 | 11.9 | |
| Majority | | 618 | 53.5 | |
| Rejected ballots | | 34 | 2.9 | |
| Turnout | | 1156 | 29.7 | |
| Conservative win (new seat) | | | | |
