= Fal River Links =

Fal River Links is a group of ferry and boat services serving the River Fal and Carrick Roads in Cornwall, England. The services include

- a year-round passenger ferry between Falmouth and Flushing
- a year-round passenger ferry between Falmouth and St Mawes
- seasonal boat services from Falmouth to Feock (for the National Trust property at Trelissick) and Malpas.

There are also occasional services from Falmouth to Truro, which depend on tidal conditions in the Truro River.

== See also ==
- King Harry Ferry
