= Restronguet =

Restronguet is in south Cornwall in the United Kingdom and gives its name to:

- Restronguet Creek, a tidal ria
- Restronguet Passage, a waterside hamlet
- Restronguet Point, a small headland and coastal settlement
- Restronguet Sailing Club, a club at Mylor Churchtown
