= Tolverne Cottage =

Cottage in Philleigh, Cornwall, England

- Smugglers Cottage
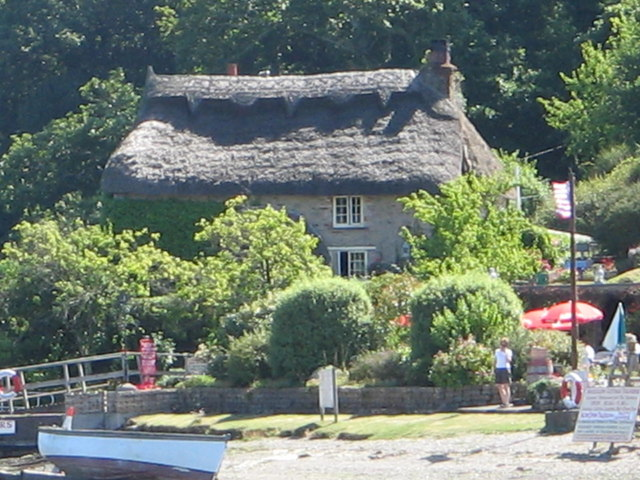

- Location within Cornwall
- 50.22253°N 5.02193°W
- Location: Philleigh, Cornwall, England

Listed Building – Grade II
- Official name: The Smugglers Cottage of Tolverne
- Designated: 25 June 1985
- Reference no.: 1328917

Tolverne Cottage, also known as Smugglers Cottage, is a small Grade II-listed cottage in south Cornwall, England. It is situated within the civil parish of Philleigh, on the Roseland Peninsula on the River Fal, between Truro and St Mawes, north of the King Harry Ferry. Made from slatestone rubble, the building probably dates from the 17th century, but was extended in the 19th century. It was designated Grade II listed status on 25 June 1985.

The area was used as the assembly point for American troops before the D-Day landings and General Eisenhower stayed at the cottage during preparations for the landing. His chair was amongst memorabilia at the cottage which was auctioned off in 2012. The cottage was also frequented by members of the SS Uganda society while the ship was laid up nearby in the Fal.

== History ==
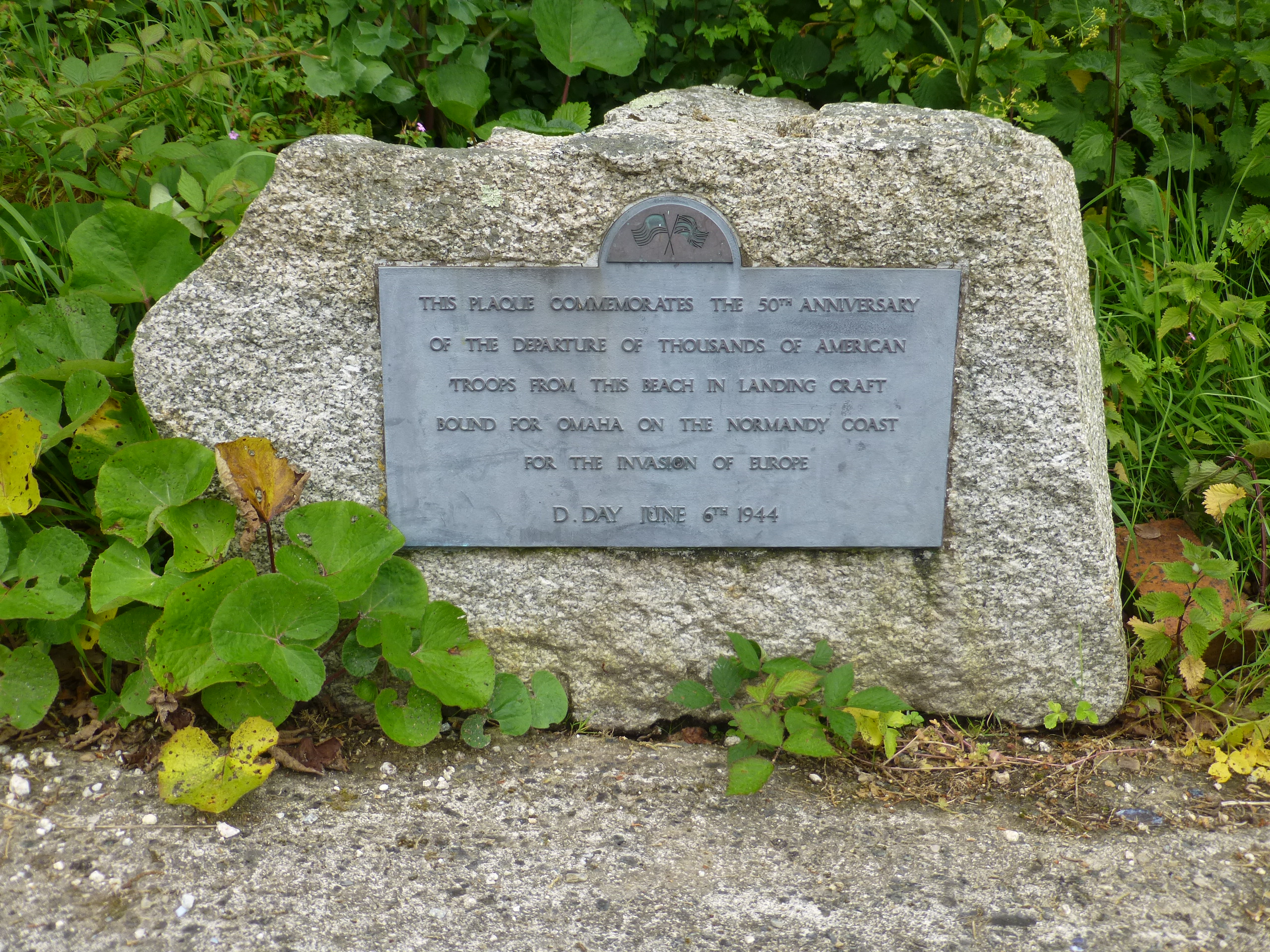
The D-Day memorial

On the opposite side of the River Fal to the National Trust property, Trelissick, stands Tolverne Cottage. The cottage was run for many years as a tea room, which sold tea grown on the Tregothnan estate, the first tea plantation in the UK. There is a regular ferry which connects the cottage to Falmouth during the summer.

In preparation for the D-Day landings, some 27,000 American troops gathered in the Fal Estuary, and General Eisenhower stayed at Smugglers Cottage. A granite memorial stone was placed outside the cottage to commemorate the D-Day landings.

The building contained a collection of memorabilia related to the landings, including Eisenhower's chair preserved in one of the rooms but the collection was put up for auction in 2012. The auction raised a total of £10,000, including a telegraph from the Torpoint ferry which sold for £1,700. Eisenhower's chair sold for £480.

On return to the UK, the SS Uganda was laid up in the Fal near Smugglers Cottage, so the society of devotees of the ship frequented the cottage.

== Architecture ==
The two-storey cottage was probably built for fishermen in the 17th or 18th century and enlarged in the 19th. Its walls are slatestone rubble and the roof is wheat reed thatched. It is hipped to the left with a rubble chimney on the right gable end and another gable at the end of the rear wing with a brick chimney. The original cottage had two rooms, with another two rooms added at the rear that formed an L shape that is slightly set back. The angle was later filled in. There is one window in the south front that may have been the original rear of the cottage. There is a nearly central doorway with a two-casement window to the right with eighteen panes. The cottage was listed on 25 June 1985 by English Heritage.
