= Saint Kea =

5th century British saint

Confessor
- Born: probably Lothian
- Died: early 6th century Cleder, Brittany
- Venerated in: Catholic Church; Anglican Communion;Eastern Orthodox Church;
- Major shrine: Cleder, Brittany
- Feast: 5 November
- Attributes: hermit with a stag

Kea (Breton and Cornish: Ke; French: Ké) was a late 5th-century British saint from the Hen Ogledd ("Old North")—the Brythonic-speaking parts of what is now southern Scotland and northern England. According to tradition he was chiefly active in Cornwall, Devon and Brittany, and his cult was popular in those regions as well as throughout Wales and the West Country. Fili or Filius, to whom the parish church of Philleigh is dedicated, probably came from Wales and is said to have been a companion of Kea.

== Legend ==
Saint Kea assumed travels

Kea is chiefly known through a French summary of a lost Latin hagiography written by Maurice of Cleder in the 17th century, as well as Beunans Ke, an incomplete 16th-century Cornish-language play rediscovered in 2000.

According to these, he was the son of King Lleuddun Luyddog of Lothian, and served as bishop in North Britain before moving on to become a hermit. He first went to Wales and then moved south, founding churches at Street, Somerset and Landkey, Devon. He finally settled at Old Kea in Cornwall, which was subsequently named for him.

He was harassed by the Cornish king, Teudar, when he sheltered a deer that Teudar was hunting. Having his oxen confiscated, he used the deer to plow the soil instead. He later travelled over the Channel to Cleder in Brittany, where he eventually died. In Brittany, he is known as "Saint Quay".

The work also describes Kea's dealings with King Arthurs passage probably explains the Arthurian section in Beunans Ke, which describes Arthur's conflict with the Roman emperor Lucius Hiberius and Mordred's subsequent treachery.

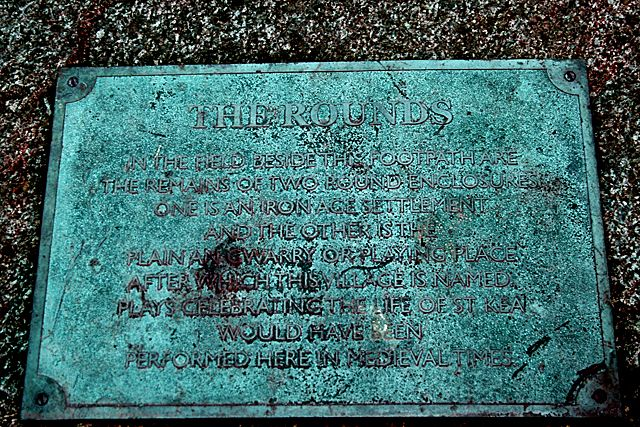
Plaque at Playing Place

An alternate legend describes Kea as an Irish monk, who, standing on the shore watching Christian missionaries depart for Cornwall, prayed that he not be left behind. At that point, the granite slab upon which he stood began to float and carried him across. A similar tale is told of Piran, who is said to have floated safely over the water to land upon the sandy beach of Perranzabuloe in Cornwall.

Plays featuring Kea were performed at Playing Place, where a plaque marks the plain-an-gwarry field in which they were staged.
