= Carnon Mine =

Tin mine in Cornwall, England

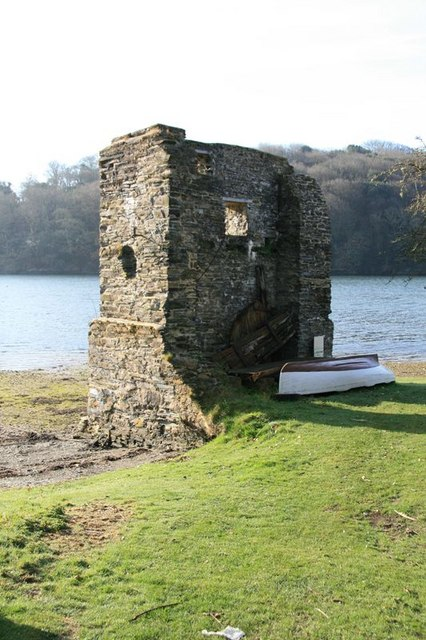

- Location within Cornwall
- 50°12′30″N 5°4′50″W
- Location: Devoran, Cornwall
- OS grid reference: SW 803 388

History
- Built: 1824

Listed Building – Grade II
- Official name: Carnon Mine Engine House
- Designated: 12 March 1986
- Reference no.: 1159123

Carnon Mine was a tin mine at Restronguet Creek, near the village of Devoran in Cornwall, England. A ruined engine house survives on the north bank of the creek. It is a Grade II listed building.

== History ==
The tin mine opened in 1824. The surviving engine house is thought to have housed an engine of cylinder diameter 24 inches. An artificial island was created in the estuary; shafts, in the form of cast iron cylinders made at Perran Foundry, were sunk there, and a 14-inch engine and horse whim erected. Water was pumped from the mine by the engine on the estuary bank via flatrods.

The mine was profitable, but closed in 1830; the Redruth and Chasewater Railway complained that boats using the creek were obstructed.

== Description ==
The south-east wall and parts of the north-east and south-west walls of the engine house survive, to a height of two storeys of the original three storeys. The south-west wall, the "bob wall" that supported the beam of the beam engine, is thicker than the others.

== See also ==
- Mining in Cornwall and Devon
