= River Fal =

River in Cornwall, England

Coordinates: 50°15′N 4°57′W

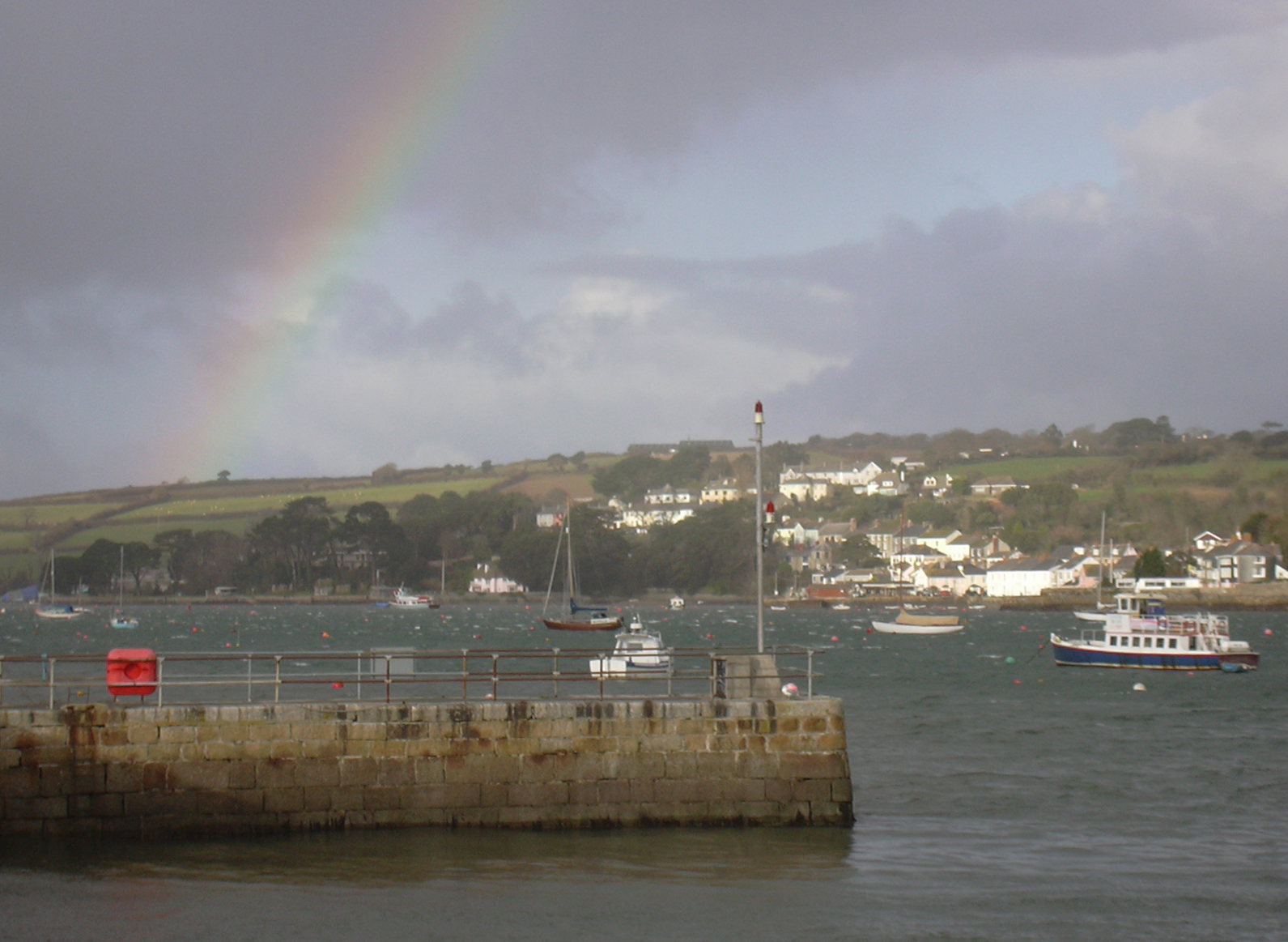
- Flushing, from Fish Strand Quay, Falmouth, with rainbow
- Native name: Dowr Fala (Cornish)

Physical characteristics
- Source
  - location: Goss Moor
- Mouth
  - location: Carrick Roads
- Length: 29 km (18 mi)

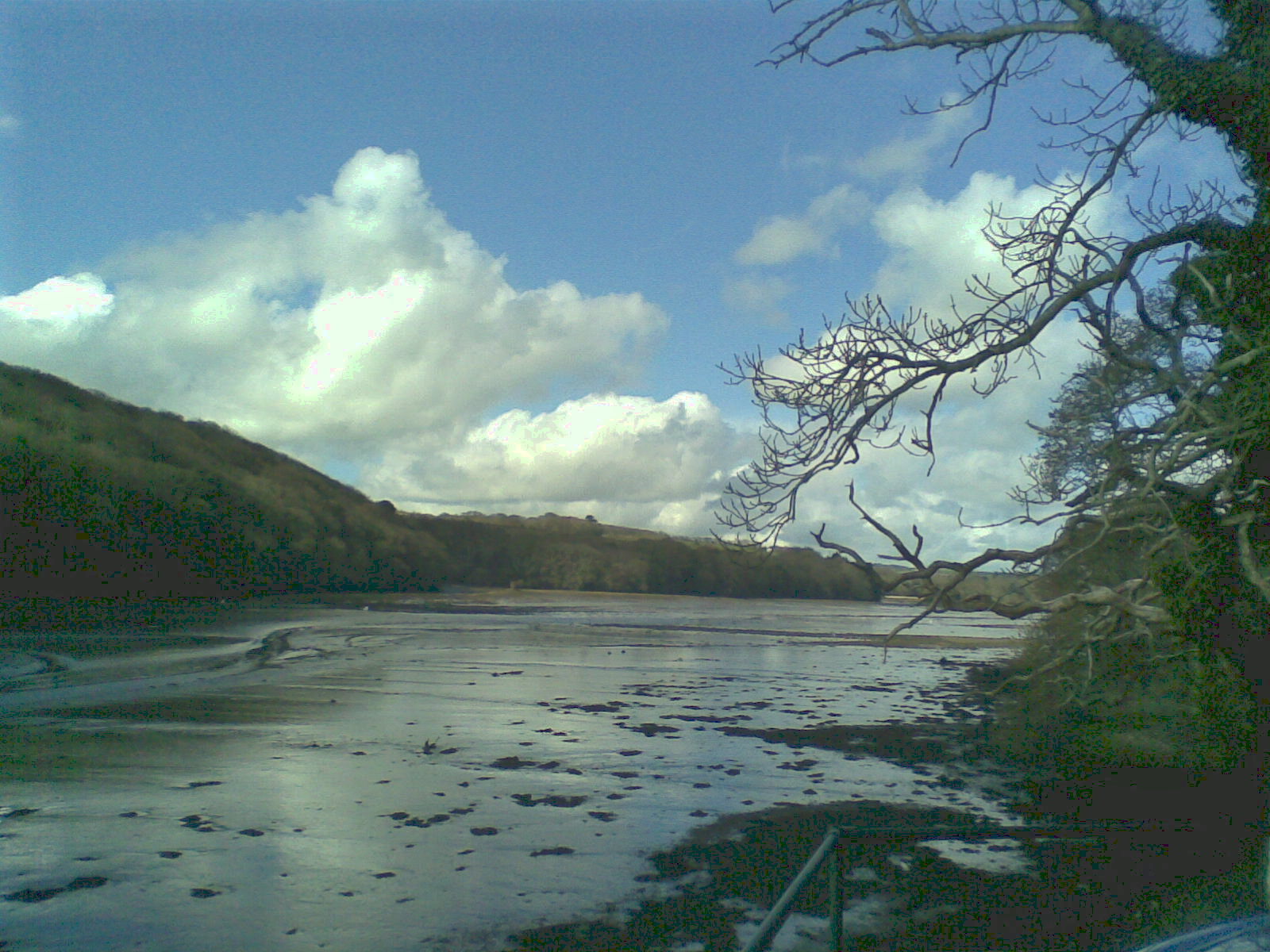
The River Fal at Devoran

The River Fal (Cornish: Dowr Fala) flows through Cornwall, rising at Pentevale on Goss Moor (between St. Columb and Roche) and reaching the English Channel at Falmouth. On or near the banks of the Fal are the castles of Pendennis and St Mawes as well as Trelissick. The River Fal separates the Roseland peninsula from the rest of Cornwall. Like most of its kind on the south coast of Cornwall and Devon, the Fal estuary is a classic ria, or drowned river valley. The Fal estuary from Tregony to the Truro River was originally called Hafaraell (Cornish: Havarel, meaning 'fallow place').

== Toponymy ==
The origin and meaning of the name of the river are unknown. The earliest occurrences of the name are in documents from AD 969 and 1049. Falmouth is named after the River Fal. The word fal in Cornish may refer to a prince, or perhaps to a spade or shovel. Robert Williams notes these meanings in his 1865 Cornish dictionary. However, he notes fâl as the word pâl after undergoing aspirate mutation; and a word fal meaning 'prince', but apparently a ghost word. He does not link either of these to the name of the river Fal.

== History ==
The river mouth and Falmouth harbour served as an anchorage in the immediate years after the Second World War for scores of laid-up Royal Navy vessels (including battleships, carriers, and cruisers) awaiting sale for scrap. Its size and depth of water made it ideal for this use.

The River Fal suffered a severe, high-profile pollution accident in February 1992, when a nearby tin mine was flooded. The river turned red and an extensive cleaning-up operation was needed to decontaminate the water. During times of reduced global trade, ships are mothballed in the upper parts of the estuary of the River Fal. The ships, using the Fal estuary due to its depth and protection from the elements, keep a skeleton crew for ship maintenance. A large number of ships were moored in the estuary during the Great Recession, as falling global trade meant a smaller demand for cargo ships. Falmouth Harbour authority charges companies for usage of the river, until the ships are either reactivated, scrapped or sold.

== Geography and hydrology ==
The source can be traced to Pentivale (Cornish: Pennfenten Fala, meaning head spring of the Fal). The catchment of the Fal is predominantly Devonian slates, shales and grits, with granite in the upper reaches. Land use is mainly agricultural with some woodland.

Tributaries of the River Fal include the Truro River, River Kennal, Penryn River and Carnon River. Several tidal creeks discharge into the River Fal including Mylor Creek, Pill Creek, Penpol Creek, the Percuil River and Restronguet Creek. The Fal/Truro waterway is navigable between Falmouth and Truro. The River Fal is crossed by the King Harry Ferry, a vehicular chain ferry that links the villages of Feock and Philleigh approximately equidistant between Truro and Falmouth. The river flows through the Carrick Roads, a large ria that creates a natural harbour. Here, pedestrian ferries connect Falmouth with St Mawes.

== Wildlife and conservation ==
Five Sites of Special Scientific Interest (SSSI) have been designated along the River Fal. The river rises on Goss Moor which is both a National Nature Reserve and part of a SSSI. The wetland habitats and western dry heath communities were formed, since the Bronze Age, by the mining of the alluvial tin deposits. South Terras Mine SSSI is also a Geological Conservation Review (GCR) site of national importance and was once a commercial uranium mine. The Crowhill Valley SSSI between Grampound and St Stephen is an ancient woodland dominated by sessile oak on the slopes, and of willow and alder carr on the floodplain which has a rich ground flora. The species list includes many ancient woodland indicators including lichens such as Parmelia endochlora.

The Upper Fal Estuary and Woods SSSI is mostly within the tidal area of the river between Tregony and Turnaware Point and includes mudflats, salt marsh and ancient woodland. The mudflats support nationally important numbers of black-tailed godwit as well as large populations of wintering waders and wildfowl such as curlew and golden plover. A series of transition zones occurs from the salt marsh to scrub, where young trees attempt to grow despite the threat of the highest tides, to ancient woodland on the higher slopes. These zones and the estuary itself are important for otters. The lowest part of the Fal along with the Helford River is designated as the Fal and Helford Special Area of Conservation under the Habitats Directive for the shallow bays and inlets, sandbanks and mudflats, and for its salt marshes. Part of the area is also designated as an Important Plant Area and a SSSI (Lower Fal & Helford Intertidal) for the relatively undisturbed transitions from tidal mud through saltmarsh and scrub to woodland.

Three institutional landowners that own land within Upper Fal Estuary and Woods SSSI include the Duchy of Cornwall, the National Trust (for example, the Trelissick estate) and the Diocese of Truro (via its Diocesan Board of Finance).

== Water quality ==
The Fal has been described as the most polluted river in England. In 2021, raw sewage was discharged straight into the river for over 7,500 hours as a consequence of the 100-year old sewage system being overwhelmed by heavy rain.

== Recreation ==
The River Fal is accessible for kayaking, sailing and other watersports.

=== Towns and villages on the Fal ===
- Falmouth
- Feock
- Flushing
- Grampound
- Mylor
- Old Kea
- Penryn
- St Clement
- St Just in Roseland
- Tregony
- Truro
