= Cowlands =

Hamlet in Cornwall, England

Coordinates: 50.2273°N 5.04518°W

Cowlands: Cornish: Kewnans
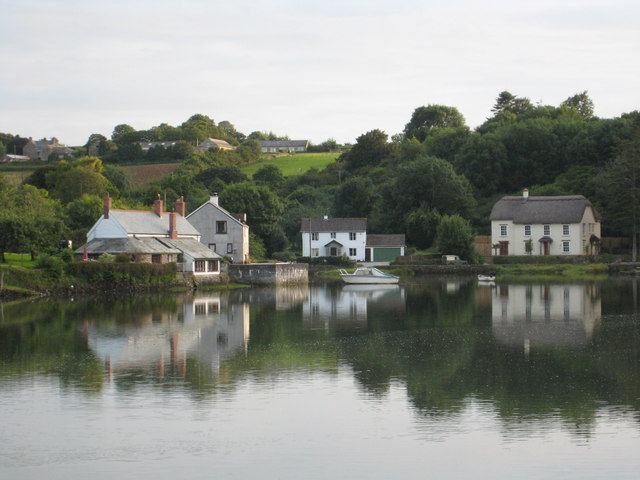

- Location within Cornwall
- OS grid reference: SW829408
- Unitary authority: Cornwall
- Ceremonial county: Cornwall
- Region: South West
- Country: England
- Sovereign state: United Kingdom
- Post town: Truro
- Postcode district: TR3
- Police: Devon and Cornwall
- Fire: Cornwall
- Ambulance: South Western

Cowlands (Cornish: Kewnans, meaning enclosed or steep sided valley) is a hamlet at the head of Coombe Creek southeast of Playing Place in Cornwall, England. According to the Post Office the population at the 2011 Census was included in the civil parish of Truro.
