= Restronguet Passage =

Hamlet in Cornwall, England

Coordinates: 50.19553°N 5.06538°W

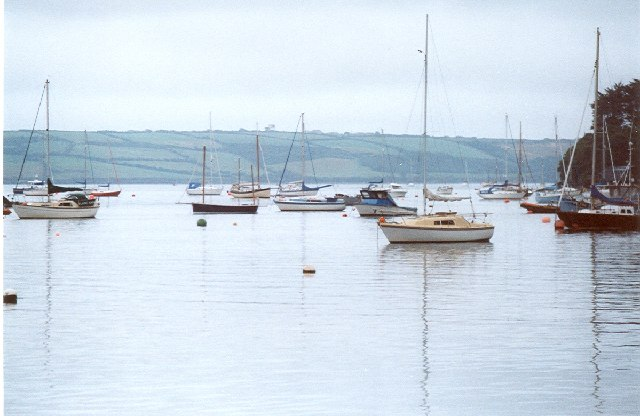
Looking east from Restronguet Passage

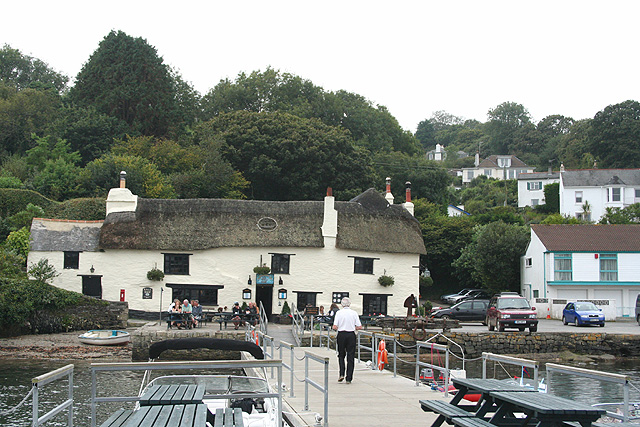
The Pandora Inn waterside pub at Restronguet Passage

Restronguet Passage is a coastal hamlet in Cornwall, England, United Kingdom. It is situated on the south bank of Restronguet Creek one mile north of Mylor Bridge and five miles (8 km) south of Truro.

Restronguet Passage is in Mylor civil parish and was the site of a ferry across Restronguet Creek to Restronguet Point. The creek is a popular location for yachting and dinghy racing and there are moorings for visiting boats at the Pandora Inn, a waterside public house.
