= Helston Water =

Hamlet in Cornwall, England

Coordinates: 50.232°N 5.109°W

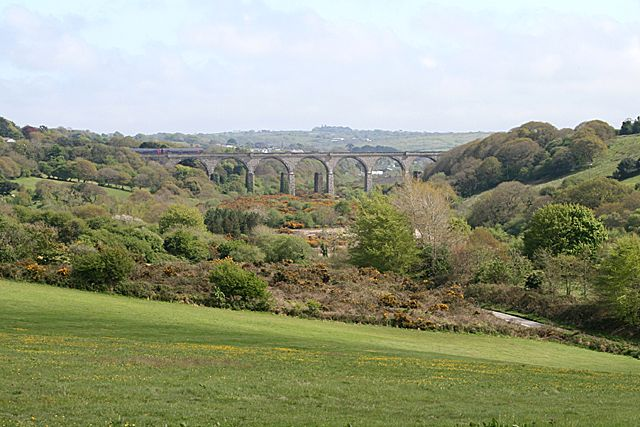
- Landscape near Helston Water

- Location within Cornwall
- OS grid reference: SW784415
- Civil parish: Kea
- Unitary authority: Cornwall
- Ceremonial county: Cornwall
- Region: South West
- Country: England
- Sovereign state: United Kingdom
- Post town: Truro
- Postcode district: TR4

Helston Water is a hamlet northwest of Carnon Downs in Cornwall, England. It is in the civil parish of Kea
