= Chycoose =

Coastal settlement in Cornwall, England

Coordinates: 50.20839°N 5.07214°W

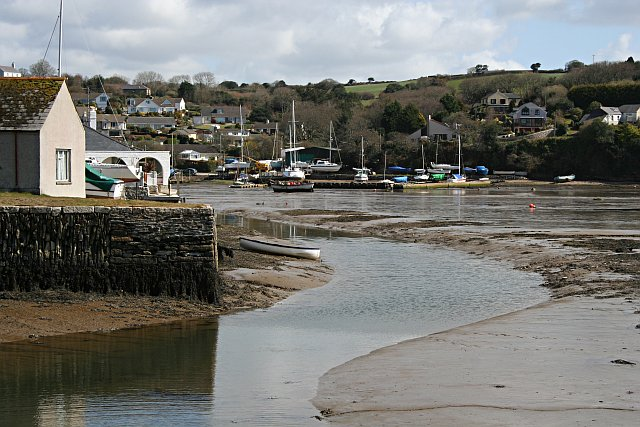
Penpol Creek, an inlet on the north bank of Restronguet Creek

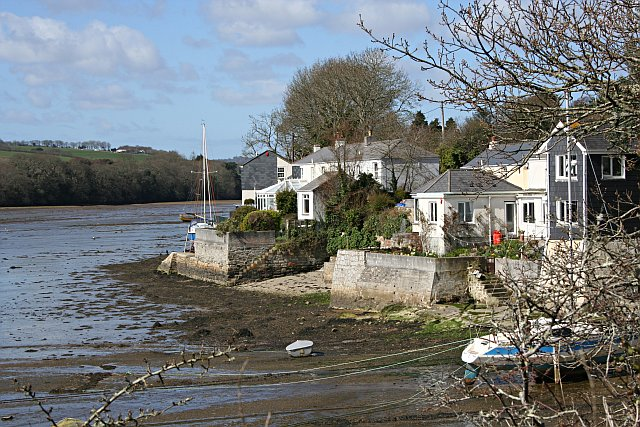
Houses on the shore at Point near Chycoose

Chycoose (Cornish: Chy'n Coos, meaning house of the wood), Point and Penpol (Cornish: Pen Pol, meaning head of a creek) form a coastal settlement around Penpol Creek in Cornwall, England, United Kingdom.

The creek is a ria, a tidal inlet on the north side of Restronguet Creek. It is situated approximately three-quarters of a mile (1 km) west of Feock village which is four miles (6.5 km) south of Truro.

Chycoose is on the west bank of Penpol Creek and Penpol hamlet is at the north end of the creek. Point is on a small promontory where Penpol Creek joins Restronguet Creek.

Trolver, a small coastal settlement, extends along the east side of the Penpol Creek south from Penpol.

Today, all four settlements are residential in character with many of the houses having river frontages and all four are in the civil parish of Feock.

However, until the beginning of the 20th century, Restronguet Creek was a busy commercial waterway with extensive wharves on the north bank. Penpol was a small port engaged in the export of tin and copper from the mining areas a few miles to the north and there were wharves at Point Quay served by an extension of the Redruth and Chasewater Railway; trains on this section of line were hauled by horses from Devoran, a mile (1.6 km) upstream.

Restronguet Creek and Carrick Roads (the tidal estuary of the River Fal) are a popular centre for yachting and dinghy racing and the quay at Penpol is now used for leisure boating.

'The Restronguet Creek Society' is a voluntary organisation formed in 1972 to protect and preserve the creek and its environs.
