= King Harry Ferry =

Chain ferry in Cornwall, England

Coordinates: 50°12′59.89″N 05°01′39.67″W

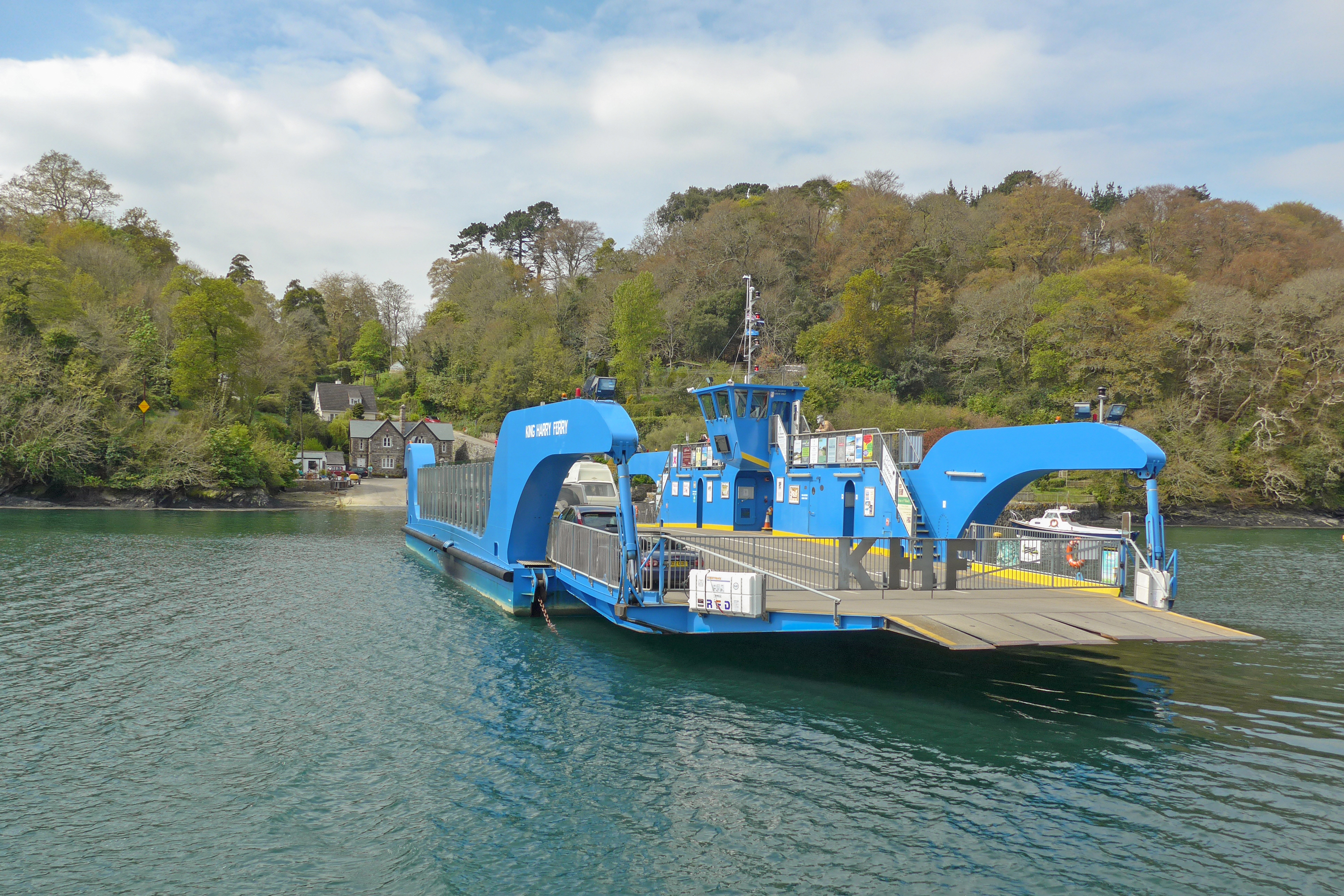
The current King Harry Ferry (No. 7) in 2017

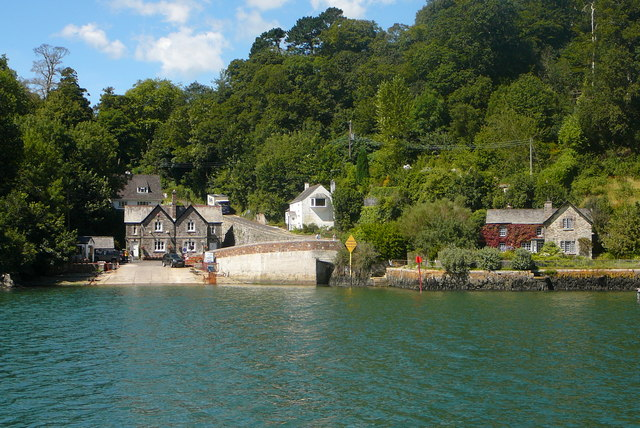
The Feock terminal of the King Harry Ferry in 2007

The King Harry Ferry Bridge is a vehicular chain ferry which crosses the Carrick Roads reach of the estuary of the River Fal in Cornwall, England, UK. The ferry crosses between the parishes of Feock and Philleigh, roughly halfway between the city of Truro, the lowest bridging point on the estuary, and the town of Falmouth, at the estuary's mouth. The ferry is owned and operated by the King Harry Steam Ferry Company Ltd. The current ferry boat, named No. 7, was built in 2006 and can carry up to 34 cars.

== History ==
It is likely that there has been a ferry of some description at the King Harry Passage for centuries, but there are conflicting stories about the origins of the name. One such story is that King Henry VIII spent his honeymoon with Anne Boleyn at St Mawes, and signed a charter for the ferry on this site. A more likely origin lies in the fact that a small chapel formerly stood on the Philleigh side of the passage. All that remains of this today is a small pile of stones, but is mentioned in 1528 as "The Chapel of St. Mary and King Henry", commemorating King Henry VI, murdered in 1471.

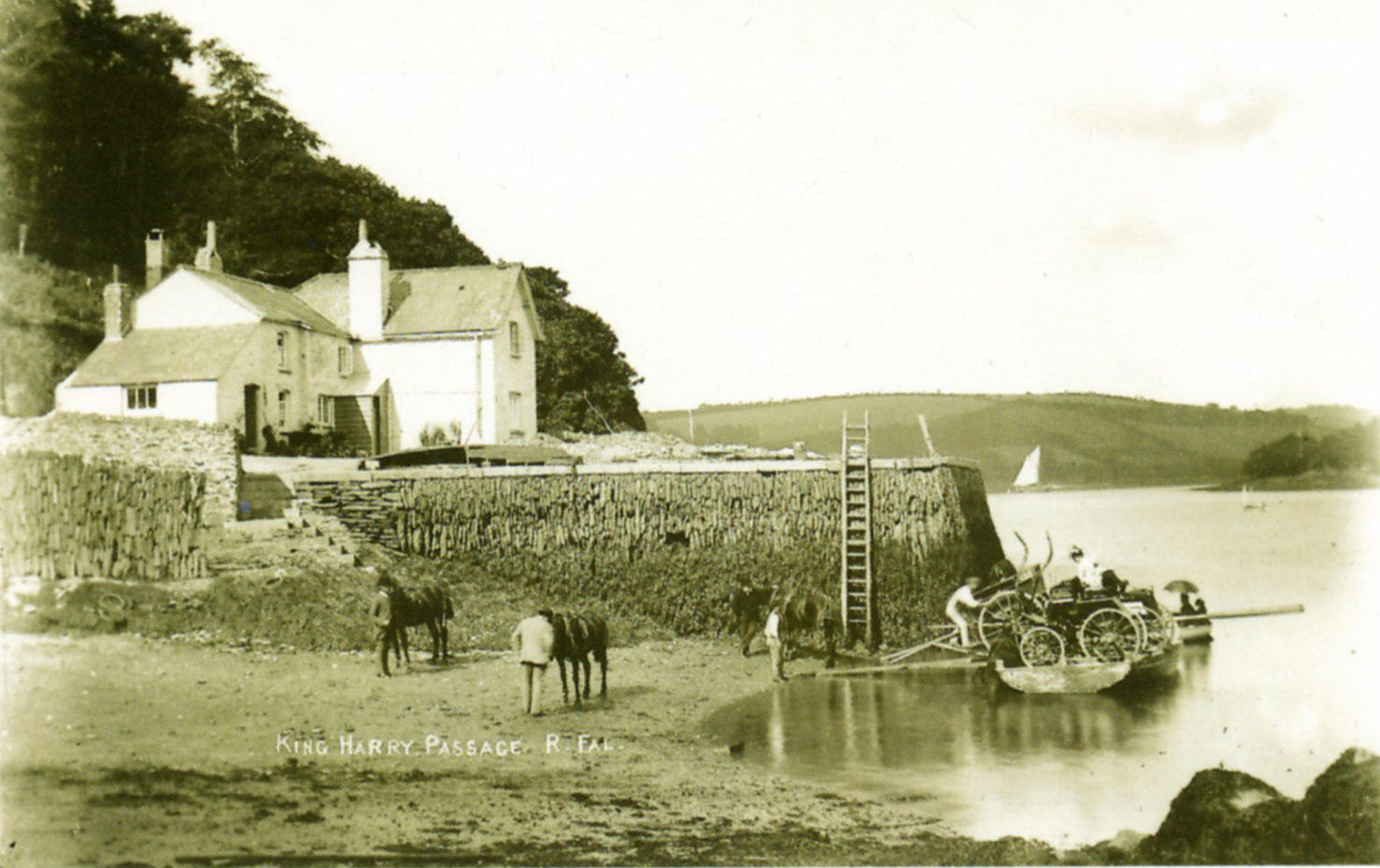
King Harry vehicle ferry operated by rowing boats.

In the 19th century, the ferry was operated by broad beamed rowing boats which had planks laid sideways across them to take two or three wheeled vehicles.

The King Harry Steam Ferry was initiated in 1888 as a submerged chain ferry Bridge, using a steam engine to pull the ferry along the chains, and replacing a manually propelled barge that was previously used on the route. As its name suggests, the current ferry bridge is the seventh vessel to be used since 1888. Although the owning company has retained the words Steam Ferry in its name, all ferries since 1956 have used diesel-electric propulsion. The company is now owned by a syndicate of five local families.

== Description ==
The crossing of the River Fal has been voted one of the ten most scenic ferry trips in the world by The Independent, alongside the Staten Island Ferry in New York and the Star Ferry in Hong Kong. The Feock terminal of the ferry is adjacent to the renowned Trelissick house and garden.

A toll is charged for vehicular use of the ferry; a charitable donation is invited from pedestrians. Local people purchase concession tickets to keep the price low. If the ferry is not operating, the alternative is a 26-mile (42 km) detour via the city of Truro.
