= Feock, Cornwall =

Village in Cornwall, England

Coordinates: 50.206°N 5.050°W

Feock: Cornish: Lannfyek
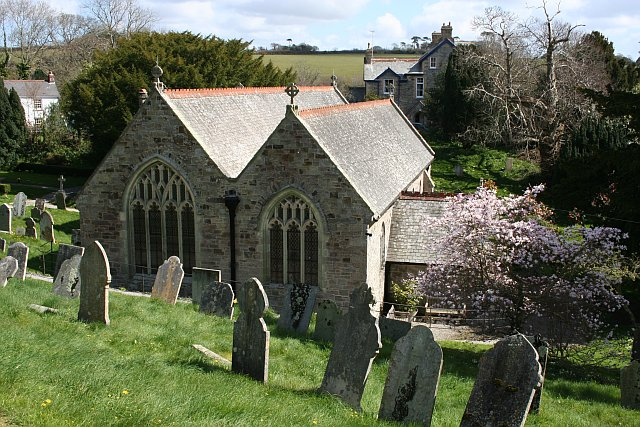
- Feock Church

- Location within Cornwall
- Population: 3,708 (Civil Parish, 2011 including Bissom)
- OS grid reference: SW824384
- Civil parish: Feock
- Unitary authority: Cornwall
- Ceremonial county: Cornwall
- Region: South West
- Country: England
- Sovereign state: United Kingdom
- Post town: TRURO
- Postcode district: TR3
- Dialling code: 01872
- Police: Devon and Cornwall
- Fire: Cornwall
- Ambulance: South Western
- UK Parliament: Truro and Falmouth

Feock (/ˈfiːɒk/ FEE-ock; Cornish: Lannfyek) is a coastal civil parish and village in Cornwall, England, United Kingdom. It is about 5 miles (8.0 km) south of Truro at the head of Carrick Roads on the River Fal. To the south, the parish is bordered by Restronguet Creek and to the east by Carrick Roads and the River Fal. To the north, it is bordered by Kea parish and to the west by Perranarworthal parish.

Feock parish includes the villages of Carnon Downs, Chycoose, Devoran, Goon Piper, Harcourt, Killiganoon, Penelewey, Penpol, Porthgwidden, Restronguet Point, Trevilla, and Trelissick. The electoral ward is called Feock and Kea. At the 2011 census it had a population of 4,511 whereas the civil parish including Bissom has a population of 3,708 only.

The garden of the Trelissick Estate is a National Trust property. The King Harry Ferry takes cars across the Fal to Philleigh and the Roseland Peninsula.

Feock lies within the Cornwall Area of Outstanding Natural Beauty (AONB). Almost a third of Cornwall has AONB designation.

The Duchy Grammar School was built as a house named Tregye in 1809 for William Penrose; in the late 19th century it was extended and remodeled. A 20th-century extension obscures the original entrance.

== Parish church ==
The Parish Church is dedicated to Saint Feoca, about whom very little is known. Although the saint is usually assumed to have been female, Hals described a stained glass window in the church with St Feock portrayed as a man. The church has a 13th-century tower and font, the remainder being 19th-century. As late as 1640, according to Hals, the sacrament was administered by the Reverend William Jackson in Cornish as the people understood no other language. Feock feast was observed on 2 February.

There are two Cornish crosses in the parish: one is in the churchyard and the other at Trelissick. The cross in the churchyard probably dates from the 13th century (it has a crude crucifixus figure on one side of the head and a foliated cross on the other). The cross at Trelissick was moved from Tredrea in the parish of St Erth in the 1840s; it has a crude crucifixus figure on the front of the head but the back is defaced. It had been found in a field called "Parc an Grouse".

Thomas Lobb, Victorian botanist and plant hunter is buried in Devoran churchyard. Trelissick Garden has been in the ownership of the National Trust since 1955 when it was donated by Ida Copeland following the death of her son Geoffrey; Mrs. Copeland donated a stained glass memorial window (bearing the Copeland coat of arms) to the parish church of Feock.

== Cornish wrestling ==
Cornish wrestling tournaments, for prizes were held at Feock Downs in the 1800s.

== Twinning ==
Feock is twinned with:

- Hôpital-Camfrout (An Ospital) a Breton village in Finistère, Brittany, France.

== Gallery ==
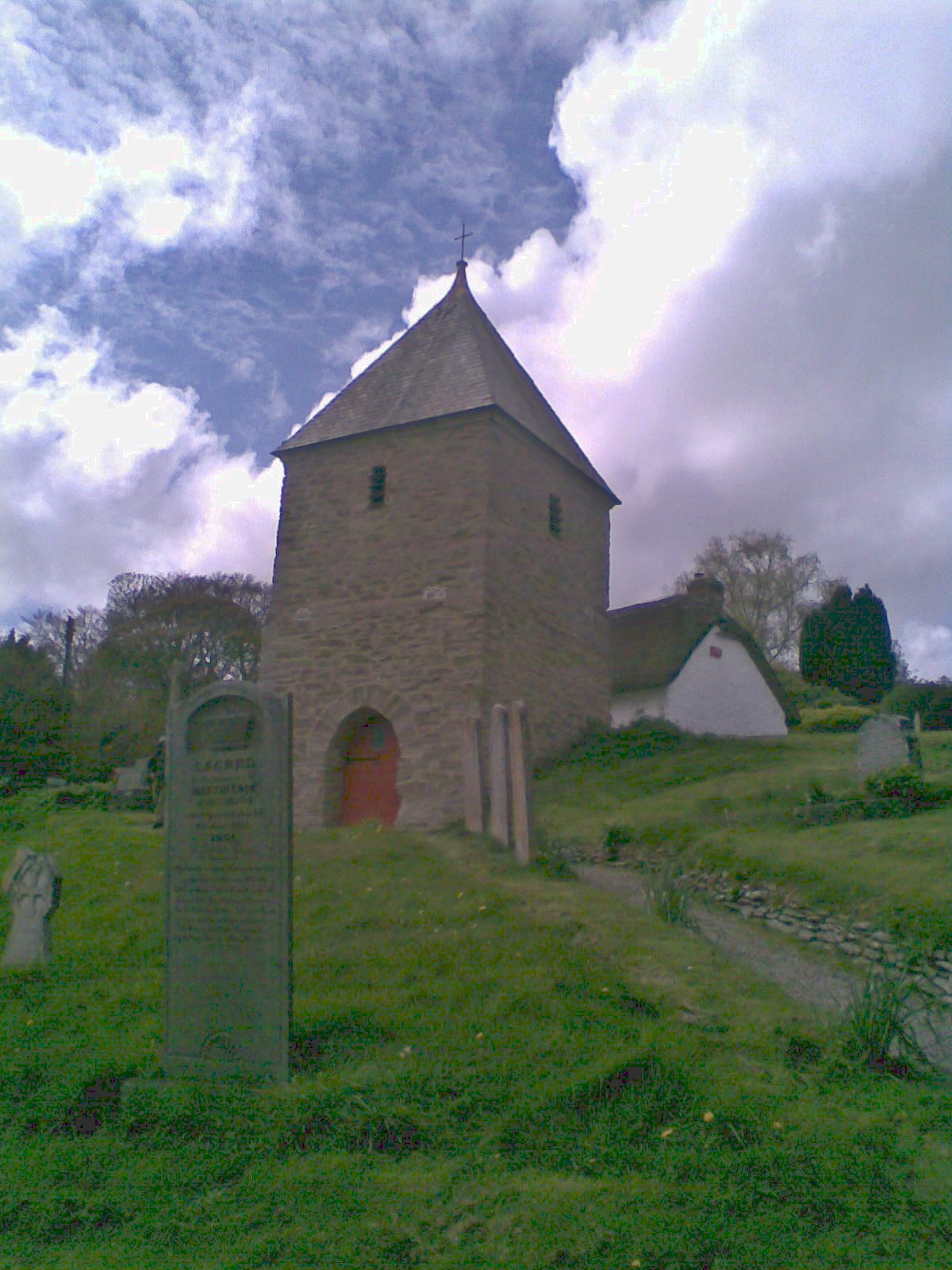
Separate Bell-tower at Feock Church

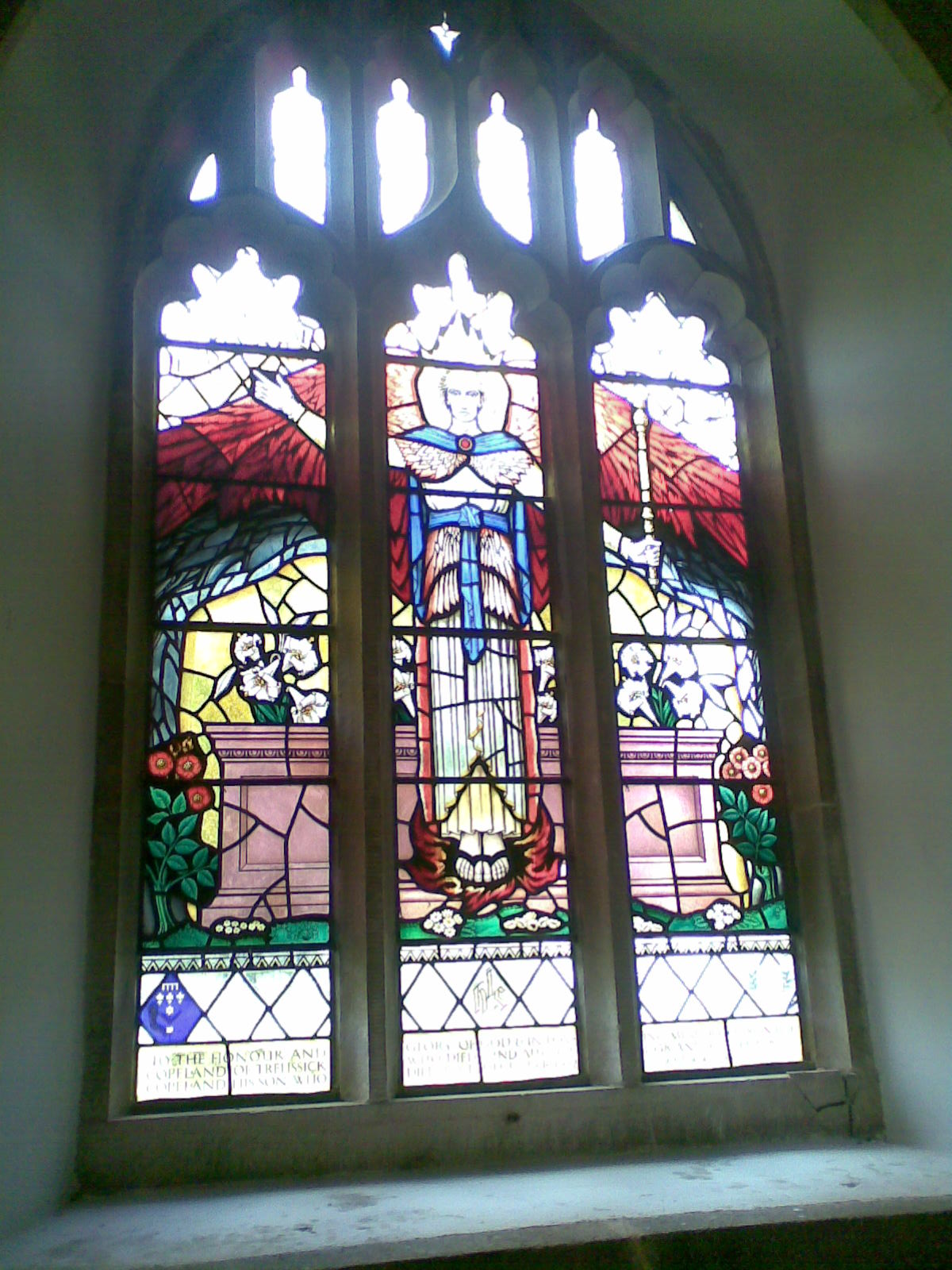
Window representing the Resurrection, at Feock Church

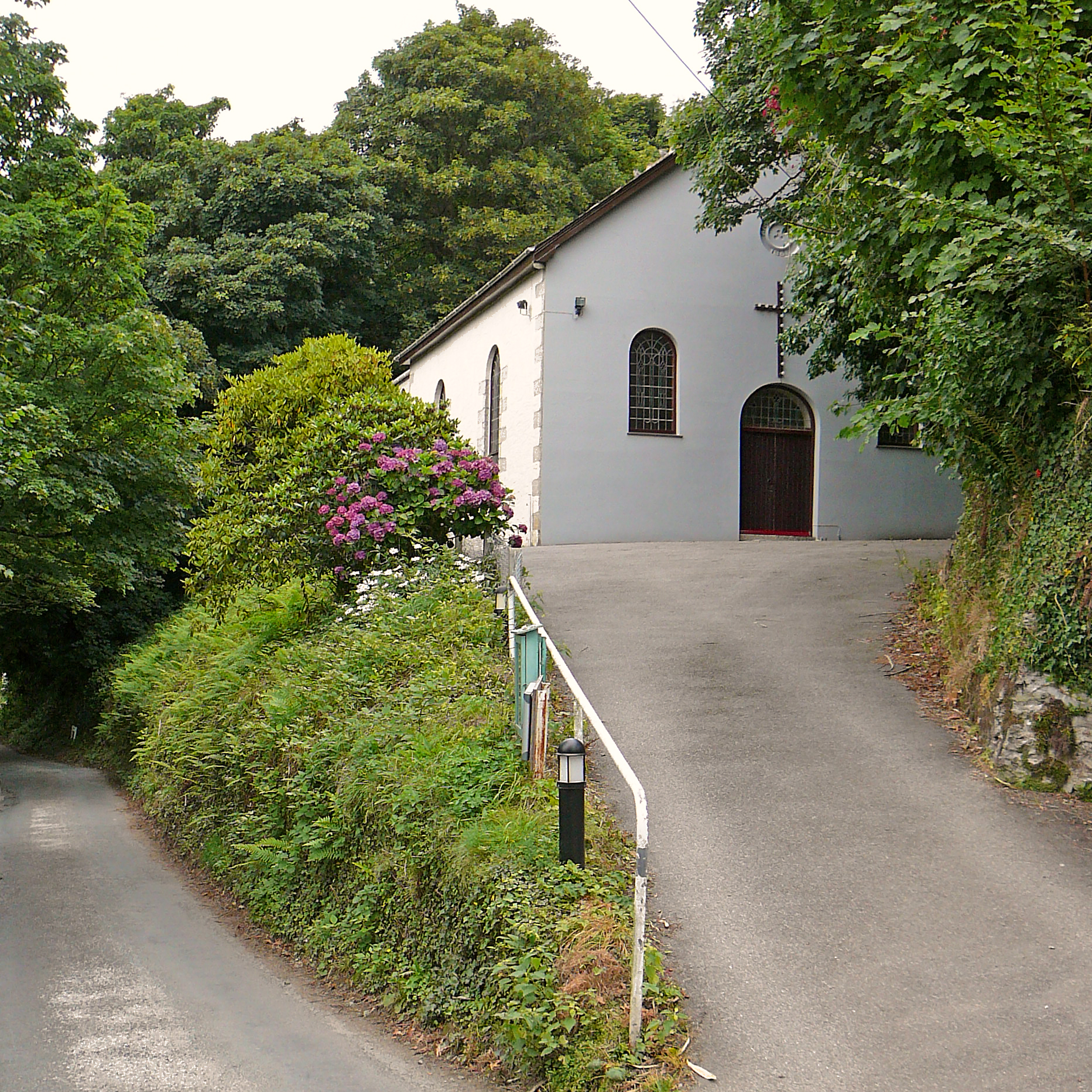
Penpol Methodist Chapel

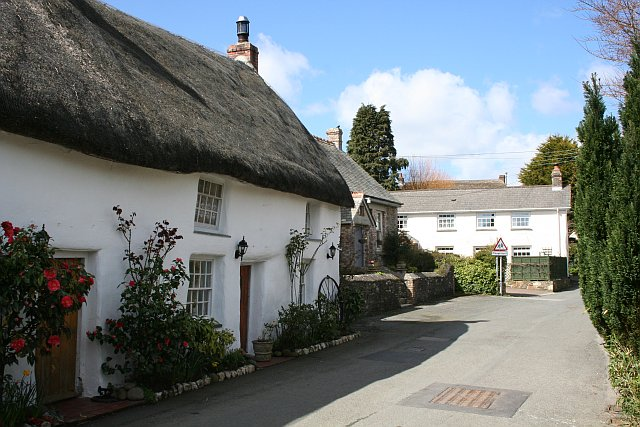
The Old Post Office, Feock
