= Devoran =

Village in south Cornwall, England

Coordinates: 50.21144°N 5.09270°W

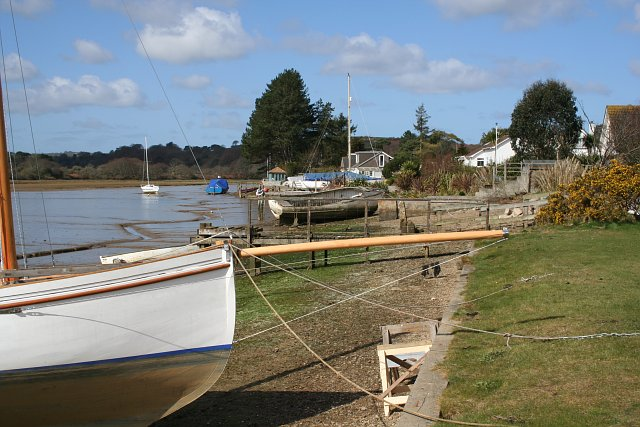
The quay at Devoran, once a busy mining port

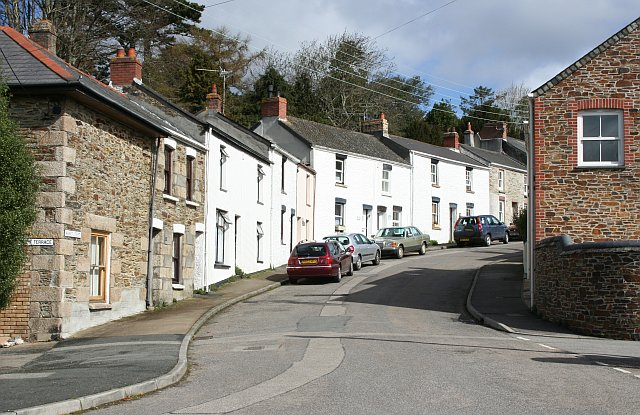
Market Street, Devoran

Devoran (Cornish: Deveryon) is a village in south Cornwall, England, United Kingdom. It is 4 miles (6.4 km) southwest of Truro at grid reference SW 793 392. Formerly an ecclesiastical parish, Devoran is now in the civil parish of Feock (where the 2011 census population is included).

The village is on the northeast bank of the Carnon River at its confluence with Restronguet Creek, a tidal creek which flows into Carrick Roads above Falmouth. Devoran is at the Normal Tidal Limit (NTL) of the creek but until the 20th century the tidal limit stretched much further up the valley than now.

The name Devoran comes from the Cornish language Deveryon, meaning 'waters'.

== Mining ==
Devoran played an important role in the tin and copper mining industry. It developed as a small port engaged in the export of mined minerals and the import of mining materials and coal. The Redruth and Chasewater Railway, an early industrial line which served the many mines a few miles to the north, terminated at the port (although there was an extension to wharves at Point on which trains were hauled by horses rather than locomotives). Today, this long-disused railway forms part of a coast-to-coast footpath and cycle route.

A ruined engine house of Carnon Mine is on the bank of the estuary near Devoran. The tin mine was in operation from 1824 to 1830.

== Church ==
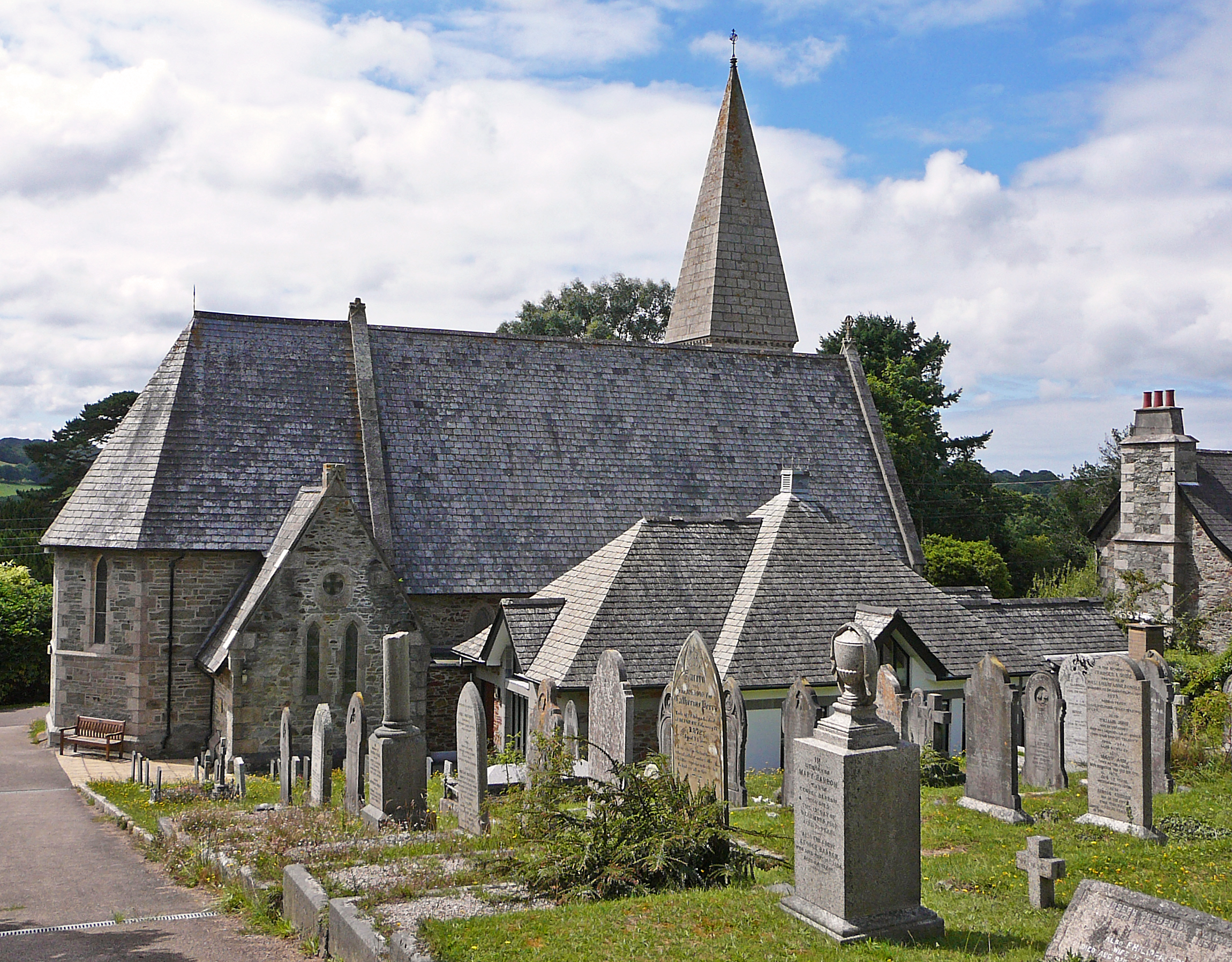
The church of St John and St Petroc

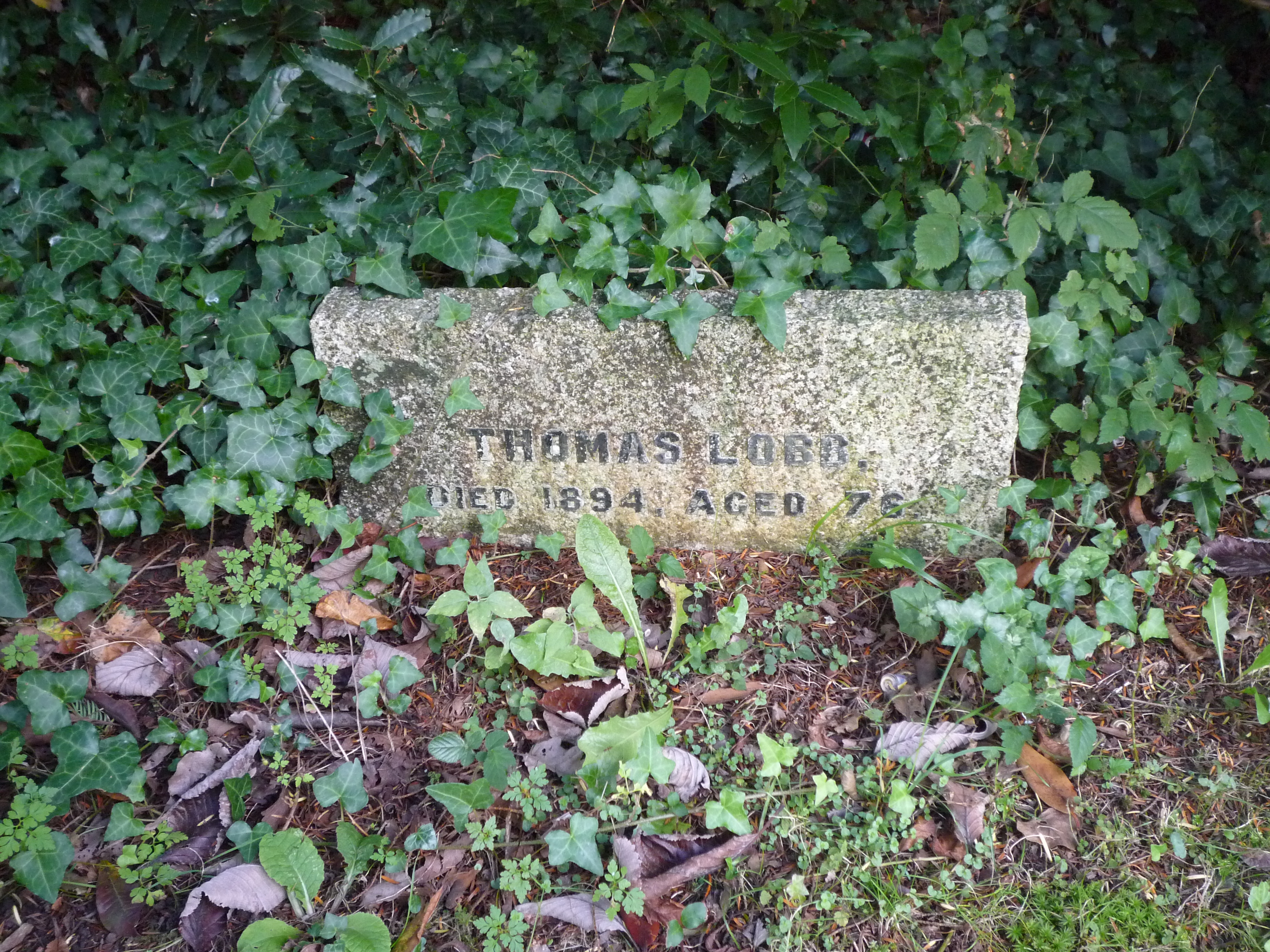
Thomas Lobb's headstone, Devoran church

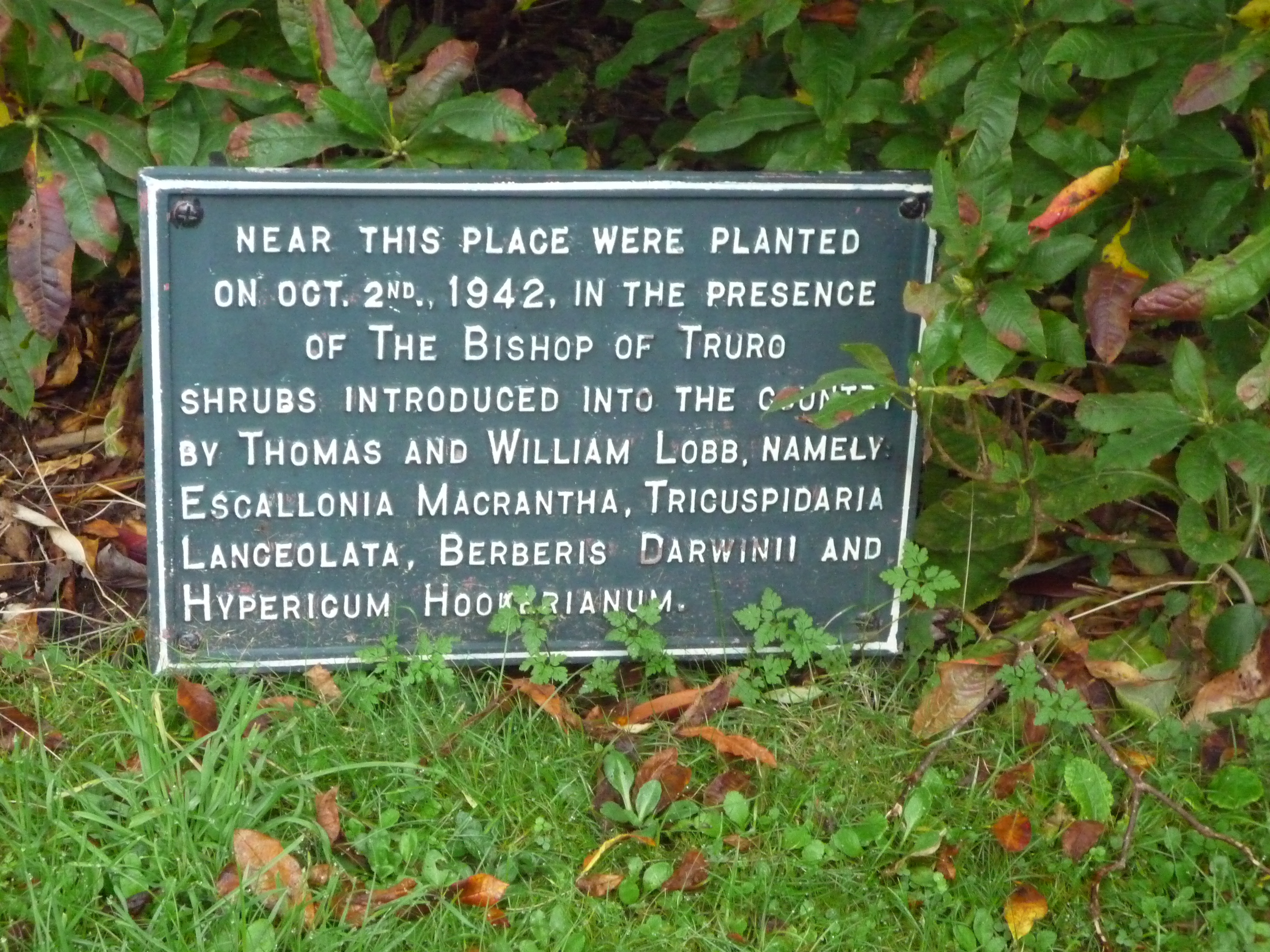
Thomas and William Lobb's memorial garden planting near his headstone, Devoran church

The church of St John the Evangelist and St Petroc (architect John Loughborough Pearson) was built in 1855–56 and consists of a nave and chancel only. Until 1873 Devoran was in the parish of Feock which was then divided to make a new parish. The parish church was renovated in 1879. Devoran is now one of the Waterside Churches.

Thomas Lobb, Victorian botanist and plant hunter is buried in Devoran churchyard. The parish war memorial by H. J. Martin lists seventeen names "in grateful memory of the men of the parish of Devoran who fell in the Great War 1914–1919". A further section of eight names was added of Second World War casualties.
