= Cléder =

Cléder Kleder
- Commune
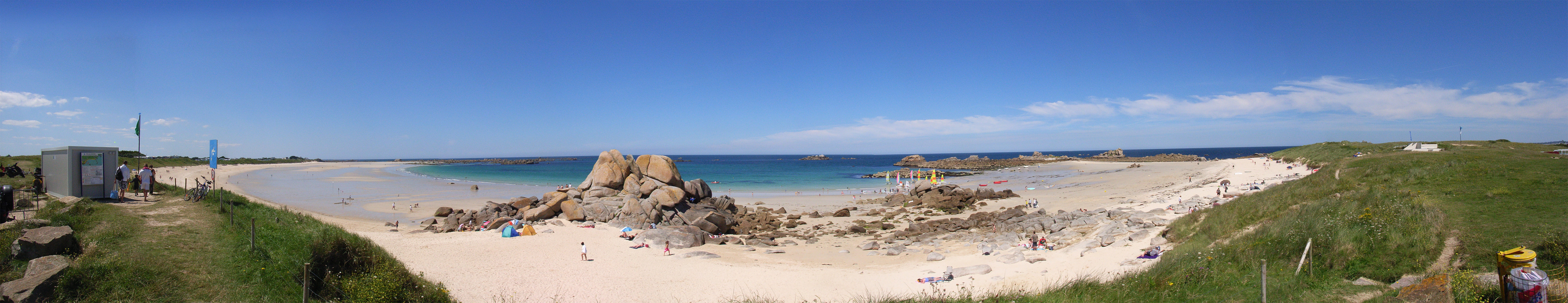
- Les Amiets beach

- Coat of arms
- Location of Cléder
- Location within France Location within Brittany
- Coordinates: 48°39′51″N 4°06′03″W
- Country: France
- Region: Brittany
- Department: Finistère
- Arrondissement: Morlaix
- Canton: Saint-Pol-de-Léon

Government
  - Mayor (2023–2026): Jean-Noël Edern
- Area^{1}: 37.44 km^{2} (14.46 sq mi)
- Highest elevation: 79 m (259 ft)
- Lowest elevation: 0 m (0 ft)
- Population (2023): 3,584
  - Density: 95.73/km^{2} (247.9/sq mi)
- Time zone: UTC+01:00 (CET)
  - Summer (DST): UTC+02:00 (CEST)
- INSEE/Postal code: 29030 /29233
- ^{1} French Land Register data, which excludes lakes, ponds, glaciers > 1 km^{2} (0.386 sq mi or 247 acres) and river estuaries.

Cléder (French pronunciation: [kledɛʁ]; Breton: Kleder) is a commune in the Finistère department of Brittany in north-western France.

== Population ==
Inhabitants of Cléder are called in French Clédérois.

Historical population
Year	Pop.	±% p.a.
1968	4,275	—
1975	3,923	−1.22%
1982	3,928	+0.02%
1990	3,801	−0.41%
1999	3,641	−0.48%
2007	3,807	+0.56%
2012	3,866	+0.31%
2017	3,779	−0.45%
2023	3,584	−0.88%
Source: INSEE

== Breton language ==
In 2008, 25.9% of primary-school children attended bilingual schools.

== International relations ==
Cléder is twinned with Ashburton (United Kingdom) , Herleshausen (Germany) and Taninges (France) .

== See also ==
- Communes of the Finistère department
