= Restronguet Creek =

Tidal ria in south Cornwall, England

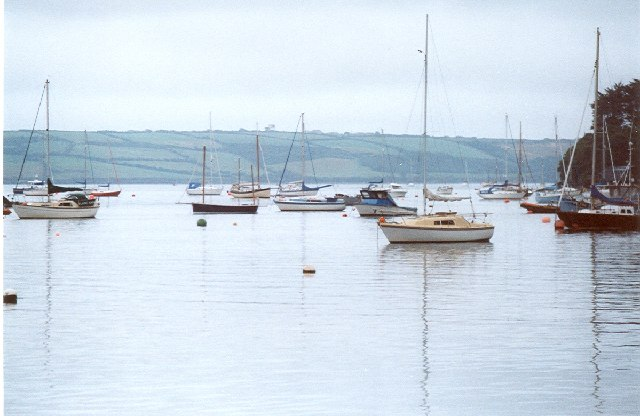
Sailing boats moored in Restronguet Creek

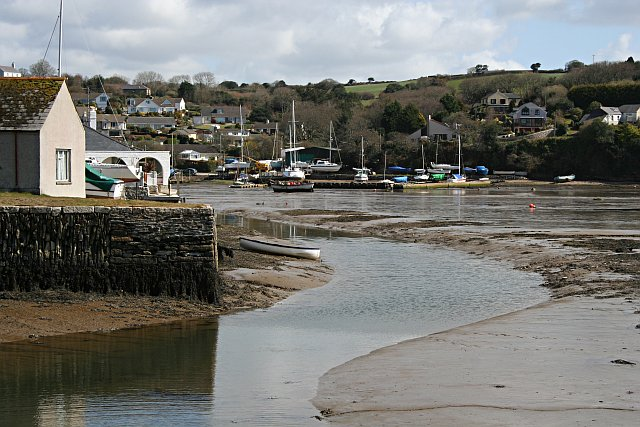
Penpol Creek, an inlet on the north bank of Restronguet Creek

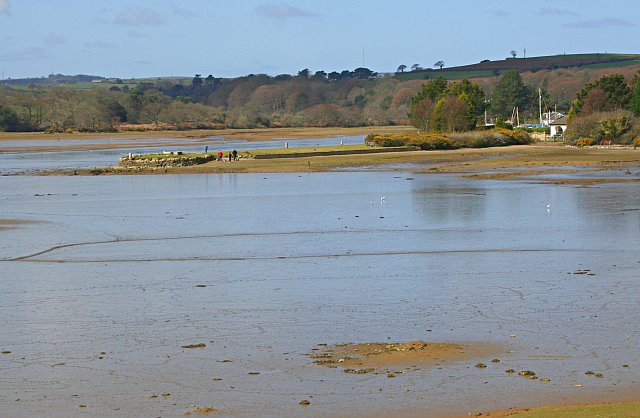
Restronguet Creek east of Devoran

Restronguet Creek is a tidal ria in south Cornwall, United Kingdom. It is a tributary of Carrick Roads, the estuary of the River Fal, and is situated approximately four miles (6.5 km) south of Truro and three miles (5 km) north of Falmouth.

The creek is approximately two miles (3 km) long from its Normal Tidal Limit (NTL) to its mouth and half-a-mile (800 metres) across at its widest point. It discharges into Carrick Roads at Restronguet Point through a narrow channel known locally as 'the gut'.

Restronguet Creek forms the boundary between the civil parishes of Feock (on the north bank), Mylor (at the eastern end of the south bank), and Perranarworthal (at the western end of the south bank).

At its upstream end, Restronguet Creek is fed by two freshwater rivers: the Carnon River from the northwest and the River Kennall from the southwest. The NTL on the Carnon River is immediately upstream of Devoran where the A39 trunk road crosses the river; the NTL on the River Kennall is at Perran Wharf. A smaller stream from the north discharges into the tidal creek at Penpol.

== Industrial past ==
Until the beginning of the 20th century, Restronguet Creek (and its tributary rivers) played an important role in the tin and copper mining industry. Devoran was a small port engaged in the export of mined minerals and the import of mining materials and coal.

The Redruth and Chasewater Railway, an early industrial line which served the many mines a few miles to the north, terminated at Devoran (although there was an extension to Point Quay on Restronguet Creek; trains were hauled by horses rather than locomotives on the extension). There were also wharves and quays at the head of Penpol Creek.

At low water, large expanses of intertidal mudflats are exposed (which can be dangerous because the mud is deep and very soft) and recent academic study suggests the mud still bears evidence of mineral contamination by former mining activity further upstream.

== Leisure ==
Today, Restronguet Creek, Carrick Roads and Cornwall's English Channel coast are popular for yachting and dinghy racing. Restronguet Sailing Club takes its name from the creek although it is located a mile south at Mylor Harbour.

'The Restronguet Creek Society' is a voluntary organisation formed in 1972 to protect and preserve the creek and its environs. The organisation opposes unsuitable development and, in particular, any construction or activity that would cause further silting.

== Locations ==
- Normal Tidal Limit (NTL) at Devoran coordinates 50.21292°N 5.09881°W grid reference SW 789 393
- Penpol Creek (north bank) coordinates 50.206742°N 5.06676°W grid reference SW 812 387
- Restrongruet Passage (south bank) coordinates 50.19553°N 5.06538°W grid reference SW 811 375
- Mouth (Restronguet Point) coordinates 50.19212°N 5.05637°W grid reference SW 821 366
