= Goon Piper =

Coordinates: 50.215°N 5.058°W

- Location within Cornwall
- OS grid reference: SW819395
- Civil parish: Feock
- Unitary authority: Cornwall
- Ceremonial county: Cornwall
- Region: South West
- Country: England
- Sovereign state: United Kingdom
- Post town: Truro
- Postcode district: TR3

Goon Piper (Goonpiper on Ordnance Survey maps) is a hamlet in the parish of Feock, Cornwall, England.
