= Old Kea =

Hamlet in Cornwall, England

Coordinates: 50.237°N 5.025°W

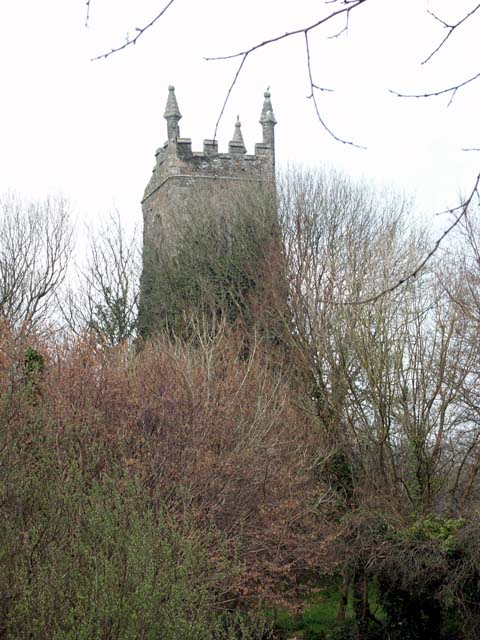
The tower of Old Kea church

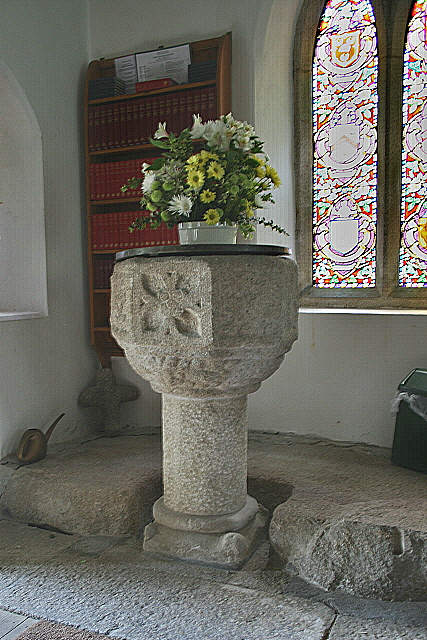
The church font

Old Kea (Cornish: Lanndege) is a hamlet in Cornwall, England, United Kingdom. It is situated on the west bank of the Truro River approximately two miles (3 km) south of Truro.

This and the nearby village of Kea are said to have been named after the Saint Kea who arrived at Old Kea from Ireland in the 5th century.

The manor of "Landighe" (Landege) is recorded in the Domesday Book (1086) when it was held by Godwin from Robert, Count of Mortain. There was one hide of land and land for 5 ploughs. There were one and half ploughs, 3 serfs, 2 villeins, 4 smallholders, 2 acres of meadow, 3 acres of woodland, one square league of pasture, 2 cattle, 40 sheep and 15 goats. The value of the manor was 10 shillings though it had formerly been worth £1-10s.

Only the tower remains of the original parish church which stood at Old Kea. A small mission chapel was built onto the church in 1863 and services are still held twice a month.

Old Kea lies within the Cornwall Area of Outstanding Natural Beauty (AONB).
