= Penelewey =

Hamlet in Cornwall, England

Coordinates: 50.223°N 5.062°W

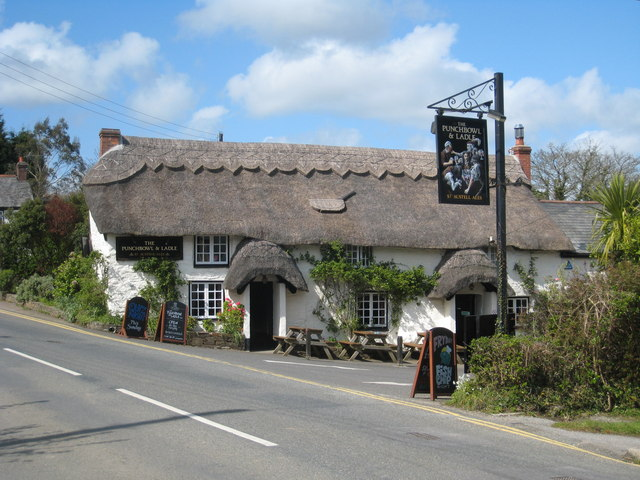
The Punchbowl and Ladle Inn, Penelewey

Penelewey is a hamlet southeast of Playing Place in Cornwall, England, UK. Penelewey is on the B3289 road.
