= Restronguet Point =

Headland in Cornwall, England

Coordinates: 50.19212°N 5.05637°W

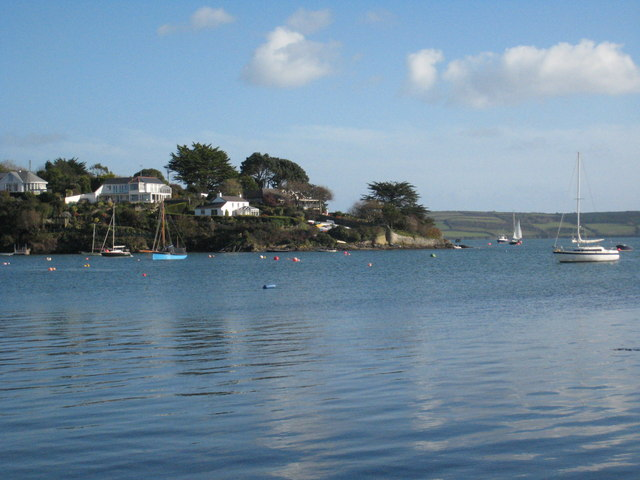
Restronguet Point seen from the south bank of Restronguet Creek

Restronguet Point (Cornish: Ros Trongoos, meaning promontory of a wooded point) is a small narrow promontory in the civil parish of Feock in south Cornwall, England, United Kingdom. It is situated approximately three-quarters of a mile (1 km) south of Feock village.

Together with Harcourt (Cornish: Ar Carrek, meaning facing a rock) and Porthgwidden (neighbouring settlements immediately north of the promontory), Restronguet Point forms a distinct community recognised by Feock Parish Council and supported by its own community group, 'Friends of Restronguet Point'. The group has an input into local planning decisions. Restronguet Point is a residential area with housing (mostly large detached properties) on both sides of the lane from Feock.

The promontory is approximately 200 metres (660 ft) wide and 700 metres (2,300 ft) long. It projects southward between Restronguet Creek (to the west) and Carrick Roads (to the east). At the southern tip of the promontory (grid reference SW 821 366), the creek discharges into Carrick Roads through a narrow channel known locally as 'the gut'.

Restronguet Point lies within the Cornwall Area of Outstanding Natural Beauty (AONB).
