= Playing Place =

Village in Cornwall, England

Coordinates: 50.232°N 5.071°W

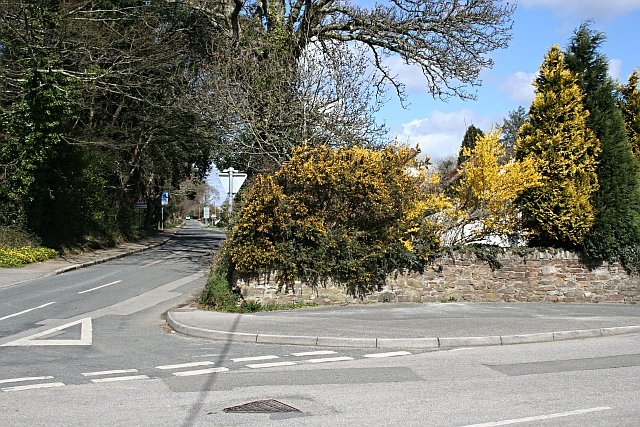

- Location within Cornwall
- OS grid reference: SW811414
- Unitary authority: Cornwall
- Ceremonial county: Cornwall
- Region: South West
- Country: England
- Sovereign state: United Kingdom
- Post town: TRURO
- Postcode district: TR3
- Dialling code: 01872

Playing Place is a village southwest of Truro, Cornwall, England. It is to the east of the A39 road. The name derives from Cornish 'plain an gwarry' (meaning "playing place"), an open-air performance area used historically for entertainment and instruction.

== History ==
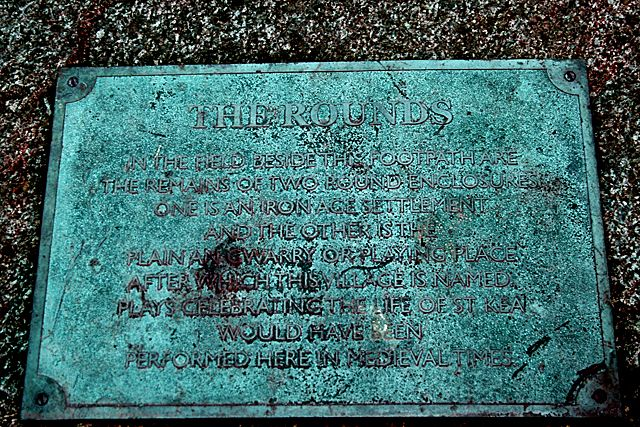
Plaque at Playing Place

The village is located in the parish of Kea, and nearby Old Kea is where St Kea landed in Cornwall on the banks of the River Truro. Plays featuring St Kea were particularly performed here amongst other ordinalia according to a plaque in the village. Bewnans Ke (The Life of Saint Ke) is a Middle Cornish play on the life of the saint, rediscovered in 2000. In more recent times the play facilities of the village's skatepark have also gained renown. Built in 1977, it is one of the few remaining examples of skateparks built at that period. It has a bowl with gentle transitions with a tighter speed bowl at one end. In the 1980s, a concrete extension was added providing an additional quarter pipe. It has been saved from destruction owing to the roots of some nearby protected trees which have spread underneath it. However, it is not always kept clean.
