= Carnon Downs =

Village in Cornwall, England

Coordinates: 50.22238°N 5.08755°W

Carnon Downs: Cornish: Goon Karnen
- Location within Cornwall
- Population: 1,363
- OS grid reference: SW800404
- Shire county: Cornwall
- Region: South West
- Country: England
- Sovereign state: United Kingdom
- Post town: Truro
- Postcode district: TR3
- Dialling code: 01872
- Police: Devon and Cornwall
- Fire: Cornwall
- Ambulance: South Western

Carnon Downs (Cornish: Goon Karnen) is a village in Cornwall, England, United Kingdom. It is about three miles southwest of Truro on the A39 Truro to Falmouth road.

Carnon Downs is in the civil parish of Feock (the population at the 2011 census included here), and consists mostly of bungalows, and detached housing built in the latter half of the 20th century.

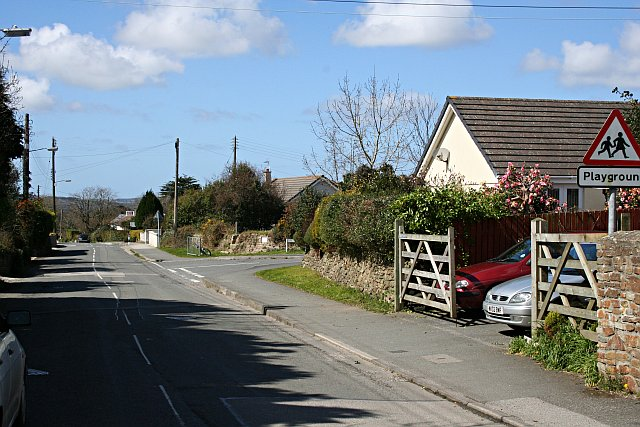
Bissoe Road, Carnon Downs

== Cornish wrestling ==
A Cornish wrestling tournament was held at Algarnick Farm in Carnon Downs in 1983.
