= Trelissick =

Manor house in Cornwall, England

- Trelesik (Cornish)
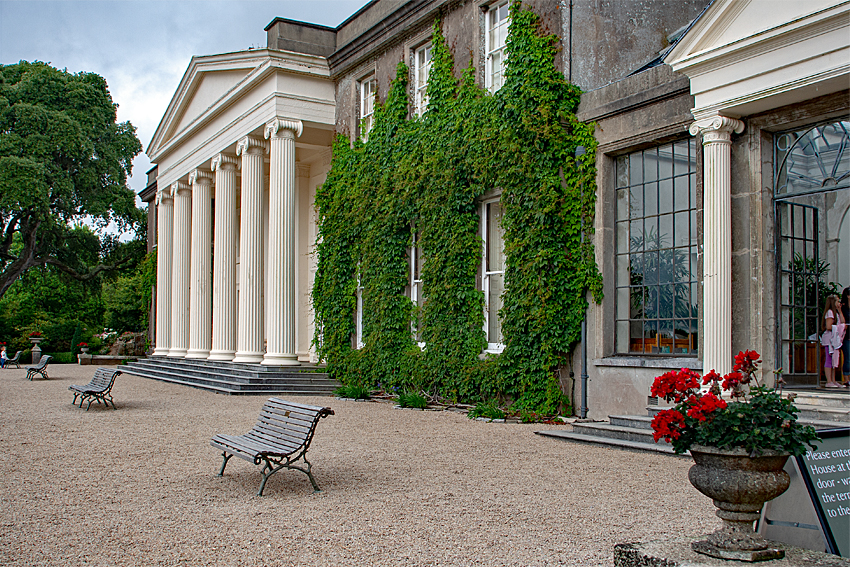
- View of the south front

- Location within Cornwall
- 50.216973°N 5.033530°W
- Location: Feock, Cornwall, England

Site notes
- Owner: National Trust

Listed Building – Grade II*
- Official name: Trelissick House and walls surrounding
- Designated: 28 February 1952
- Reference no.: 1159398

National Register of Historic Parks and Gardens
- Official name: Trelissick
- Designated: 11 June 1987
- Reference no.: 1000656

Trelissick (Cornish: Trelesik) is a house and garden in the ownership of the National Trust at Feock, near Truro, Cornwall, England. It is located on the B3289 road, just west of King Harry Ferry, and overlooks the estuary known as Carrick Roads. It lies within the Cornwall National Landscape. Almost a third of Cornwall has National Landscape designation.

in 2025, it received 217,048 visitors annually.

== History ==
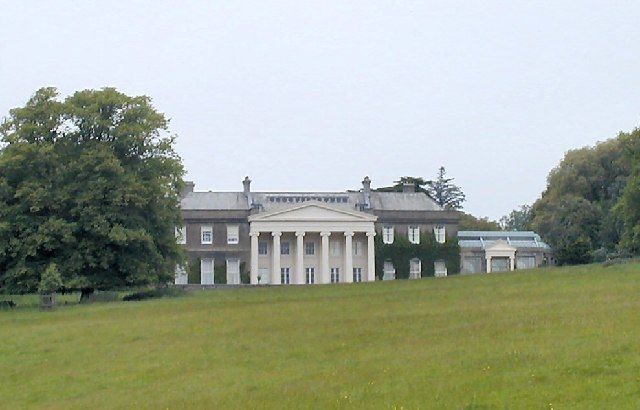
The house

Trelissick, first recorded in 1275, means "Leidic's farm". Trelissick in the parish of St Ewe has the same derivation but Trelissick in St Erth and Trelissick in Sithney have a different one ("Gwledic's farm").

The house was designed around 1750 by the paternal grandfather of Humphry Davy for John Lawrence and remodelled in the 1820s by Thomas Daniell. It was further extended in the late 19th century. It is Grade II* listed.

The estate has been in the ownership of the National Trust since 1955 when it was donated by Ida Copeland following the death of her son Geoffrey, on the understanding that the family could continue to reside there. A stained glass memorial bearing the Copeland coat of arms was donated to Feock parish church by Mrs. Copeland. The house and garden had formerly been owned and developed by the Daniell family, which had made its fortune in the 18th century Cornish copper mining industry.

The contents of the house were sold in July 2013 by Bonhams auctioneers.

== Cornish wrestling ==
Cornish wrestling tournaments, for prizes, were held in Trelissick in the 1900s.

== Garden ==
Many of the species that flourish in the mild Cornish air, including the rhododendrons and azaleas which are now such a feature of the garden, were planted by the Copelands including hydrangeas, camellias and flowering cherries, and exotics such as the ginkgo and various species of palm. They also ensured that the blossoms they nurtured had a wider, if unknowing audience. Mr Ronald Copeland was chairman and later managing director of his family's business, the Spode china factory. Flowers grown at Trelissick were used as models for those painted on ware produced at the works.

The garden is noted for its rare shrubs. It offers a large park, woodland walks, views over the estuary of the River Fal and Falmouth.

The water tower

Unlike the Trebah and Glendurgan gardens located a few miles to the southwest, Trelissick is not a valley garden but rather has the character of a landscaped park. The garden is divided into two sections by a narrow road leading to the car ferry across the River Fal; a small wooden bridge connects the two parts. Thanks to the mild Cornish climate (influenced by the Gulf Stream) it is possible to cultivate a wide range of subtropical and Far Eastern plants outdoors year-round at Trelissick, alongside native species. The garden features yuccas, handkerchief trees, and tree ferns, as well as rhododendrons (a staple plant of southern Cornwall). In late spring and early summer, Trelissick comes alive with the vibrant colours of rhododendron blossoms. A particular highlight is the Japanese cedar situated on the garden's central lawn. The "Parsley Garden" (the estate's original kitchen and herb garden located at the entrance) is also still cultivated and open to visitors.

=== Outbuildings ===
The Copeland family crest, a horse's head, now decorates the weathervane on the turret of the stable block, making a pair with the Gilbert squirrels on the Victorian Gothic water tower, an echo of the family who lived here in the second half of the 19th century (their ancestor, Sir Humphrey Gilbert, was lost at sea in his ship Squirrel after discovering Newfoundland).

=== Special plants ===
Trelissick Garden is the home of the National Plant Collections of photinias and azaras..

=== Gallery ===
The memorial to Ronald and Ida Copeland

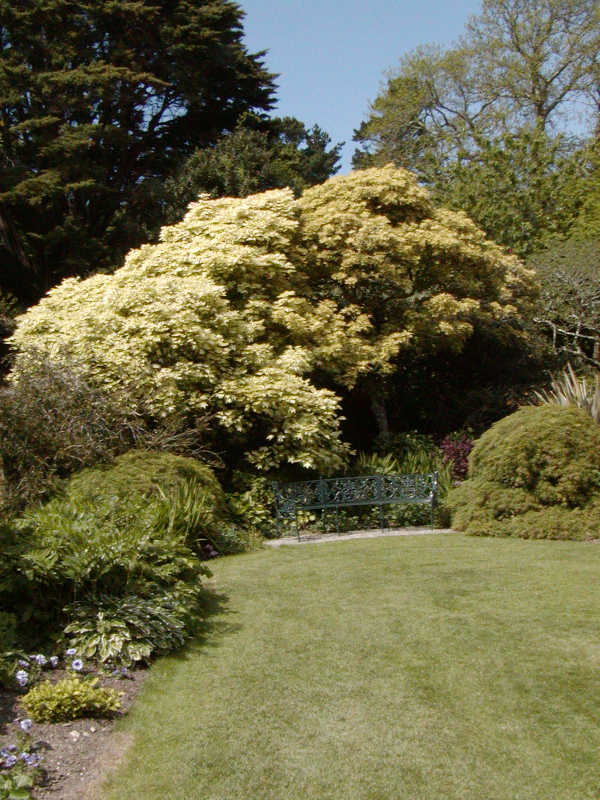
Trelissick view

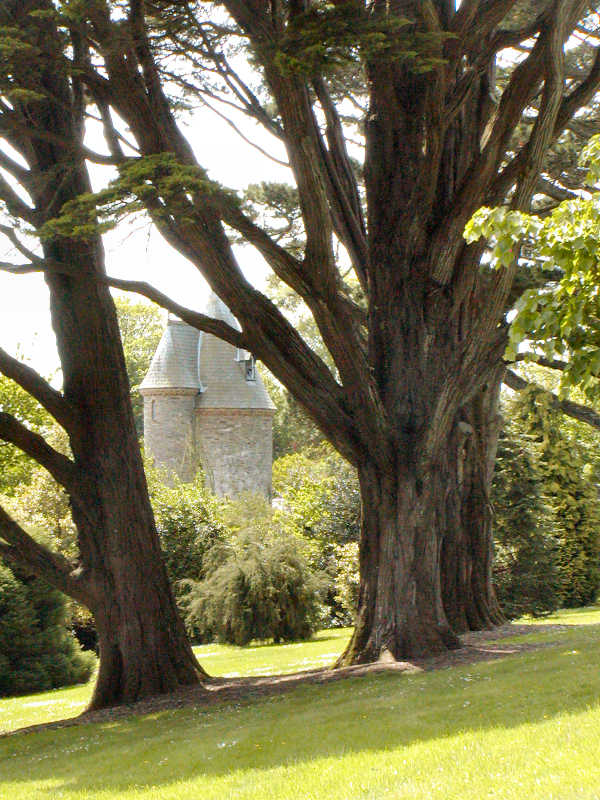
Trelissick view

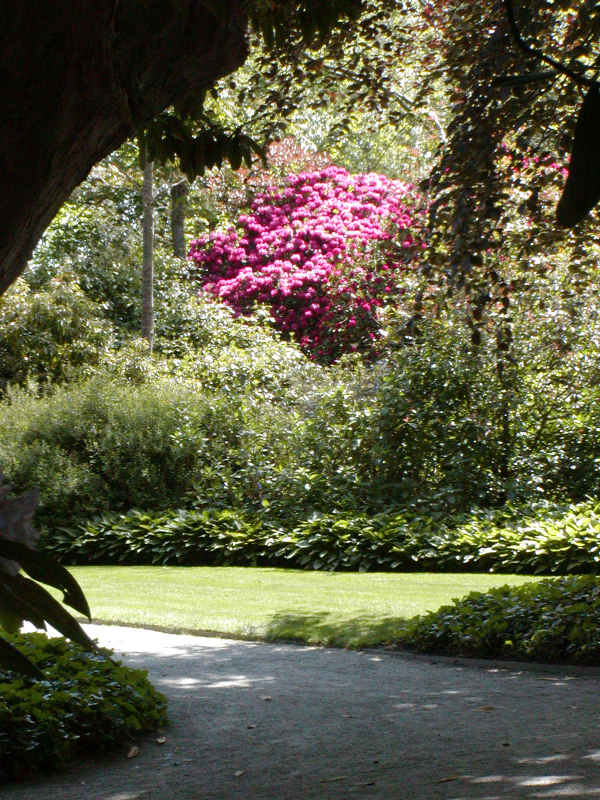
Trelissick view

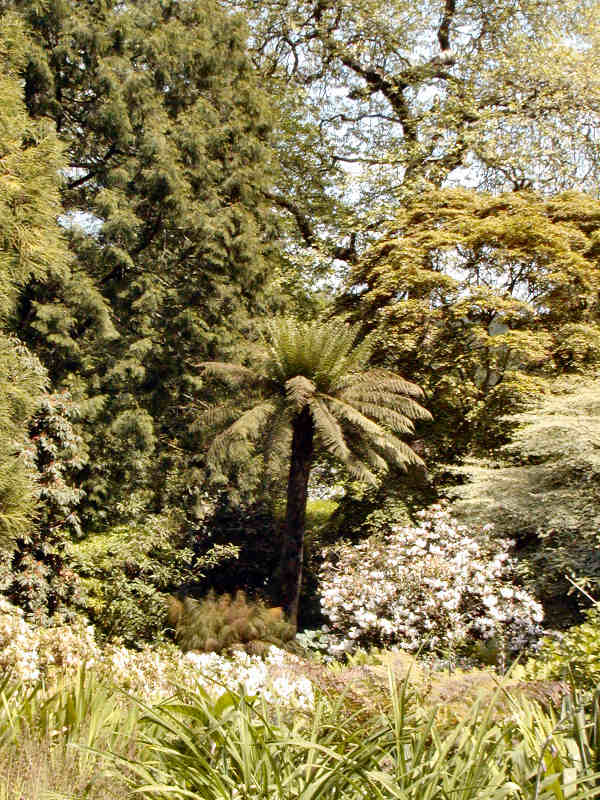
Trelissick view

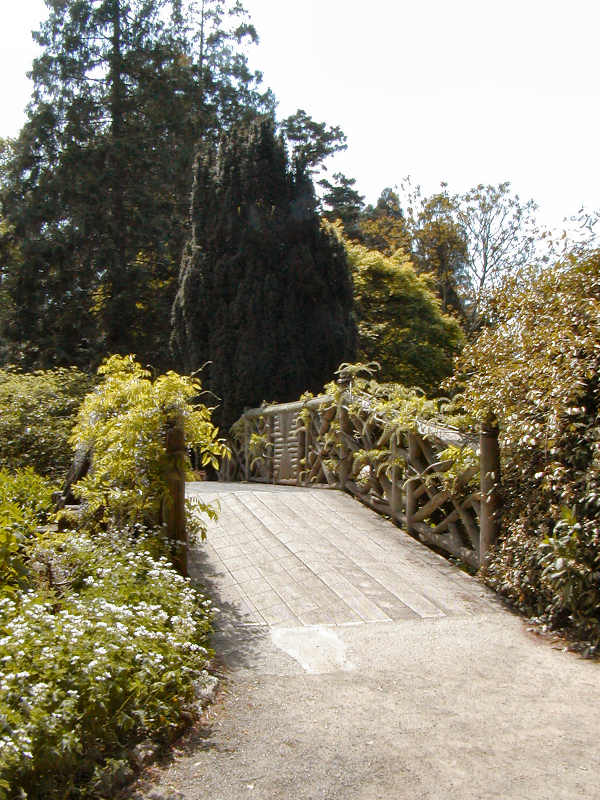
Bridge between the two parts of the garden

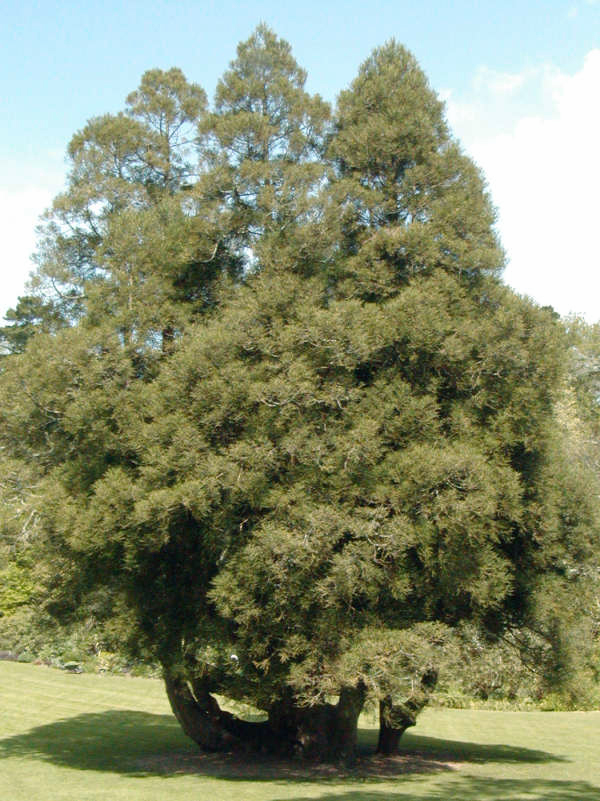
Japanese cedar

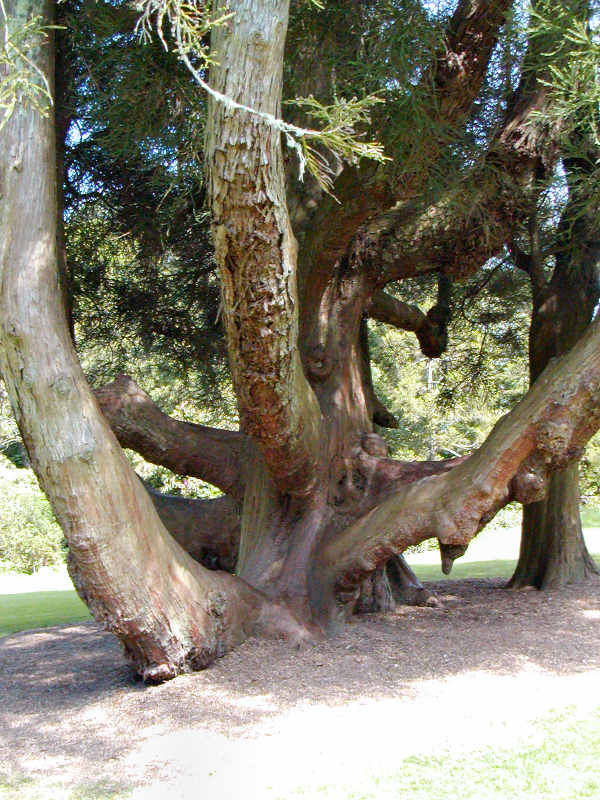
Japanese cedar

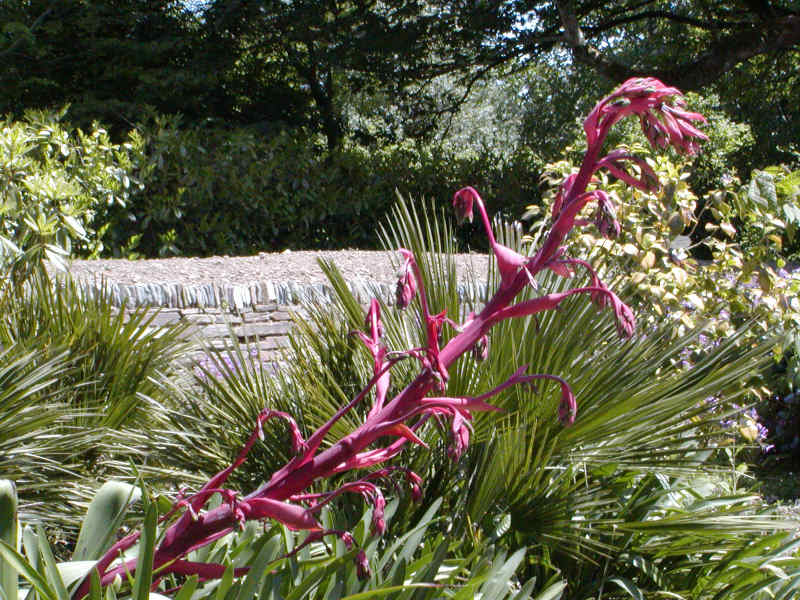
Yucca blossom
