= Carrick Roads =

Estuary of the River Fal in Cornwall, England

Coordinates: 50°09′12″N 5°02′08″W

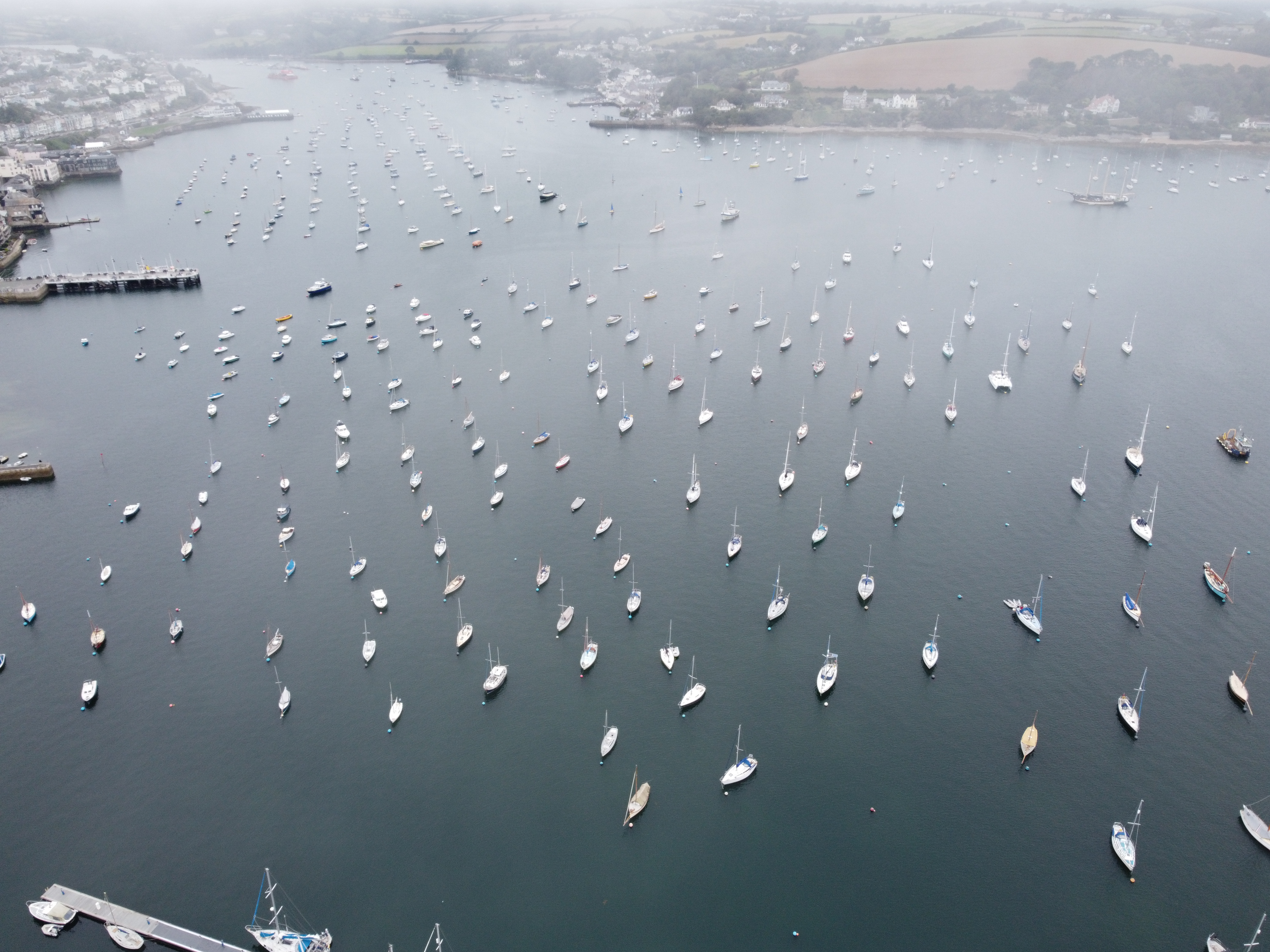
Carrick Roads, estuary of the River Fal. Viewed from the air

Carrick Roads (Cornish: Morlynn an Garrek, meaning lagoon of the rock) is the estuary of the River Fal on the south coast of Cornwall in England. It joins the English Channel at its southern end near Falmouth.

== Geography ==
It is a large flooded valley, or ria, created after the ice age by the melt waters that caused a dramatic rise in sea level, resulting in a large natural harbour which is navigable from Falmouth to Truro. The Carrick Roads have large tidal flows; the water starts to recede six hours and five minutes before high water at Dover. Tidal speeds can reach three knots in the upper parts of the basin and one and a half to two in the lower stretches. The journey from Truro to Falmouth is a Grade A route for kayakers.

The Carrick Roads can be seen well from the Trelissick Peninsula. From this viewpoint the waters stretch away towards Falmouth. On the left is Camerance Point, a tree-clad promontory. The Feock Peninsula is on the right and beyond that is the creek leading to Mylor village, with the Fal Estuary in the distance behind. Nearby lie the gardens of Trelissick House with their oaks, pines, beeches, rhododendrons, azaleas and camellias.

The Roads are crossed by the historic and scenic King Harry Ferry, a vehicular chain ferry that links the parishes of Feock and Philleigh.

== Natural history ==
Carrick Roads and the Fal Estuary are favoured by ornithologists for birdwatching, especially the waders and waterbirds that visit in autumn and winter. The little egret and kingfisher can be seen all year while various passage waders pass through in spring, late summer and autumn. These include the whimbrel, the spotted redshank, the greenshank, the common sandpiper, the curlew sandpiper and the little stint. In the winter, the great northern diver and the black-throated diver can be seen, as well as the black-necked grebe, the red-necked grebe and the Slavonian grebe, the goldeneye and red-breasted merganser, and sometimes the long-tailed duck and the scoter.

== Use as an anchorage ==
Fal Estuary is said to be the third largest natural harbour in the world, of which Carrick Roads itself extends 4 miles (6.4 km) from Black Rock to Turnaware Point with nowhere being less than 1 mile (1.6 km) wide. As a result Carrick Roads has always been an important anchorage especially given that it is at the gateway to the Western Approaches serving shipping arriving from the Atlantic and the Mediterranean. As a result, to protect both ships anchored in it and the harbour itself (whose capture would have made the perfect place for an enemy fleet to establish a foothold during an attack), Henry VIII, who was under threat from Catholic Europe, made plans to construct five artillery forts to protect it. Only Pendennis Castle and St Mawes Castle were built, with the work undertaken between 1540 and 1542.

The waters of the fiord-like Carrick Roads are steep-sided and deep, with depths of 12–14 m (39–46 ft) in many places, and can allow large ships to anchor safely midstream. It is a popular location for layup moorings for a wide variety of commercial vessels, during economic downturns, when changing owners or when being mothballed near the end of their careers.

== Industry ==
A pilchard fishery was still operating in the 1880s. In 1882, at a meeting of the seine owners at St Mawes, it was decided to place a huer (lookout) on a hill, for the first time in a few years, to look out for shoals. Names given to the seines at that time were Diligence, Enterprise, Hope, Onward and St Just.

Truro Council's Oyster Fishery Committee closed the oyster-beds of Mylor and St Just-in-Roseland for two years. The 580 acres (230 ha) beds were over-dredged and shut in September 1883.

== Governance ==
The Falmouth Harbour Commissioners are the statutory port authority with responsibility for the Inner Harbour at Falmouth (excluding Falmouth Docks), the Penryn River up as far as Coastlines Wharf, the southern part of the Carrick Roads and a large part of Falmouth Bay. It issues directions for speed limits in Carrick Roads.

== Gallery ==
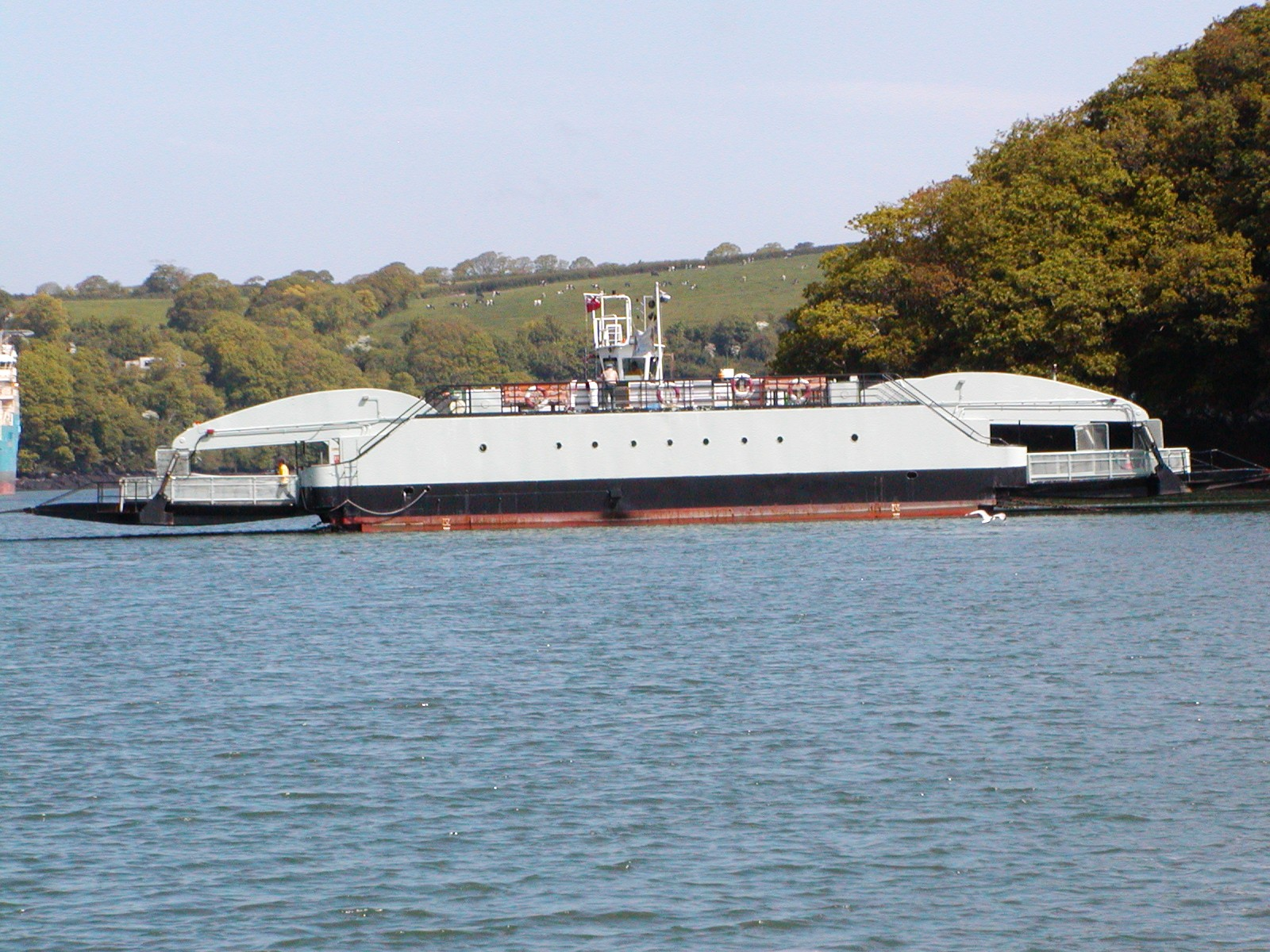
King Harry Ferry between Trelissick and Roseland

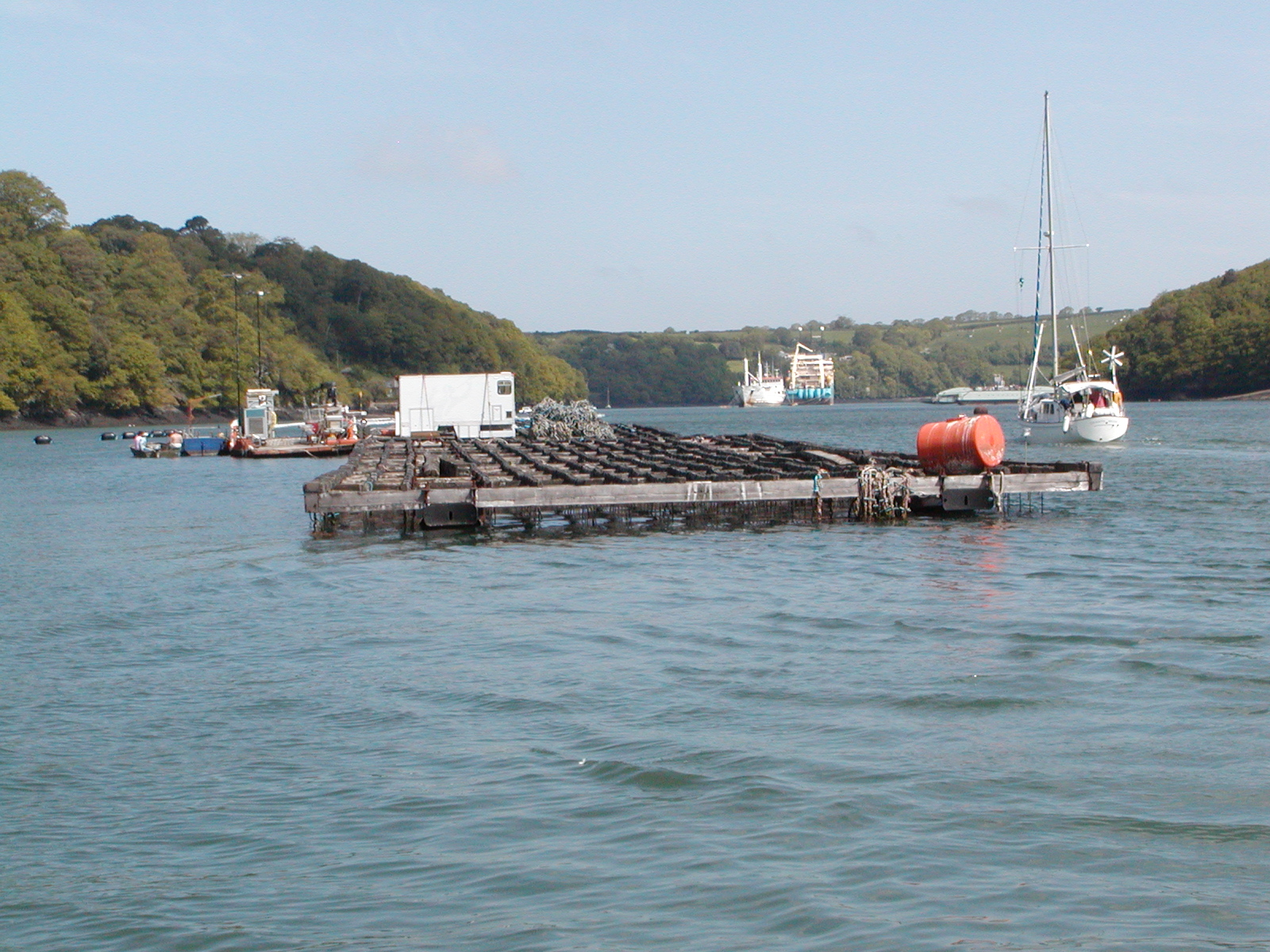
Carrick Roads near Trelissick

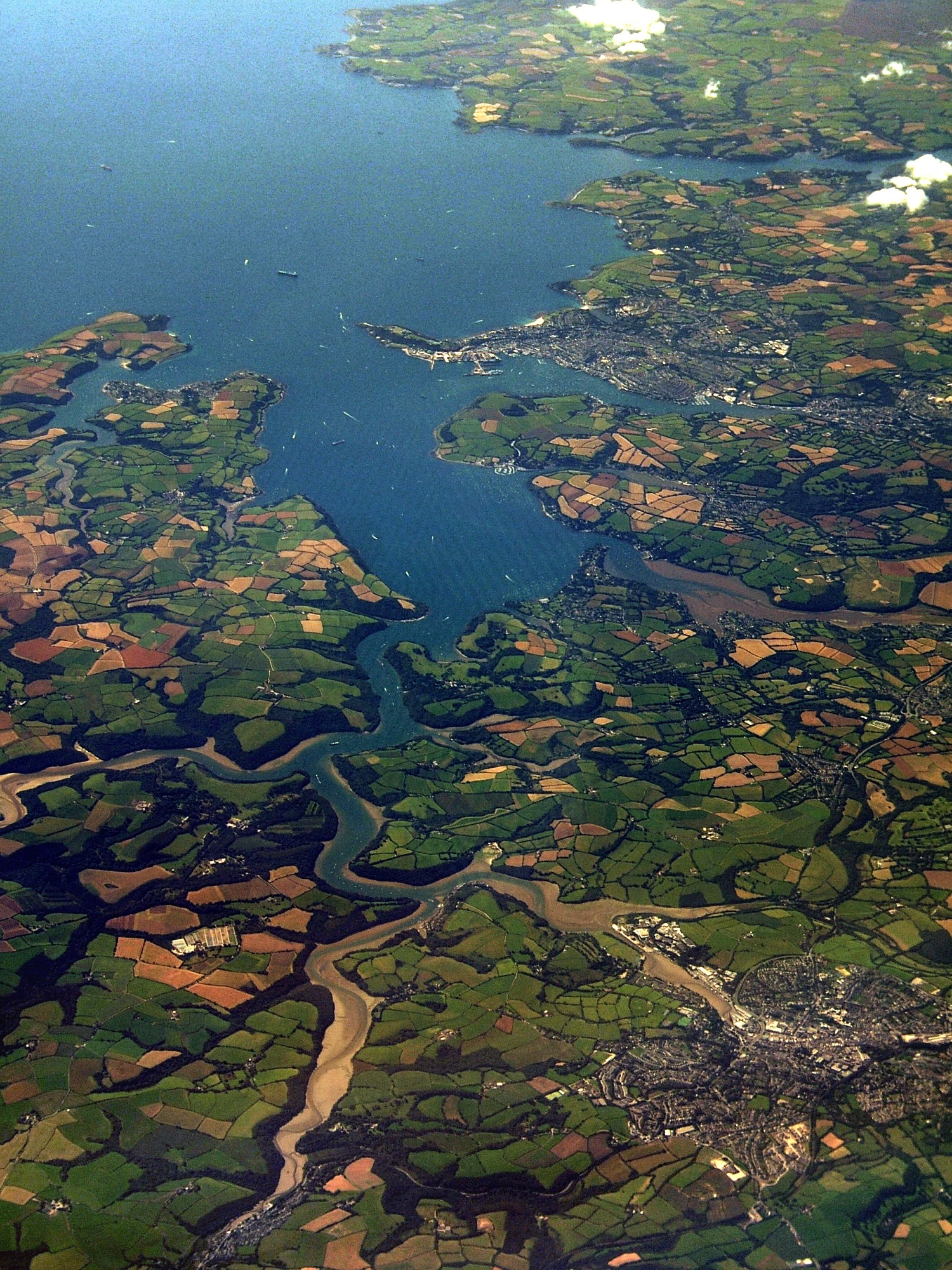
An aerial view showing Carrick Roads, Truro and Falmouth

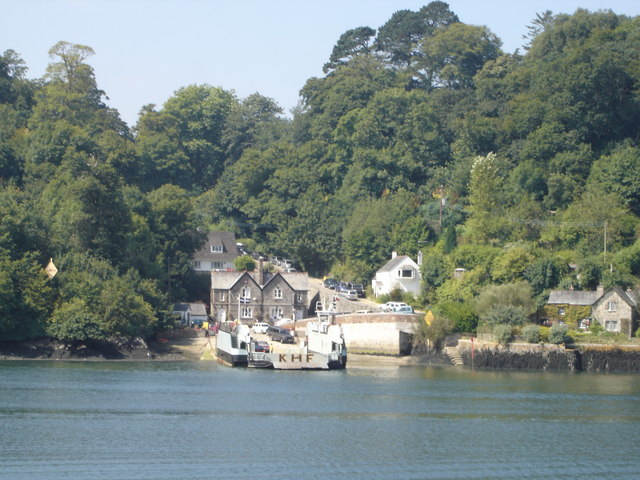
The Feock terminal of the King Harry Ferry in 2005

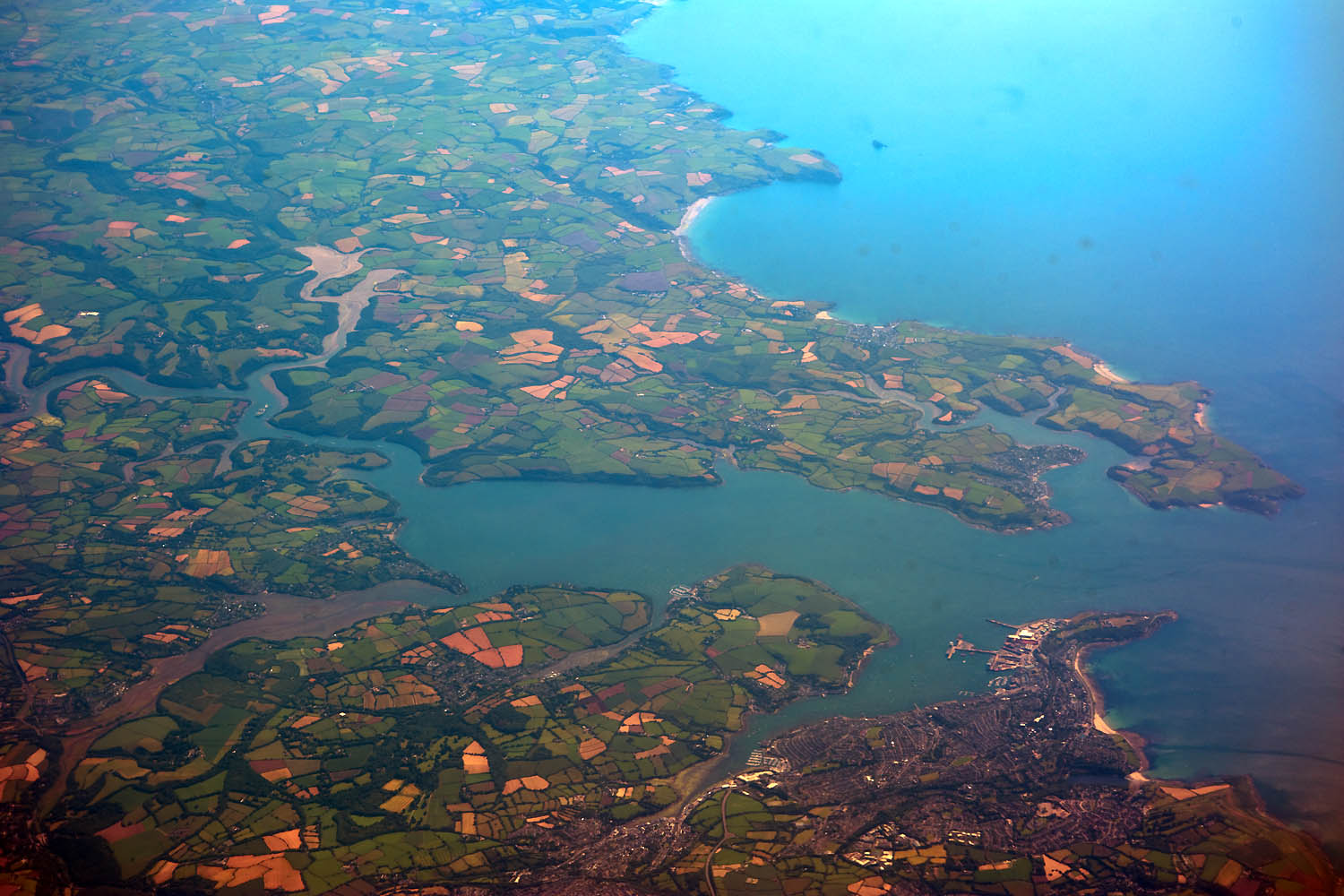
Carrick Roads in Cornwall bordered by Penryn, Falmouth & St. Mawes. Taken from flight AF0349

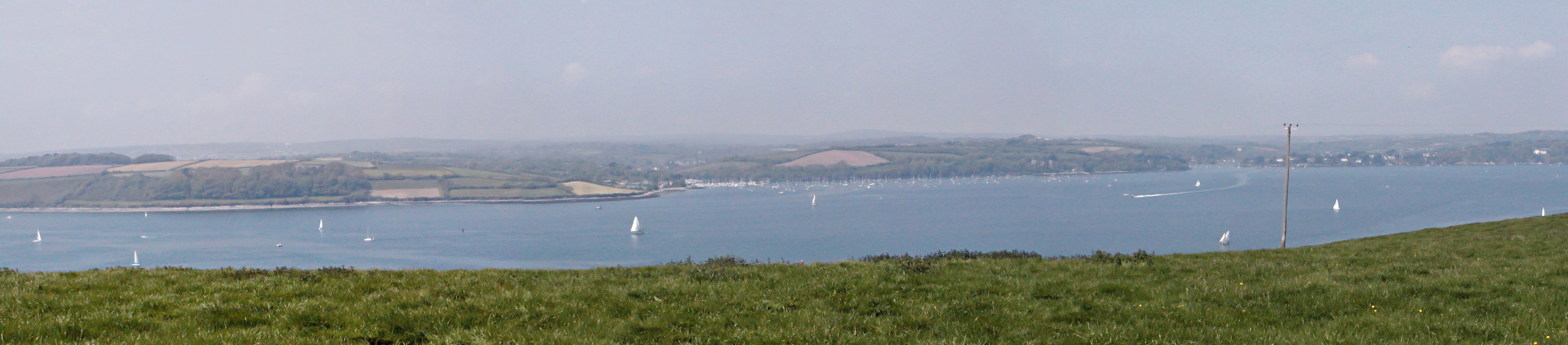
Carrick Roads, as seen from Roseland

== See also ==
- List of deepest natural harbours
