= Philleigh =

Village in Cornwall, England

Coordinates: 50°13′N 4°59′W

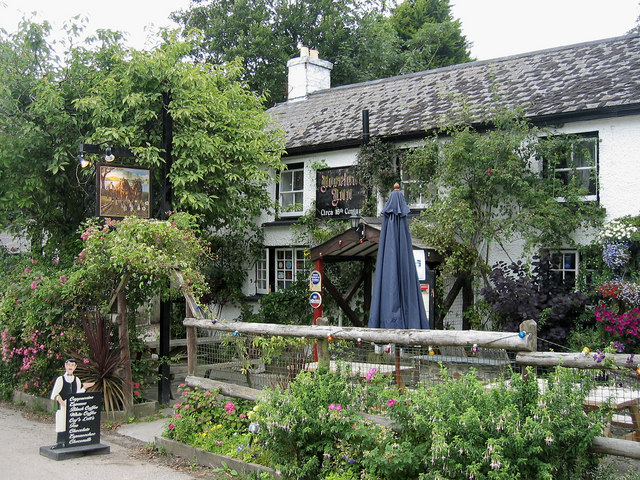
The Roseland Inn

Philleigh (Cornish: Eglosros) is a civil parish and village in Cornwall, England, one of the four civil parishes in the Roseland Peninsula. The civil parish includes the hamlets of Treworlas, Treworthal and a number of smaller settlements.

Philleigh lies within the Cornwall Area of Outstanding Natural Beauty (AONB). Almost a third of Cornwall has AONB designation, with similar status and protection as a National Park.

The village is the home of Roseland Rugby Club which was formed in 1971.

== History ==
The Manor of Eglosrose is mentioned in the Domesday Book and the remainder of the parish was in the episcopal Manor of Tregear. The manor of Eglosrose was one of several held by Thurstan from Robert, Count of Mortain. There was one virgate of land and land for 2 ploughs. There were half a plough, 3 serfs, 3 smallholders, 20 acres of pasture. The value of the manor was 10 shillings.

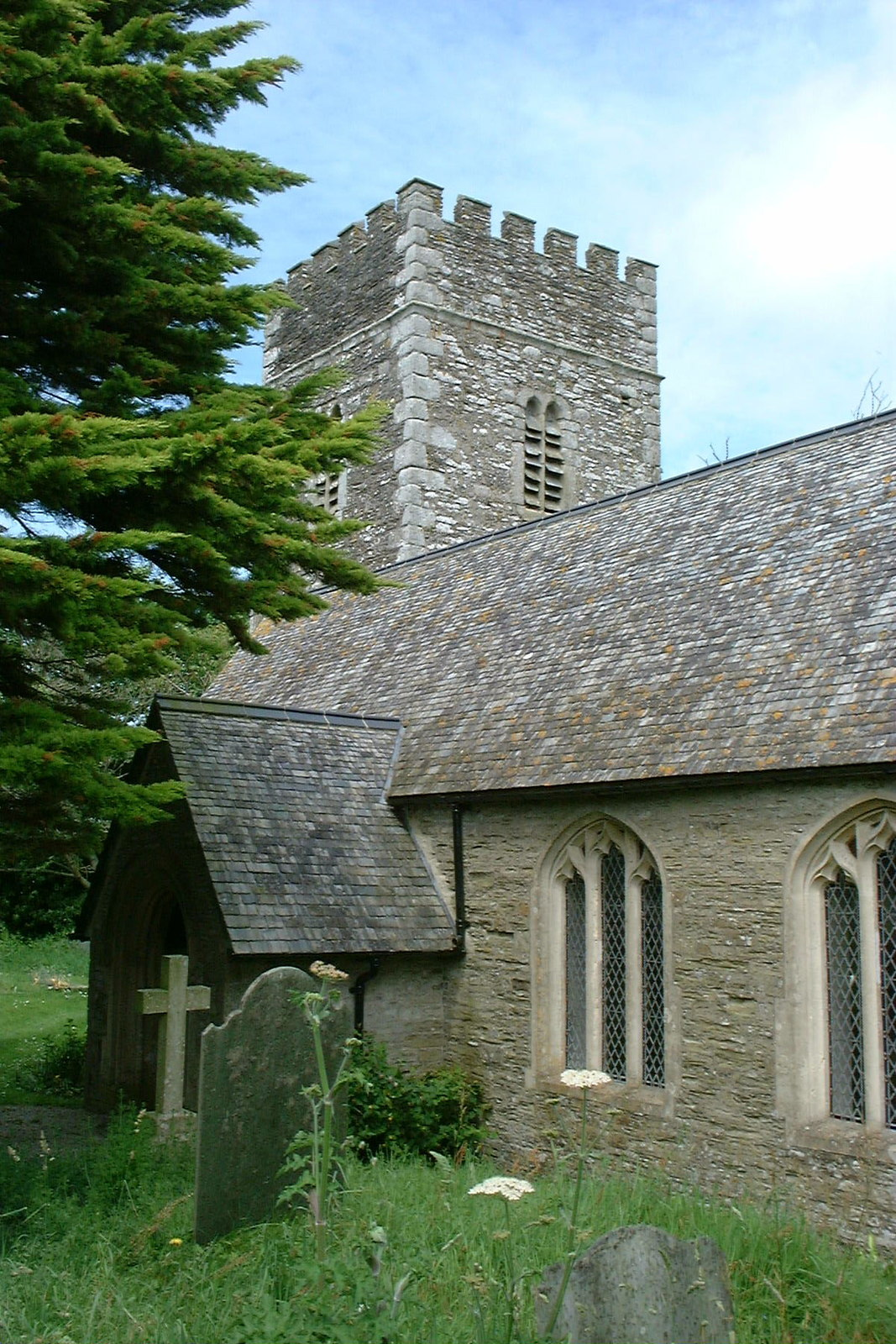
The church of St Fili, Philleigh

The parish church is dedicated to St Fili or Filius. Fili probably came from Wales and is said to have been a companion of St Kea. The church has a west tower, a north transept and a south aisle; the aisle arcade has seven bays and is of white granite on circular piers. The font is octagonal and dates from the 13th century. The Glebe House is slate-hung and has a fine Georgian front of five bays.

The remains of the mansion of the Arundells are at Talverne: associated with it were two medieval chapels, mentioned in 1384. Tolverne Cottage, within the civil parish, was used as an embarkation point for the D-Day landings in World War II.

== Demographics ==
In 2017, 176 people lived in Philleigh. According to 2011 UK census data, 94.3% of residents were born in UK and the most common religion stated was Christian (74%).
