= Percuil River =

River in Cornwall, England

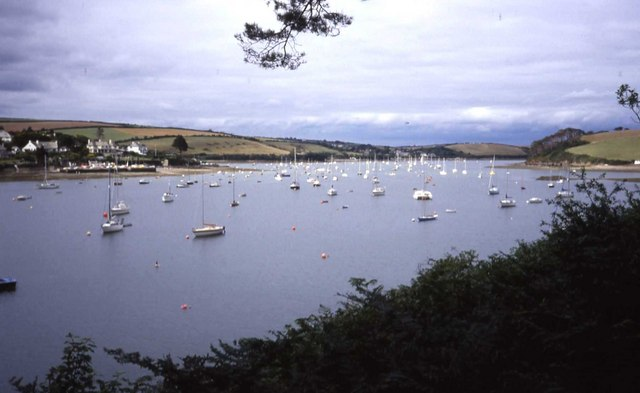
- The Percuil River

Location
- Country: United Kingdom
- Region: Cornwall

Physical characteristics
- Source: Treworlas
  - location: Philleigh
  - coordinates: 50.2077°N 4.9565°W
  - elevation: 45 m (148 ft)
- Mouth: Carrick Roads
  - location: Falmouth Bay
  - coordinates: 50.152°N 5.021°W
- Length: 11 km (6.8 mi)

The Percuil River is an estuary and stream draining the southern part of the Roseland Peninsula of Cornwall, UK and is one of three major tidal creeks of the River Fal. The small port and holiday destination of St Mawes is on the western shore and is linked to Place Creek on the eastern shore by the Place Ferry. The ferry is used by walkers on the South West Coast Path.

== Geography ==
The Percuil River is one of three major tidal creeks of the River Fal which flows into the deep tidal basin of Carrick Roads and out into Falmouth Bay. The creek is actually a ria, or drowned river valley which started to form in the Quaternary period. Sea-level rise during the Ipswichian interglacial flooded the valley, followed by the Devensian glacial, where sea-levels fell to 42 m below today's tides and the River Fal cut a deep sinuous valley into the bedrock. As the climate warmed, sea-levels rose again and the arctic tundra gave way to woodland. The sea continued to rise drowning the trees, leaving peat deposits which have been exposed nearby at Maenporth and Famouth.

The stream and estuary combined is 11 kilometres (6.8 mi) long and rises to the north of the A3078 near Treworthal. The highest tidal limit is at Trethern Mill where the streams runs for 6 kilometres (3.7 mi) to enter the River Fal between Castle Point and Carricknath Point. At Trethern Mill the river is known as Trethem Creek (grid reference SW860350) and there are four named minor creeks on the eastern side of the Percuil River where the valley of small streams enter the estuary. From north to south they are Polingey Creek (grid reference SW863350), Pelyn Creek (grid reference SW861339), Porth Creek (grid reference SW860334) and Place (grid reference SW853324). Within the estuary the steep-sided banks provides a sheltered harbour in contrast to the exposed coast of Falmouth Bay, and the eastern coast of Roseland. The land around is largely anciently enclosed farmland containing well-drained, fine loamy soils with both arable and pastoral farming. Of similar early origin are the network of roads, tracks and farmsteads which surround the stream, with the exception of the lower eastern bank from St Mawes Castle to beyond Povarth Point, which is mostly late 20th-century housing.

== St Mawes ==
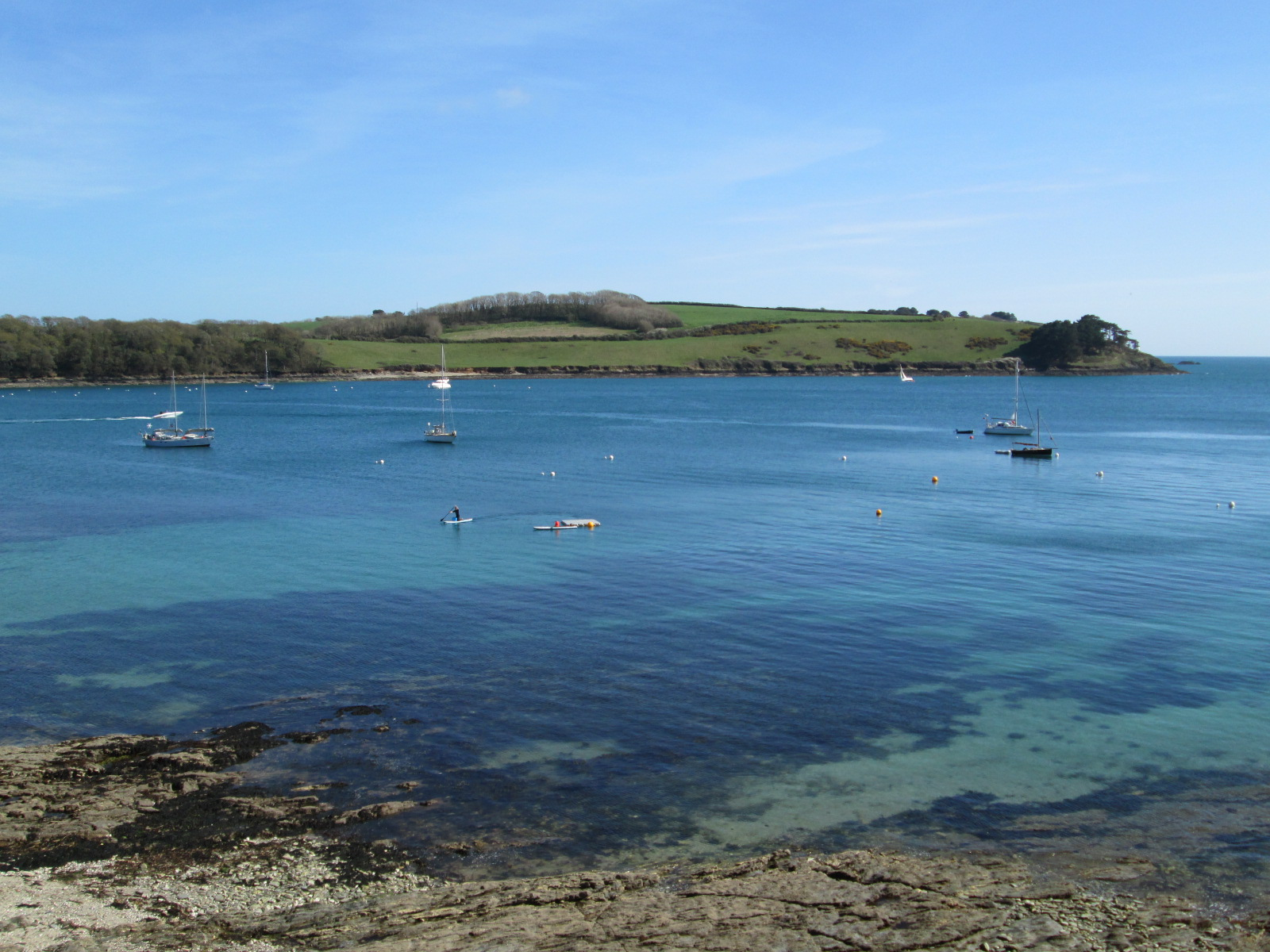
Looking across the Percuil River estuary from St Mawes

First mentioned in 1284 as Lavada or Lavousa (Cornish) and containing the element lann indicating an Early Christian enclosure, St Mawes never became a parish despite, in 1381 having a licensed chapel, cemetery and holy well. The village became a borough in the early 14th-century and the quay was first mentioned in 1539. From medieval times St Mawes was a busy fishing village and port despite being vulnerable to attack from Breton raiders. With the building of St Mawes Castle, one of Henry VIII's device forts which was constructed to the south-west of the village between 1540 and 1542, the open sea became safer. Crab, oyster and the pilchard fisheries developed and pilots could reach incoming ships before their Falmouth rivals. As the port expanded supporting industries such as ropewalks, pilchard cellars and inns developed, and a watch-house was provided for the coastguard service. Maritime industries declined with the opening of the railway to Falmouth in 1863, to be replaced with a passenger steamer service, holiday destination and an exclusive residential and retirement village in the 20th-century.

== Place ==
Opposite St Mawes is the small tidal creek of Place, which is the destination of the Place Ferry from St Mawes, and the departing or landing point for walkers on the South West Coast Path. The boathouse and slipway was used by the Percuil and St Mawes Ferry, for the twice daily steamer from Falmouth and the rowing ferry to St Mawes. Passenger traffic was mainly for estate workers and to take children to school. With the increasing use of roads the ferry became redundant but the service restarted in the 1980s, with the support of the Countryside Agency following the designation of the coast path as a National Trail. The sheltered beach on the southern shore, known as Cellar Beach was once the landing place for large catches of pilchards. Cellar refers to the spot where the pilchards were salted as a winter food for local consumption and for export to Mediterranean countries. Much of the wealth of the Spry family came from their fishing fleet, pilchard cellar and boatbuilding.

The parish of St Anthony in Roseland is mentioned in the Domesday Book when it then belonged to the Bishop of Exeter. Place House is on the site of a small monastic cell which housed an Augustinian priory and one monk dating to sometime after 1140 when the parish was given to the Priory of Plympton in 1288. Place Priory was destroyed by French pirates in 1338 and dissolved in 1538; it is said the stone was quarried for the building of St Mawes Castle. A map of 1597 shows what appears to be an Elizabethan mansion built on the site and belonging to a Mr Davies. The house has been altered and enlarged over the years, and in 1851 remodelled by Sir Samuel Spry, the MP for Bodmin to give Place House its present-day appearance of a French chateau. In front of the house was the pond of a tidal mill which was known to have been in existence in 1540, and would have been used to mill grain for the priory. It was still working in 1812 and the lease was advertised in 1848. The pond was reclaimed from the sea in circa 1860 when the house was rebuilt, and is now the lawn in front of the house. The house was requisitioned by the War Office during World War II.

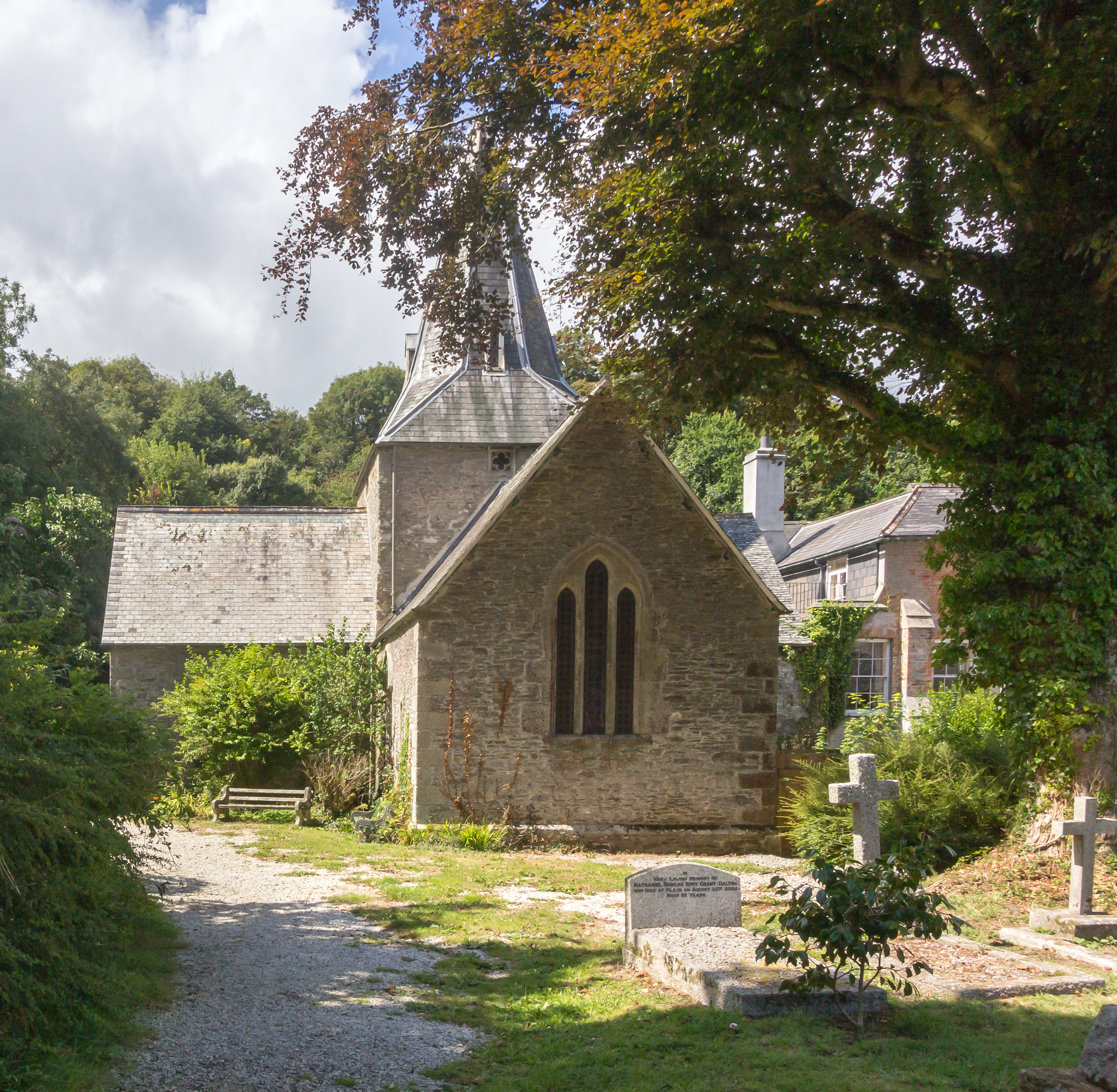
St Anthony's church

St Anthony's church has been described, by Nikolaus Pevsner, as the best example of what a Cornish parish church looked like during the 12th and 13th-centuries. The church is almost unique because it retains it original medieval cruciform plan despite a 19th-century restoration by the Reverend Clement Carlyon, who was employed by his cousin Sir Thomas Spry. Carlyon rebuilt the chancel, designed the pulpit and pews and put in the floor tiles, stained glass and new wooden roof. Place House is next to the church and a room at the back of the house, with large rough carved beams, is said to be the rectory. It is connected to the nave by a door and short flight of steps.

There are monuments to the Spry family who owned Place House including Admiral, Sir Richard Spry (1715–1775) who was Commander-in-Chief, North American Station and Commander-in-Chief, Mediterranean Station.

The church is a Grade II*-listed building and now in the care of the Churches Conservation Trust.

== River trade ==
There are a series of small quays on the west side of the creek which served the farms, and were places where boats could moor while waiting to go upstream on the rising tide. At the head of the estuary was Trethem Quay (grid reference SW861364), where there was a water mill, and coal was still being unloaded well into the 20th-century. There was a lime kiln and pilchard cellars at Trewince Quay (grid reference SW860335) and on the opposite shore at The Priory (grid reference SW857338) was a coal store, lime kiln, malthouse and a quay. As well as the tidal mill, mentioned above, at Point there were another two at the head of Polingey and Porth Creeks.

To the north of Place, and up river, is Percuil (grid reference SW858340) which is the destination of the road which links the river to Gerrans and Portscatho. There were pilchard cellars here in the late 16th-century and during the 19th-century there was a malthouse and coal store. Coal, guano for manure, oysters and roadstone were discharged from barges and ketches on to the beach, which was also used for ship repair and cleaning. The St Mawes steamer was met twice daily by a wagonette from Gerrans for mail and passengers and the 19th-century slipway still exists. To the south is an oyster keep.

In the 19th-century there were boatyards with associated quays and pilchards cellars around Polvarth Point (grid reference SW854327), and at Freshwater Beach to the north there was a boatyard founded by the Peters family in 1790. The Freshwater Beach yard built working boats and was famous for their six-oar pilot gigs. World War II D-Day landing craft were converted and maintained at Polvarth. During the 20th-century St Mawes expanded along the west side of the estuary and Polvarth is now part of the village.

== Recreation ==
The St Mawes to Place ferry links the two shores of the Percuil River and is necessary for those walking the 630 miles (1,014 km) South West Coast Path, which runs from Minehead in Somerset, along the coasts of Devon and Cornwall, to Poole Harbour in Dorset. The ferry can also be used for shorter walks along the river and creeks and to visit Portscatho and St Anthony Head.

== See also ==
- River Fal
- List of rivers of England
