= William Spry (disambiguation) =

William Spry (1864–1929) was an American politician and the third Governor of Utah.

William Spry may also refer to:

- William Spry (British Army officer) (1734–1802), an officer based in Halifax, Nova Scotia during the American Revolutionary War
- William Spry (colonial administrator), governor of Barbados 1768–1772

== See also ==
- Spry family
