= Codex Reginensis Latinus 191 =

9th-century manuscript

- Vatican Library, MS Reg. lat. 191
- Date: c. 9th–10th centuries
- Place of origin: Reims
- Language: Latin
- Material: Vellum

Codex Reginensis Latinus 191 (shelfmark Reg.lat.191) is a 9th-century codex compiled at the Abbey of Saint-Remi in Reims and now held in the Vatican Library. The codex is notable for the text fragments contained within its binding, which include parts of De Moribus by pseudo-Seneca, De Viris Illustribus by Jerome, and a 10th-century list of Brittonic patron saints.

== History ==
The manuscript was previously in the collections of Alexandre Pétau, son of Paul Pétau, and Christina, Queen of Sweden.

== Contents ==
The codex is a collection of ecclesiastical texts, including works by Isidore of Seville, Augustine of Hippo, Pelagius, Ebbo, Hincmar, Alcuin, and Prudentius of Troyes.

== Binding ==
Two fragmentary Latin texts are found in the folia (Note: Specifically, fols. ii–v and 104–105 contain the Latin texts and Brittonic name list.) used to bind the codex: De Moribus by pseudo-Seneca, and a chapter on Seneca in De Viris Illustribus by Jerome. It is not known whether these were originally bound into a text on their own or as part of a larger manuscript. De Moribus and Jerome on Seneca are both written in a Breton Carolingian minuscule script which dates c. 885–915. One line of De Moribus on fol. 105R is corrected using the Insular script, probably by the same hand which wrote the name list.

=== Saint list ===
The list of Brittonic saints was first discussed in 1938 by French academics, although they did not identify the connection with Cornwall.

The origin of the fragment is probably in Brittany, where the list was likely added onto an existing Breton manuscript, which later became the binding of the Reims codex. The list is written using an Insular minuscule script, which is distinct from the Breton Carolingian minuscule used for the adjacent Latin fragments. The use of the Insular script, rather than the Carolingian script, has been interpreted as an indicator that the scribe could have been of British origin or that the manuscript was brought to Cornwall where the list was added.

Forty-eight Brittonic personal names are recorded in the list. Twenty-one of these are patron saints of churches in Cornwall (some of whom have associations elsewhere in the Brittonic region), nine are possibly identifiable with known Cornish saints, two are associated with non-parish holy sites in Cornwall, one (Iodechall) is a known Brittonic saint with no association with Cornwall, and fifteen are unidentified or illegible. Around half of the names are certainly associated with Cornwall, and the ordering of the names correlates geographically with parish dedications in Cornwall. Therefore, B. Lynette Olson and O. J. Padel identify the list as "unquestionably a list of Cornish saints, at least in part."

The names, in the original order, are the following:

1. Salamun, patron of St Levan
2. Guenosam, possibly identifiable as the patron of St Gennys
3. Barmot, unidentified
4. Cuncar, possibly patron of a holy well and medieval chapel at St Ingunger, Lanivet
5. Cioc, unidentified, possibly the same as Cuncar
6. Guenb... (missing letters, perhaps Guenbet), unidentified
7. Ruaton, unidentified
8. Guicmor, unidentified
9. Iust, patron of St Just in Penwith, St Just in Roseland, and a well in Probus
10. Entenin, patron of St Anthony-in-Meneage and St Anthony in Roseland
11. Gerent, patron of Gerrans, as well as two chapels in Magor, Monmouthshire and Dol-de-Bretagne respectively
12. Filii, patron of Philleigh
13. Rumon, patron of Ruan Major, Ruan Minor, Ruan Lanihorne, a chapel in Redruth, and formerly patron of Audierne and Saint-Jean-Trolimon
14. Comet, unidentified
15. Meler, patron of Linkinhorne and Mylor
16. Sibillon, possibly the original dedication of St Symphorian's Church in Veryan
17. Maucan, patron of St Mawgan in Pydar and Mawgan-in-Meneage
18. Achobran, patron of St Keverne
19. Berion, patron of St Buryan
20. Felec, patron of Phillack
21. Guidian, patron of Gwithian
22. Erbec, unidentified but possibly connected to three church dedications to a St Hermes
23. Nioth (or Rioth), unidentified
24. Propus, patron of Probus
25. Latoc, patron of Ladock
26. Luidin, unidentified
27. Pierguin, unidentified
28. Geuedenoc, identified with Wethenoc
29. ...uai
30. ...nu or ...in
31. ...cu
32. Iogarun, unidentified
33. Gernun (uncertain transcription), possibly connected to the patron of St Germans
34. Lallu, probably patron of Menheniot
35. Be...en, possibly Berguen
36. Entr?r? or Ent...i
37. Bie, unidentified
38. Elenn, unclear connection to other similarly named saints, possibly the former patron of St Stephen-in-Brannel
39. Austoll, patron of St Austell
40. Megunn, patron of St Mewan
41. Iodechall, attested in Breton litanies and a hagiography, no patronages
42. Crite, patron of Creed and possibly of Saint-Cry in Brittany
43. Guron, patron of Goran
44. Euai, patron of St Ewe
45. Gu?ai, unidentified, perhaps connected to a Welsh saint Gwrai
46. Memai, identified with Meva, co-patron of Mevagissey
47. Iti, patron of St Issey and co-patron of Mevagissey
48. Aboel, unidentified
