= Humphrey Hopper =

English sculptor

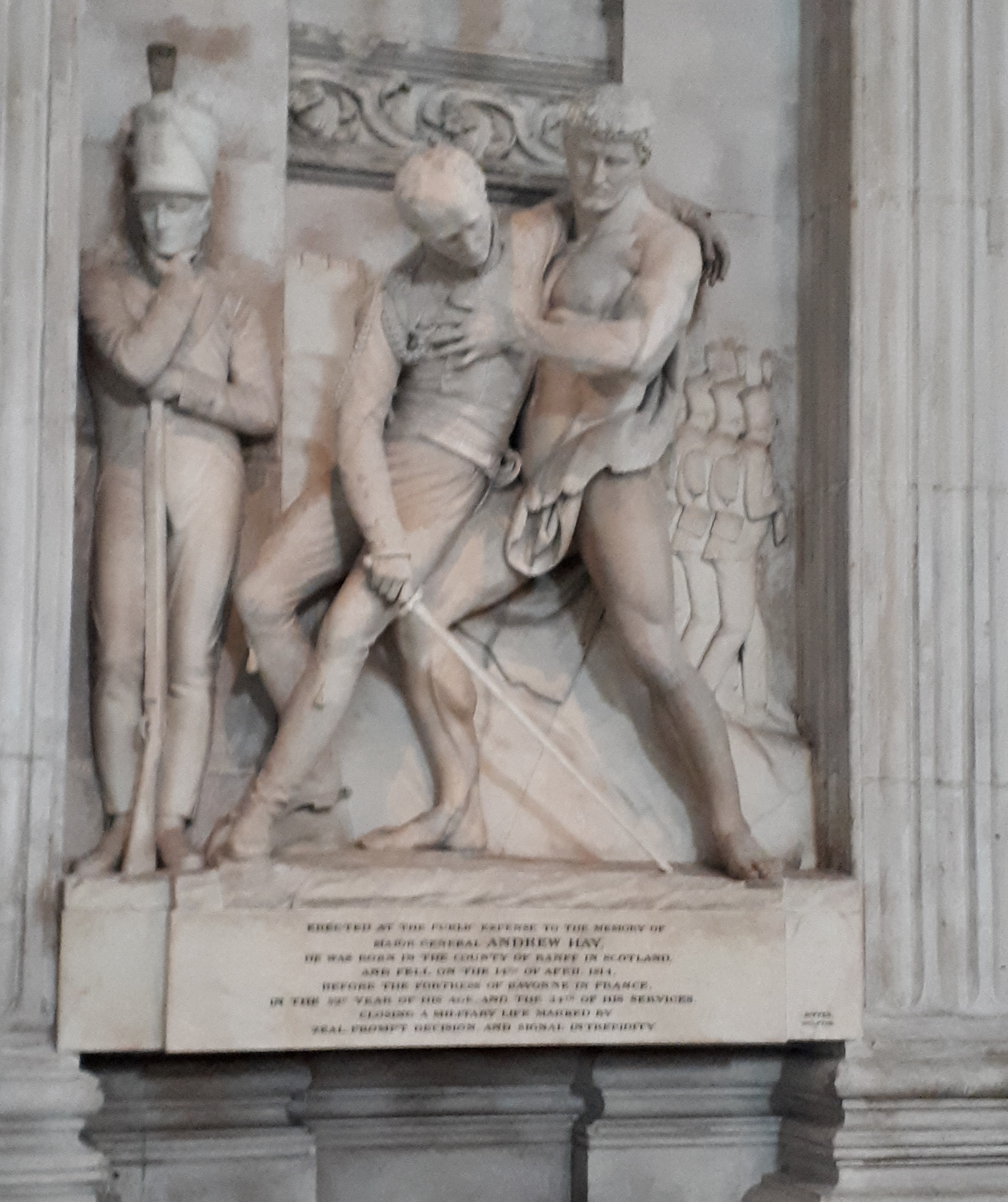
Memorial to Maj Gen Andrew Hay at St Paul's Cathedral

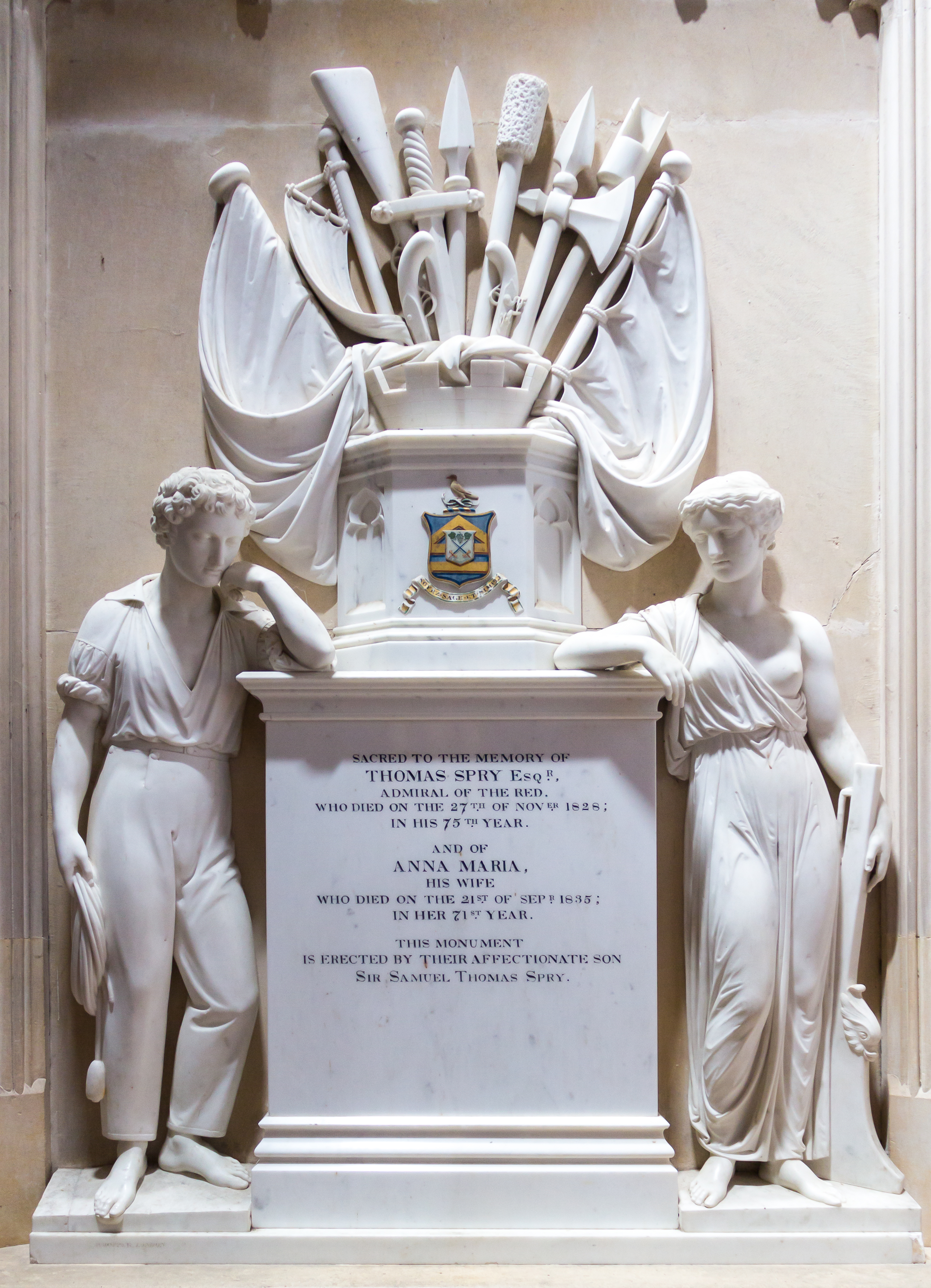
Memorial to Admiral Spry in St Anthony's church in Roseland

Humphrey Hopper (1767–1844) was an English sculptor and stonemason. He was given the government commission for the memorial in St Paul's Cathedral to General Andrew Hay.

== Life ==
He was born in Wolsingham in County Durham in 1765. He moved to London around 1800.

Hopper studied in the Royal Academy Schools during his thirties, from 1801, already having exhibited at the Royal Academy from 1799. He gained the silver medal there in 1802 and the gold medal there in 1803, for an original group of The Death of Meleager.

In 1807 Hay was a competitor for the Pitt and Nelson memorials in the London Guildhall. He developed a line of plaster figures designed to hold lamps, working with architects who designed niches for them, such as Lewis Wyatt. He lived in the Marylebone area of London, settling in Wigmore Street.

Hopper died on 27 May 1844 at 13 Wigmore Street, Marylebone. He is buried in Kensal Green Cemetery.

== Works ==
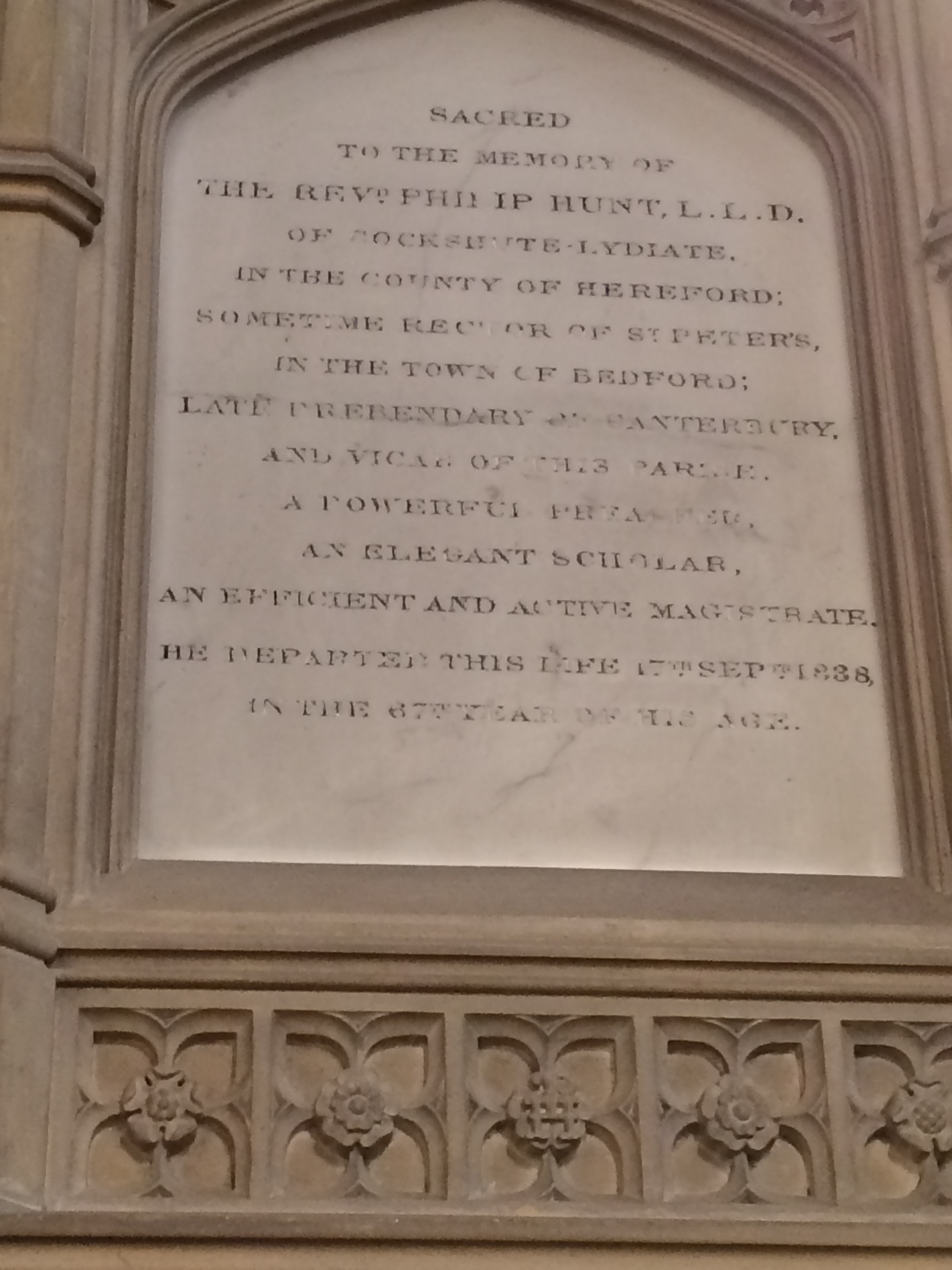
Memorial to Philip Hunt in the Church of St Michael, Aylsham, by Hopper

Hopper executed some classical figures, but in later life concentrated on work as a monumental mason, including memorial busts. and monuments. Monuments included those to:

- Josiah Spode II (1827) in Stoke-on-Trent Parish Church
- Sir William Curtis, 1st Baronet (1829) in Ramsgate in Kent
- Admiral Eliab Harvey (1830) in Hempsted, Essex
- John Henry North (1831) in Harrow Parish Church
- Robert Hooper (1835) in Shoreham-by-Sea
- Admiral Richard Spry (1835) in St Anthony's on Roseland, Cornwall
- Sir William Coles Medlycott, 1st Baronet (1835) in Milborne Port
- Admiral Sir John Hood (1838) Marylebone Parish Church

The public monument to Major-General Hay in St Paul's Cathedral was criticised, in particular by George Lewis Smyth (1800–1853) who objected to the nakedness of the figure of Hercules poised to catch the falling Hay. From 1815 Hopper exhibited a series of busts at the Royal Academy, showing for the last time there in 1834.
