= St Mawes' Church, St Mawes =

Church in Cornwall, England

St Mawes’ Church, St Mawes
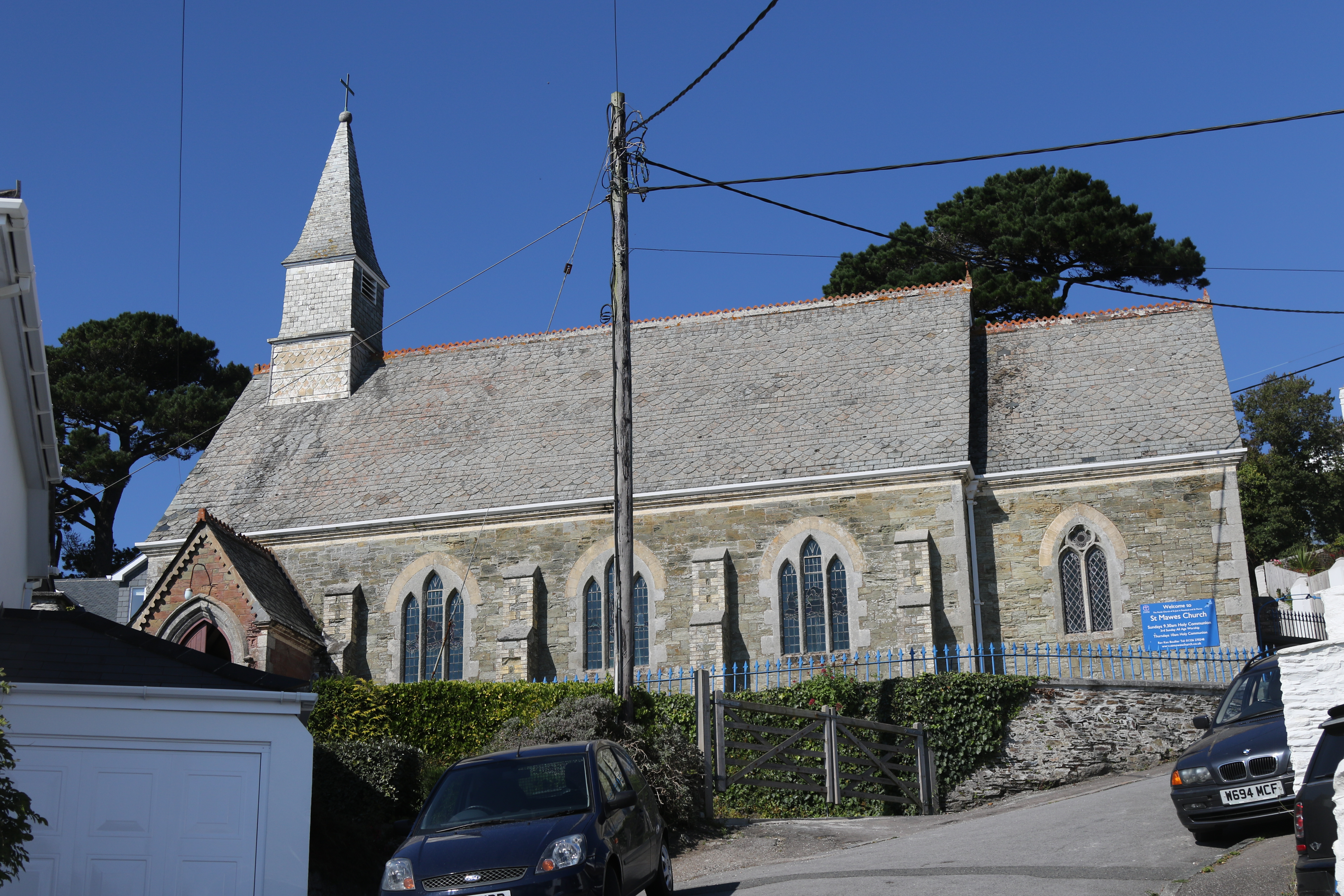
- St Mawes’ Church, St Mawes
- St Mawes’ Church, St Mawes
- 50°09′27.68″N 5°01′1.22″W
- Location: St Mawes
- Country: England
- Denomination: Church of England

History
- Dedication: Saint Mawes

Architecture
- Heritage designation: Grade II listed
- Groundbreaking: 1883
- Completed: 5 December 1884
- Construction cost: £1,500

Specifications
- Capacity: 250 persons

Administration
- Province: Province of Canterbury
- Diocese: Diocese of Truro
- Archdeaconry: Cornwall
- Deanery: Powder
- Parish: St Just in Roseland

St Mawes’ Church is a Grade II listed parish church in the Church of England Diocese of Truro in St Mawes, Cornwall, England, UK.

== History ==
The name of the town comes from Saint Maudez, a Breton saint, and there was a chapel here dedicated to him with his holy well nearby. Its existence in 1427 is mentioned in George Oliver's Monasticon and it remained in use until the reign of Elizabeth I when it was abandoned. From that time until c. 1838 there was no chapel for the townspeople until a private chapel built in 1807 by the Earl Temple (afterwards Marquis and then Duke of Buckingham) was licensed by the Bishop. This was on a different site and was built between 1881 and 1884. St Mawes continued however to be in the parish of St Just in Roseland.

The new church to serve the town of St Mawes was opened by the Bishop of Truro Dr George Wilkinson on 5 December 1884. It was built in the Early English style, and consists of a chancel, nave, porch and bell turret. It was built of local stone with facings of St Stephen’s granite. The west window was given by the daughter of Staff-Commander Vincent of Southampton in memory of her parents and cost 100 guineas. The chancel window is a gift of the relatives of Miss Cullah who died whilst on a visit to St Mawes. The north and south chancel windows were presented by Mrs Kennerley and Mrs Payne. The building cost £1,500 and was designed by Revd. C. W. Carlyon.

== Parish status ==
The church is in a joint parish with

- St Just’s Church, St Just in Roseland
