= Saint Maudez =

Breton saint

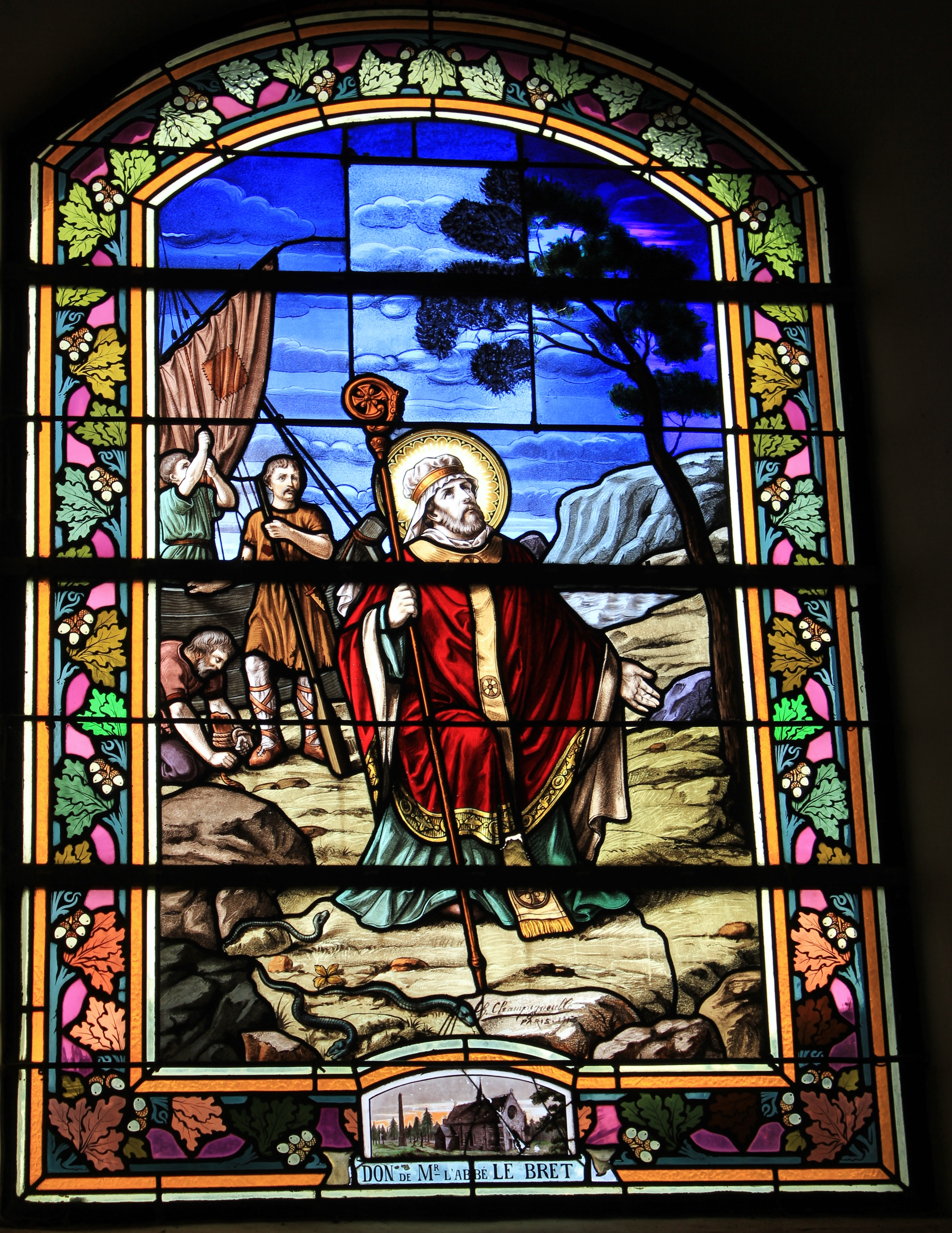
- Saint Maudez
- Feast: November 18

Maudez is a Breton saint who lived in the 5th or 6th century. He is also known as Maudé, Maudet (Breton French), Maodez or Modez (Breton), Maudetus (Latin), Mandé (French) and Mawes (in Cornwall). In the Breton calendar his feast is 18 November.

== Biography ==
Maudez is variously said to have come from Ireland, or Wales, but most sources say Brittany. He first settled on the south coast of Cornwall where the village of St Mawes took his name. A chapel dedicated to him was subsequently abandoned during the reign of Elizabeth I. A second chapel was built by the Earl Temple on Church Hill in 1807; and rebuilt in 1881. St Mawes' Church was opened by the Bishop of Truro George Wilkinson on 5 December 1884. Local opinion holds that St Mawes built the first landing at the harbour to help pilgrims access his Holy Well, which is preserved on nearby Grove Hill.

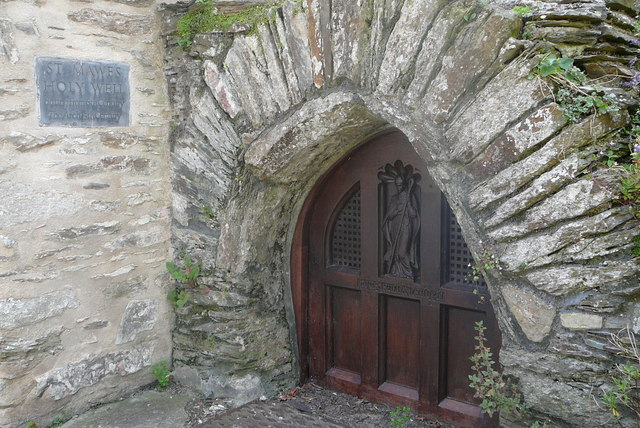
St Mawes holy well

Mawes then went to Brittany and tradition has it that he landed in Pleubian. From there, he visited many monasteries in the region of Tréguier, Dol and the country of Leon. He built his first hermitage at Lanmodez (enclosure of Modez or Maudez). He moved to the small deserted island of Gueldénez (now called Île Maudez] in the Bréhat archipelago where he settled with two disciples, Budoc and Tudy of Landevennec probably in the second half of the 5th century. Traces of a beehive hut known as Forn Modez (Maudez's oven) are visible on the island. Budoc later founded a monastery on the nearby island of Laurea.

== Veneration ==
Maudez is, after Yves, one of the most revered among the saints of Brittany. He is invoked mainly against fevers and snakes. In the 9th century his relics were taken to Bourges and to Saint-Mandé (Saint-Maudez), near Paris to escape from the Normans. There a chapel was dedicated to Saint-Maudez. When the relics were returned to Brittany, they were divided between nine churches. The church of Lennon, Finistère preserves a reliquary of Saint Maudez.

Mawes is venerated at Saint Mawes in Cornwall and in the Isles of Scilly under the name Saint Mawes. St Mawes Day is celebrated on 18 November. In Lanmodez, a pardon takes place on the 4th Sunday of August.

== Legacy ==
- The village of Saint-Maudez is in the canton of Plélan-le-Petit.
- More than 60 churches or chapels are dedicated to the saint, e.g. Guiscriff, Lanvellec.
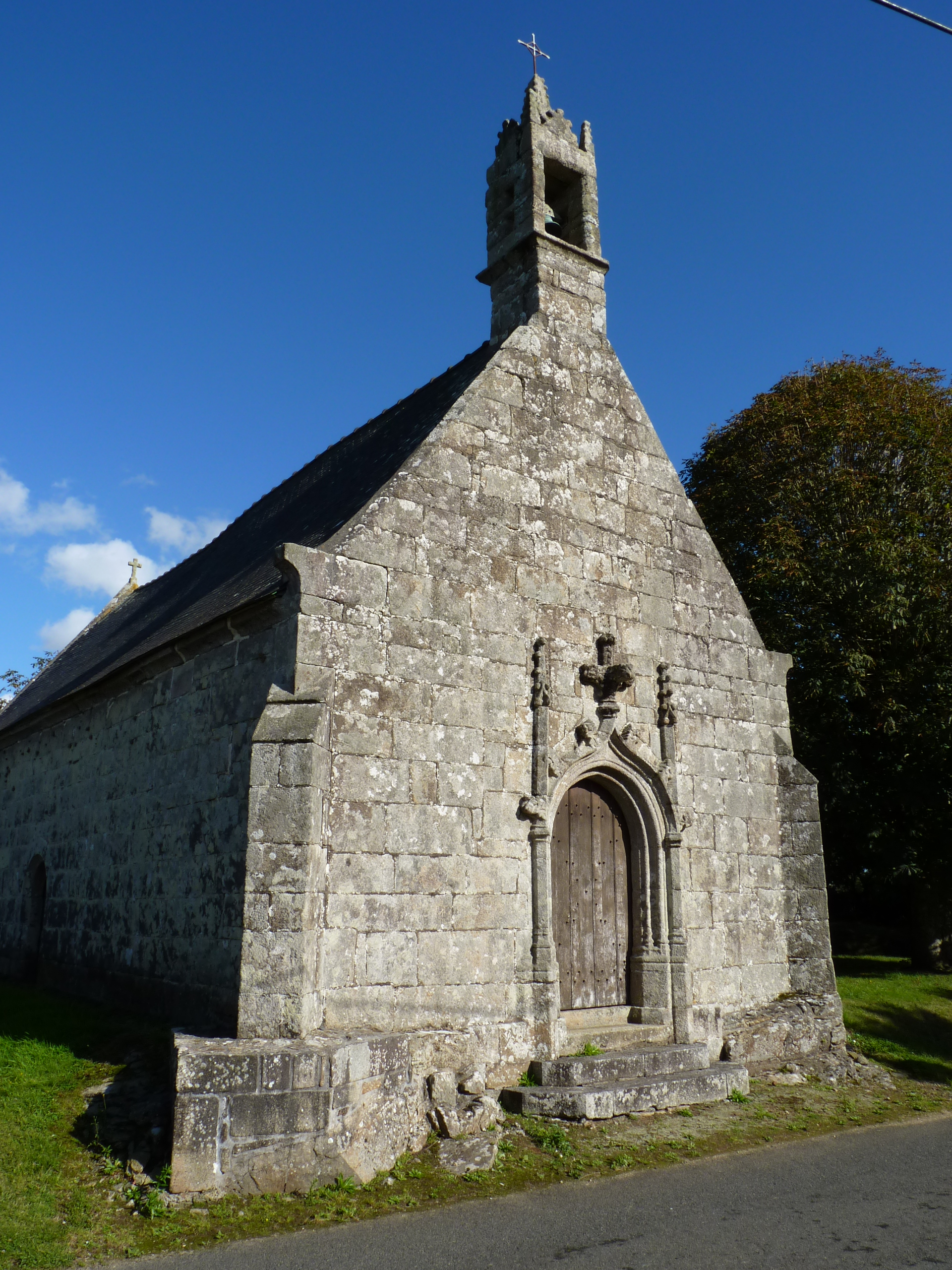
Chapelle Saint-Maudez de Lanvellec

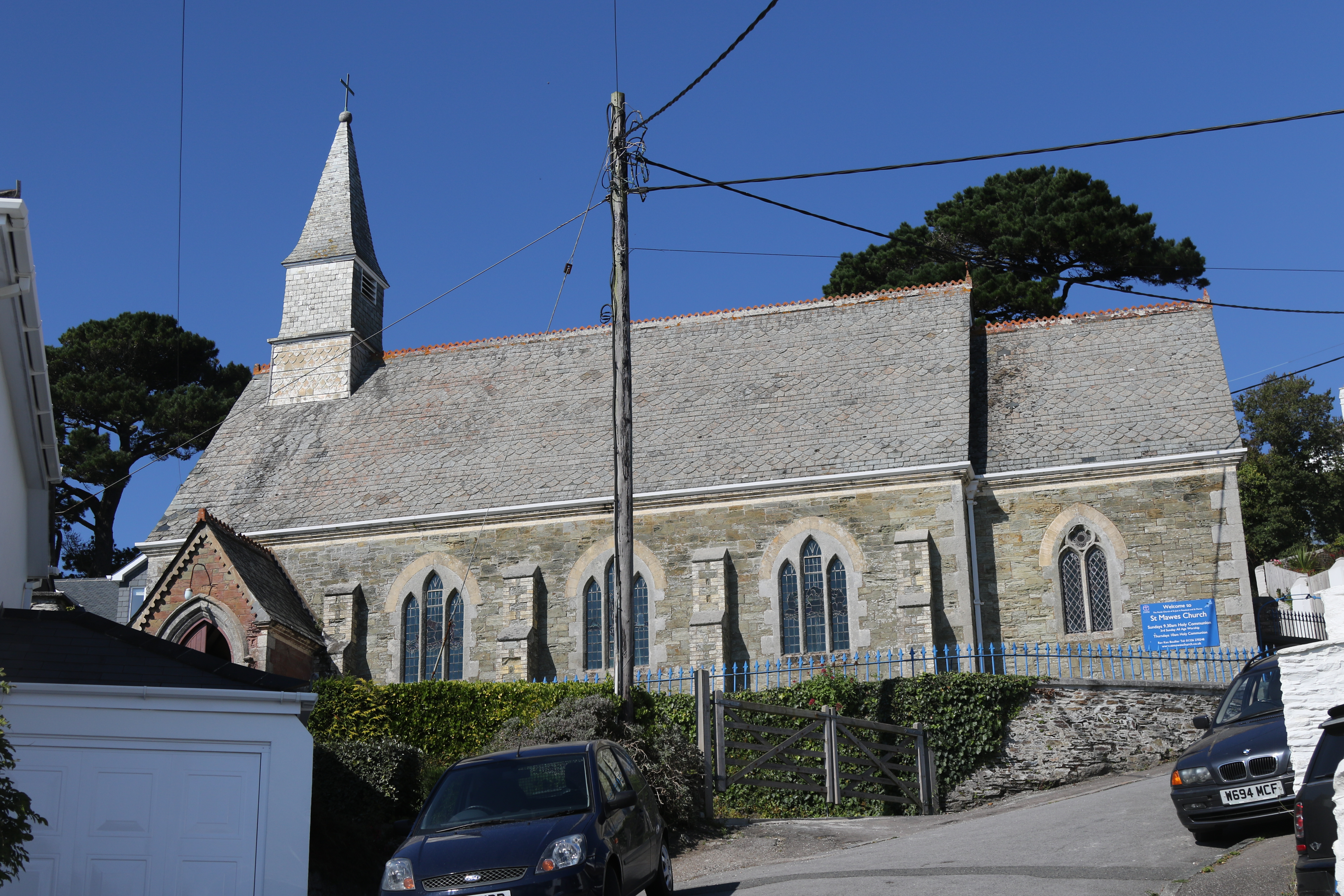
St Mawes' Church, St Mawes, Cornwall

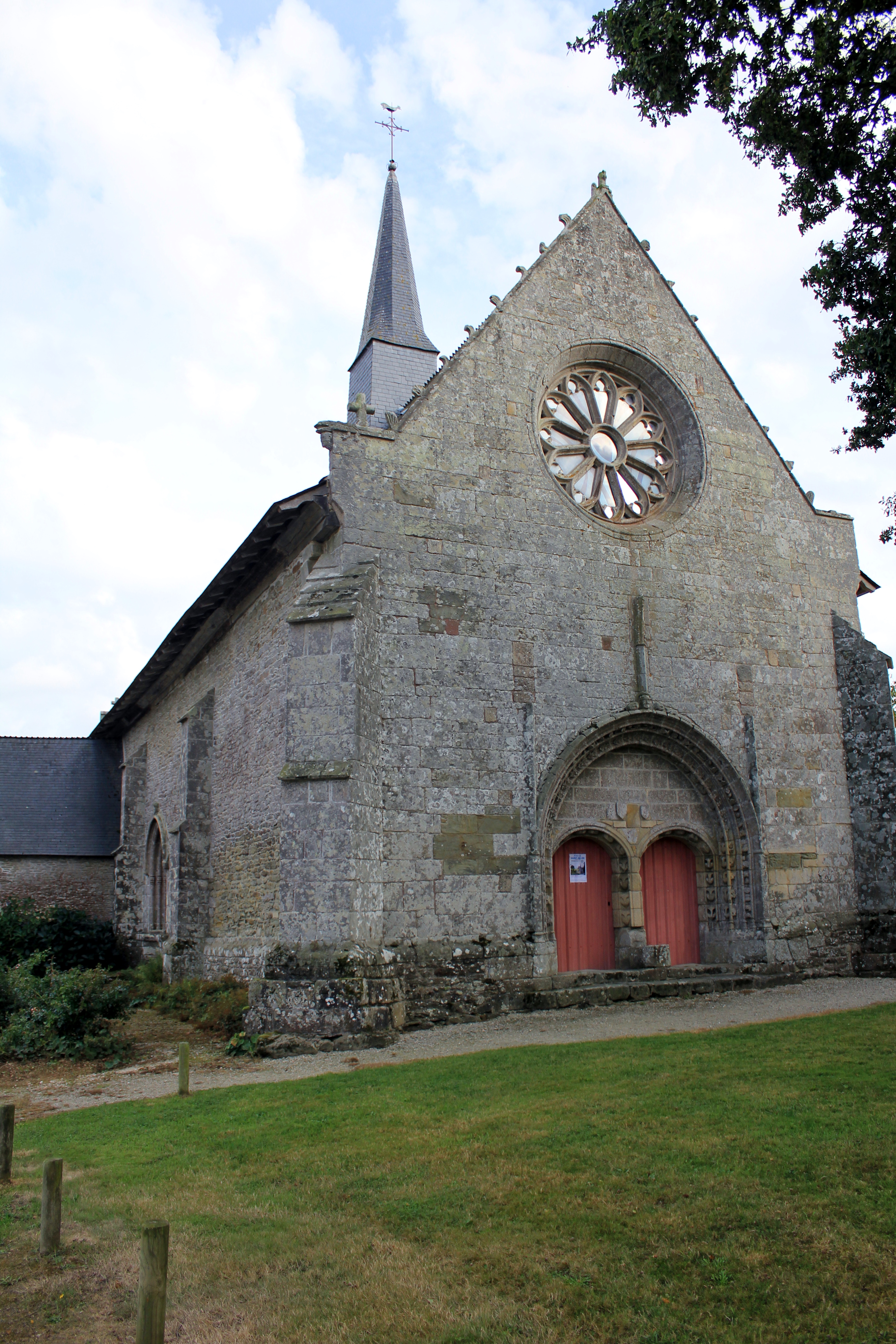
Chapelle Saint-Maudé (La Croix-Helléan)

== Butler's account ==
The hagiographer Alban Butler (1710–1773) wrote in his Lives of the Fathers, Martyrs, and Other Principal Saints, under May 18,

St. Maw, Confessor

This name in the Cornish language signifies a boy. He was a native of Ireland, and came young into Cornwall that he might live to God alone in the closest solitude, in the practice of the most austere penance and the exercises of divine prayer. His hermitage was on the sea-coast, near the spacious harbour of Falmouth. The place is still called St. Mawes, in Latin S. Mauditi Castrum, where a church, and in the church-yard a chair of solid stone and a miraculous or holy well, still bear his name. See Leland’s Itiner. vol. ix. p. 79, vol. iii. fol. 13. alias 19, where he writes that this saint had been a bishop in Britain, and was painted as a schoolmaster.

== Sources ==
- Butler, Alban (1866), The Lives of the Fathers, Martyrs, and Other Principal Saints, James Duffy This article incorporates text from this source, which is in the public domain.
- Doble, G. H. (1964), The Saints of Cornwall: part 3. Truro: Dean and Chapter
