= Entenin =

Medieval Cornish saint

Entenin, also called Antoninus and Anthony, was a medieval Brittonic saint. The name Entenin appears in a 10th-century list of Cornish saints found in the binding of a manuscript now in the Vatican Library. Two parish churches in Cornwall are dedicated to him, those of St Anthony in Roseland and St Anthony-in-Meneage. A well, known as Ventoninny, in the parish of Probus also preserves his name; it may have been a holy well historically. Entenin is unknown outside of Cornwall.

The name Entenin is a local Cornish derivation of the Latin Antoninus; derivative personal names were common in Brittonic-speaking regions after the Roman occupation of Britain. The phonetic changes by which Antoninus becomes Entenin date the name to the 5th to 8th centuries. The fact that his name was nativised indicates that his cult was not a foreign one.

Entenin's cult may have originated in the Roseland parish, where he was recorded in the 12th century as a king and martyr with a feast day on 25 December. He may later have been identified with the martyr Antoninus of Alexandria, whose feast was celebrated on 9 August, as by the mid 19th century the Roseland parish held its feast day on the Sunday nearest to 10 August.
