= Richard Spry =

English Admiral

Rear-Admiral Sir Richard Spry
- Born: 1715
- Died: 25 November 1775 (aged 59–60); Place House, Cornwall
- Military career
- Allegiance: Kingdom of Great Britain
- Branch: Royal Navy
- Rank: Rear-Admiral of the Red
- Commands: North American Station; Mediterranean Fleet; Plymouth Command
- Conflicts: War of the Austrian Succession; Seven Years' War

Rear-Admiral Sir Richard Spry (1715– 25 November 1775) was a Royal Navy officer who served as Commander-in-Chief, North American Station.

== Naval career ==
After an education at Truro Grammar School Spry joined the Royal Navy as a volunteer in 1733. Following the sinking of his ship by the Spanish Navy he was taken prisoner in 1745 but released two months later.

He took part in the siege of Pondicherry in India in 1750.

From 17 October 1753 to 5 June 1754 he was captain of the frigate HMS Garland.

In 1755 he became senior officer at Halifax, Nova Scotia, and in 1758 took part in the successful Siege of Louisbourg. He was given command of HMS Orford in 1760. In 1762 he was appointed Commander-in-Chief, North American Station. In 1766 he was promoted to the rank of Commodore and appointed Commander-in-Chief, Mediterranean Station.

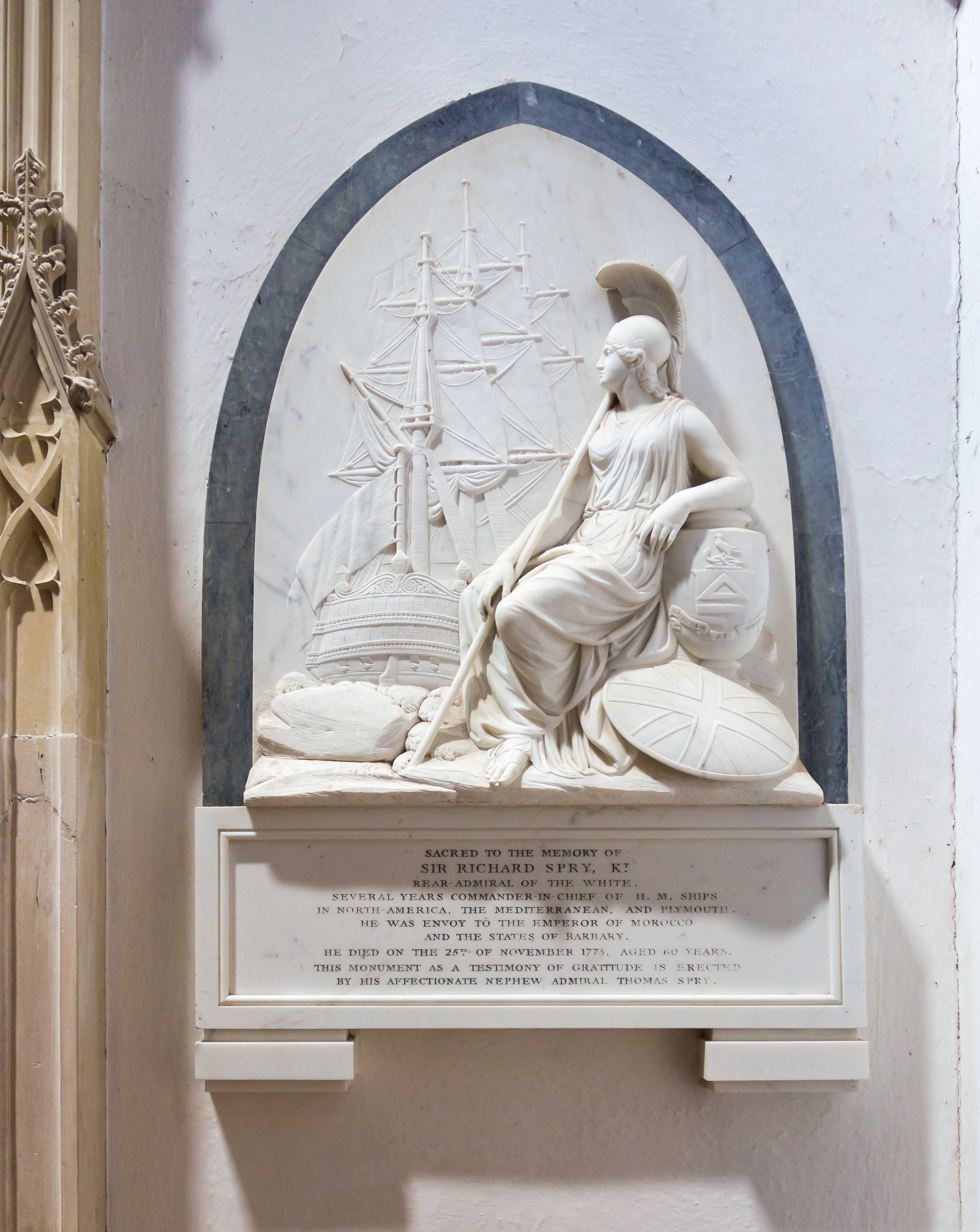
Memorial in St Anthony's church, St Anthony in Roseland

Spry returned to England in 1769. In 1770 he was promoted to rear admiral and went on to be Port Admiral at Plymouth in 1771.

Spry was knighted at Portsmouth on 24 June 1773 and retired to the Spry family seat at Place House in St Anthony in Roseland, Cornwall. He died there in 1775. His memorial in St Anthony's Church there is by Humphrey Hopper.

Military offices
Preceded by Sir George Edgcumbe	Commander-in-Chief, Plymouth; 1771–1775	Succeeded by John Amherst
