= William Spry (British Army officer) =

British Army general

Lieutenant-General William Spry (1734–1802) was born in Titchfield, Hampshire, in 1734, the son of George Spry and Elizabeth Short.

== Military career ==
He joined the Royal Engineers and gradually rose through the ranks. During the French and Indian War, Spry participated in the Siege of Louisbourg and served in Quebec after its surrender the following year.

During the American Revolution, Spry was the commander of the Royal Engineers and in Halifax, Nova Scotia, strengthened Citadel Hill, built Fort Massey and Fort Needham, and oversaw the building of the Northwest Arm Battery at Point Pleasant.

In 1783 he was made a colonel in the Royal Engineers, rising to the rank of major-general (1793) and later lieutenant-general (1799).

== Land speculator ==
In about 1770, while a captain, William Spry purchased some land in Nova Scotia and established the settlement known as Spryfield with the aid of stationed soldiers from the nearby Halifax garrison. He sold his property at the end of the American Revolution (1783) and returned to England.

== Family ==
Spry died in 1802 and is supposedly buried under the clock tower of St Margaret's, Westminster.

William was descended from the Spry family of Roseland, Cornwall, which bred many army and navy officers. His brother was Lieutenant-General Horatio Spry (1730–1811) and his son was Major-General William Frederick Spry (1770–1814).
