= St Just's Church, St Just in Roseland =

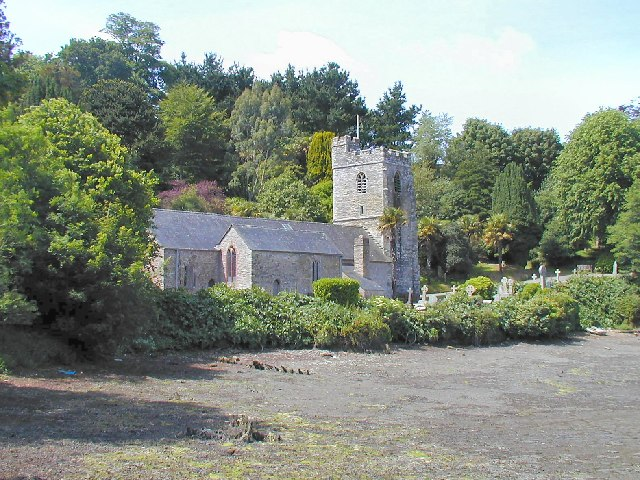
- St Just's Church, St Just in Roseland
- St Just's Church, St Just in Roseland
- 50°10′55.74″N 5°00′56.47″W
- Location: St Just in Roseland
- Country: England
- Denomination: Church of England

History
- Dedication: St Justinian of Ramsey Island
- Consecrated: 1216

Administration
- Province: Province of Canterbury
- Diocese: Diocese of Truro
- Archdeaconry: Cornwall
- Deanery: Powder
- Parish: St Just in Roseland
- Location within Cornwall

Listed Building – Grade I
- Official name: Church of Saint Just
- Designated: 30 May 1967
- Reference no.: 1141006

St Just's Church, St Just in Roseland, is a Grade I listed parish church in the Church of England Diocese of Truro in St Just in Roseland, Cornwall, England, UK.

== History ==
The church is considered to have been founded around 550 AD in honour of St Just the Martyr. For the first 400 years, it was served by the Celtic clergy from the adjacent cell of Lanzeague. Around 950 AD it was taken from the Celtic Church by the Bishops of Cornwall, Crediton and Exeter. In 1140, the church was given by Robert Warelwast, Bishop of Exeter to the Canons of Plympton Priory, and served by their vicars. In 1189 the patronage was recovered from the Priory by John le Sor, Lord of Tolverne, and from that date the incumbents have been Rectors.

The current church building dates from the 13th century. It was consecrated in 1216 by Simon of Apulia, Bishop of Exeter.

It was restored in 1872 and re-opened by the Bishop on Monday 18 November 1872 who arrived at the church on HMS Ganges, the guest of Captain Tinklar. New pews and the pulpit and reredos were provided. A new stone arch opening into the north transept was provided, and the floor was paved with Minton and Hollins encaustic tiles. The altar rails were removed and the altar placed on a level reached by two granite steps. The seating and other woodwork was executed by Messrs Borlase of St Just, and the mason's work was done by Messrs Clemens of Truro.

The vestry was added in the 20th century.

== Parish status ==
The church is in a joint parish with

- St Mawes' Church, St Mawes

== Organ ==
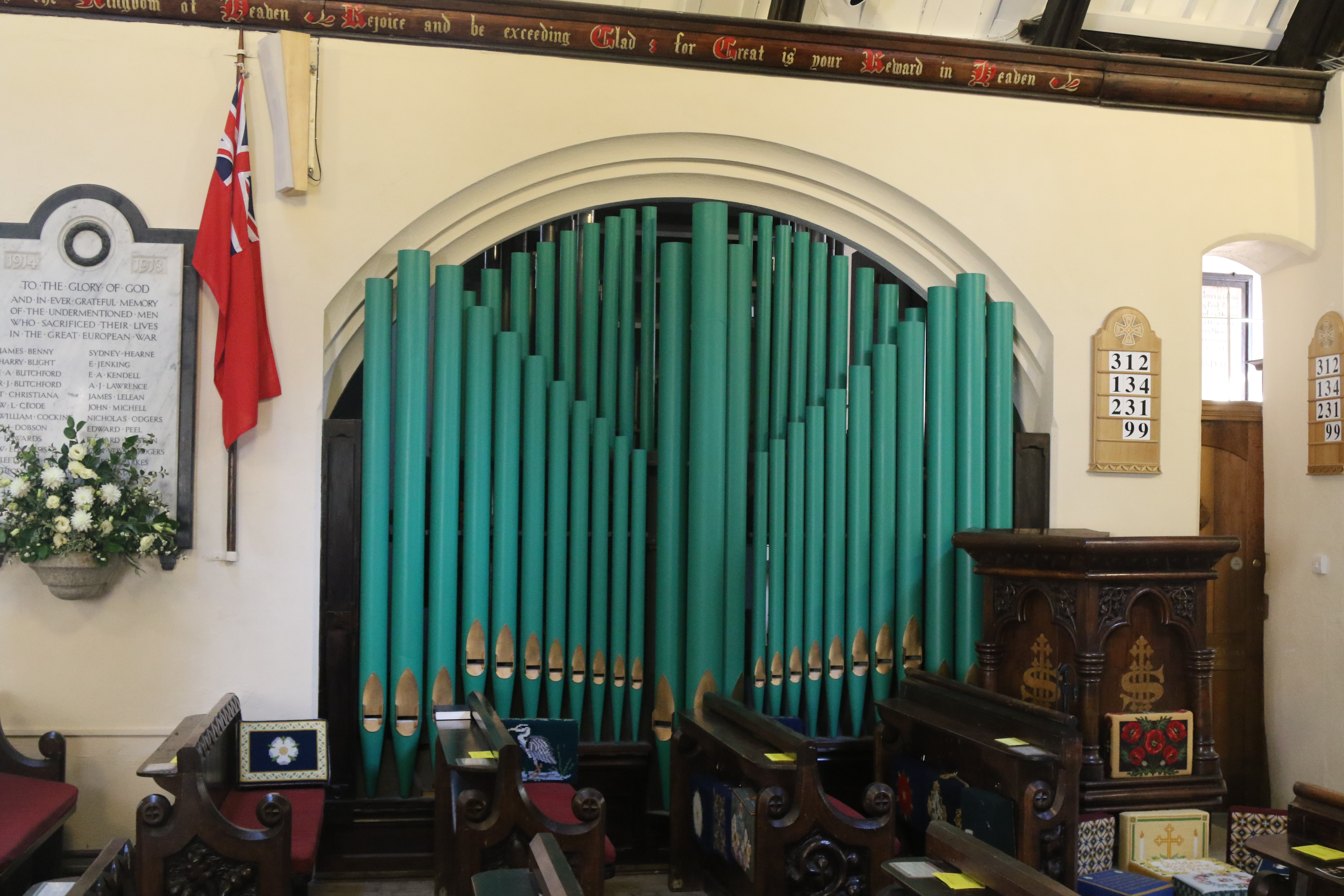
The organ

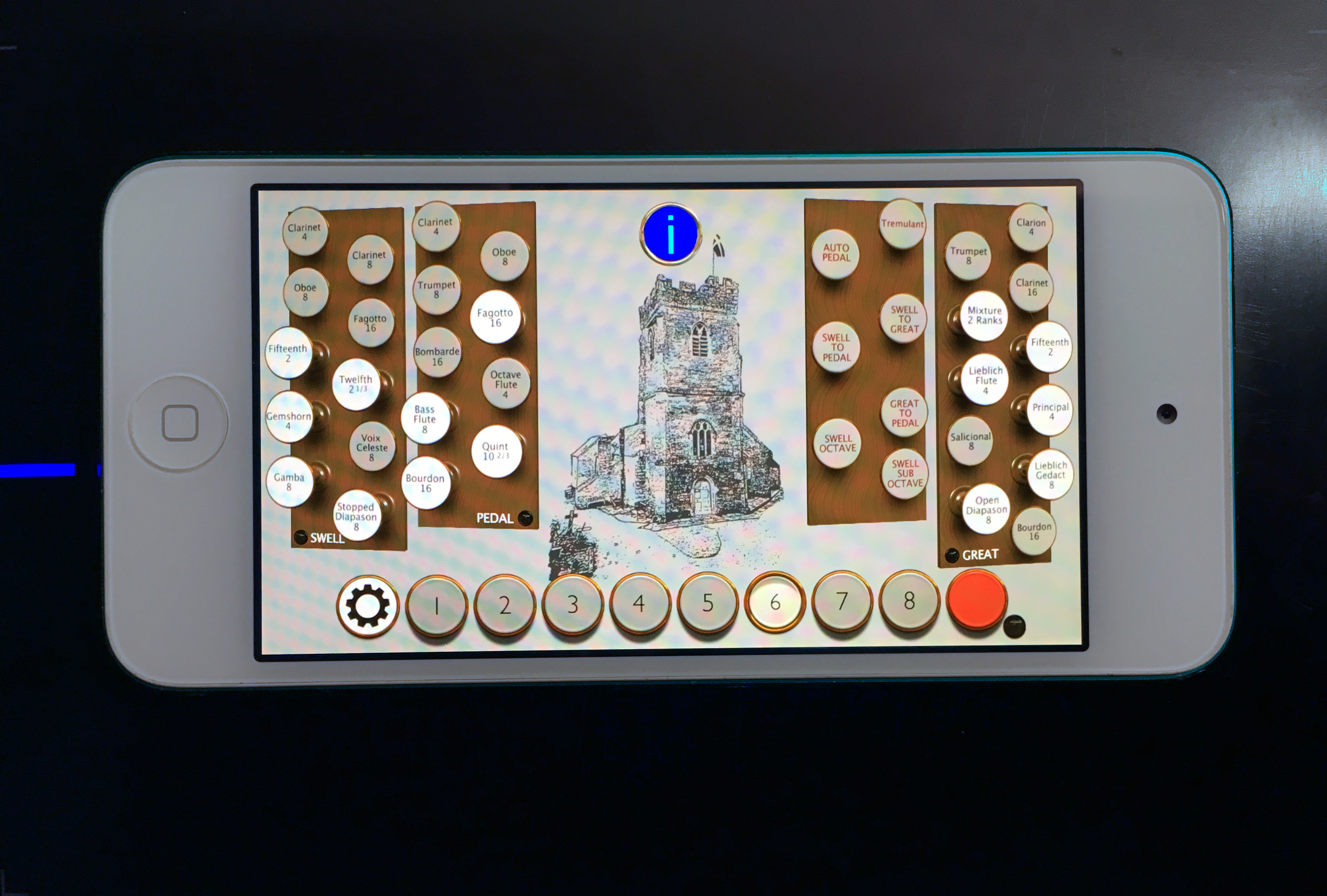
Virtual St Just in Roseland Organ running on iPod Touch 5G

The organ was originally in St John the Evangelist's Church, Treslothan. It was moved here in 1966 by Hele & Co and has subsequently been modified by Lance Foy. A specification of the organ can be found on the National Pipe Organ Register.

== Virtual Pipe Organ App ==
In 2018 the organ was made available as a 'Virtual Pipe Organ' on iPhone and iPad, with 50% of the revenues from the app donated to the parish organ fund.

== Rectors of St Just in Roseland ==
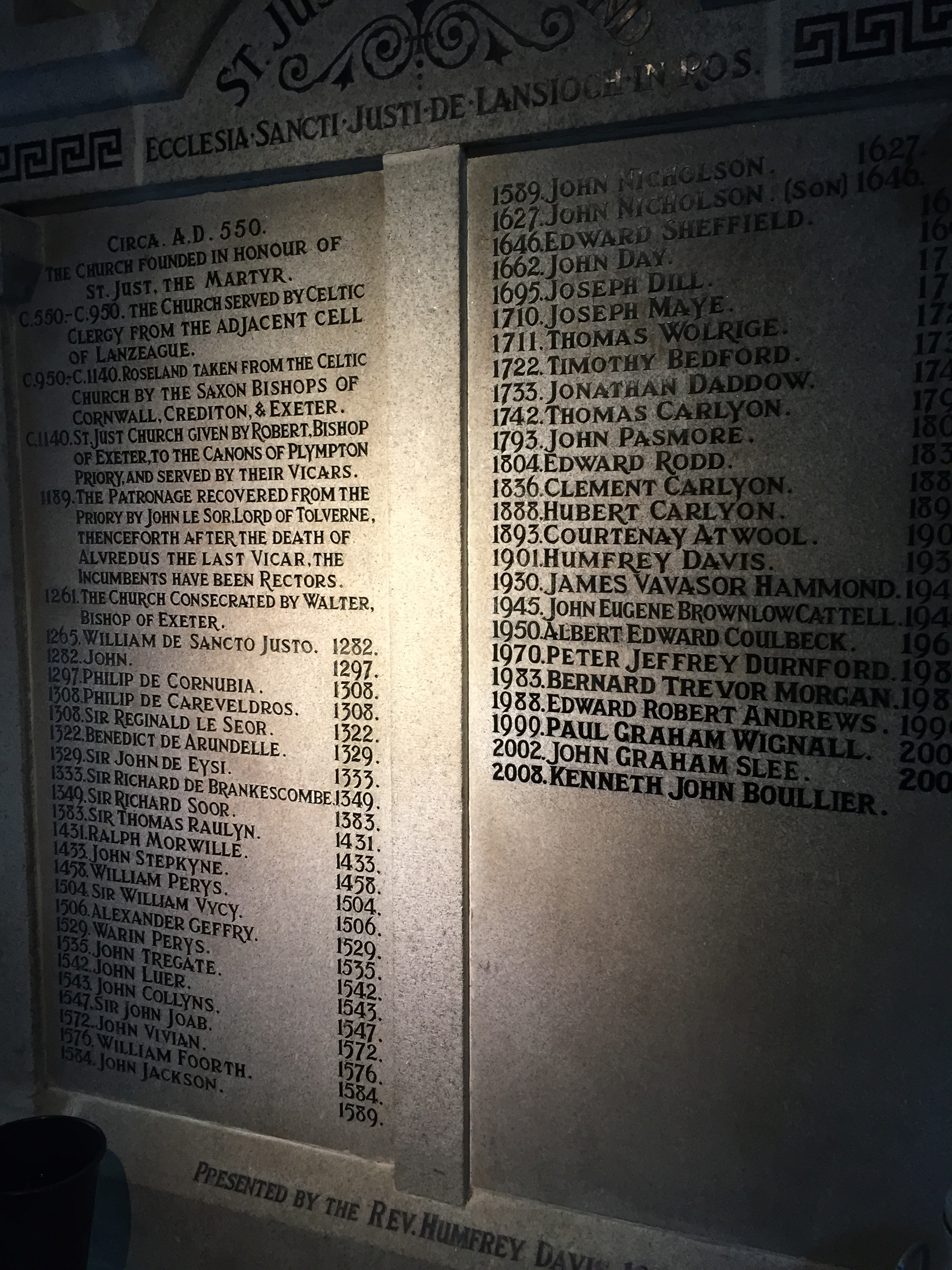
List of rectors

- William de Sancto Justo 1265 - 1282
- John 1282 - 1297
- Philip de Cornubia 1297 - 1308
- Philip de Careveldross 1308
- Sir Reginald le Seor 1308 - 1322
- Benedict de Arundelle 1322 - 1329
- Sir John de Eysi 1329 - 1333
- Sir Richard de Barnkescombe 1333 - 1349
- Sir Richard Soor 1349 - 1383
- Sir Thomas Raulyn 1383 - 1431
- Ralph Morwille 1431 - 1433
- John Stepkyne 1433 - 1458
- William Perys 1458 - 1504
- Sir William Vycy 1504 - 1506
- Alexander Geffry 1506 - 1529
- Warin Perys 1529 - 1535
- John Tregate 1535 - 1542
- John Luer 1542 - 1543
- John Collyns 1543 - 1547
- Sir John Joan 1547 - 1572
- John Vivian 1572 - 1576
- William Foorth 1576 - 1584
- John Jackson 1584 - 1589
- John Nicholson 1589 - 1627
- John Nicholson (son) 1627 - 1646
- Edward Sheffield 1646
- John Day 1662 - 1695
- Joseph Dill 1696 - 1710
- Joseph Maye 1710 - 1711
- Thomas Wolrige 1711 - 1722
- Thomas Bedford 1722 - 1733
- Jonathan Daddow 1733 - 1742
- Thomas Carlyon 1742 - 1793
- John Pasmore 1793 - 1804

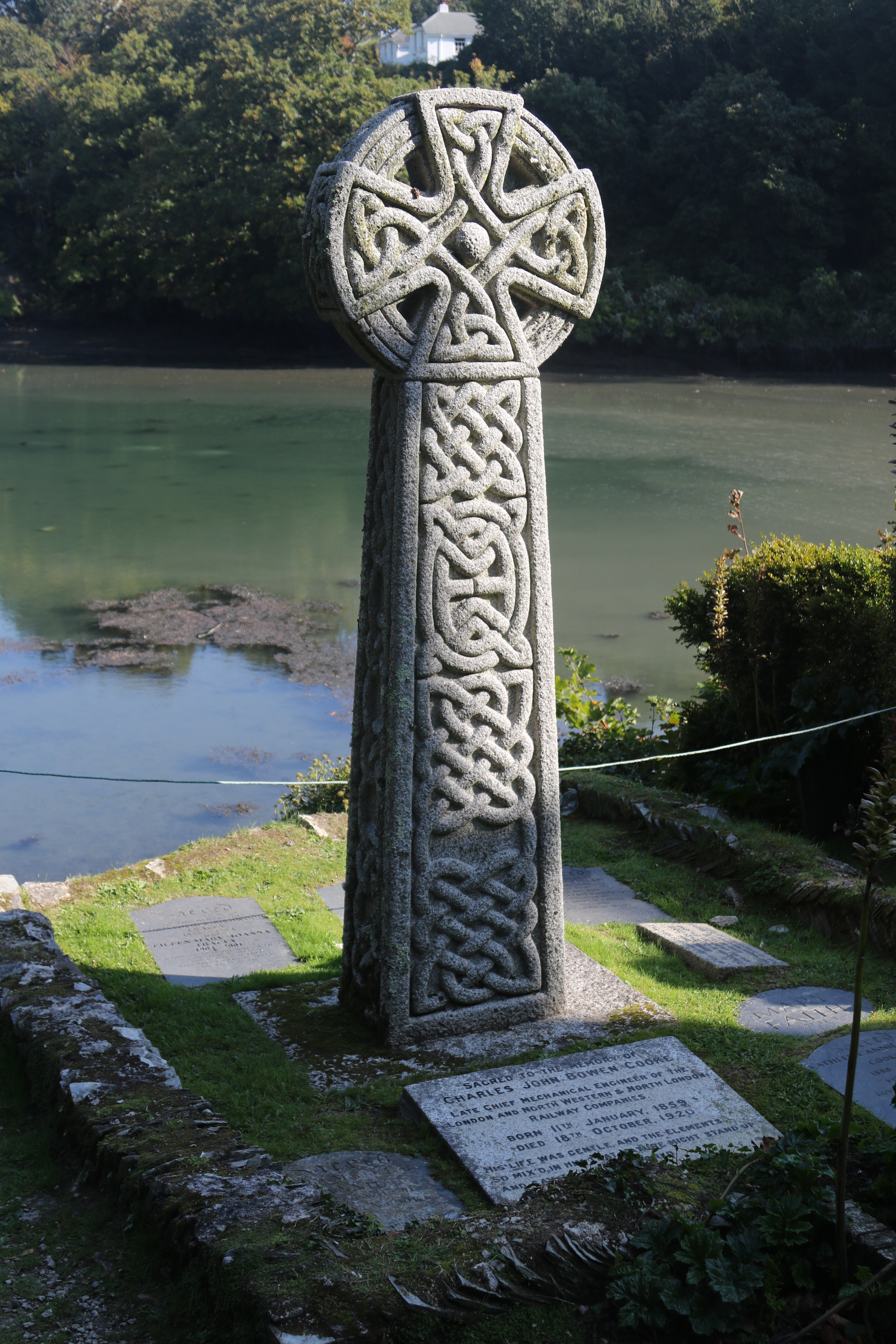
The grave of Charles Bowen Cooke

- Edward Rodd 1804 - 1836
- Clement Carlyon 1836 - 1888
- Hubert Carlyon 1888 - 1893
- Courtenay Atwool 1893 - 1901
- Humfrey Davis 1901 - 1930
- James Vavasor Hammond 1930 - 1945
- John Eugene Brownlow Cattell 1945 - 1950
- Albert Edward Coulbeck 1950 - 1970
- Peter Jeffrey Durnford 1970 - 1983
- Bernard Trevor Morgan 1983 - 1988
- Edward Robert Andrews 1988 - 1999
- Paul Graham Wignall 1999 - 2002
- John Graham Slee 2002 - 2008
- Kenneth John Boullier 2008 - 2018

== Notable people ==
The grave of Charles Bowen Cooke (illustrated above right), a notable locomotive engineer, is in the churchyard.
