= Roseland Peninsula =

Peninsula in Cornwall, England

Coordinates: 50°10′N 5°00′W

The Roseland peninsula shown within Cornwall

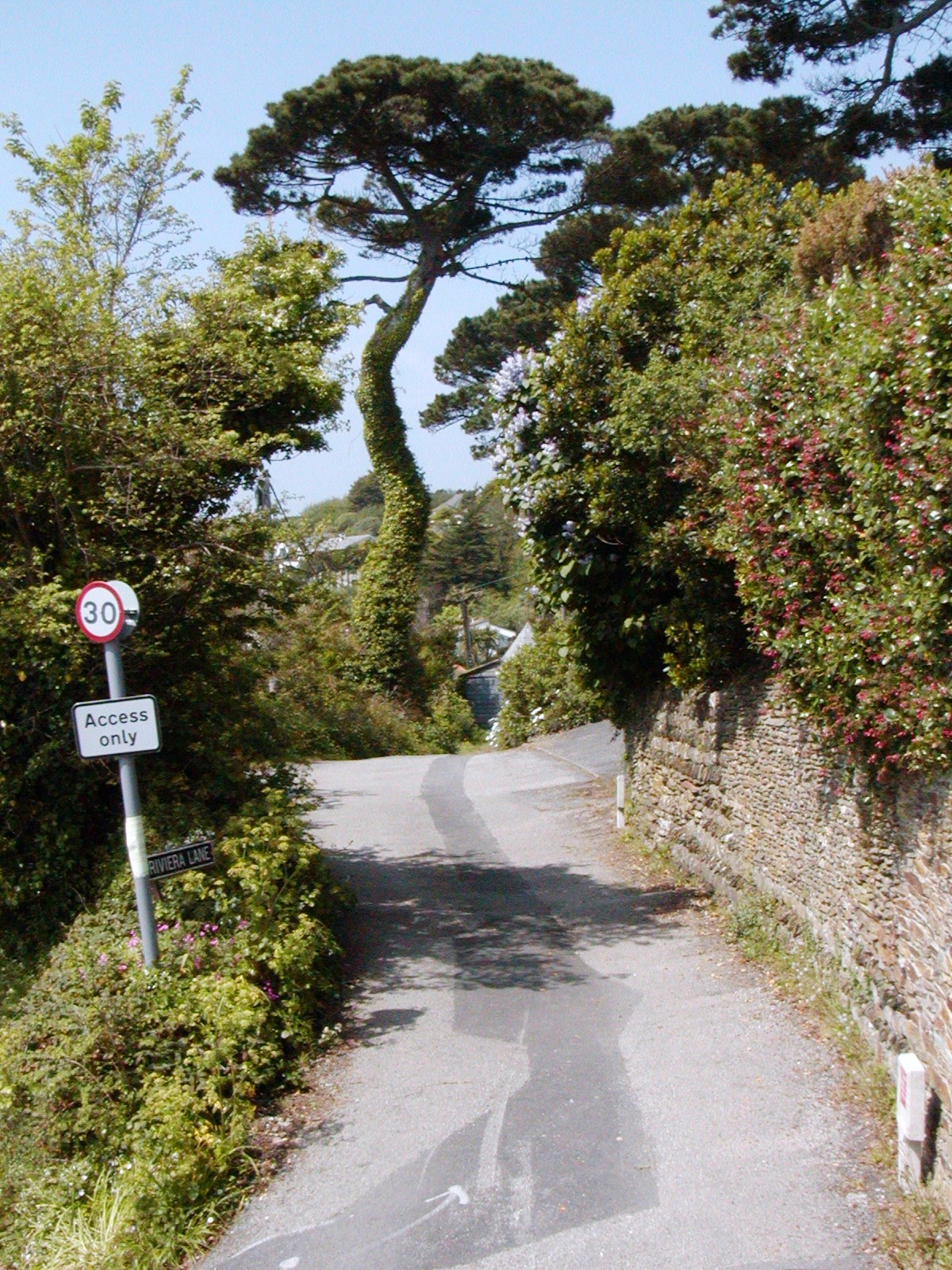
Riviera Lane, St Mawes (May 2004)

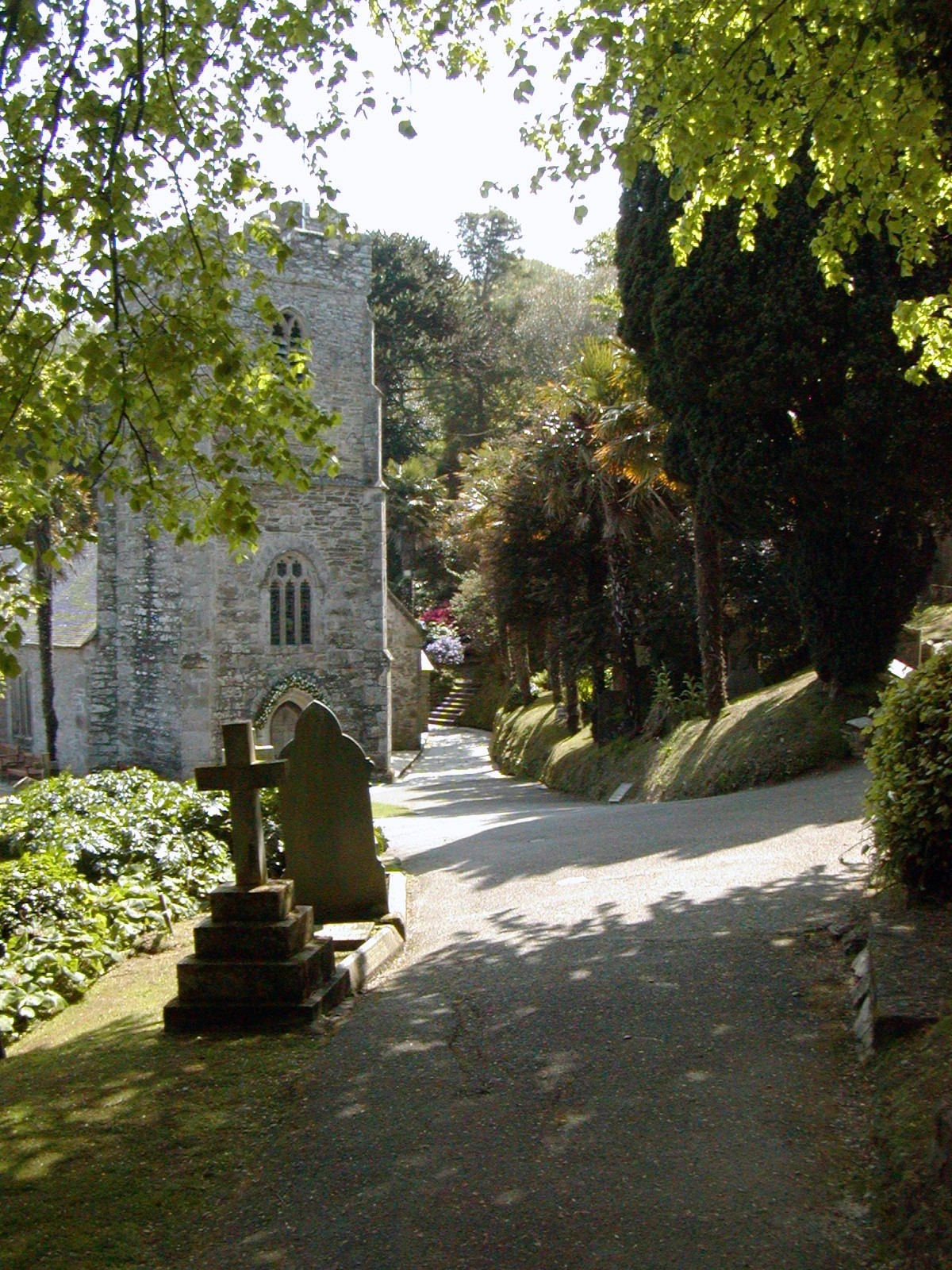
Churchyard of St Just

The Roseland Peninsula, or just Roseland, (Cornish: An Ros, meaning the promontory) is a district of west Cornwall, England. Roseland is located in the south of the county and contains the town of St Mawes and villages such as St Just and Gerrans. It is a peninsula, separated from the remainder of Cornwall by the River Fal (on the east is the English Channel).

Where the peninsula begins continues to be a point of discussion amongst local historians and long-time Roseland inhabitants. The village of Tregony might be considered to be outside the Roseland. If travelling by road one enters the Roseland at the bottom of Tregony Hill by either driving up Reskivers Hill to take the road to St. Mawes and Gerrans, or by taking the lower road to Ruan Lanihorne. The Roseland Plan, a neighbourhood plan produced in 2015, defined Roseland as the areas of the civil parishes of St-Just-in-Roseland (which includes St Mawes), Gerrans, Philleigh, Ruanlanihorne and Veryan.

Until 2021 there was a Roseland electoral division of Cornwall Council which also covered St Mawes, the population of which at the 2011 census was 3,375.

== History and geography ==
John Norden

In 1584 map maker John Norden wrote, 'The peninsula is called by the pretty name of Roseland, being derived from Rhos, the Celtic word for heath or gorse.' He goes on to say that, "Roseland is a circuit of land lying between the creek of Falmouth haven and the sea."

John Whitaker

Lake's Parochial History of the County of Cornwall (1870) includes Revd John Whitaker’s discussion of the Roseland when dealing with Philleigh parish. He notes that the villages of Veryan and Ruanlanihorne each has its church in a valley, the area which would have been inhabited first as the valleys were more sheltered and benefited from soil washed down from the hillsides. At the top of the hills lay an extensive heath (or rhos/rôs).

Whitaker believed that the area was first named 'Roseland' when the English came to settle in 936. The parish of Philleigh was carved out of the parish of Ruanlanihorne and was originally called Eglos-rôs. Two fields were tithable in common between Ruanlanihorne and Philleigh (Higher and Lower Congier) which he claims proves the two parishes were once one. According to Hals (in Lake's Parochial History) St Just in Roseland was rated under the jurisdiction of Eglos-rôs (Philleigh) in the Domesday Book.

From this it seems reasonable to assume that the first people to use the term ‘Roseland’ understood it to cover the parishes which contained the ‘rhos/rôs ’, so the parishes of Veryan, Ruanlanihorne and Philleigh have a good claim to be part of the Roseland.

So it seems to make sense to regard the Roseland as starting at Daddiport Bridge at the foot of Reskivers Hill. The stream which comes down the hillside to Daddiport Bridge is the boundary between Veryan and Tregony parishes, thus continuing the water boundary of the peninsula. That is the way locals now see the Roseland Peninsula.

20th century writers

In The Roseland: between River and Sea, Laurence O'Toole described it rather differently, including the parishes of Gerrans, St Anthony in Roseland, St Just, and St Mawes and so only taking the parishes that protrude on that thin arm of the land.

Place House at St Anthony was the seat of the Spry family for several hundred years. It has been enviously described by Joe Bennett in his travel book Mustn't Grumble, 2006.

Murder of Lyn Bryant

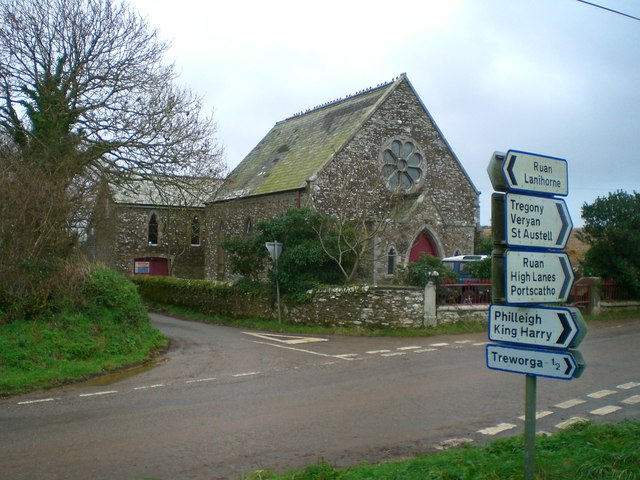
Ruan Methodist Church near Ruan High Lanes, 100 yards (91 meters) from where Lyn Bryant was found murdered on 20 October 1998. Only minutes before she was murdered, a passing motorist saw her speaking to an unidentified man at this spot. This was the last sighting of her alive.

In a highly publicised case, a 41-year-old local woman named Lyn Bryant was murdered while out walking her dog on the peninsula near Ruan High Lanes on 20 October 1998. The murder featured heavily in the press, media and on Crimewatch, but her attacker has never been identified and the murder remains one of the highest profile unsolved murders in the UK. At the time, police believed that her random and apparently motiveless killing might be linked to the murder of 14-year-old Kate Bushell in another rural lane in Exeter one year previously. Both had been randomly killed with knives while out walking their dogs down isolated lanes in the south west.

An unknown man had been seen talking to Bryant by Ruan Methodist Church that afternoon, only minutes before she was murdered only 100 yards (91 meters) away. Earlier in the day a different man with a full beard in a small white van (who was apparently not local) had also been seen following her in her car. In 2018, a DNA profile of Bryant's attacker was identified. The investigation into her death is one of the largest ever conducted by Devon and Cornwall Police and had cost nearly £2 million by 2018. There remains a £10,000 reward for information leading to the capture of her killer.

== Film and television ==
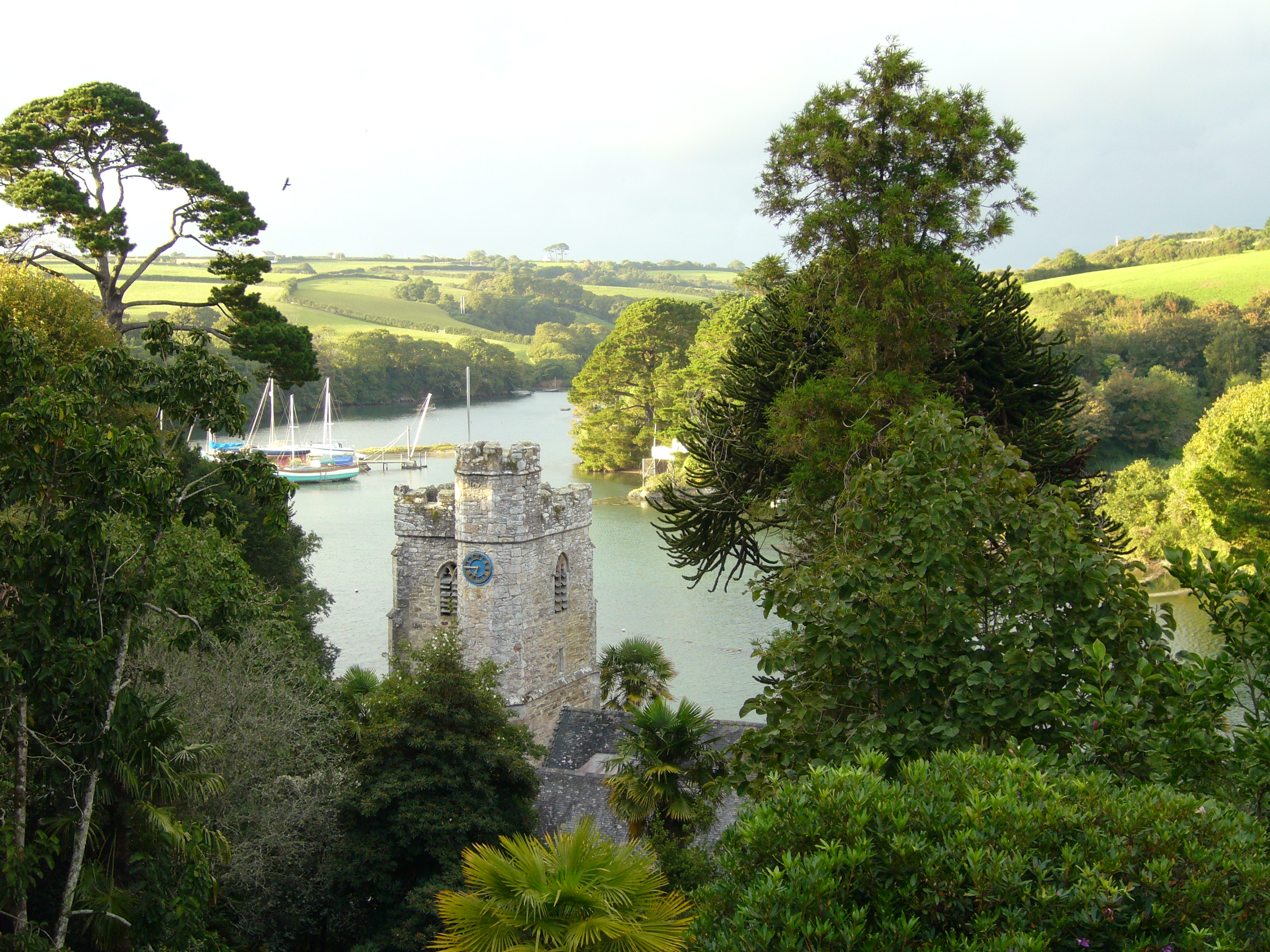
View from above the church looking across to St Just Creek

Channel 4's 1992 series The Camomile Lawn, adapted from Mary Wesley's novel, was shot at the National Trust property Broom Parc on the Roseland Peninsula. The series starred Felicity Kendal, Paul Eddington, Claire Bloom, Jennifer Ehle & Rebecca Hall and was directed by Sir Peter Hall.

The 2009 film documentary And Did Those Feet suggests that Jesus Christ may have visited the Roseland Peninsula. The legend of Christ's visit to England is depicted in William Blake's poem "And did those feet in ancient time".
