= Lanmodez =

Lanmodez Lanvaodez
- Commune
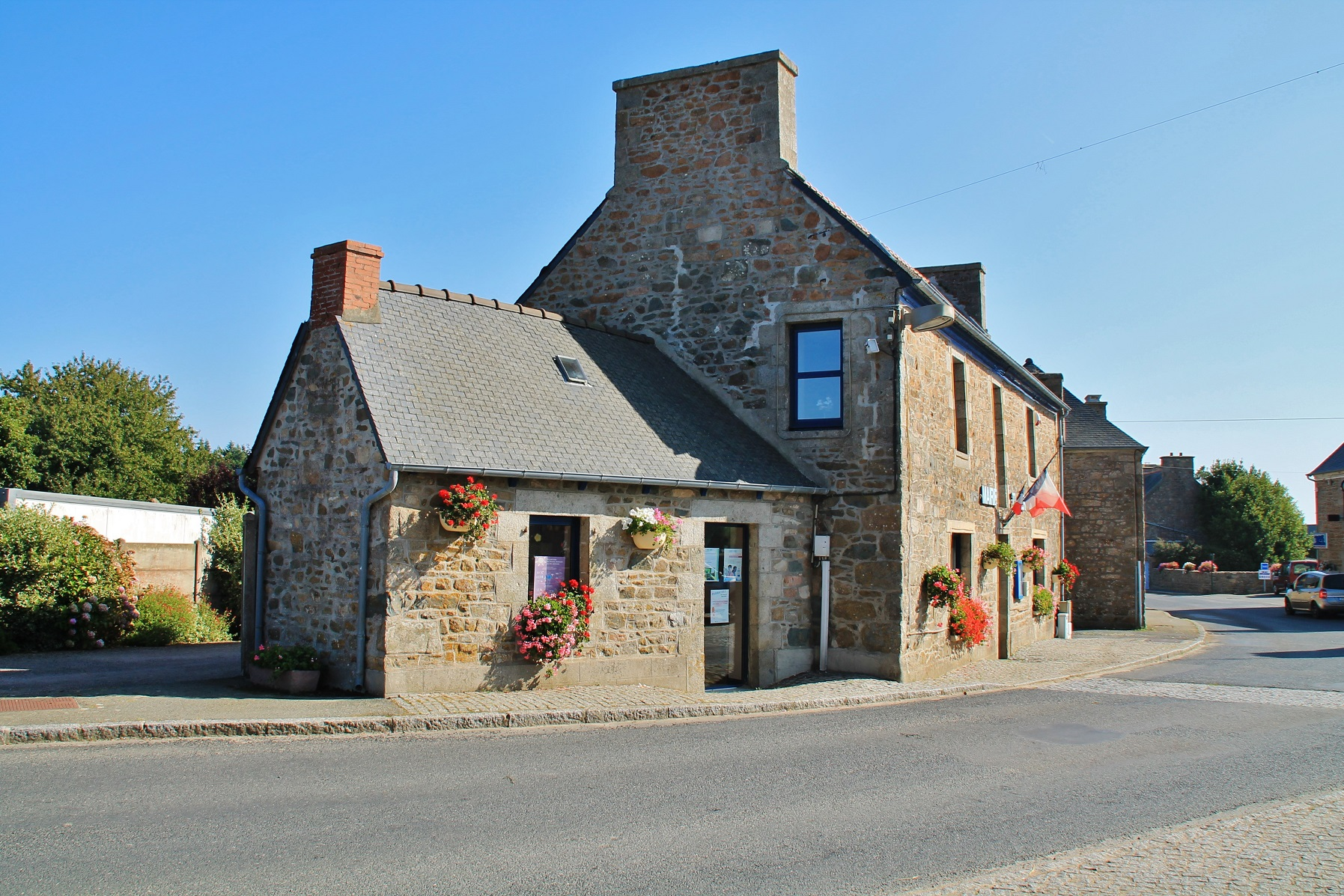
- The town hall of Lanmodez
- Location of Lanmodez
- Location within France Location within Brittany
- Coordinates: 48°50′31″N 3°06′16″W
- Country: France
- Region: Brittany
- Department: Côtes-d'Armor
- Arrondissement: Lannion
- Canton: Tréguier
- Intercommunality: Lannion-Trégor Communauté

Government
  - Mayor (2020–2026): Lydie Domancich
- Area^{1}: 4.15 km^{2} (1.60 sq mi)
- Highest elevation: 53 m (174 ft)
- Lowest elevation: 0 m (0 ft)
- Population (2023): 394
  - Density: 94.9/km^{2} (246/sq mi)
- Time zone: UTC+01:00 (CET)
  - Summer (DST): UTC+02:00 (CEST)
- INSEE/Postal code: 22111 /22610
- ^{1} French Land Register data, which excludes lakes, ponds, glaciers > 1 km^{2} (0.386 sq mi or 247 acres) and river estuaries.

Lanmodez (French pronunciation: [lɑ̃mɔde]; Breton: Lanvaodez) is a commune in the Côtes-d'Armor department of Brittany in northwestern France.

== Population ==
Historical population
Year	Pop.	±% p.a.
1968	418	—
1975	394	−0.84%
1982	392	−0.07%
1990	392	+0.00%
1999	431	+1.06%
2007	432	+0.03%
2012	457	+1.13%
2017	417	−1.82%
2023	394	−0.94%
Source: INSEE

Inhabitants of Lanmodez are called lanmodéziens in French.

== See also ==
- Communes of the Côtes-d'Armor department
