= St Just in Roseland =

Village and civil parish in Cornwall, England

Coordinates: 50°10′56.36″N 5°00′53.99″W

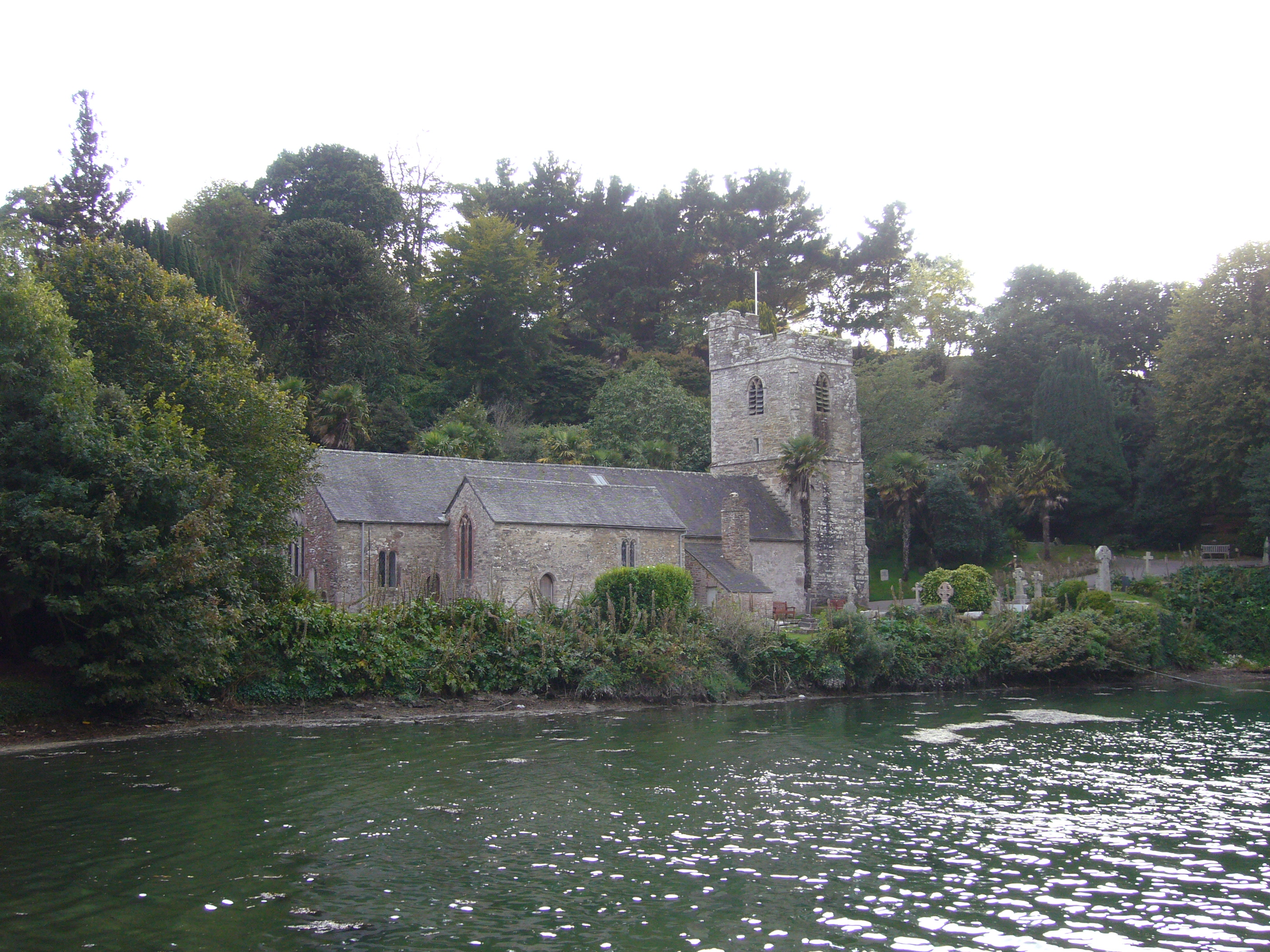
- St Just parish church

- Location within Cornwall
- Population: 1,158 (2011 census)
- Civil parish: St Just in Roseland
- Unitary authority: Cornwall
- Shire county: Cornwall
- Region: South West
- Country: England
- Sovereign state: United Kingdom
- Police: Devon and Cornwall
- Fire: Cornwall
- Ambulance: South Western

St Just in Roseland (Cornish: Lannsiek) is a village and civil parish in Cornwall, England, United Kingdom. The village is 6 miles (10 km) south of Truro and 2 miles (3 km) north of St Mawes, a small village within the parish of St Just in Roseland. The 2011 Census recorded the parish population as 1,158.

St Just in Roseland lies within the Cornwall National Landscape (AONB).

== Churches ==
St Just in Roseland is noted for its 13th-century Church of England parish church, St Just’s Church, St Just in Roseland, set in riverside gardens planted with semitropical shrubs and trees, many of which are species rare in England. The church is on the edge of a tidal creek beside the Carrick Roads on the Fal Estuary just outside the main village. The path from the road to the church is lined with granite blocks carved with quotations and verses taken from the Bible.

== Notable people ==
- Edward Hearle Rodd (1810–1880), ornithologist, interested in the question of migration.
- Peter Wilfred James (1930 - 2014), botanist and lichenologist.
- Michael Harris (1944–2025), cricketer (known as "Pasty" Harris), played 344 First-class cricket matches.

== Gallery ==
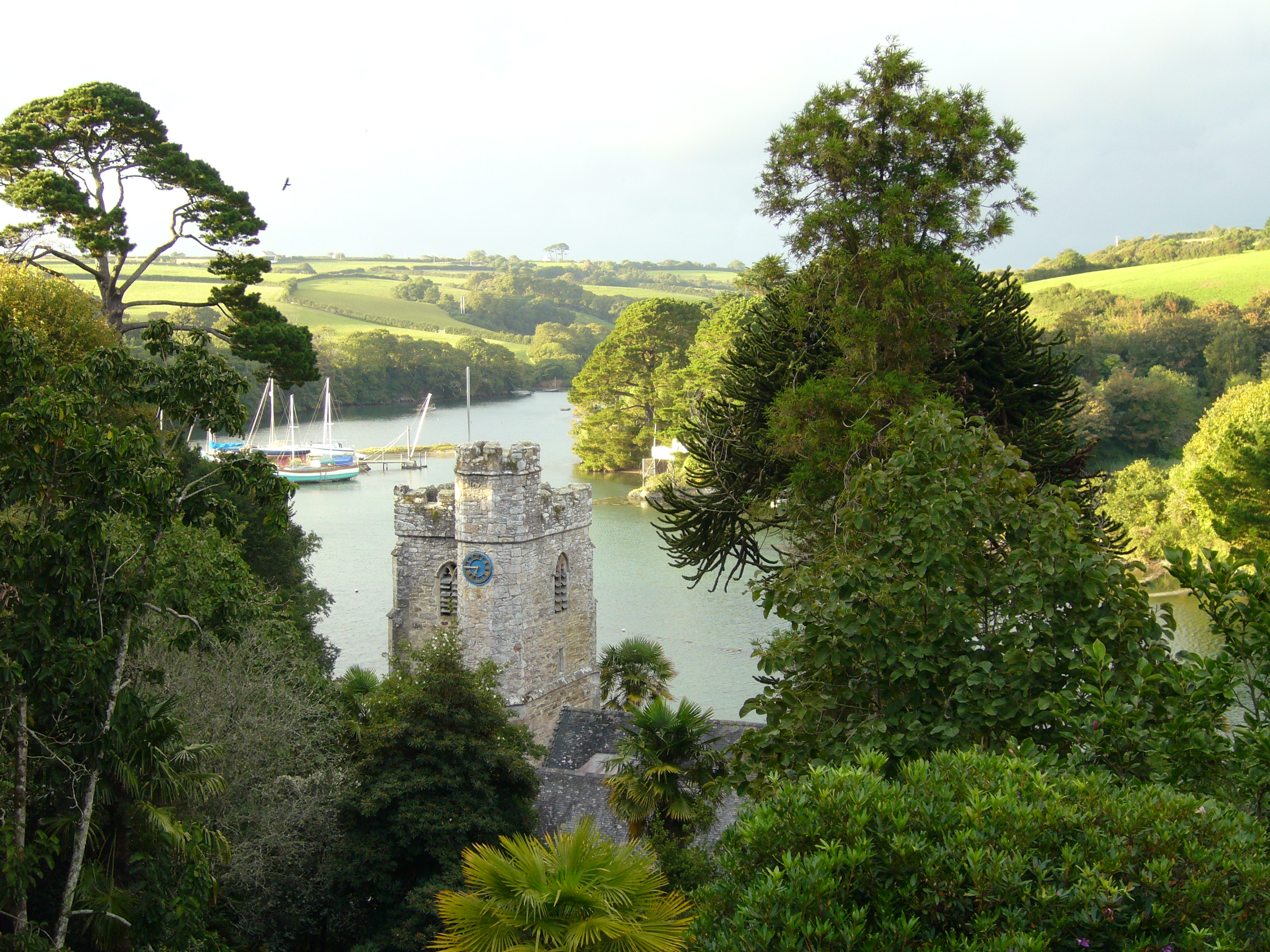
View from above the church looking across to St Just Creek

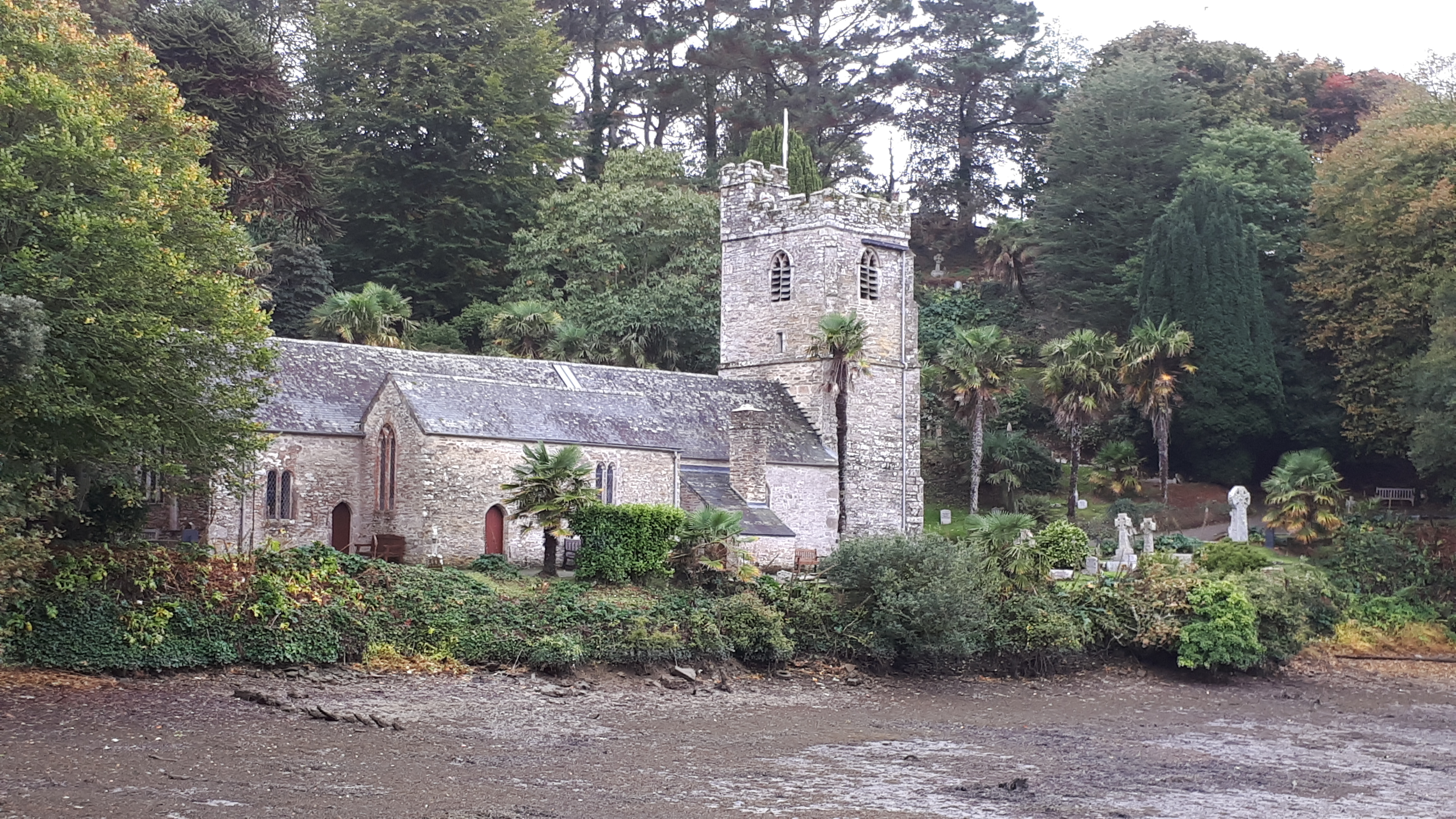
View from creek (low tide)

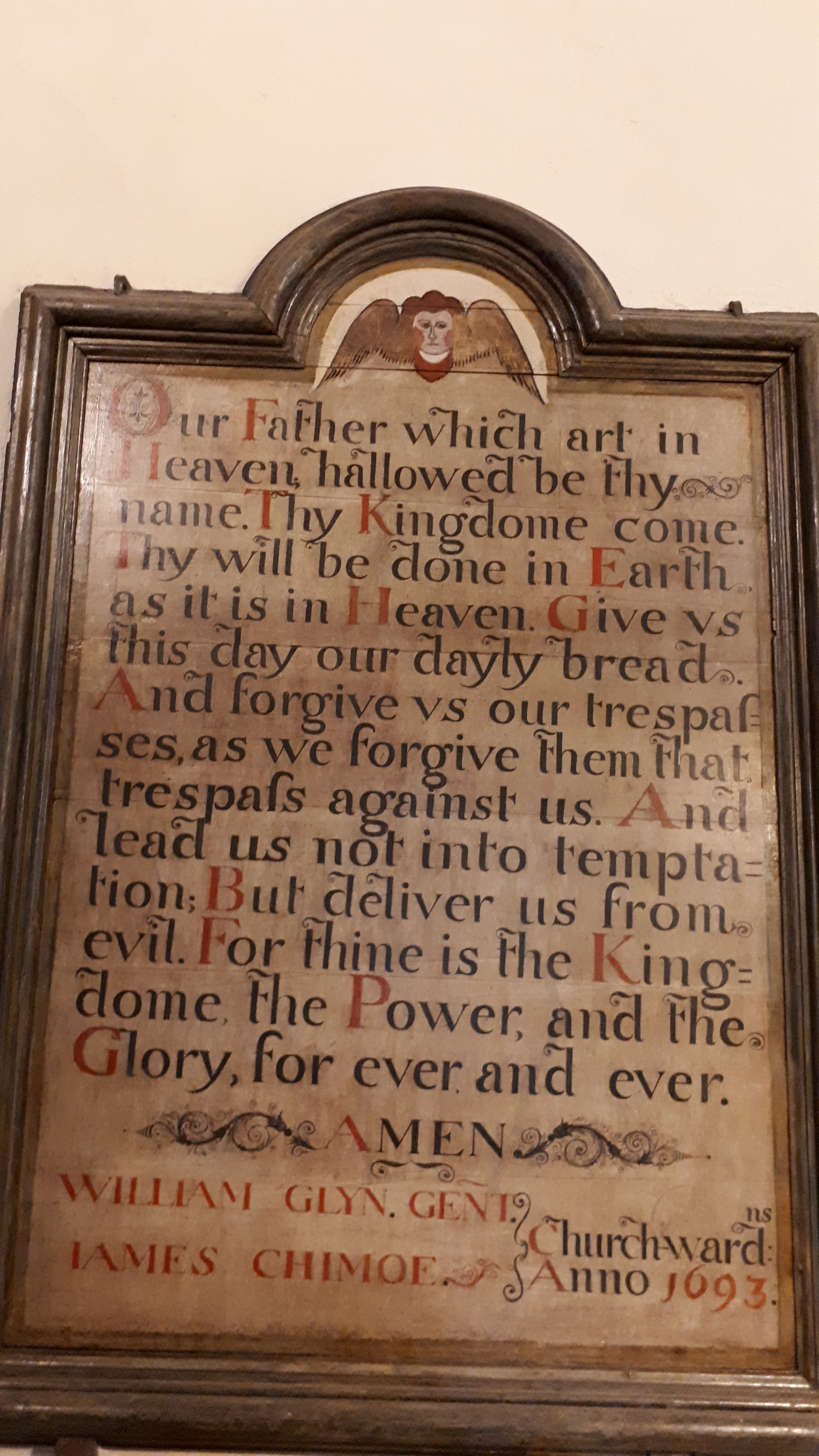
Lord's Prayer (1693)

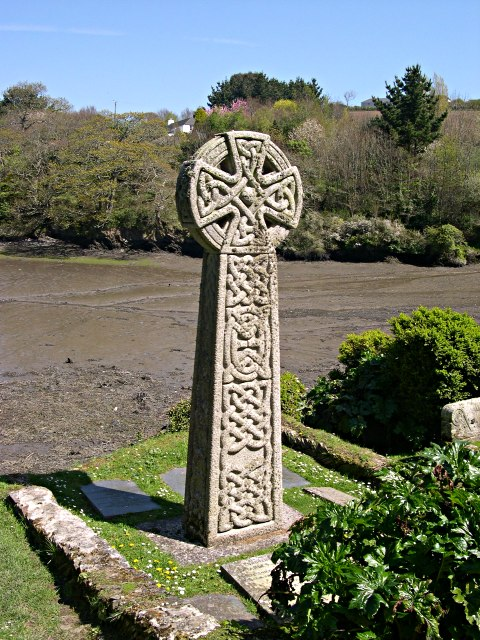
Celtic cross
