= Spry (family) =

English family

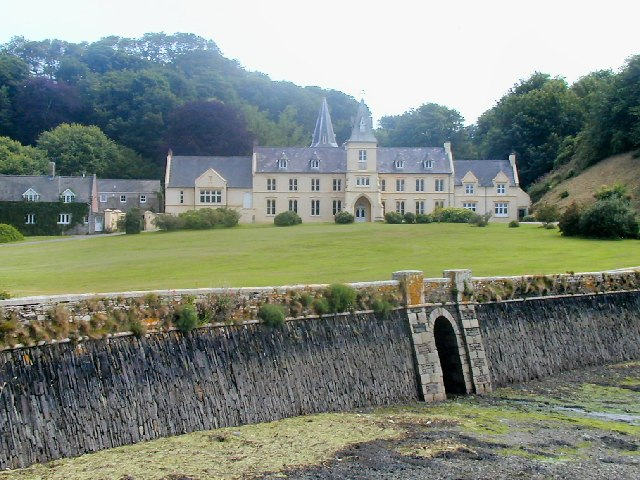
Place House

The Spry family have resided for many centuries at Place House in the Cornish parish of St Anthony in Roseland. There are a number of memorials in the parish church of St Anthony's. The Spry family settled in Cornwall in the early 16th century. With a long distinguished history of military service and of agricultural land ownership members of the Spry family are particularly numerous in Cornwall and Devon in the United Kingdom.

== Notable members ==
- Sir Henry Spry (died 1627)
- Arthur Spry (1612–1685), MP for St Mawes
- William Spry (born ca. 1663), barrister of Middle Temple
- Sir Richard Spry (1715–1775), Rear Admiral of the Red, as Rear-Admiral of the White conferred knighthood, 24 June 1773 on board HMS Barfleur by King George III Promoted Rear Admiral of the Red on 31 March 1775
- Thomas Spry, Admiral (died 1828) né Thomas Davy, Esq; Captain in the Royal Navy, and nephew of Sir Richard takes surname and arms of Spry 13 April 1779
- Sir Samuel Thomas Spry (1804–1868), MP for Bodmin, High Sheriff of Cornwall, 1849

Also descended from the Spry family of Cornwall are:

- Lieutenant-General Horatio Spry (1730–1811), whose daughter Rebecca married Rear Admiral Jonathan Faulknor of the Faulknor family of naval officers
- Lieutenant-General William Spry (1734–1802)
- Major-General William Frederick Spry (1770–1814)
- William Henry Sleeman, on his mother's side (1788–1856)
- William Spry (11 January 1864 – 21 April 1929) was an American politician who was the third Governor of Utah. He is the namesake of the William Spry Agriculture Building that houses the Utah Department of Agriculture and Food.
- Brigadier Sir Charles Chambers Fowell Spry CBE, DSO (26 June 1910 – 28 May 1994) was an Australian soldier and public servant. From 1950 to 1970 he was the second Director-General of Security, the head of the Australian Security Intelligence Organisation (ASIO).
- Daniel Spry Major General Daniel Charles Spry CBE DSO CD (4 February 1913 – 2 April 1989) was a senior Canadian Army officer who commanded the 3rd Canadian Infantry Division during Operation Veritable in World War II.[1]
- Garry Spry (born 9 May 1939) is a former Australian politician. He was the Liberal member for Bellarine in the Victorian Legislative Assembly from 1992 to 2002. His businesses included agriculture.
- Jonathan Spry (born 28 July 1977) is the CEO and co-founder of Envelop Risk, an innovative cyber risk (re)insurance firm based in London and Bermuda.
