= St Anthony in Roseland =

Village in Cornwall, England

Coordinates: 50.149°N 5.000°W

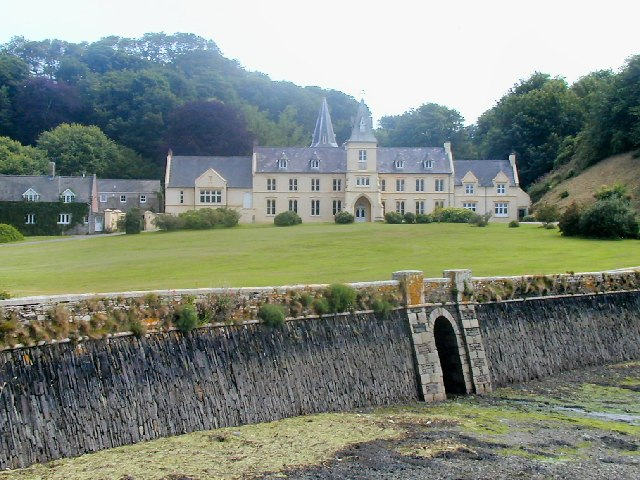
- Place House

- Location within Cornwall
- Civil parish: Gerrans
- Unitary authority: Cornwall
- Shire county: Cornwall
- Region: South West
- Country: England
- Sovereign state: United Kingdom
- Police: Devon and Cornwall
- Fire: Cornwall
- Ambulance: South Western

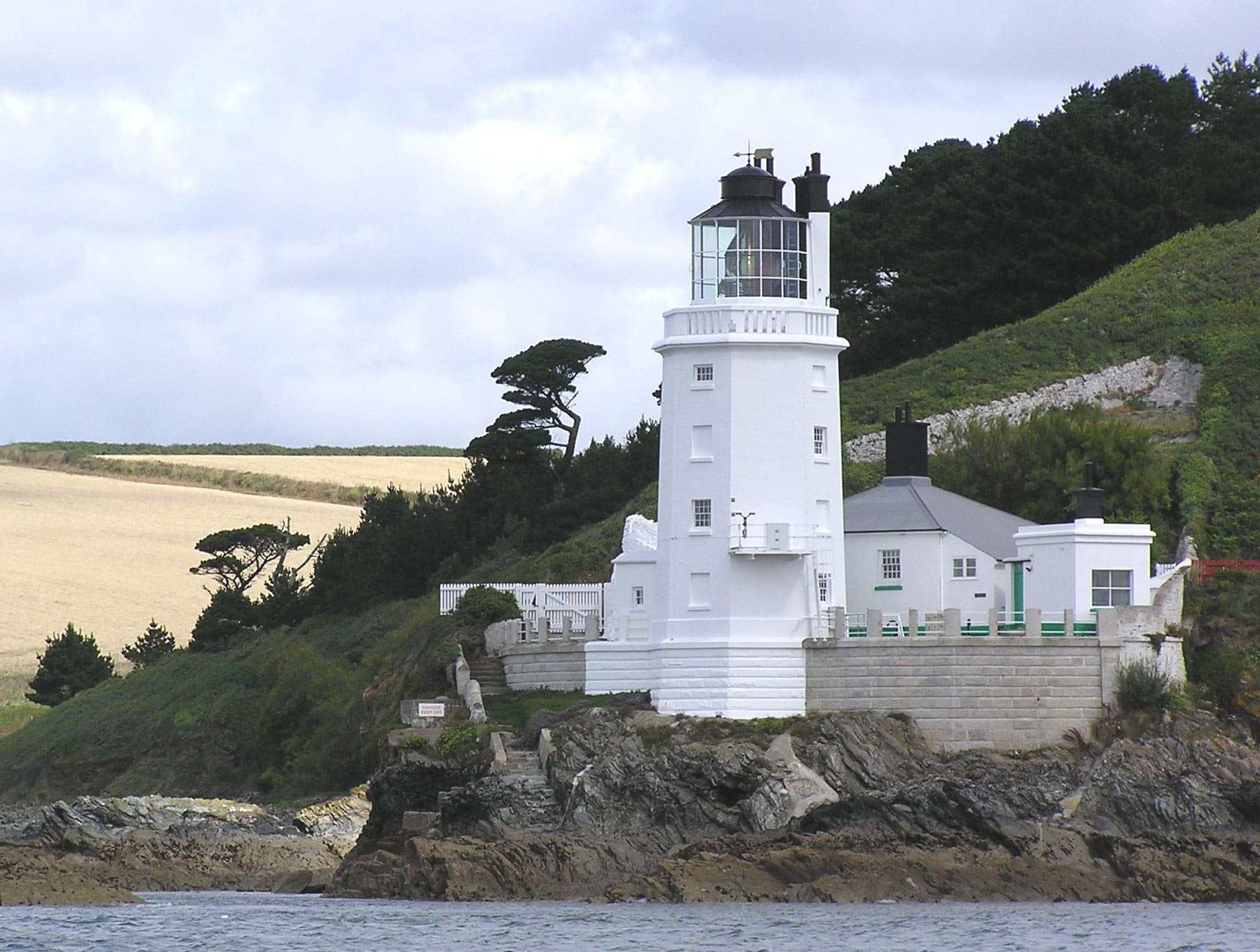
St Anthony's Lighthouse

St Anthony in Roseland is a village in the civil parish of Gerrans, in Cornwall, England. It is a small settlement on the Roseland Peninsula.

At Trewince is a house of five bays and two storeys built in 1750. There is a lighthouse at St Anthony's Head built of granite.

On 1 April 1934 the parish was abolished and merged with Gerrans. At the 1931 census (the last before the abolition of the parish), St Anthony in Roseland had a population of 100.

== Parish church ==
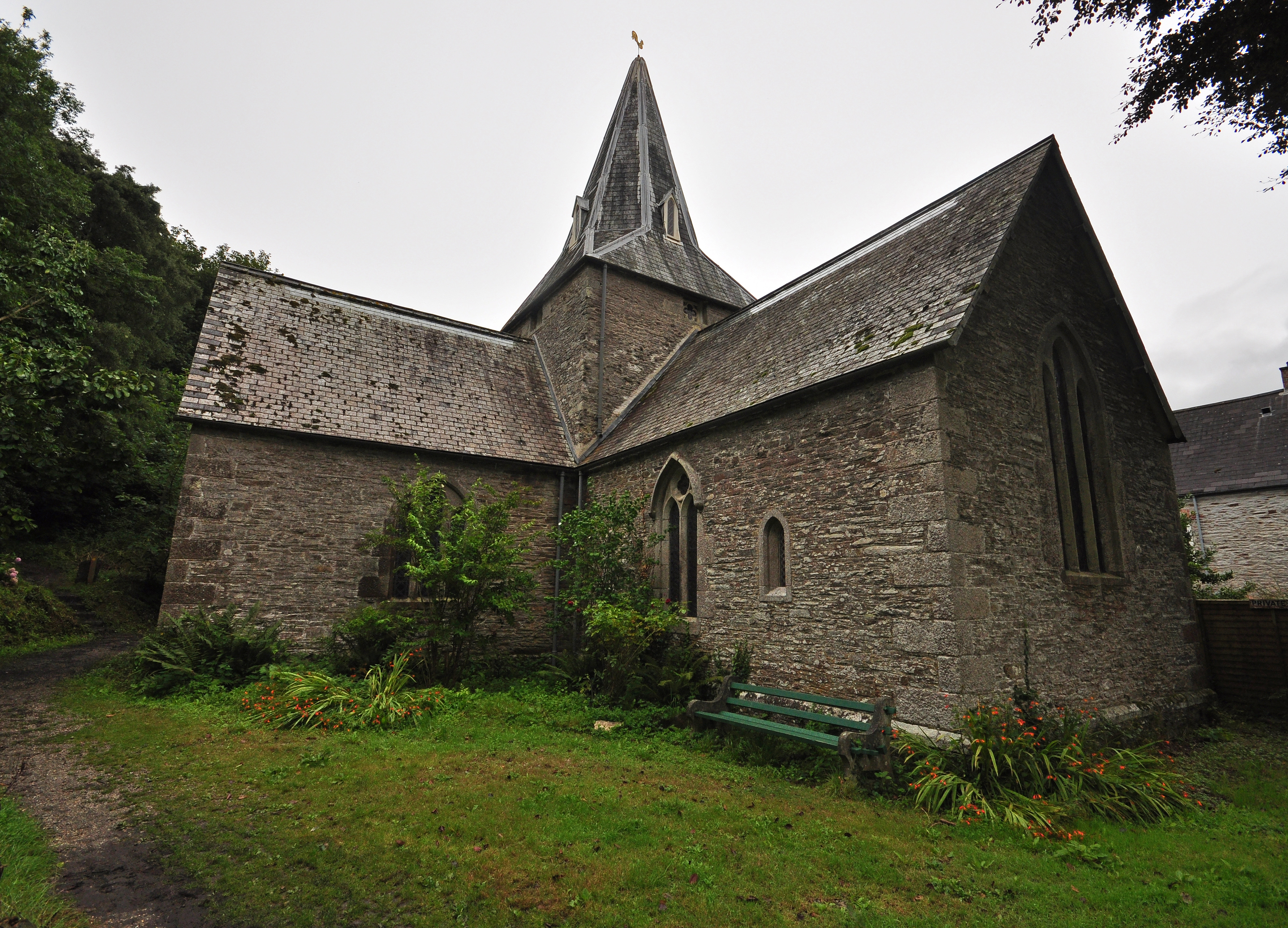
St Anthony's church

The parish church of St Anthony was built in 1150 and dedicated to St Antoninus King and Martyr. It has been designated as a Grade II* listed building and is now in the care of the Churches Conservation Trust. The church was established by the prior of the Augustinian Priory at Plympton in Devon. The site of the former priory is now the site of the house of the Spry family, Place, which was built in 1840 in front of the church. After the dissolution of 1538 part of the priory was used as a residence and parts were pulled down: much of the stone went towards the building of St Mawes Castle. The church still has its original mediaeval cruciform plan, more or less as it was built in the 12th and 13th centuries, despite having been extensively restored in the 19th century. The restoration was commissioned by Samuel Thomas Spry, Member of Parliament (MP) for Bodmin between 1832 and 1841, who employed his cousin, the Revd Clement Carlyon to rebuild the chancel, and install the wooden roofs, floor tiles and stained glass. The church contains monuments to members of the Spry family. The tower is above the crossing and has a spire of timber and lead; there are many memorials of the Spry family including Sir Richard Spry. The church is now one of three in the care of the priest-in-charge of Gerrans and Philleigh.
