= Catherine Payton Phillips =

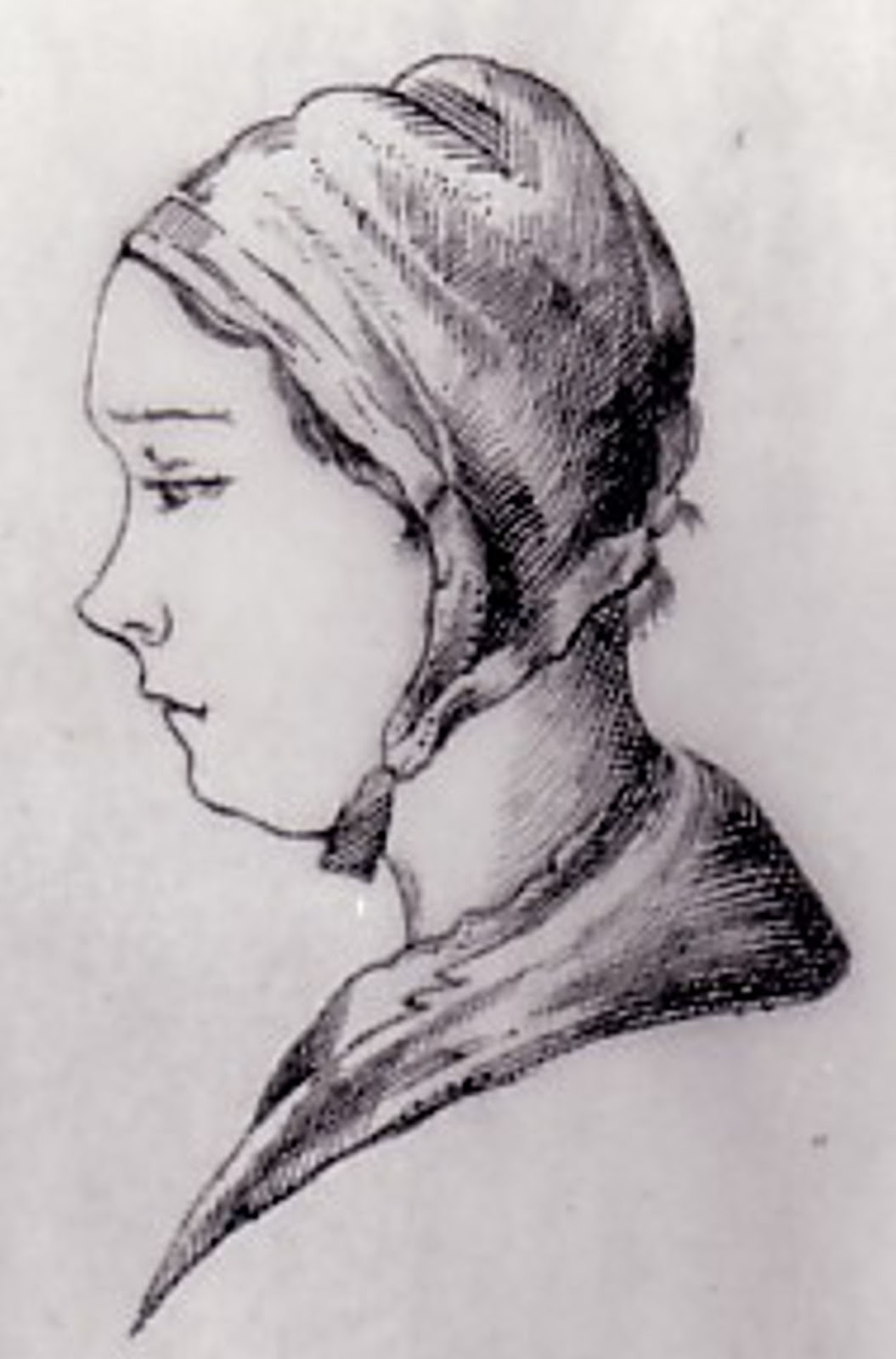
Catherine Phillips

Catherine Phillips, born Payton (16 March 1727 – 16 August 1794) was a Quaker Minister, who travelled in England, Wales, Scotland, Holland and the American colonies. Her first name is sometimes spelled "Catharine".

== Early life and education ==
Payton was born at Dudley, Worcestershire, the daughter of Henry Payton (1671–1746), and his second wife, Ann (c.1673–1774), daughter of Henry and Elizabeth Fowler of Evesham. She did not attend school until her late teens but studied and read widely, at home. She eventually decided that poetry, philosophy, and history were distracting her from religion. She spent much time reading to her paralysed father.

== Role as a minister ==
She was recognised as a Minister at Dudley Meeting around 1748. Her travels in Ireland included those with Mary Peisley in Ireland in 1751. She converted Samuel Neale who became an important Quaker minister and (later) Peisley's husband.

A theme of Payton's approach was her advocacy of an even greater role for women within Quakerism. She wanted the church to change its structures to allow this. At an annual London meeting, she, Mary Peisley and four others proposed that a separate women's group should be formed within the Quakers. This was accepted, but not until 1784.

== Travels across the Thirteen Colonies ==
She travelled across the Thirteen Colonies from 1753 to 1756 with Mary Peisley. They rode 8,000 miles (13,000 km) "often through thinly inhabited country, braving dangerous creeks, swamps, and wild animals", visiting the Province of North Carolina, the Province of South Carolina, the Colony of Virginia, the Province of Maryland, New England, and the Province of Pennsylvania. During their tour Peisley noted a "low state of discipline" among Quakers in America, and saw a need for reformation. Her letters and records of this journey "were to be seen 70 years later as prophesying the separations that took place within the Religious Society of Friends in 1827 and 1828".

== Marriage and settling in Cornwall ==
On 17 March 1757, Peisley married Samuel Neale. Peisley died three days later. Payton had met William Phillips, a copper agent and widower, in 1749. She married him in 1772, when she moved to his home in Redruth, Cornwall.

== Death ==
She died on 16 August 1794 and was buried at the Quaker Burial Ground, Come-to-Good, in the parish of Kea, near Truro. Her stepson, James Phillips, a Quaker printer, published her Memoirs and some other writing after her death. James's sons, Richard Phillips (1778–1851) and William Phillips (1775–1828) were Fellows of the Royal Society.

== Publications ==
- An Epistle to Friends in Ireland [on vital religion], Dublin, 1776.
- To the principal inhabitants of the County of Cornwall ... about to assemble at Truro, ... on the mining concerns of this county [urging the formation of "a code of moral stannary laws," etc.]. (Redruth, 6th of the 12th month, 1791.).
- An address to the principal inhabitants of the county of Cornwall who are about to assemble at Truro ... on the mining concerns of that county, 8 pages. J. West: Stourbridge, 1792
- Considerations on the Causes of the High Price of Grain . . . with occasional remarks 1792.
- Reasons why the People called Quakers cannot so fully unite with the Methodists in their Missions to the Negroes in the West India Islands and Africa as freely to contribute thereto London, 1792.
- To the lower class of people in the western part of the county of Cornwall, J. Phillips: London, 1793, 8 pages.
- The Happy King, a Sacred Poem, with occasional remarks. Respectfully addressed to George III privately printed, 1794 [against Slavery].
- Memoirs of the Life of Catherine Phillips, to which are added some of her Epistles London, James Phillips, 1797.
- Some of her discourses are appended to those of Samuel Fothergill in Some Discourses, Epistles and Letters by ... S. Fothergill, etc. London, James Phillips, 1803:
1. Discourse delivered at Fryar's Meeting House, Bristol 5th of Fifth Month 1779 p. 149–171
2. Prayer: discourse delivered at Westminster 5th Month 19th, 1782 p. 172–176
3. A Discourse at the Meeting-House in Westminster 17th of the 5th Month 1780 p. 177–195.
- Some letters are printed in John Kendall's Letters on Religious Subjects by divers Friends deceased 1805, Volume 2.
- According to the Gentleman's Magazine obituary (1795), "Mrs. Phillips is said to have had considerable knowledge in medicine and botany, and to have published something on planting and beautifying waste grounds,' but no such work appears to be known".
