= Mary Palmer (born 1750) =

Marchioness of Thomond

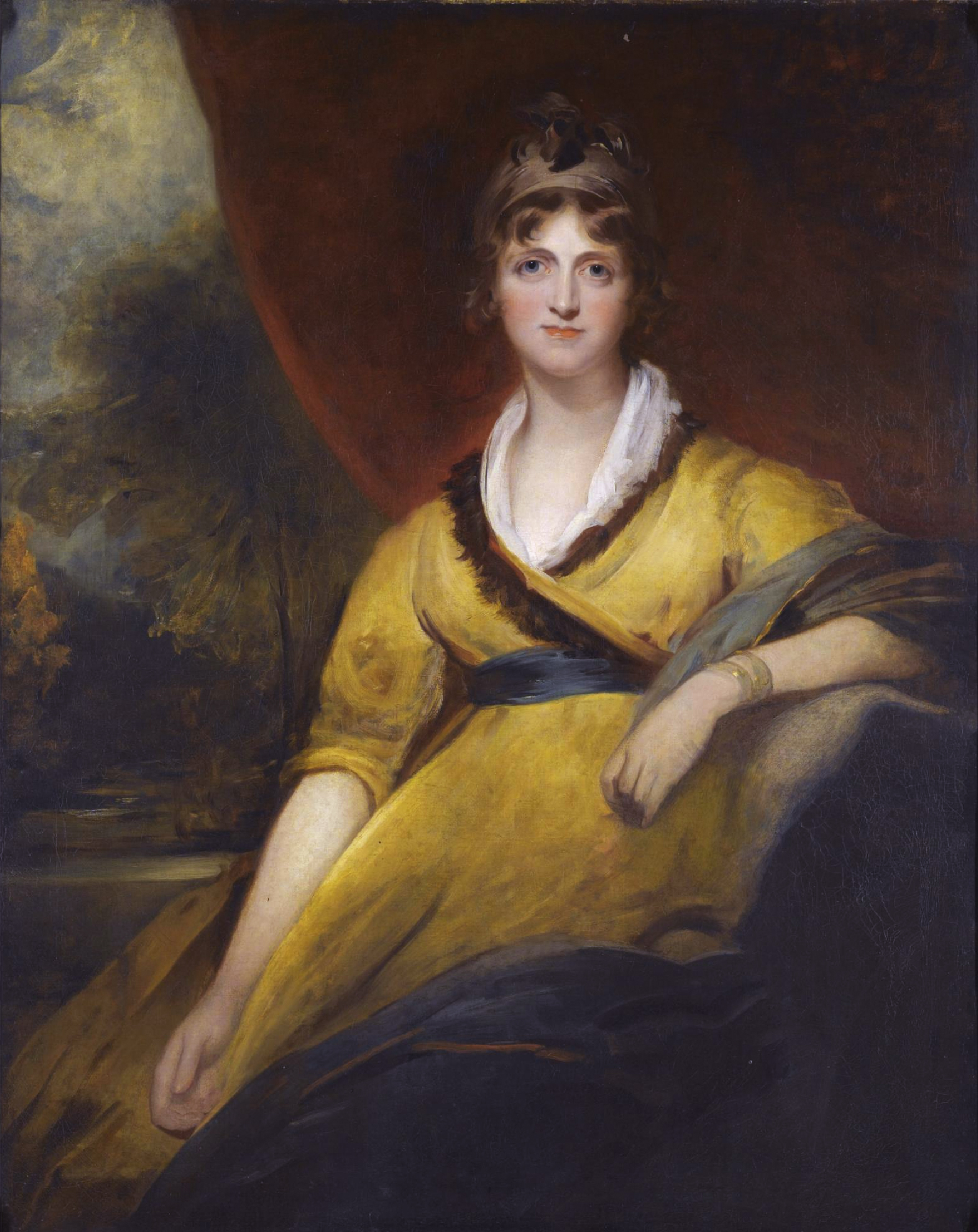
Mary, Countess of Inchiquin (1750–1820), by Thomas Lawrence

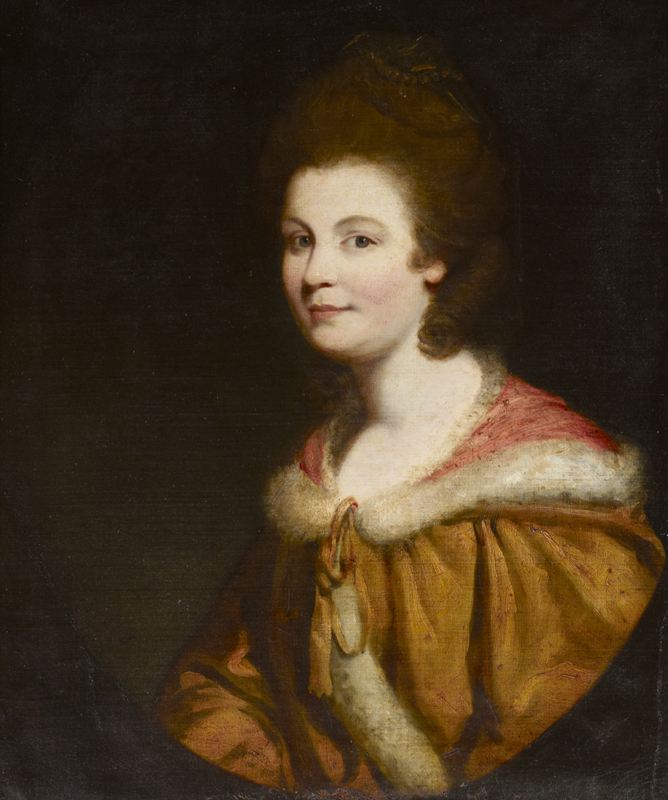
Mary O'Brien (née Palmer), Countess of Inchiquin, by Thomas Phillips after original by her uncle Sir Joshua Reynolds, Petworth House, Sussex.

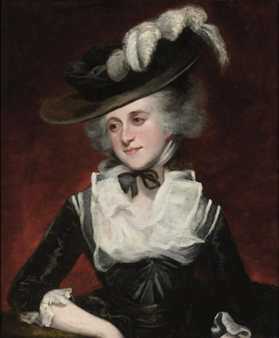
Mary O'Brien (née Palmer), Countess of Inchiquin, painted before 1785 by her uncle Sir Joshua Reynolds. Collection of Fairfax House, City of York

Mary Palmer (1750 – 6 September 1820), Marchioness of Thomond, was a member of the British gentry and by marriage of the Irish peerage.

== Life ==
She was the eldest daughter of John Palmer (1708–1770) of Palmer House, Great Torrington, Devon, by his wife Mary Reynolds (1716–1794). John's wife Mary was an elder sister of the painter Sir Joshua Reynolds (1723–1792).

On 21 July 1792 she became the second wife of Murrough O'Brien, Earl of Inchiquin, later Marquess of Thomond, who had been widowed in 1790. She was painted at least three times by her uncle Joshua and as the chief beneficiary of his will she was able to pay off her husband's debts, though they had no children.
