= Anna Williams (poet) =

Welsh poet (1706–1783)

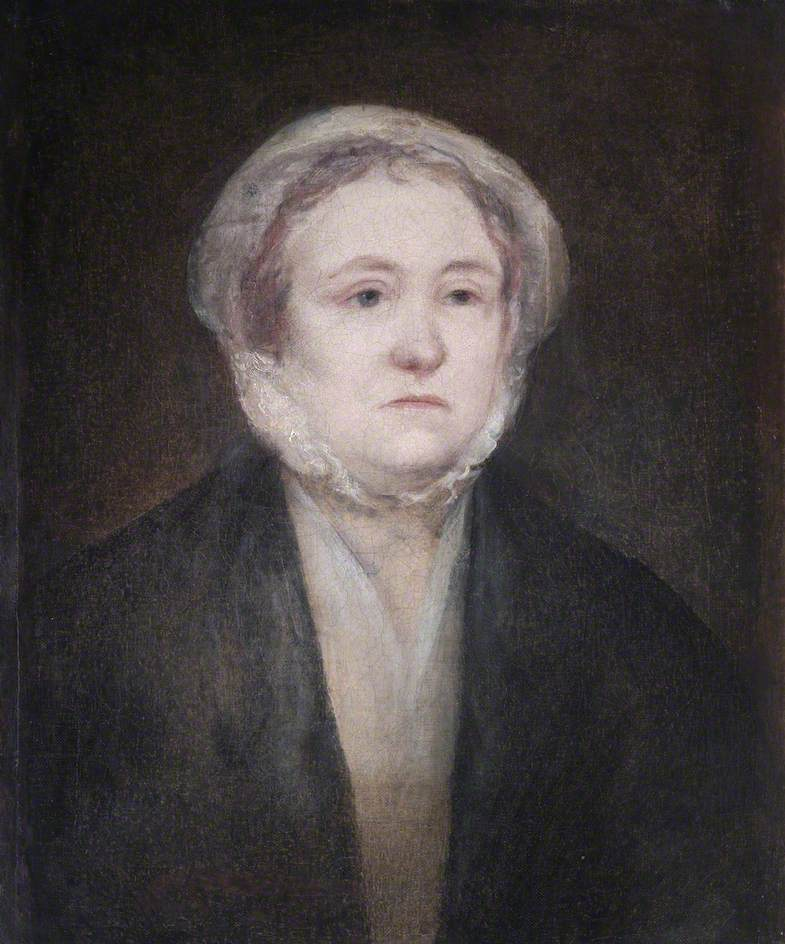
Anna Williams by Frances Reynolds

Anna Williams (1706 – 6 September 1783) was a Welsh poet. She was a close companion of the writer Samuel Johnson, who said he was "very desolate" when she died. Cataracts left Williams blind or visually impaired in the 1740s, when Johnson took her under his wing and helped to support her. She joined his household until her death, apart from an interval of six years. In return, Williams supervised Johnson's household management and expenses. Besides poetry, she wrote an unfinished dictionary of philosophical terms and translated and published a French biography of the emperor Julian.

== Life ==
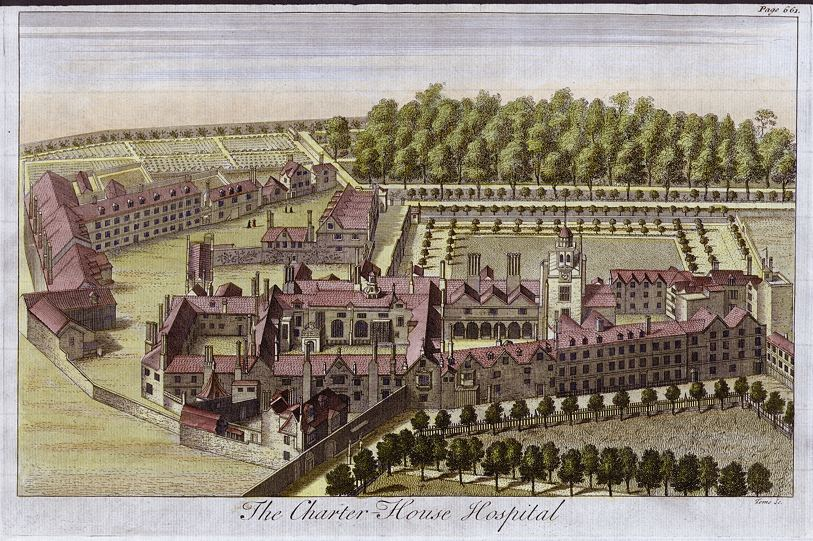
Charterhouse Hospital, engraved by Toms, c.1770..

=== Early life ===
She was born at Rosemarket, Pembrokeshire to Zachariah Williams (1668/73–1755), a scientist and physician, and his wife, Martha. Her father provided her with a wide artistic and scientific education, Italian and French. In 1726–27, the family moved to London, staying at the Charterhouse, where Anna helped her father while he experimented with magnetism in pursuit of the longitude prize and became his home-help, when he became bedridden and hospitalised in 1745. Despite failing sight in the 1740s, she was able to sew, and in 1746 published a translation of a French life of the emperor Julian.

=== Life with Johnson ===
In 1748 her father was ejected from hospital and they appealed to Dr Johnson, who had taken an interest in Williams's experiments and assisted him in publishing his theory of longitude. Later, Johnson also arranged for Samuel Sharp to operate on Anna's cataracts. After this failed, she became a member of his household, until just before her death, living with Johnson in all his various residences. The only exception is the period from 1759 to 1765, when he moved from Gough Street into the Inner Temple, during which time she lodged in Bolt Court, Fleet Street – there Johnson drank tea with her "every night... before he went home, however late it might be, and she always sat up for him." In August 1763, Boswell proudly made good his "title to be a privileged man" by being "carried by [Johnson] in the evening to drink tea with Miss Williams".

In 1765 Williams moved back into Johnson's household in 7 Johnson's Court, Fleet Street, and then from March 1776 until her death in 8 Bolt Court, supervising his household management and expenses from a ground-floor apartment in both houses. Regularly helping Johnson when he entertained at home, she also accompanied him on visits, or if not, had a dish sent home to her by him. Knowing a variety of literary works, she could express herself well, and having lived long with Johnson, knew his habits and how to draw him out into conversation, whilst Johnson was not above playfulness towards her: Frances Reynolds records that he would "whirl her about on the steps" when visiting.

Anna had annual gifts of money from acquaintances, including Lady Philipps of Picton Castle, an old family friend, but this income was supplemented by Johnson. For example, he arranged for David Garrick to give a benefit performance of Aaron Hill's Merope at the Drury Lane theatre on 22 January 1756 "for a gentlewoman deprived of her sight". In 1774, Johnson helped with her application to Hetherington's charity at Christ's Hospital, although this failed as Welsh applicants were ineligible.

=== Last days and death ===
As Williams grew old and frail she became more and more intolerant towards other members of the household, although this did not affect Johnson's care for her. He wrote a prayer for her in her last illness, and after her death wrote, "Her curiosity was universal, her knowledge was very extensive, and she sustained forty years of misery with steady fortitude. Thirty years and more she has been my companion, and her death has left me very desolate." His circle, while noting her peevishness, also acknowledged her learning and intelligence. She left £200 in stocks at her death, and £157.14s. in cash to the Ladies' Charity School, Snow Hill, London.

== Works ==
- Miscellanies in Prose and Verse, published in 1766 as a quarto edition by Thomas Davies with Johnson adding a preface and several prose and verse pieces. First advertised in 1750, there were waspish claims from Anna's friends that Johnson had not put himself out in getting it produced, though it was moderately successful and earned the author about £150.
- A dictionary of philosophical terms probably inspired by Johnson's own Dictionary – begun in 1754 but abandoned despite Johnson's support. (He wrote to Richardson the printer, "She understands chimistry and many other arts.")
- Occasional verses, such as "On the Death of Sir Erasmus Philipps, Unfortunately Drowned in the River Avon".

Her Dictionary of National Biography entry states that "as a writer Williams had craft but not genius... [a writer of] capable [and] effective if conventional... verses". Miscellanies is a collection of disparate pieces, verse, prose, and dramatic fragments. Alexander Pope is an influence, as seen in this quotation:

For me, contented with a humble state
'Twas ne'er my care, or fortune, to be great.

== Sources ==
- Jones, William R. "Williams, Anna". Oxford Dictionary of National Biography (online ed.). Oxford University Press. doi:10.1093/ref:odnb/29486. (Subscription, Wikipedia Library access or UK public library membership required.). The first edition of this text is available at Wikisource: "Williams, Anna" . Dictionary of National Biography. London: Smith, Elder & Co. 1885–1900.
- Boswell, Life, 1.232–3, 241, 350, 393, 421, 463; 2.5, 286, 427; 3.48, 132; 4.235; 5.276
- J. Hawkins, The life of Samuel Johnson, LL.D., ed. B. H. Davis (1962), 134–6
- Lady Knight, 'Anecdotes and remarks', in Johnsonian miscellanies, ed. G. B. Hill, 2 (1897), 171–5
- J. P. Phillips, 'Mrs Anna Williams', N&Q, 3rd ser., 1 (1862), 421–2
- Richard Fenton, A Historical Tour through Pembrokeshire (1811), 197–200
- Johnsonian miscellanies, ed. G. B. Hill, 2 vols. (1897), vol. 1, pp. 114–15, 401–3; vol. 2, pp. 217–18, 279
- The letters of Samuel Johnson, ed. R. W. Chapman, 3 (1952), 69–75
- Nichols, Lit. anecdotes, 2.178–84
- G. W. Stone, ed., The London stage, 1660–1800, pt 4: 1747–1776 (1962), 522
- ESD Journal
