= Robert Lovell Gwatkin =

English landowner

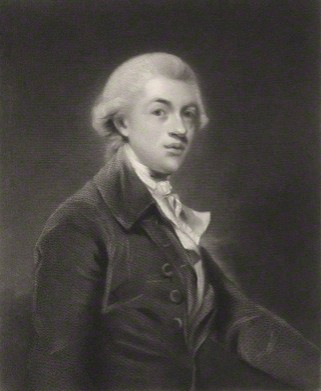
Robert Lovell Gwatkin c.1781, after Sir Joshua Reynolds

Robert Lovell Gwatkin (1757–1843) was an English landowner, High Sheriff of Cornwall in 1789.

== Early life ==
He was the son of Edward Gwatkin (died 1764), a merchant in Bristol, and his wife Ann(e) Lovell. Ann Lovell Gwatkin came to know Hannah More, at school with her daughter, and became an important supporter. His father's will, in which Edward Gwatkin describes himself as a soapmaker, made Robert Lovell Gwatkin his residual legatee at age 21. He was an heir also, on his mother's side, to the family of Bedford of Launceston. Gwatkin's sister, Charlotte Ann, married William Gregor. His three younger brother were John, a Royal Navy officer, Edward, a solicitor who married Octavia, daughter of Henry Harnage of the 62nd Regiment and Thomas who died unmarried.

Gwatkin was admitted to the Middle Temple on 21 May 1774, and to St John's College, Cambridge two days later. There he graduated B.A. in 1778, and M.A. by royal mandate the same year. He was a student friend of William Pitt the younger. In 1779, during the American Revolutionary War, he was courting Theophila Palmer, his future wife. Fanny Burney, visiting the Reynoldses that year, found him very talkative with her, and no one else. He also joined a militia camp defending Plymouth from a possible French invasion, with John Beauchamp and John Vivian, heading Cornish miners from Gwennap.

== Marriage and Killiow House ==
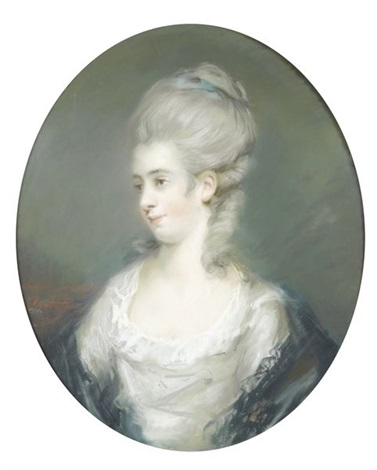
Pastel portrait of Theophila Palmer by Frances Reynolds

By his marriage in 1781 to Theophila, a niece of Sir Joshua Reynolds, Gwatkin became closely involved with the Reynolds family; his mother knew Frances Reynolds by the 1770s. He was chief mourner in 1792 at the funeral for Sir Joshua. In his will, Reynolds left Theophila £10,000.

Gwatkin resided at Kea, Cornwall, at Killiow, which he bought from the estate of David Haweis. He rebuilt the mansion there as Killiow House, remodelled externally in the mid-19th century but retaining much of the early 19th century interior, and now a grade II* listed building. He was acquainted with Edmund Burke, and James Boswell who visited Cornwall in 1792. Maria Edgeworth described him as "Roast Beef of old England, king and constitution man."

Also at Kea, Gwatkin had a new church built, All Hallows, on a changed site, to a design by James Wyatt; it was opened in 1802. His wife Theophila provided decorative painting. The design proved defective, however, with cracks appearing, and in 1869 it was decided to rebuild. With a fund started in 1871 by the Rev. John Daubuz, the rebuilt church was opened in 1894, including a painted altar piece with angel heads by Theophila Gwatkin.

The Cornwall survey of 1811 compiled by George Bouchier Worgan for the General View of Agriculture mentions Gwatkin a number of times as an improving farmer. In March 1813 Killiow House, "late in the possession of Robert Lovell Gwatkin", was put up to let. In "additions and corrections" to Magna Britannia (1814) it is described as "unoccupied". The Bedford property included Tregarne, and Fursdon in Liskeard. Gwatkin broke up the manor of Fursdon in 1813–4. He also sold Advent in 1814, to Allen Searell. In 1816, the Rev. Jeremiah Trist at Veryan, over the estuary from Kea, and whose daughter Charlotte married Gwatkin's son John, wrote of abatement of rents, debt and the distress of labourers affecting farming in his area of Cornwall.

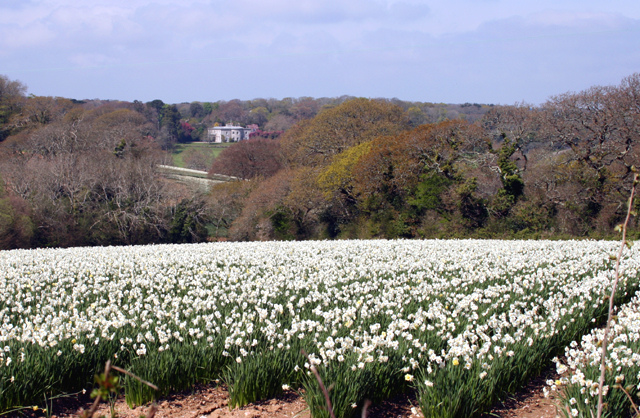
Killiow House today

== Later life ==
The Historical Survey of the County of Cornwall written by Charles Sandoe Gilbert and published 1817–20 said that Killiow house remained vacant, and Gwatkin, "one of the most respectable magistrates belonging to the county of Cornwall, has of late resided chiefly in Devon."

Mary, Dowager Marchioness of Thomond, died on 6 September 1820; she was Theophila's sister. Edward Gwatkin (1759–1832), Gwatkin's brother, had been a trustee of the wedding settlement of Mary and her husband, then Lord Inchiquin, since 1799. He already knew them socially, dining with them on 3 March 1794, as reported by James Boswell. According to John Cam Hobhouse in his diary for 22 May 1821, covering a London dinner with Gwatkin, Gwatkin and his Palmer relations stood to benefit substantially from the sale of Reynolds pictures left by the Marchioness. At this period Gwatkin is also placed in London by the diary of Joseph Farington. The sale took place on 21 May 1821 and the following day.

One of the Gwatkin daughters, Harriet, was engaged, though only for a short period in 1821, to John Herschel. Richard Gwatkin (born 1791, son of Thomas Gwatkin), a relation, was a friend of Herschel's, and an introduction may have taken place at his house.

Henry William Pickersgill painted two portraits of Hannah More, and one was a commission from Gwatkin. The version in the National Portrait Gallery, London is dated 1822. More left Gwatkin, in her will, the volumes of the Christian Oratory of Benjamin Bennet.

In 1832 Gwatkin retired from the Cornish Club, which he had joined in 1782. Around 1833, he moved to Plymouth, where he lived for the last ten years of his life. The Daubuz family, owners of the nearby tin mine at Carvedras, Truro, built onto Killiow House.

At the 1832 general election Gwatkin seconded Edward Wynne-Pendarves as candidate for Cornwall West, who had been proposed by Sir Hussey Vivian, remarking that he himself had been a reformer for 50 years. At the West Cornwall county election meeting of 1835, he praised the Reform Act 1832. For the 1837 general election, he addressed an election meeting to support the liberal candidates for East Cornwall, held in Devonport. In 1841 he was part of a Plymouth deputation to Lord John Russell, with Thomas Gill the local Member of Parliament and others.

Gwatkin died in Plymouth on 5 April 1843, aged 86, and was buried at Kea.

== Family ==
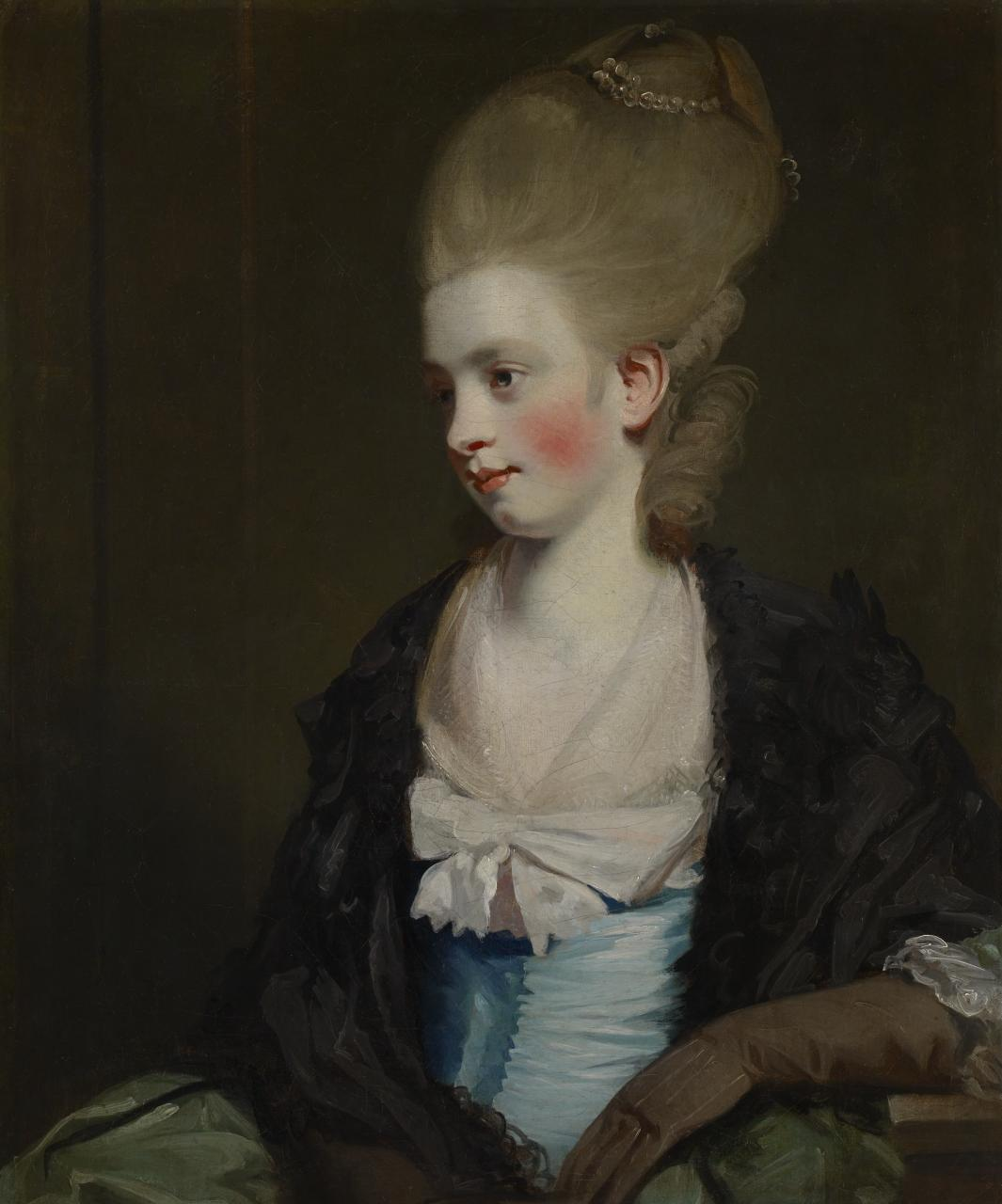
Theophila Palmer c. 1777, studio of Joshua Reynolds

Gwatkin married Theophila Palmer, daughter of John Palmer of Great Torrington and Mary Palmer (1716–1794), née Reynolds, sister of Sir Joshua Reynolds. She was known as "Offy", and had lived with the Reynolds family for a decade before the marriage, which took place in 1781. Their children were:

- Edward (1784–1855), who became a Major-General in the Bengal Army, married Hetty Elizabeth Gascoigne. The artist John Reynolds Gwatkin (1807–1877) was their son. Edward Gwatkin, the eldest son, died at sea on 13 April 1855, on board HMS Hotspur, after 50 years in India.
- John, married Charlotte Fincher Trist. He was a director of the Cornish Railway, and died in 1855.
- Robert (c.1793–1821), married Miss Green, died at Brompton in February 1821 at age 28
- Theophila (1782–1844) married in 1816 at Meerut Robert Lowther, son of Col. Lowther MP, childless. His second wife, whom he married in 1847 in Allahabad, was Laura Martindale.
- Anne, died unmarried 1868, or by March 1864 (if of 21, Princess Square, Plymouth)
- Mary (1794–1879), third daughter, married in 1844 as his second wife Edward Beauchamp St John (died 1856)
- Fanny, fourth daughter, died 1814
- Harriet, married Major Edward Jones, Royal Marines, on 31 December 1839 in Plymouth. She died at her father's house, in Princess Square, Plymouth, on 13 December 1840.
- Elizabeth and Kate O'Brien, who with Fanny had no children. There were no grandchildren, in fact, through the female lines.

Theophila Gwatkin often acted as a model for Reynolds, in pictures from Girl with a Muff to Comedy, according to family tradition, in Garrick between Comedy and Tragedy. She was also an artist, who made copies of his works. Some attributions to her, such as copies of the "Cardinal Virtues" designed by Reynolds for stained glass in the chapel of New College, Oxford, have been challenged. She wrote a work on Devonshire dialect. She died at age 91, in 1848, at the rectory of her son-in-law Beauchamp St John. Her will left a house in Princess Square, Plymouth to the daughters Anne Gwatkin and Mary St John.

== Reynolds legacy ==
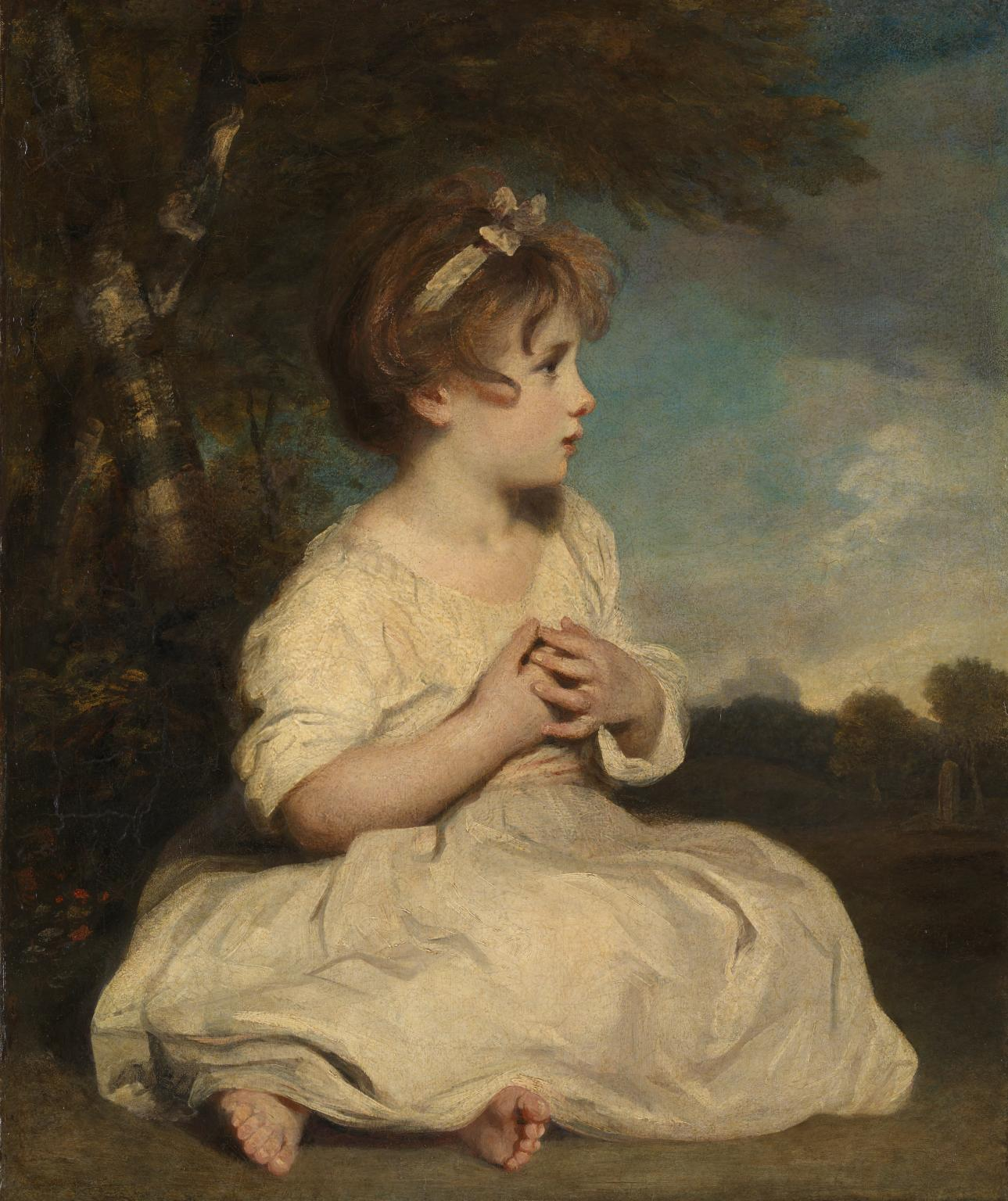
Reynolds "The Age of Innocence" there is unproven speculation the sitter was Theophila Gwatkin

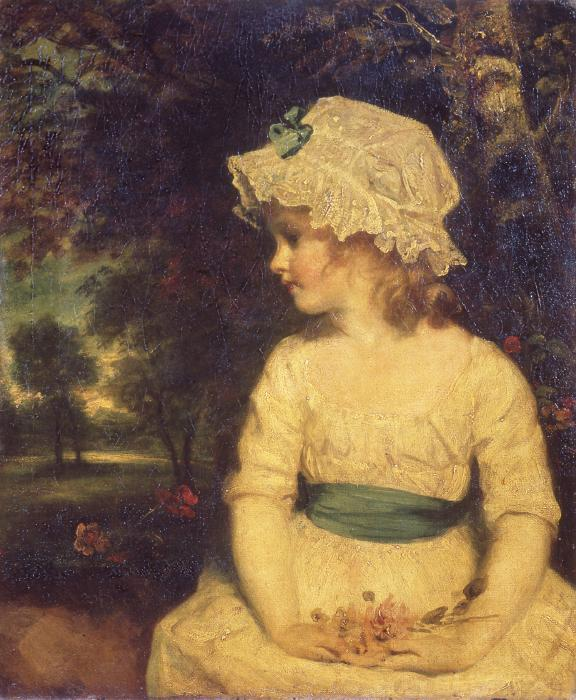
Theophila Gwatkin, c.1785, as "Simplicity", portrait painted by Joshua Reynolds as a present to Robert Lovell and Theophila Gwatkin, in the family to 1884

Gwatkin bought in 1821, after the death of his sister-in-law, the Marchioness of Thomond, two of the sketch-books of Reynolds, and had Joseph Skelton create facsimiles. Editions of sketch-books were later published in works by William Cotton (1859), and as revised by Charles Robert Leslie with Tom Taylor.

Benjamin Robert Haydon travelled in 1845 to Plymouth, to see Theophila Gwatkin and consult the Reynolds papers. He was researching the reason why Reynolds briefly resigned from the Royal Academy, in 1790. She corrected some reminiscences of James Northcote of his life as a Reynolds apprentice.

In the 1850s, 19 pocket books (sitter books) by Reynolds were owned by Miss Gwatkin of Princess Square, Plymouth. She possessed a number of Reynolds portraits. and she also passed on Reynolds's memoir of his friend Samuel Johnson, published by Leslie and Taylor. Ledgers of Reynolds passed to Theophila and then John Reynolds Gwatkin. He sold them in 1873 to Henry Graves, who passed them to his son Algernon Graves. Charles Fairfax Murray bought them from Algernon Graves in 1904, and gave them to the Fitzwilliam Museum in 1916.
