= Porth Kea =

Hamlet in Cornwall, England

Coordinates: 50.238°N 5.047°W

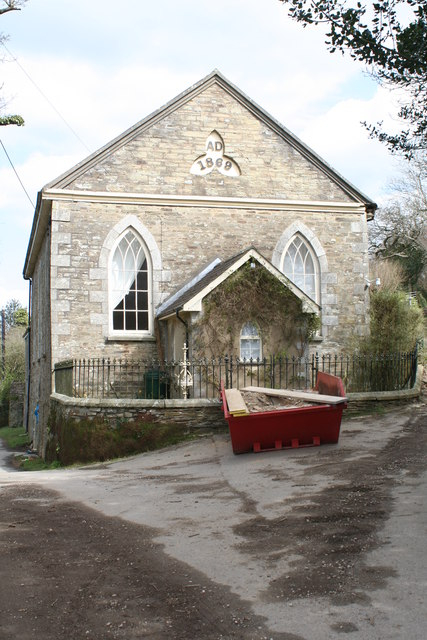
- Porth Kea Methodist Church

- Location within Cornwall
- OS grid reference: SW828420
- Civil parish: Kea
- Unitary authority: Cornwall
- Ceremonial county: Cornwall
- Region: South West
- Country: England
- Sovereign state: United Kingdom

Porth Kea or Porthkea is a hamlet in Kea parish, south of Truro in Cornwall, England. It lies south-east of Kea village, on the other side of the A39.

Porth Kea Methodist Church was built in 1869 and extended in 1877.
