= Theophila Gwatkin =

British artist (1757–1848)

Theophila "Offy" Gwatkin
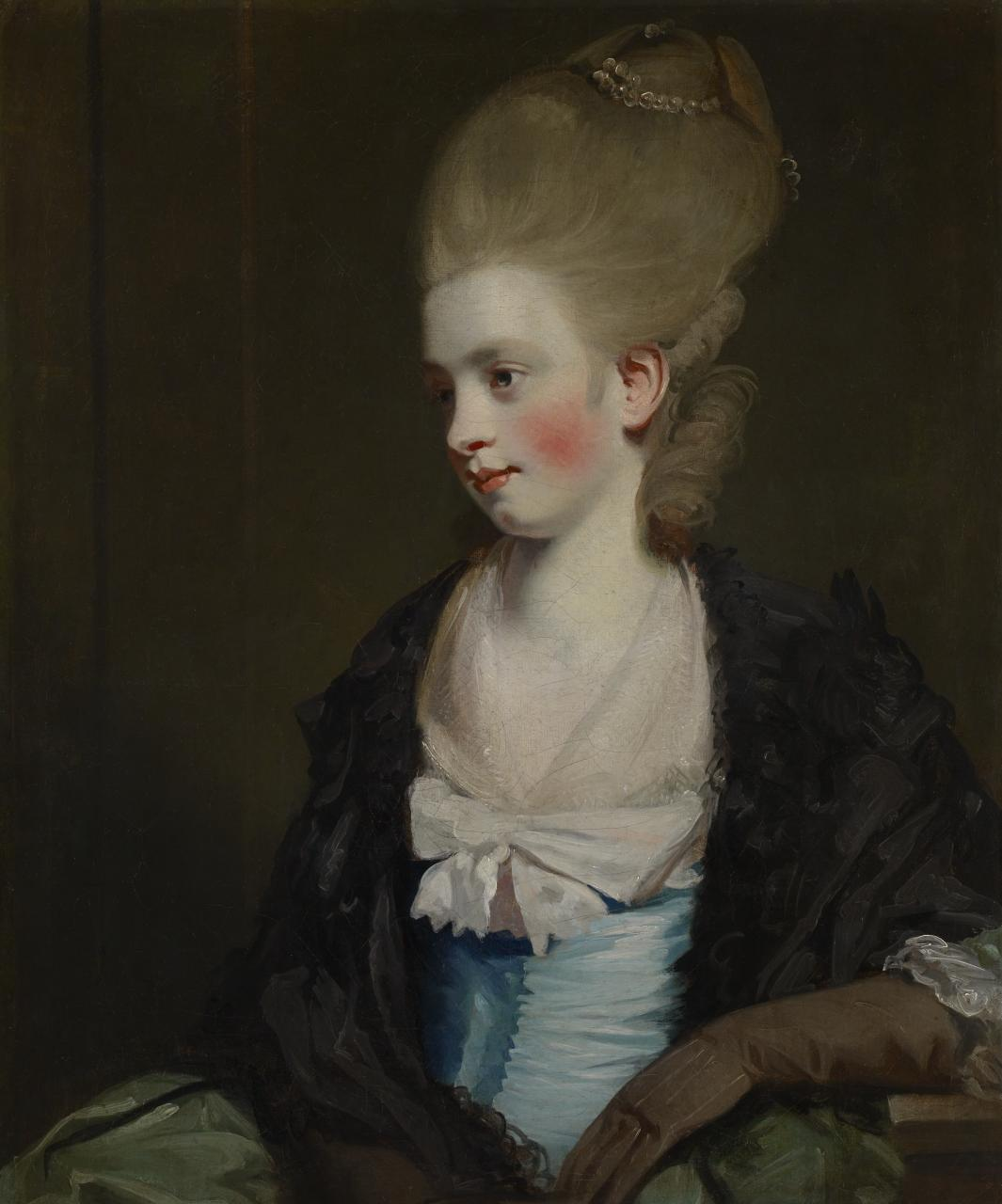
- Theophila Gwatkin painted by Joshua Reynolds
- Born: May 15, 1757; Great Torrington, Devon
- Died: July 4, 1848 (aged 91); Devon
- Style: Painting
- Spouse: Robert Lovell Gwatkin
- Mother: Mary Reynolds
- Relatives: Joshua Reynolds (uncle)

Theophila "Offy" Gwatkin (née Palmer; 15 May 1757 – 4 July 1848) was a British painter. She is described as an amateur artist and is best known for pictures painted of her by her uncle Sir Joshua Reynolds. She also compiled, added a preface, footnote glosses and a dictionary of dialect terms to her mother's, Mary Reynolds, A Devonshire Dialogue.

== Life ==
Theophila Palmer was born on 15 May 1757 in Great Torrington, Devon. She was the daughter of Mary Reynolds, author, and John Palmer.

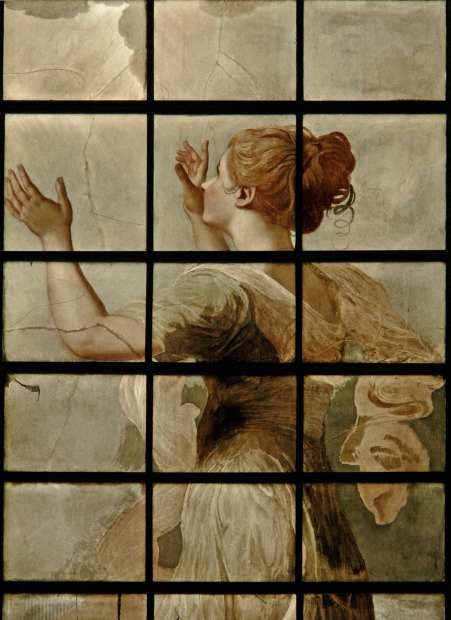
Hope, the West window Of The Chapel, New College, Oxford, painted by Sir Joshua Reynolds c. 1779

Gwatkin’s mother had a passion for art and had a significant influence on her brother, Sir Joshua, when he was a boy. She paid for half of the cost of his apprenticeship to Thomas Hudson and also paid for his expenses while he was in Italy in 1749. When Gwatkin was 13 years old she and her sister, Mary (later Lady Thomond), lodged with Sir Joshua in Leicester Fields, London.

Sir Joshua had great affection for the two sisters. He gave Gwatkin the nickname "Offy", sometimes written as ‘Offee’ or ‘Offe’.

She [Gwatkin] has been very pretty, and, though deaf, is very agreeable - enthusiastically and affectionately fond of her uncle – indignant at the idea of his not having himself written the Discourses; "Burke or Johnson, indeed! no such thing he wrote them himself. I am evidence, he used to employ me as his secretary." – Maria Edgeworth, 1831.

The sisters often sat when he was painting female figures. In particular, Gwatkin sat for many of Sir Joshua’s fancy subjects, notably for the Strawberry Girl, and whilst he was painting David Garrick between the Tragic and Comic Muse, Gwatkin sat for the Comic. She was very young at the time.

Mrs. Gwatkin is not, at present, like the Comic Muse of Reynolds, nor ever was. She had never the embonpoint, or the archness there represented. But she resembles Hope in the windows of New College. In Hope we see her figure, her features, and her air. Not long since (as themselves informed me), the person who shewed those windows to Mr. and Mrs. G. observed to Mrs. Gwatkin: "This figure of Hope, Madam, is a portrait of a niece of Sir J. Reynolds." - Richard Polwhele, 1826.

Sir Joshua's was an artistic household. Robert Haydon recalled a conversation he had with Gwatkin, "Everybody in the house painted. Lady Thomond & herself, the coachman & the man servant Ralph [Kirkley] & his daughter [Caroline Kirkley], all painted, copied & talked about pictures". Gwatkin lived with Sir Joshua until, age 22, she married. Her sister lived with Sir Joshua until his death in 1792.

She married Robert Lovell Gwatkin in 1780. As a wedding gift Sir Joshua gave a portrait of her which he had started painting in 1776. She then became commonly known as Mrs. Gwatkin. They had ten children, seven daughters and three sons.

She may have sat for the painting The Age of Innocence, an oil-on-canvas painting by Sir Joshua, created in either 1785 or 1788. The painting became a favourite of the public and, according to Martin Postle, “the commercial face of childhood”.

Her mother wrote Devonshire Dialogue which had circulated privately, in whole and in extract, before her mother died in 1794. Gwatkin’s nephew, James Fredrick Palmer, combined some of his grandmother’s dialogues alongside his own glossary and published it in 1837.

In 1839, she compiled all of her mother’s dialogues and added a preface, footnote glosses and a dictionary of dialect terms. This, Gwatkin’s, complete version, A Devonshire Dialogue, credits the appended glossary, for the most part, to the late Rev. John Phillips who had died a decade earlier. She died on 4 July 1848, aged 91, while visiting her daughter, at Ideford Rectory, Devonshire.
