= Kea, Cornwall =

Civil parish in Cornwall, England

Coordinates: 50.243°N 5.073°W

Kea: Cornish: Sen Ke
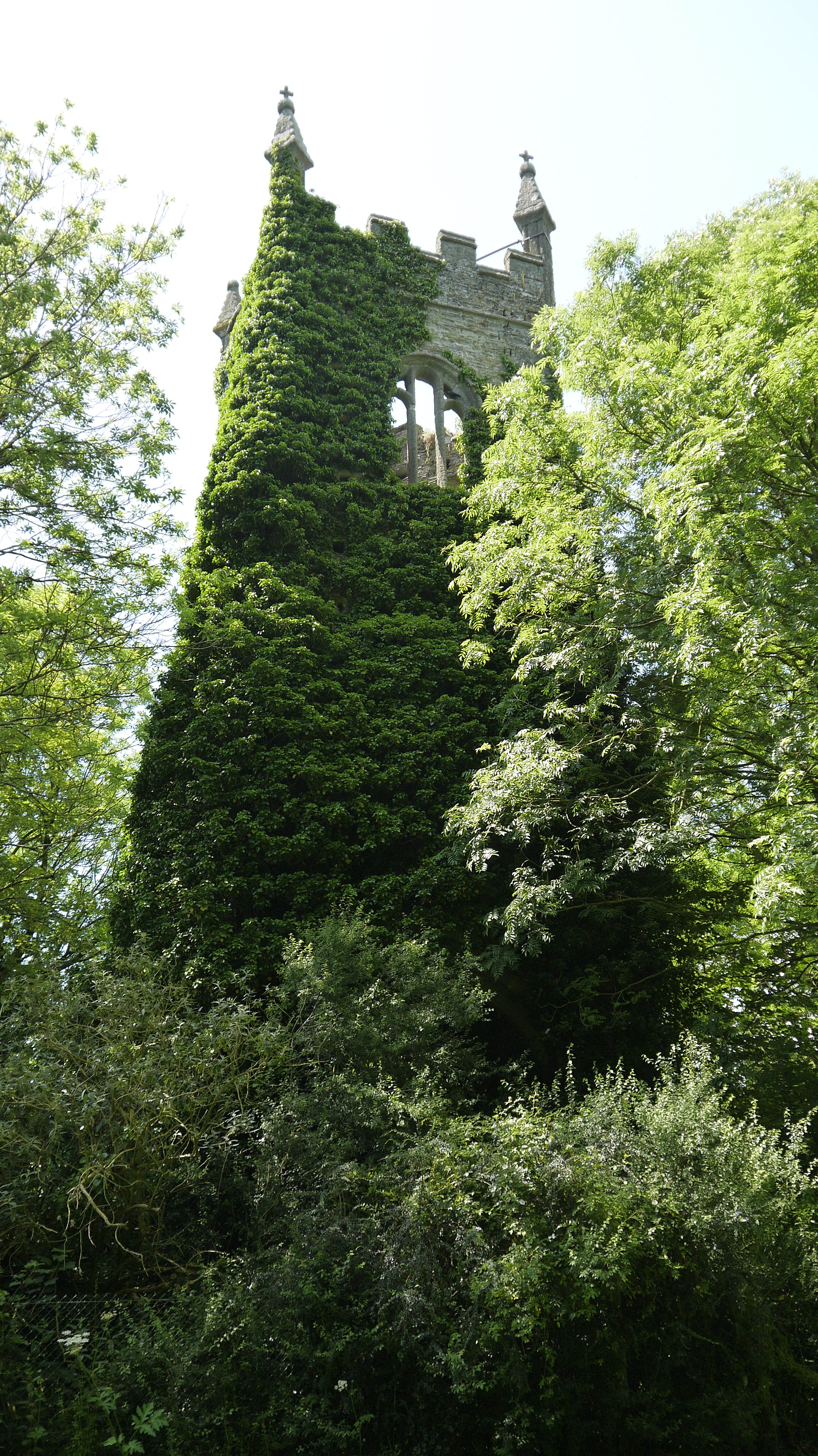
- Old Kea church tower

- Location within Cornwall
- Population: 1,482 (Civil Parish, 2011 including Baldhu, Bissoe, Calenick, Chapel, Come-to-Good, Coombe, Helston Water and Hugus)
- OS grid reference: SW 810 427
- Civil parish: Kea
- Unitary authority: Cornwall
- Ceremonial county: Cornwall
- Region: South West
- Country: England
- Sovereign state: United Kingdom
- Post town: TRURO
- Postcode district: TR3
- Dialling code: 01872
- Police: Devon and Cornwall
- Fire: Cornwall
- Ambulance: South Western
- UK Parliament: South East Cornwall

Kea (/kiː/ KEE; Cornish: Sen Ke) is a civil parish and village in Cornwall, England, United Kingdom. It is a "large straggling parish" in a former mining area south of Truro.

Kea village is situated just over one mile (1.6 km) southwest of Truro.

Old Kea is situated two miles (3 km) to the east on the west bank of the Truro River at grid reference SW 843 417. St Kea reputedly landed at Old Kea on his first visit to Cornwall and established a church there, which was the parish church until replaced by All Hallows. His life is described in the medieval Cornish language play Bewnans Ke (The Life of St Kea, c. 1550).

Today, the parish is mainly agricultural, and is noted for giving its name to the damson-type Kea plum. It is bounded to the north by Calenick Creek and Truro civil parish; to the east by the Truro River and River Fal; to the south by the parishes of Feock, Perranarworthal and Gwennap; and to the west by Kenwyn. Other settlements in the parish include Calenick, Come-to-Good, Killiow, Nansavallan, Playing Place, Porth Kea, and the tiny hamlet of Quenchwell consisting of a few houses and a chapel. It takes its name from the Quench-well, a natural spring.

Kea was described in 1870–72, John Marius Wilson's Imperial Gazetteer of England and Wales (1870) as:

A parish and a sub-district in Truro district, Cornwall. The parish lies on the Falmouth and Redruth railways, 2¼ miles SSW of Truro; is bounded, on the E, by the river Fal, on the N, by Kenwyn, on the W, by Gwennap; and contains parts of the chapelries of Baldhu, Chacewater, and Mithian. Real property £7,158 of which £1,234 are in mines. Pop(ulation) in 1861 3,949. Houses, 824. The manor belongs to Viscount Falmouth.

== Churches and schools ==
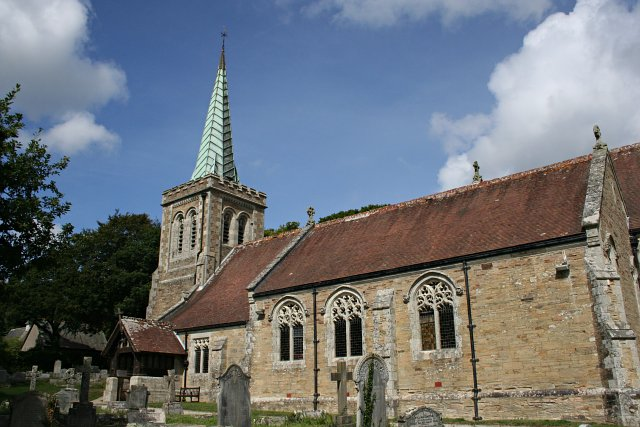
Kea parish church

All Hallows church is in Kea village at grid reference SW 809 426. It was built in 1895 by the prolific Victorian church architect George Fellowes Prynne to replace a church of 1802 which was the work of James Wyatt. The church has a steep tiled roof and a lead spire. The font is Norman and of the Altarnun type. This present church was consecrated 4 June 1896. The altar, the work of George Fellowes Prynne, has decorated panels designed by the architect's brother, the leading late Pre-Raphaelite painter, Edward Arthur Fellowes Prynne.

The church of St Kea at Old Kea was the parish church until All Hallows was built. Later, the church at Old Kea was pulled down and only the tower remains today. A small chapel now stands beside the ruined medieval tower and services are held there twice a month

Kea Monastery was a monastery probably located at Kea of which almost nothing is known: "The mysterious land-owning monastery of St Cheus mentioned in Domesday (in Powder), 1085, possibly refers to Kea."

There is a school in the parish, Kea Community Primary School, which caters for 200 pupils aged between 4 and 11 years. The school stands at a crossroads half-a-mile (1 km) east of Kea village at SW 818 425

== Houses ==
At Calenick and Killiow are 18th-century houses of two storeys. Calenick House contains remains of a much older building; it is of seven bays and there is a separate clock tower with a cupola, dated 1752. Killiow House is somewhat later and was extended c. 1850. The latter was once the home of Theophila Gwatkin (née Palmer; 1757–1848) and Robert Lovell Gwatkin (1757–1843).

A Quaker Meeting House opened in Come-to-Good, Kea, in 1710, and is still in use today.

== Cornish wrestling ==
Cornish wrestling tournaments, for prizes were held in Kea in the 1800s. An example would be a tournament held at the school sports day on 15 July 1863 at St Kea church.

== Notable people ==
- Margaret Steuart Pollard, writer, Cornish bard and resident of Quenchwell

== Gallery ==
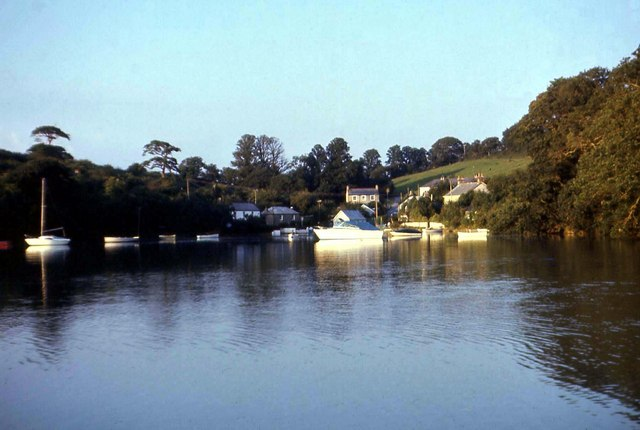
Coombe, Kea, the home of Kea plums

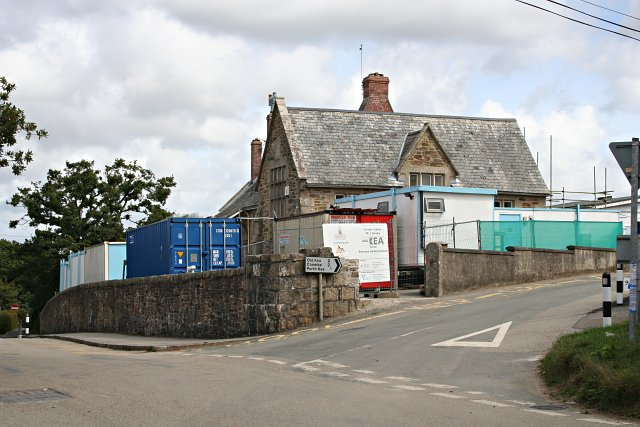
Kea Community Primary School buildings being extended in 2006

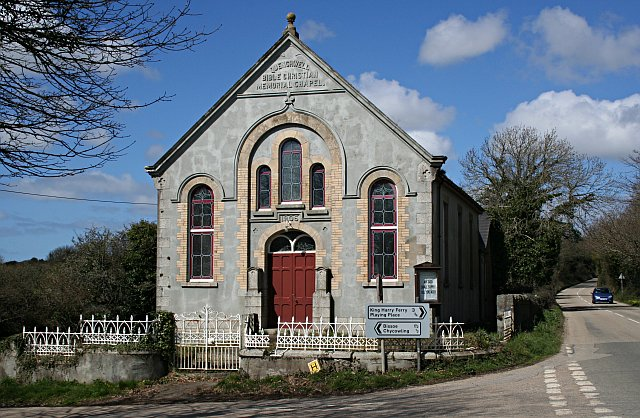
Quenchwell Bible Christian Memorial Chapel
