= Mary Peisley =

Irish Quaker

Mary Peisley (1718-1757, married name Mary Neale, sometimes misspelled Paisley) was an Irish Quaker writer.

== Biography ==
Peisley was born 19 January 1718 at Ballymore, County Kildare: her mother Rachel (née Burton) was from Mannin, County Tipperary, and her father John from Baltiboys, County Wicklow. The family moved in 1723 to a farm at Paddock, Mountrath, County Laois (then known as "Queen's County"), where she was based for the rest of her life until her marriage. She had little formal education and entered domestic service, until at the age of 26 she began to speak at Quaker meetings.

Peisley preached around Ireland with Elizabeth Tomey in 1746, and toured England in 1748-50, riding 5,000 miles (8,000 km) in 29 months and attending 525 meetings. She toured Ireland again in 1751.

At an annual London meeting, she, Catherine Payton and four others proposed that a separate women's group should be formed with the Quakers. This was accepted, but not until 1784.

Peisley travelled to America in 1753-1756 with Catherine Payton. They rode 8,000 miles (13,000 km) "often through thinly inhabited country, braving dangerous creeks, swamps, and wild animals", visiting North and South Carolina, Virginia, Maryland, New England, and Pennsylvania. During their tour Peisley noted a "low state of discipline" among Quakers in America, and saw a need for reformation. Her letters and records of this journey "were to be seen 70 years later as prophesying the separations that took place within the Religious Society of Friends in 1827 and 1828".

Peisley spoke against slavery and held meetings with African Americans, writing to Quakers in Virginia in 1754 that "one thing the friends here ... were in the practice of, which gave us considerable pain ... that is, buying and keeping of slaves which we could not reconcile with the golden rule of doing unto all men as we would they should do unto us".

On 17 March 1757 at Mountrath she married Samuel Neale (1729-1792), who had first heard her preach in Cork in about 1750 and had subsequently become a Quaker minister. She died three days later of "cholic" and is buried in the Quaker cemetery at Mountrath. Her widower Samuel assembled and published a collection of her writings.

== Selected publications ==
- Neale, Samuel, ed. (1795). Some account of the life and religious exercises of Mary Neale, formerly Mary Peisley. Principally compiled from her own writings. Dublin: J. Gough.
