= Friends Meeting House, Come-to-Good =

Quaker meeting house in Come-to-Good, Cornwall, England

Friends Meeting House
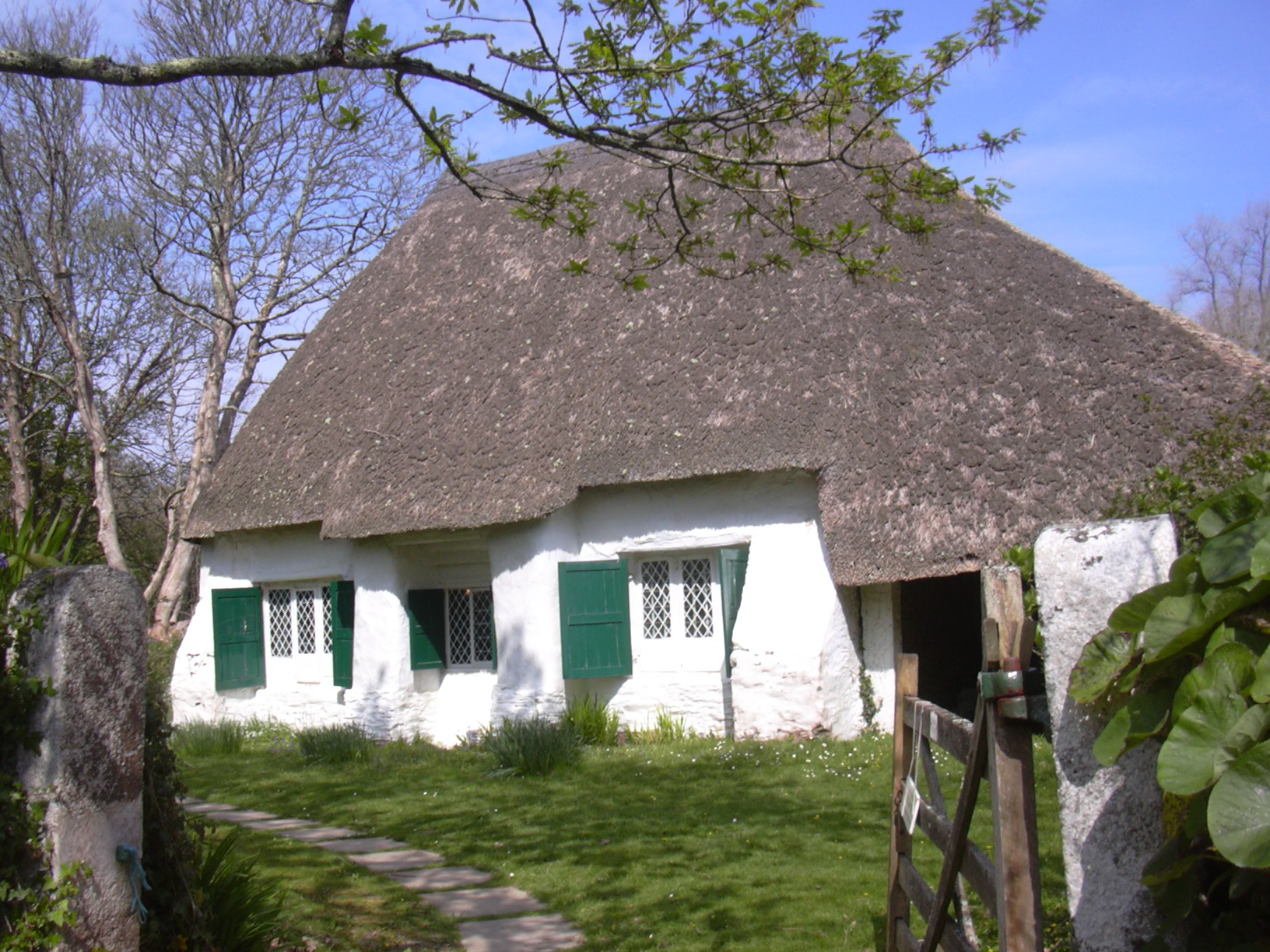

- Location within Cornwall
- 50.2224°N 5.0676°W
- Location: Come-to-Good, Kea, Cornwall, England

History
- Built: 1710

Listed Building – Grade I
- Designated: 30 May 1967
- Reference no.: 1140860

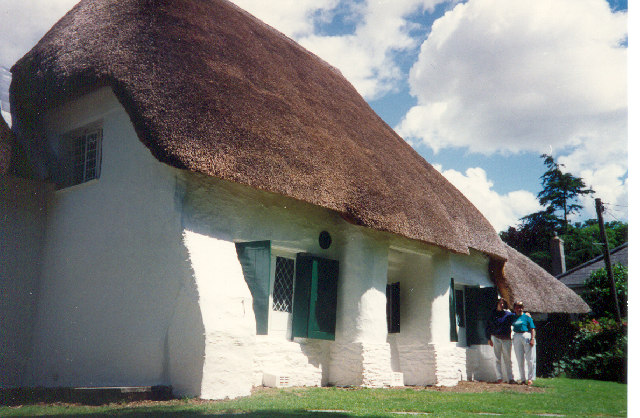
Come-to-Good Meeting House in 1993

The Friends Meeting House is a meeting house of the Society of Friends (Quakers), in the hamlet of Come-to-Good on the southern border of the parish of Kea, near Truro in Cornwall. It was also known as Kea Meeting House and Feock Meeting House. It is a simple thatched structure built of cob and whitewashed outside and in. It was completed in 1710 and is still in use today.

== History ==
George Fox, the founder of the Religious Society of Friends, commonly known as the Quakers, came to Cornwall in 1656. He was arrested several times for blasphemy because his ideas were at odds with mainstream Christianity at the time. However people wanted to hear what he had to say and a group met regularly from 1680. They wanted a simple place in which to meet, and built a cob-and-thatch meeting house.

== The name - is it fundamentally connected to the Quaker Meeting House? ==
Emma Roberts, a Welsh speaking Quaker from Swansea, south Wales, visited in May 2026, and proposed a new theory. The Welsh phrase "Cwm Ty Cwrdd", meaning Meeting House Valley, would be spoken by an English speaker as something like Come to Good. On her Youtube channel Quakerology she has posted some explanations of the name. https://youtube.com/shorts/gHcrJDQIsFU?feature=share

In a longer video, Emma Roberts finds that Peter Pool's Introduction to Cornish Place names shows that the usage of "Ty" for house (rather than Chy) in older styles of Kernowek was established.[3]

But perhaps it is not Cornish but simply from the Welsh? Is this proposal at all feasible? Was there a Welsh connection or resident? Is there a reason why the unusual name is so coincidentally similar to the Welsh phrase?

Full video here https://www.youtube.com/watch?v=EnoWC0H_1Tc

== The meeting house ==
The meeting house is a Grade I Listed building. From 30 May 1967 until 14 April 1999, it was Grade II*. The building is in cob, on a stone rubble base and was completed in 1710.

The exterior and interior walls are whitewashed and the simple pews around the walls face onto a central table. There is a gallery or stand at one end from which the meeting could be addressed. The meeting room is unadorned but has wooden panelling and wooden pillars to support the gallery. The roof structure can be seen above and the underside of the thatch. The glass in the windows is thought to be older than the building, having been recycled from another building.

A single-storey extension for an entrance lobby, kitchen and lavatories was built in 1967. Both the main building and the lobby are thatched. There was a major restoration and re-thatching in 2010. The building is still in regular use, with a Quaker worship meeting every Sunday morning.

There is a burial ground but only five headstones, all belonging to members of the Magor family, who died in the 19th century. It is the burial place of Catherine Payton Phillips.
