= Mary Palmer =

English writer

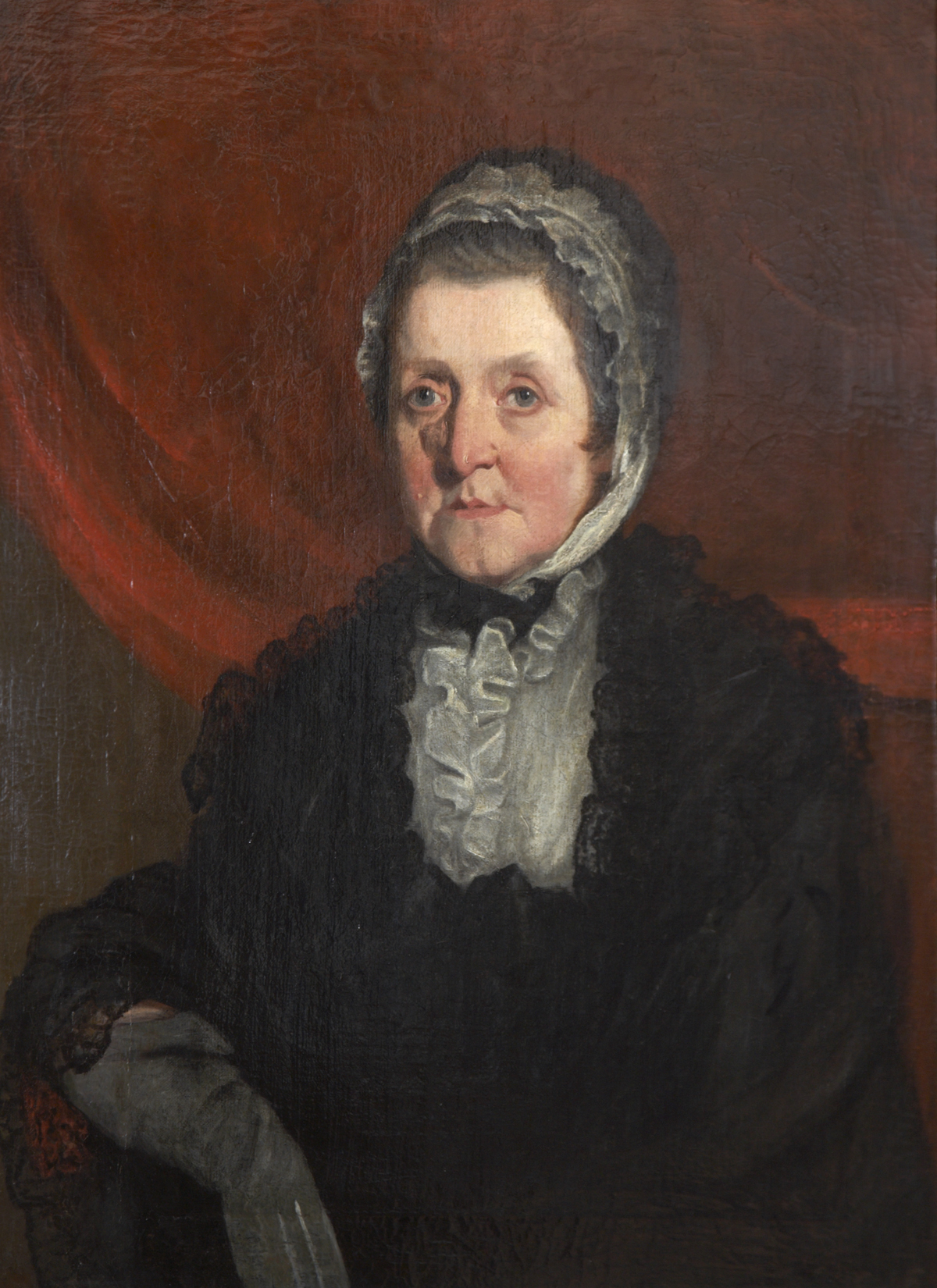
Mrs Mary Palmer, by her brother Sir Joshua Reynolds (d.1792). Collection of Plymouth City Council, Plymouth City Museum and Art Gallery, PLYMG.CO.15

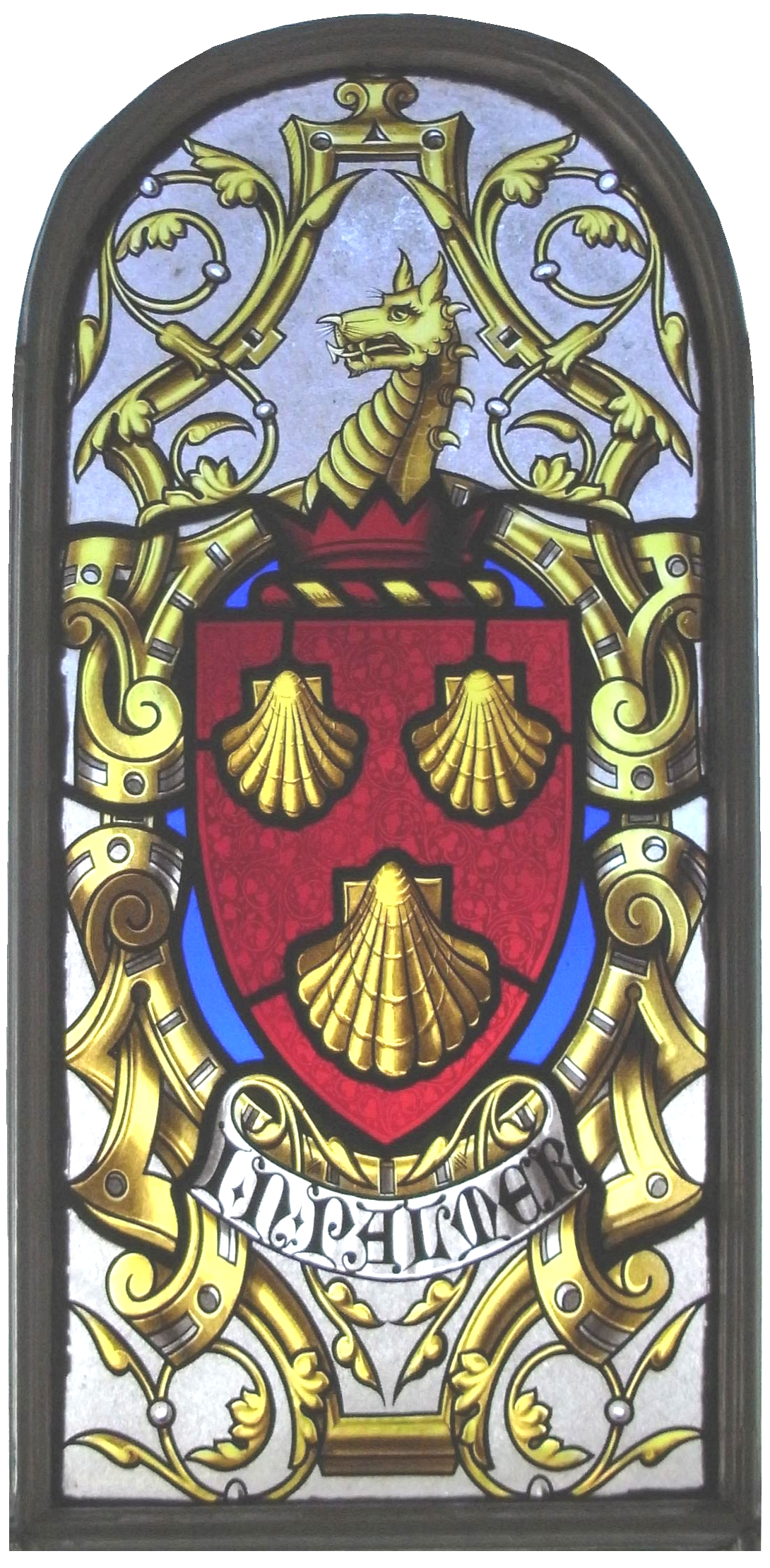
Stained glass in Palmer House, Great Torrington, showing arms of John Palmer (Note: Arms of John Palmer: "Gules, three escallops", with crest: "A wyvern's head and neck couped", with inscription below: "J N Palmer". A palmer was an old term for pilgrim, and pilgrims to the shrine of St James at Compostella, Spain, distinguished themselves by wearing a scallop shell, the symbol of that saint)

Mary Palmer (née Reynolds; 9 February 1716 – 27 May 1794) was a British author from Devon who wrote Devonshire Dialogue, once considered the "best piece of literature in the vernacular of Devon." She was the mother of painter Theophila Gwatkin and sister of the artists Sir Joshua Reynolds and Frances Reynolds and of the pamphleteer Elizabeth Johnson.

== Origins ==
Mary was the eldest daughter and third child of Samuel Reynolds (1681–1745), master of the Plympton Earl grammar school, Devonshire, by his wife, Theophila Potter (1688–1756). She was seven years older than her brother Joshua Reynolds and her fondness for drawing is said to have influenced him when a boy. In 1740 she provided £60, half of the premium paid to Thomas Hudson the portrait-painter, for Joshua's pupilage, and 9 years later advanced money for his expenses in Italy. Joshua Reynolds painted two portraits of his sister Mary, one made about 1747, the other when she was aged about 60 years of age. Both portraits descended to her great-grandson, George Stawell of Great Torrington.

Their other siblings included the artist Frances Reynolds and Elizabeth Johnson.

== Devonshire Dialogue ==
Mary Palmer was the author of Devonshire Dialogue, considered by the Dictionary of National Biography in 1895 to be the "best piece of literature in the vernacular of Devon". It gives an account of the customs, characters and dialect unique to western England. Written in the middle of the 18th century, it was shown to friends and extracts were published in periodicals during her lifetime, without being attributed to her. A portion appeared in 1837 with a glossary by her grandson James Frederick Palmer (1803–1871), son of John Palmer. A complete version was edited by her daughter Theophila Gwatkin in 1839, and another edition was published in 1869.

== Marriage ==
On 18 July 1740 Mary Reynolds married John Palmer (1708–1779) of Great Torrington, Devonshire, a lawyer (Note: The Dictionary of National Biographies article states that Palmer never practised, however, the article on the Johnson Society website states that Palmer was a successful lawyer.) who served thrice as Mayor of Great Torrington. In 1752 he built a house in Great Torrington now known as Palmer House, and it was there that Dr. Samuel Johnson stayed with the Palmers when visiting Devon with Sir Joshua Reynolds.

== Children ==
John and Mary Palmer had five children, two sons and three daughters:

- Joseph Palmer (1749–1829), Dean of Cashel, and author of A Four Months' Tour in France. He resided at Beam House, Great Torrington.
- John Palmer (1752–1827), Honorary Canon of Lincoln Cathedral
- Mary II Palmer (1750–1820), who together with her sister Offy spent much time in London with their uncle, Sir Joshua Reynolds. He had great affection for them, painted their portraits, and bequeathed Mary nearly £100,000 in his will. In 1792 she married Murrough O'Brien, 5th Earl of Inchiquin (1726–1808), later 1st Marquess of Thomond. Mary died without issue in 1820 and left as her heir her brother John Palmer.
- Theophila ('Offy') Palmer (1757–1848) married in 1781 Robert Lovell Gwatkin of Killiow, Cornwall. (Note: Maria Edgeworth (1768–1849) described Robert Lovell Gwatkin as a true "Roast Beef of old England, king and constitution man". The same writer, in a letter dated 29 March 1831, thus spoke of Mrs. Gwatkin: "She has been very pretty, and, though deaf, is very agreeable—enthusiastically and affectionately fond of her uncle — indignant at the idea of his not having himself written the Discourses – "Burke or Johnson. No such thing — he wrote them himself. I am evidence, he used to employ me as his secretary".) (Note: The novelist Fanny Burney often met the Palmer sisters at Sir Joshua's house in London, and recorded in her Diary: "The Miss Palmers added to the grace of his table and of his evening circles by their pleasing manners and the beauty of their persons...The eldest Miss Palmer seems to have a better understanding than Offy, but Offy has the most pleasing face".)
- Elizabeth Palmer (1758–1784) married William Salkeld at Great Torrington, Devon, on 26 April 1781.
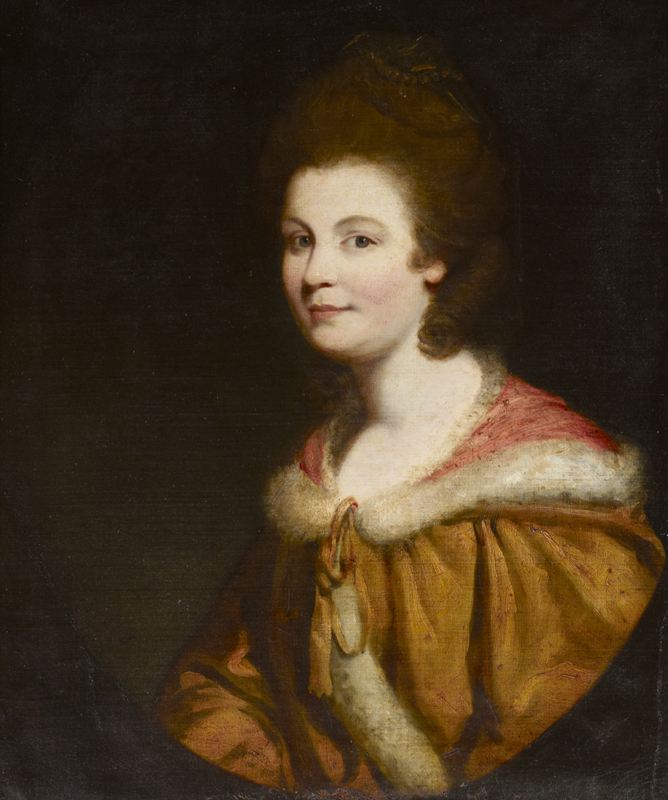
Mary O'Brien, Countess of Inchiquin, by Thomas Phillips after original by Sir Joshua Reynolds, Petworth House, Sussex

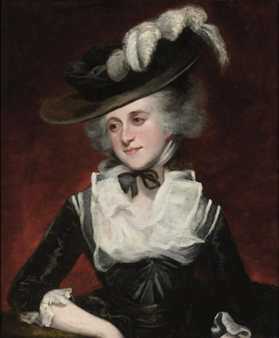
Mary O'Brien, Countess of Inchiquin, painted before 1785 by her uncle Sir Joshua Reynolds. Collection of Fairfax House, City of York.

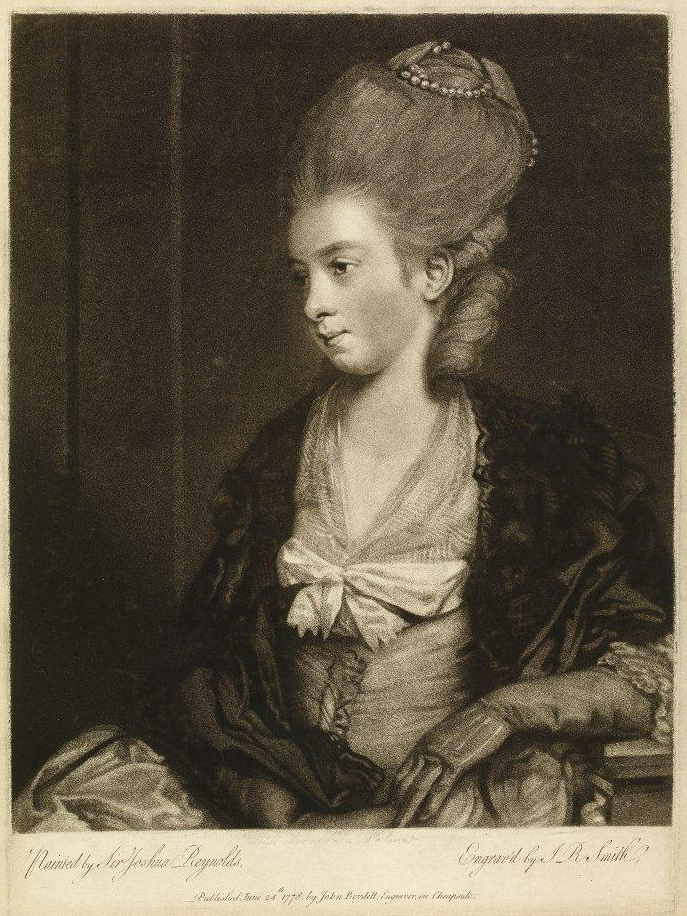
Theophila Palmer, mezzotint by John Raphael Smith of original by Sir Joshua Reynolds, published 1778, British Museum, 2006, U.214

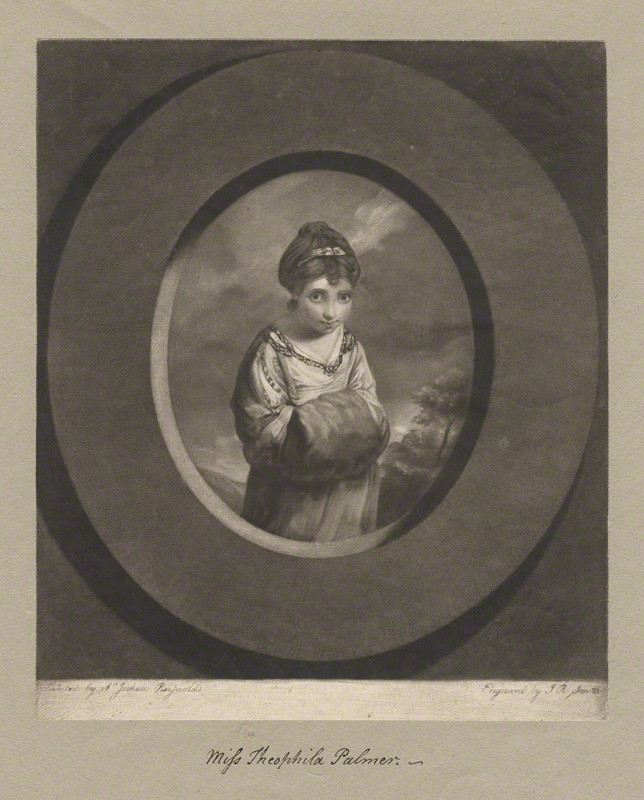
Theophila Palmer, mezzotint by John Raphael Smith of original by Sir Joshua Reynolds. 1767, published 1777, National Portrait Gallery, London, NPG D2540.
