= Elizabeth Johnson (pamphleteer) =

English pamphleteer

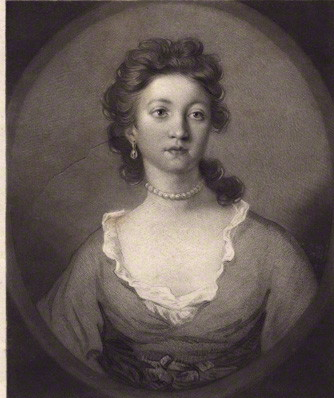
- Elizabeth Johnson by Samuel William Reynolds
- Born: Elizabeth Reynolds; 8 July 1721; Plympton, Devon, England
- Died: 14 May 1800 (aged 78); Great Torrington, Devon, England
- Occupation: Pamphlet writer
- Spouse: William Johnson
- Children: 7
- Parents: Rev. Samuel Reynolds (father); Theophilia Reynolds (mother)

Elizabeth Johnson, née Reynolds (8 July 1721 – 14 May 1800), was an English pamphleteer who attempted to win one of the rewards offered by the 1714 Longitude Act passed, which offered monetary rewards for anyone who could find a simple and practical method for the precise determination of a ship's longitude. Johnson and Jane Squire are the only two women known to have made such an attempt as it was not considered an appropriate subject for early modern women especially given its financial, maritime and government dimensions.

== Early background ==
She was born to the Rev. Samuel Reynolds (1681–1745) and his wife Theophilia (1688–1756) in Plympton, Devon. Among her siblings was the acclaimed artist Sir Joshua Reynolds, who used her as a model for works which were widely copied in mezzotint. The two would later quarrel over Joshua's lack of piety and over her husband's precarious financial situation and eventual bankruptcy.

Other siblings included the author Mary Palmer and painter Frances Reynolds.

== Publications ==
Johnson's religious pamphlets, beginning with The Explication of the Vision to Ezekiel in 1781, were written anonymously – likely to evade any criticism of women publishing or expressing religious ideas. One critic sarcastically commented on her earlier works in 1783: "As the intentions of this writer are pious, his facilities evidently disordered, and his lucubrations absolutely unintelligible, these three pamphlets must be exempted from criticism". William Johnson Cory later revealed the true identity of the pamphlets' author in a handwritten inscription on one of the Bodleian Library's copies of the Ezekiel pamphlet: "This strange book was written by my great-grandmother Mrs. Johnson, sister of Sir Joshua Reynolds. When extremely poor she posted up to Oxford to get it published, being a real enthusiast".

== Longitude ==
The Astronomy and Geography of the Created World, her fourth pamphlet published in 1785, included a short reference to longitude. The pamphlet ended with the claim "that if the palm for finding the longitude, is not given to the author of the Explanation of the Vision to Ezikiel it will never be given to another". The modern attribution of the Ezekiel pamphlet to Johnson has only recently revealed that the author of the 1785 work was a rare female longitude-seeker, as she even remained anonymous when sending it to the Board of Longitude in 1786 in the hope of a reward. She was unsuccessful, and the pamphlet and letter were later catalogued by the Astronomer Royal George Airy in a volume of Board of Longitude correspondence which he entitled Irrational Astronomical Theories in 1858. However, it was not the only early modern pamphlet to address both religion and longitude.

Elizabeth Johnson died in Great Torrington, Devon in 1800.
