= Jane Squire =

English mathematician and feminist

- Born: c. 1686; York, England
- Died: 1743; London, England
- Occupation: Mathematician

Jane Squire (bap. 1686 – 1743) was an English mathematician who was the only known woman to have participated openly in the 18th-century debates and discussions over the solution to finding longitude at sea. She was one of only two (the other being Elizabeth Johnson) who submitted schemes with the aim of receiving a reward (up to £20,000) under the 1714 Longitude Act. This work was especially important during the 18th century, when the British Empire depended heavily on the sea for trade, travel, and governing colonies.

== Life and career ==
Squire was born in York and baptised in 1686. Her parents, Priscilla and Robert Squire, were wealthy and influential. Squire moved to London in 1720. In 1722, she sued Edward Harley, 2nd Earl of Oxford and Earl Mortimer and Thomas Lord Harley over losing significant financial investments, which was unusual for women in that era. The lawsuit was dropped after courts determined that her Catholic faith allowed courts to bar her suit.

In 1726, Squire was arrested and put in jail (Fleet Prison) for her significant debts. She was released three years later and chose to focus on her longitude proposal, which was influenced by her Catholic faith.

In London, she used her influential connections to pursue her religiously-based longitude project and the circulation of her book, A Proposal to Determine our Longitude (two editions, 1742 and 1743). She also sent copies to Rome in the hope of gaining the support of Pope Benedict XIV.

Squire was never married. She was determined to have her ideas heard, despite being a woman. She included in her book a letter that she wrote to Sir Thomas Hanmer in 1733 in which she stated, "‘I do not remember any Play-thing, that does not appear to me a mathematical Instrument; nor any mathematical Instrument, that does not appear to me a Play-thing: I see not, therefore, why I should confine myself to Needles, Cards, and Dice". Hanmer was one of the original Commissioners appointed by the 1714 Longitude Act and his response, also printed in Squire's book, indicated that "‘that you are to expect to lye under some Prejudice upon account of your Sex". Although her project was impractical, she gained the ear of a number of influential individuals, including Hans Sloane and Abraham de Moivre. She remained convinced to the end that she deserved a reward for her work. An obituary in the Daily Post referred to her as “a Lady excellently well vers’d in Astronomy, Philosophy, and most Parts of polite Literature”.

== Longitude proposal ==
Squire's proposals to determine longitude at sea drew on contemporary astronomy and other learned traditions, as well as heavily depending on her religious world view. Her books outlined a scheme that involved dividing the heavens into more than a million segments as well as a sidereal clock fixed to the position of the Star of Bethlehem at the birth of Jesus. Similarly religiously motivated searches were "not uncommon" at the time. The clock was intended to announce the time from church steeples, and she also discussed the use of marine buoys (described as artificial sea creatures) to aid mapping.

Squire's publication, A Proposal to Determine Our Longitude, was printed in two editions. It was printed in London was sold by S. Cope and other London booksellers. The 1742 edition, 200 pages long, was printed in English and French. The 1743 edition was 160 pages long. The books feature a fold-out summary chart folded into the front. The book includes a table of contents, her proposal, reprints of letters exchanged from 1731 to 1742.

When Pope Benedict XIV received Squire's communication he asked the Bologna Academy of Sciences to assess it. Their response was not positive, although they did indicate that women should be encouraged to study mathematical sciences. Squire's work was not considered within any of the minuted meetings of the British Board of Longitude and in the 20th century it was dismissed as one of the many "nutty solutions" circulating at the time. More recently, scholars have started to take her contribution, and the responses of her contemporaries, more seriously in order to better understand the scientific and religious cultures of the period, and the importance of gender and social class in gaining a voice in debates.

== Death ==
Squire died in London in 1743, the year the second edition of her proposal was published. The Daily Post noted that she was “a Lady excellently well vers’d in Astronomy, Philosophy, and most Parts of polite Literature".

== See also ==
- Taylor, E.G.R. (1962). "Four Steps to Longitude". Journal of Navigation. 15 (3): 257–261. doi:10.1017/S0373463300042600. S2CID 131128409.
- Dunn, Richard; Higgitt, Rebekah (2014). Finding longitude: how clocks and stars helped solve the longitude problem. Collins. ISBN 978-0007525867.
