= Come-to-Good =

Coordinates: 50.2222°N 5.0675°W

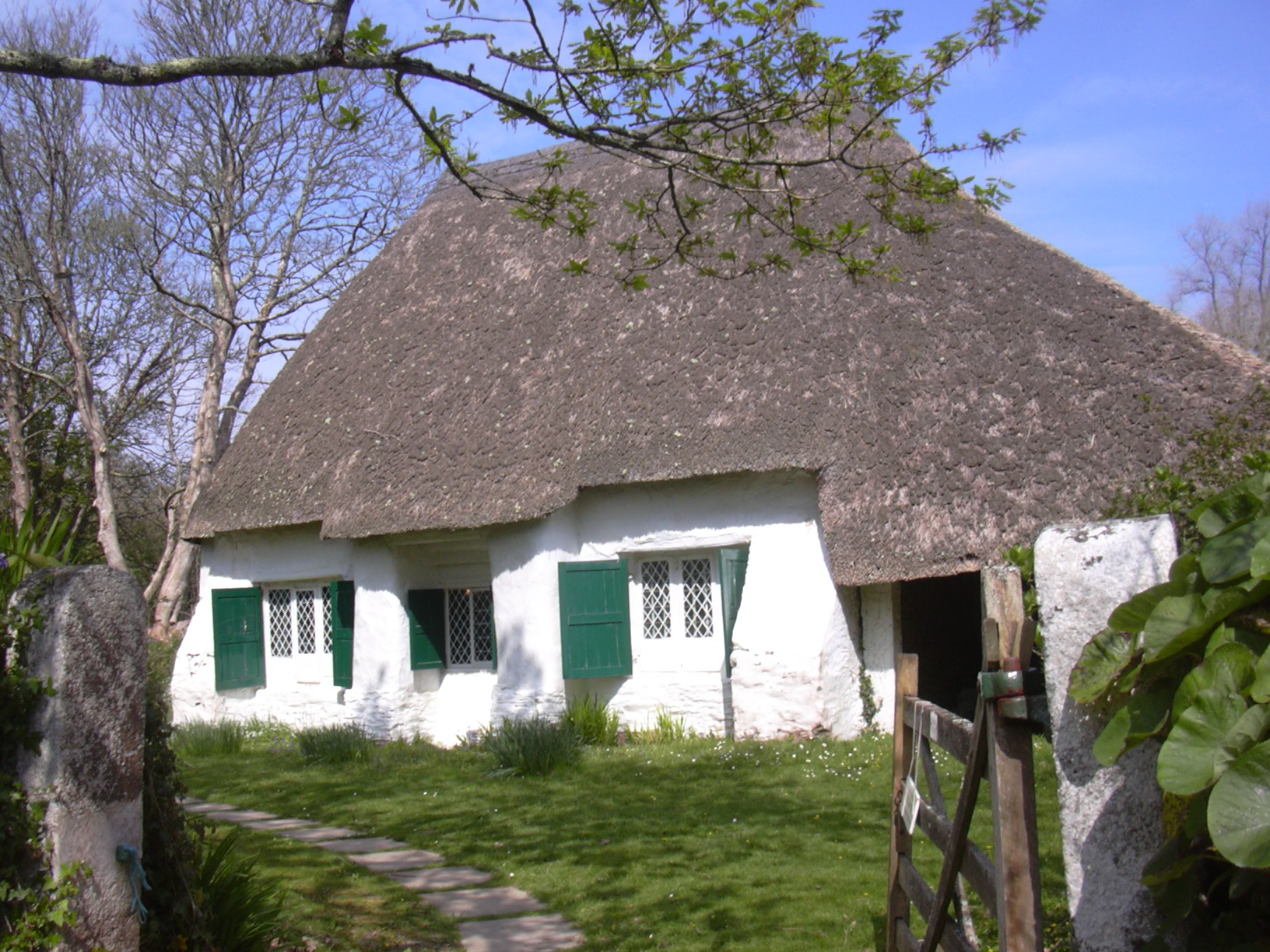
- Quaker Meeting House at Come-to-Good

- Location within Cornwall
- Population: 10
- OS grid reference: SW8138140321
  - London: 232 miles (373 km) ENE
- Civil parish: On the border of Feock and Kea
- Unitary authority: Cornwall
- Ceremonial county: Cornwall
- Region: South West
- Country: England
- Sovereign state: United Kingdom
- Post town: TRURO
- Postcode district: TR3
- Dialling code: 01872
- Police: Devon and Cornwall
- Fire: Cornwall
- Ambulance: South Western
- UK Parliament: Truro and Falmouth

Come-to-Good is a small settlement in Cornwall, England, United Kingdom.

It consists of a farm, seven residential houses and a Quaker Meeting House, built in 1710. It lies on the Tregye Road between Carnon Downs and King Harry Ferry. The boundary between Feock parish to the south and Kea parish to the north runs along the Tregye Road, south of the Meeting House and its burial ground and curves northward to the west, along the path of the stream and to the east, along the track to Penelewey. The Tregye Campus of Truro College is nearby.

== The Name ==
Patricia Griffith says "There has been much discussion about the origins of such a delightful name and for some time it was thought it derived from the supposed Cornish Cwm-ty-coit meaning "the coombe by the dwelling in the wood". However this derivation has never been felt to be totally satisfactory and recent research by Dr Oliver Padel has discovered that the name "Come to Good" is not found as a name for the area until fairly late in the seventeenth century, after the arrival of the meeting. He now argues that it is much more likely to be an ironical reference to Friends and the Meeting."

Emma Roberts, a Welsh speaking Quaker from Swansea, south Wales, visited in May 2026, and proposed a new theory. The Welsh phrase "Cwm Ty Cwrdd", meaning Meeting House Valley, would be spoken by an English speaker as something like Come to Good.
