= Palmer House, Great Torrington =

Building in Great Torrington, Devon, England

Coordinates: 50°57′10.08″N 4°8′41.64″W

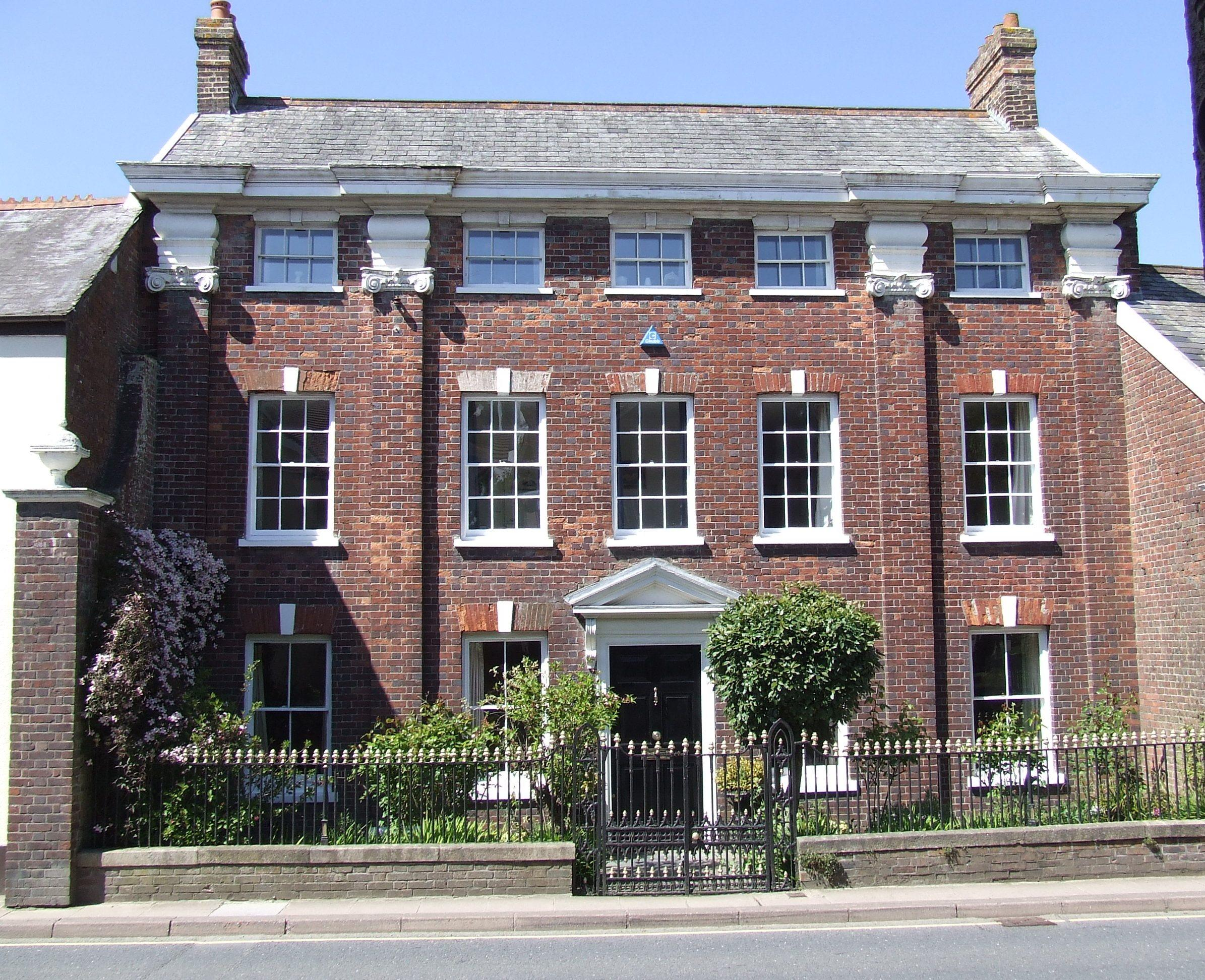
Palmer House, Great Torrington, Devon. in 2013

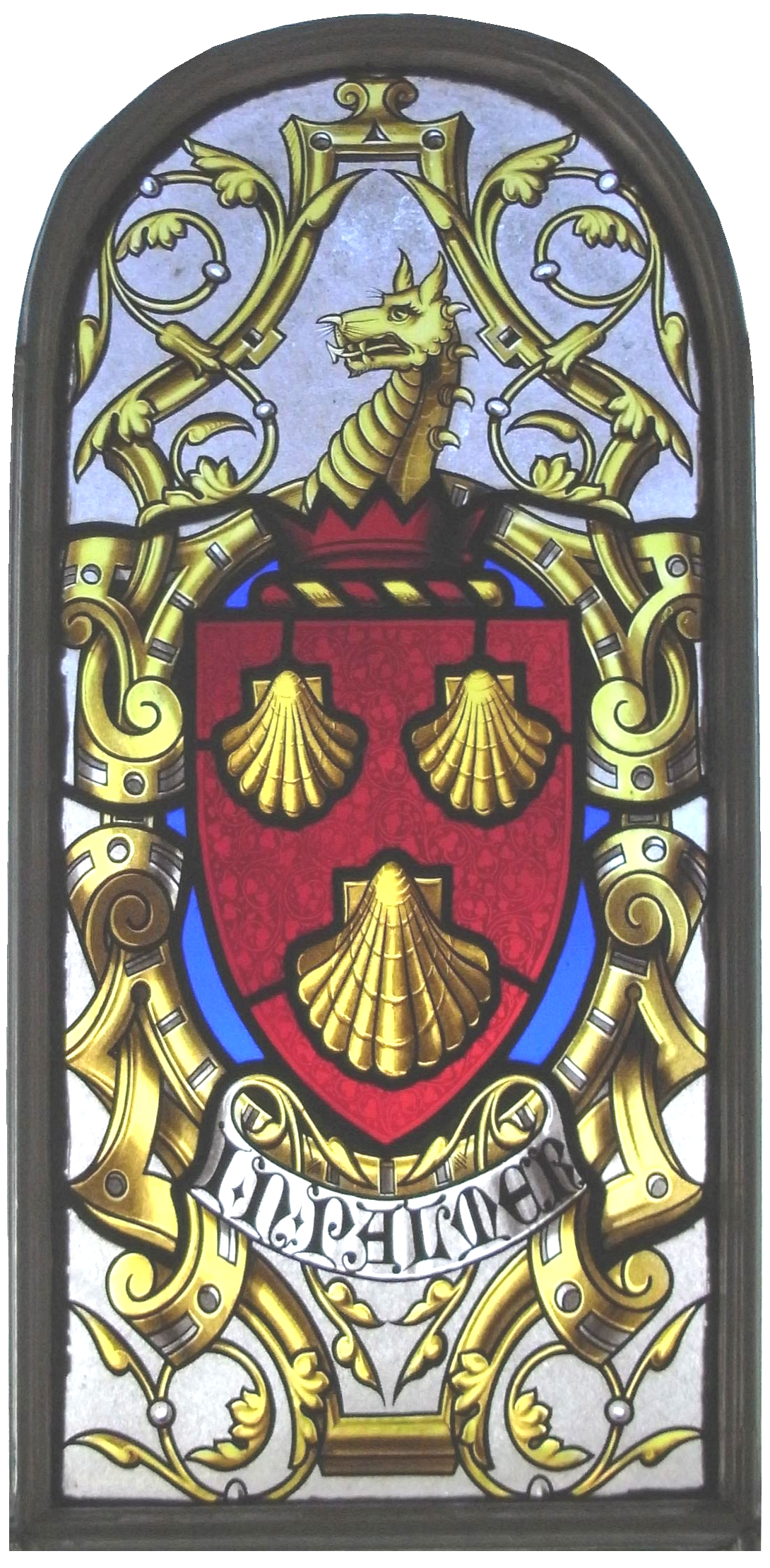
Stained glass in Palmer House, Great Torrington, showing arms of John Palmer (Note: Arms of John Palmer: "Gules, three escallops", with crest: "A wyvern's head and neck couped", with inscription below: "J N Palmer". A palmer was an old term for pilgrim, and pilgrims to the shrine of St James at Compostella, Spain, distinguished themselves by wearing a scallop shell, the symbol of that saint)

Palmer House is a grade II* listed Georgian residence built in 1752 in the town of Great Torrington, North Devon, England. It is notable as it retains many original features, including fine ornate plaster ceilings, marble and carved fireplaces, mahogany doors and a fine balustraded staircase.

== History ==
Palmer House was built in 1752 by John Palmer, three times Mayor of Great Torrington and husband of Mary Reynolds, the author of Devonshire Dialogue and eldest sister of the artist Sir Joshua Reynolds, both brought up at Plympton in South Devon, who painted the portraits of his Palmer nieces. The house remained in the ownership of the Palmer family until the 1890s.

== Visitors ==
Many famous people visited and stayed at the house. Sir Joshua Reynolds, brother-in-law of the builder, was a regular visitor. Dr. Samuel Johnson, a friend of Sir Joshua Reynolds, stayed at the house in 1762. Admiral Lord Horatio Nelson, who had relatives in the area, is also known to have visited Palmer House.

== Description ==
The house is a three-storied building with the front facade made of red brick with Ionic pilasters. In the late 18th century a wing was added to the back of the house. A gazebo formerly in the rear garden is now located at Rosemoor Gardens in the same town. The first floor has a plaster ceiling with Palmer arms and Ionic mantel. The Palmer arms are represented in stained glass on the half-landing of the staircase.

Nikolaus Pevsner called it the "best house in town". It has also been described as "a most interesting example of brickwork subordinated to a Palladian treatment of pilasters and cornice".
