= Frances Reynolds (artist) =

British artist (1729–1807)

Frances Reynolds (6 June 1729 – 1 November 1807 London) was a British artist, and the youngest sister of Sir Joshua Reynolds.

== Life ==
She was born in 1729 and later kept Sir Joshua's house for many years after he came to London, and employed herself in miniature and other painting. But when her nieces, the Misses Palmer, were old enough to take her place, she (some point before 15 February 1779) left his house forever. The separation from her brother caused her lasting regret.

Her brother made her an allowance, and she went first to Devon; and then, in 1768, to stay with a Miss Flint in Paris, where Reynolds visited her. She later lived as a lodger of Dr. John Hoole, whose portrait, prefixed to the first edition of his translation of Ariosto, was painted by her.

On her brother's death in 1792 she took a large house in Queen Square, London, where she exhibited her own works, and where she died, unmarried, on 1 November 1807.

Their other siblings included Mary Palmer and Elizabeth Johnson.

== Works ==
Of her work, Sir Joshua, speaking of the copies which she made of his pictures, says " "they make other people laugh and me cry;" but a letter of James Northcote's says that "she paints very fine, both history and portrait." Samuel Johnson, who was very fond of her, and visited her in Dover Street, where she was living by herself in 1780, was not pleased with the portrait she made of himself in 1783, and called it his "grimly ghost."

On her literary work Johnson held mixed opinions. He was complimentary about her ‘Essay on Taste’ (privately printed, 1784). However, of her ‘Enquiry Concerning the Principles of Taste and of the Origins of Our Ideas of Beauty’(1785) he appears more critical of her reasoning. In the latter work, Reynolds writes:

The negro-race seems to be the farthest removed from the line of true cultivation of any of the human species; their defect of form and complexion being I imagine as strong an obstacle to their acquiring true taste (the produce of mental cultivation) as any natural defect, they may have in their intellectual faculties, for if as I have observed, the total ones of cultivation would preclude external beauty. The total want of beauty would preclude the power of cultivation. It appears to me to be inconceivable that the negro-race supposing their mental powers were on a level with other nations, could ever arrive at true taste, when their eye is accustomed only to objects so diametrically opposed to taste as the face and form of Negroes are!

Johnson, an outspoken critic of slavery on moral and philosophical grounds, commented on a draft of Reynolds's text, “Many of your notions seem not very clear in your own mind.” (Ibid.) Johnson, notably, was also a strong supporter of Francis Barber, his Jamaican manservant whom he educated and named his heir.

All his letters to her and about her show interest in his ‘Renny dear.’ He left her a book as a legacy. She printed a ‘Melancholy Tale’ in verse in 1790.
