= Wheal Metal =

Former tin mine in west Cornwall, England

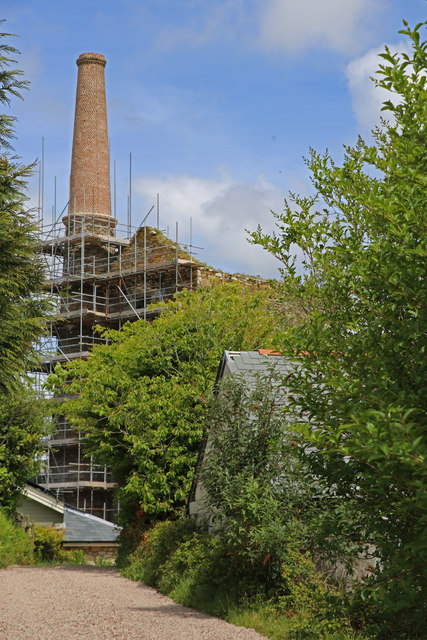

- Location in Cornwall
- Location: Breage, Cornwall, UK; 50°07′16″N 5°19′00″W
- Products: Tin
- Opened: 15th century
- Closed: c. 1877

Listed Building – Grade II
- Official name: Engine house at SW628298, Ivey's Shaft, Wheal Metal
- Designated: 26 August 1987
- Reference no.: 1158231

Listed Building – Grade II
- Official name: Engine house at SW623295, West Wheal Metal and Flow or Gold Hill Tine Mine
- Designated: 26 August 1987
- Reference no.: 1158216

Listed Building – Grade II
- Official name: Detached chimney at SW6232295, West Wheal Metal
- Designated: 26 August 1987
- Reference no.: 1158216

Wheal Metal is a tin-mining sett in west Cornwall, England, UK. Whilst not as famous as neighbouring Wheal Vor, it was thus described by the Mining Journal in July 1885: " Truly this is a wonderful mine—probably the richest tin mine in the world." It also hosts a very remarkable engine house of the mid-19th century that once stood over Trelawney's shaft on Wheal Vor, and since the Wheal Vor area itself has no visible remains, this is the only large surviving engine house of this group of mines which accounted for over a quarter of Cornish tin production in the mid-19th century.

== Geology ==
Around 290 to 280 million years ago rising plutons of granite intruded the native sedimentary rocks locally known as killas. Several of the domes formed were eventually exposed after their sedimentary coverings were eroded. Wheal Metal lies in the metamorphic area of two of the granitic hills thus exposed, Tregonning Hill and Godolphin Hill in the West of Cornwall. During the cooling periods that ensued, fractures opened in the granite and surrounding killas and provided a path for mineralising solutions to rise, and occupy the voids and enrich the surrounding rocks. Those mineral lodes vary in thickness from a few inches to several feet. Where the lodes outcrop on the surface, mineral-rich rocks were eroded and washed away in the streams, providing the early adventurers their first chance to recover the minerals exposed and locally accumulated in "placers". This is essentially a tin-producing sett with a limited output of arsenic, but little or no copper was extracted from it.

== Early history ==
Wheal Metal occupies the side of a valley drained by Sithney waters. Although no documented early history has survived, it is very likely the site was explored early on because of its ideal situation on the flank of the valley. The two known lodes intersect the stream at a 45-degree angle, providing ample opportunity for digging trenches into the sides of the hill. It is equally possible that a water-driven pump may have been in use, as suggested by the presence of a shaft now backfilled on the edge of the stream itself. The former pools upstream of the works, as well as an unnatural kink in the course of the stream and the remain of an old sluice gate, indicates past efforts to harness the power of water. The area is known as Poldown, the element "Pol" in Cornish names being often associated with pools.

== 1850 onwards ==
Wheal Metal's 19th-century exploitation is from the beginning linked to that of Wheal Vor's, and that in turn to the price of tin. The price of metallic tin peaked in 1811, 1857 and 1872, and each of those price peaks can be associated with documented activity at Wheal Metal undertaken for the most part by adventurers already involved with the working of Wheal Vor. In the early 1800s they sank a shaft and put a small engine over it. During the first part of the 19th century, four main shafts were sunk, Metal shaft, Old (or West) metal shaft, Edwards shaft, and Iveys's shaft. By 1848 at the time of the suspension of work at Wheal Vor one of its engines ( Bounder whim ) was moved to Old Metal shaft which reached depths of between 50 or 70 fathoms below adit, which, however, remains modest compared with the 236 fathoms reached at Wheal Vor, but nonetheless returned some rich parcels of tins. With the price of tin rising, the financial tangle which marked the end of the work at Wheal Vor was unwound, a new company was formed as Great Wheal Vor United which then acquired the sett of Wheal Metal in 1853 and continued to work its lodes deeper hitting rich deposits at 80 fathoms, and possibly starting work on a second adjacent lode named Schneider's lode in honour of the chairman of the company. In 1852 flat rods were taken from West Metal to Wheal Metal In 1855 a 26-inch whim was installed. This sett together with nearby Flow (also acquired in 1953) were the only source of income of the company, which was still putting all its resources into dewatering Wheal Vor. By October 1857, Wheal Vor had been dewatered only to find the promised riches were not materialising. Shareholders decided to carry on, however, as the returns of Wheal Metal were encouraging. In 1859 a 60-inch engine was installed to pump at Iveys shaft to allow the mine to reach deeper into the lode. By 1860, however, all hopes of fair returns on the Wheal Vor sett were abandoned and the engines put up for sale. No buyer having been found, it was decided to move the 85-inch pumping engine and steam whim that was over Trelawney's shaft to Iveys' shaft on Wheal Metal, where the 60-inch was still pumping. In order to disrupt the pumping and the extraction of the tin as little as possible, it was decided to build the engine house for the 85-inch at right angle to the 60-inch. The stones of the engine house at Trelawneys Wheal Vor were numbered according to J.Trounson, dismantled and reused to build the engine house at Iveys' shaft. In 1864 the 85 engine was then moved (the operations involved heavy carriages pulled by as many as 40 horses), erected in position, and inside 4 days the pumping rods were disconnected from the 60-inch engine and reconnected to the 80-inch with remarkably little interruption in pumping. By 1865 The Mining Journal was exclaiming "Truly this is a wonderful mine – probably the richest tin mine in the world". In 1868 Ivey's shaft was equipped with a 12-foot-stroke man-engine driven by a 30-inch Bull engine. The sett was returning 60 tons of black tin per month in the mid-1860s, and by 1867 it returned an average of 70/80 tons of black tin per month, which represented 10 per cent of the entire tin output of Cornwall for that year. Occasionally the mine would turn poor and was nearly abandoned, only to be revived by new discoveries. By 187, however, Ivey's shaft reached its final depth of 227 fathoms, and with falling ore grades and low tin prices, work finally stopped for good in the entire sett in 1874. In 1877 the company was wound up and the 85-inch engine sold to Newcastle and Gateshead waterworks' Wylam pumping station in Northumberland, where it survived until the 1940s.

== Wheal Metal today ==
A number of private properties share the original sett connected by a network of paths and lanes. The most visible of the remains is the superb engine house in excellent condition. A cast-iron pipe of fair diameter is visible at the intersection of two lanes a little to the north of the engine house, and points to the direction of where the dressing floor may have been next to a large heap of spoils several storeys high that stood there until sold off to the Navy for the foundations of one of the runways at nearby Culdrose Navy base. The sett is included in an area designated as a World Heritage Site, in recognition of the contribution of Cornish mining to the Industrial Revolution. This has gone hand in hand with a reappraisal of the archaeological importance of the remaining structures and landscapes, and its inclusion in the due processes of planning and development under "Planning Policy Statement 5: Planning for the historic environment" (2010). This latest document defines two important new concepts: 'heritage asset' and 'significance'. Wheal Metal must be considered as a significant asset both in terms of landscape and structural remains as it holds the only surviving structure of the Wheal Vor group of mines, which so dominated mid-19th-century tin mining in Cornwall.

== Sources ==
- The Cornish mineral Industry John H. Trounson Exeter University press 1989
- Exploring Cornish mines K.Brown and B.Acton volume 4
- Cornish Archaeology Golden Jubilee volume
- J. Trounson The Cornish mineral industry
- Cornish mining Bryan Earl Cornish Hillside publications
