= One Chun =

One Chun Cafe & Restaurant
- Native name: ร้านวันจันทร์
- Interactive map of One Chun

Restaurant information
- Established: circa 2010
- Owner: Napapat "Prang" Chessadawan
- Food type: Peranakan Chinese and Phuket
- Location: 48/1 Thep Krasatti Road Talat Yai, Mueang Phuket, Phuket, 83000, Thailand
- Coordinates: 7°53′8.8″N 98°23′26.6″E

One Chun Cafe & Restaurant (Thai: ร้านวันจันทร์, lit. 'Monday', RTGS: Wan Chan, pronounced [wān.tɕān]) is a Thai restaurant in Phuket. Opened circa 2010, the restaurant is located in Phuket Old Town in a 19th-century Sino-Portuguese building. It is owned by Napapat "Prang" Chessadawan, an antiques enthusiast, who furnished the restaurant with 1950s-era objects. One Chun's walls are decorated with black-and-white television devices, transistor radios, and antique clocks.

Featuring seafood and curries, One Chun offers Peranakan Chinese and Phuket cuisine. Seafood dishes the restaurant previously has served include crab curry, deep fried shrimp, a minced kingfish curry, and kaeng som, while its meat dishes have included a pork belly stew, roasted red pork, and salt-sprinkled pork shoulder. The restaurant's dishes are inspired by recipes from the founder's grandmother and aunt. One Chun's sister restaurants are Raya and Chomchan which serve similar menus. One Chun received the Michelin Guide's Bib Gourmand award, which is given to restaurants deemed to be of "good quality" and "good value".

== History ==
One Chun was opened circa 2010. It is located in Phuket Old Town at 48/1 Thep Krasatti Road Talat Yai, Mueang Phuket, Phuket. One Chun is owned by Napapat "Prang" Chessadawan. The Michelin Guide gave the restaurant a Bib Gourmand award, which is given to "good quality, good value restaurants".

== Decor and ambience ==
One Chun occupies a Sino-Portuguese shophouse constructed in the 19th century. The shutters are tinted green and the tiled ground has a patterned design. The restaurant's owner, Napapat "Prang" Chessadawan, enjoys relics and art and is a fashion designer. One Chun, which has furnishings from the 1950s and old furniture, has a retro ambience. The Michelin Guide noted that Chessadawan decorated a wall in the restaurant with black-and-white television devices, transistor radios, and aged clocks. Noting that the establishment's patrons were eating food made from her grandmother's recipes, she wanted them to admire the decor that honored her grandmother. The Michelin Guide said the venue has "a distinct vintage feel", while Manager Daily said the restaurant's decorations were eye-catching. Belinda Jackson of The Sydney Morning Herald wrote in 2015 that "Thai starlets" eat at One Chun.

== Dishes ==
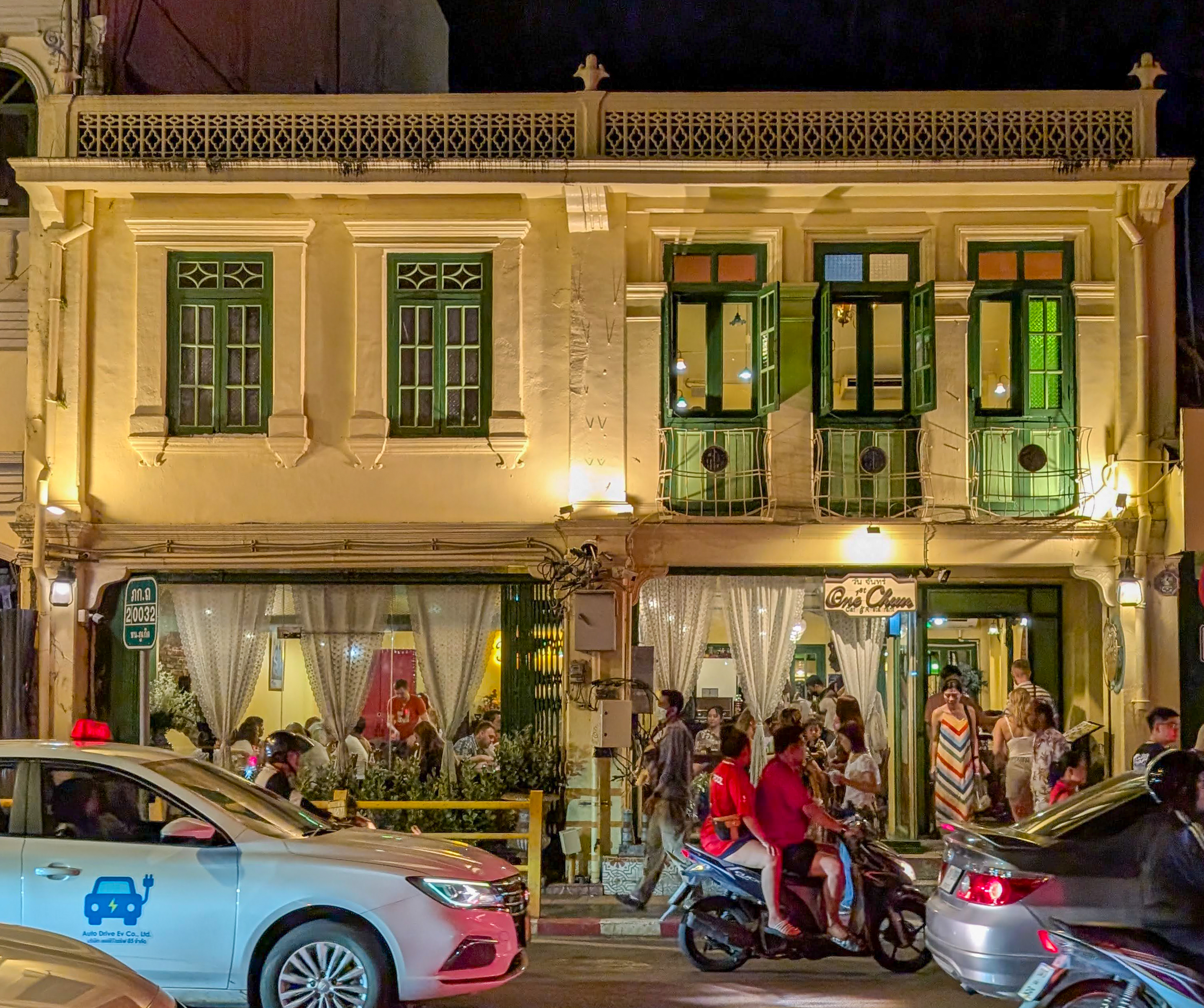
Restaurant building

One Chun offers Peranakan Chinese and Phuket cuisine and features seafood and curries. Family recipes passed down to the third generation from the founder's grandmother and aunt are used to make the entrées. The Lonely Planet's Isabella Noble in 2019 praised the restaurant for its seafood, citing its crab curry made with coconut milk. One Chun in 2021 served Nam Prik Goong Siab, a spicy entrée made with shrimp paste and containing dried shrimp that has been deep fried, giving it a "savoury crunchiness". The dish included vegetables to alleviate the peppery taste, which Kasidit Srivilai of the Michelin Guide said "balanc[es] the mixture's saltiness and sourness". Two meat dishes served in the early 2020s are Mu Hong, a pork belly stew made with low-temperature cooking and flavored with the spices pepper and garlic, and roasted red pork.

In 2021, One Chun served Gaeng Som Pla Mong, a minced kingfish curry that tastes sour and spicy. Another sour and spicy dish it served that year was kaeng som, a comfort food from southern Thailand, that usually includes shrimp or fish. One Chun in 2023 served the dish with pla mong, a jackfish that lives almost exclusively in the Andaman Sea. Another seafood dish, served in 2021, is Gung Makham, in which shrimp is deep fried and drenched in tamarind sauce. One Chun served the shrimp by filling pineapples with them. A dish recommended by the Michelin Guide circa 2019 is mu kua kluea, salt-sprinkled pork shoulder that is deep fried. The guide in 2023 recommended a second dish, crab meat and rice vermicelli soaked in yellow curry and coconut milk. Lifestyle Asia's Lisa Gries in 2021 found One Chun's curry to be very spicy. She noted that the restaurant's shaved ice, coffees, and cakes could make the spiciness more manageable. Time Out Shanghai writer Nutsuda Edens in 2023 lauded the restaurant's Bai Liang Phad Khai, a stir fried dish that contains melinjo leaves and dried shrimp. The dish is sweet and salty. Edens liked One Chun's rendition owing to how the leaves were cooked and the big shrimp.

== Sister restaurants ==
One Chun has two sister restaurants: Raya and Chomchan. All three restaurants are in Phuket. Raya was founded first, then One Chun, and finally Chomchan. One Chun was created by the niece of Madame Rose, who founded and owns Raya, which Kendall Hill of The Weekend Australian called "Phuket's most famous restaurant". While One Chun has a more modern setting, the two restaurants' menus are very much alike. The two serve crab curry containing coconut milk. Since One Chun has lower prices compared to Raya, it has numerous Thai customers. One Chun is frequented by younger patrons, while Raya is more popular among the older generation. Chomchan, the youngest sister restaurant, offers a number of the same dishes as Raya and One Chun.
