= Wheal Vor =

Disused mine in Cornwall, England

- Location in Cornwall
- Location: Breage, Cornwall, UK; 50°07′04″N 5°19′36″W
- Products: Copper and Tin
- Opened: 15th-century
- Closed: c.1910

Wheal Vor was a metalliferous mine about 2 miles (3.2 km) north west of Helston and 1 mile (1.6 km) north of the village of Breage in the west of Cornwall, England, UK. It is considered to be part of the Mount's Bay mining district. Until the mid-19th century the mine was known for its willingness to try out new innovations. Although very rich in copper and tin ores, the mine never lived up to its expectations. During the later part of the 19th century it had several periods of closure, with an attempt to reopen it in the 1960s which was not successful mainly because of bureaucracy. Today the site is part of the Cornwall and West Devon Mining Landscape.

== Geology ==
The country rock at the mine is killas, mostly hard, blue-grey rock. The mine's main produce was copper and tin derived from the nearby Tregonning-Godolphin granite, part of the Cornubian batholith. There were four main lodes at the mine, two of which were crossed by two wide elvan dykes, 20 and 48 ft (6.1 and 14.6 m) wide. At the intersections the lodes widened and mineralization spread through the dykes, forming irregular masses which were stoped to the full width of the dykes.

== Early history ==
Wheal Vor is an ancient mine: the ground shows the remains of old surface excavations following the lodes, and mining may have taken place here in late Roman times. The underground mine probably started in the 15th-century and continued until 1715 producing mainly copper ore. The mine was associated with the Godolphin family who were keen on trying out recent innovations, and through their connections it may have been the first mine in Cornwall to make use of gunpowder, at the close of the 17th century.

Shortly after 1700 the mine may have been one of the few sites to trial Thomas Savery's pump, which was, according to his patent application, "A new invention for raiseing of water … by the impellent force of fire, which will be of great use and advantage for drayning mines…". It is not certain whether Savery's experiments took place at Wheal Vor or at another nearby mine, but it is known that c. 1710 a Newcomen engine had been installed here, which was probably the first in Cornwall.

The mine was abandoned in about 1715 and it was almost a century before it was reopened by Captain John Gundry. It then continued to trial new inventions, such as the second Woolf engine in the county (1815); one of the first Brunton Calciners (1830); and an early man engine (c. 1856). It also one of the few mines to operate its own smelter, having taken over the one owned by the Cornish Copper Company (a major shareholder) in 1823 and later moving to the mine. Wheal Vor was also the site of the first steam stamping mill in 1812.

The years between 1812 and 1848 were the mine's most successful, and it was for a time the richest mine in Cornwall. The ore raised from the 274 fathom (Note: A "fathom" is equal to six feet (about 1.83 metres). At the time fathoms were the standard way of expressing depth in mines.) (501 metres) level contained on average 5% tin, instead of the 1–1.5% that was usually found in Cornish mines, and for some time after the discovery of this rich lode the mine regularly produced 200 tons of white tin per month. Despite this, the profits from the mine were not enough to keep Gundry's company solvent and in 1828 the company entered into bankruptcy, with the litigation lasting twenty years. In 1836 the mine was employing 1,174 people, but it closed between 1848 and 1853. Surface work continued at the site until 1852, when the mine property was under new ownership.

Before the mine was abandoned in 1848, its condition was described as being unsafe to work in, and accidents were attributed to these poor conditions. The mine was in litigation for some years before it was abandoned and during this time no repairs were made and safety conditions steadily became worse. However, under new ownership safety issues at the mine were corrected and it was reopened; afterwards employing about 1,200 men.

== 1850 onwards ==
In 1854 a 100-inch (2.54 m) (Note: This refers to the diameter of the cylinder. It was the standard way of determining the size, but not necessarily the power, of steam engines.) steam engine, the largest in Cornwall at the time, was installed on Crease's shaft (Note: Crease's shaft was named after Henry Pering Pellew Crease, the company chairman at the time.) for draining the mine. This engine was built by Harvey & Co of Hayle (the other main shareholder in the mine) and its starting was accompanied by a large celebration. But by 1860, it and another 85-inch (2.16 m) were using 600 tons of coal a month, which was determined to be unsustainable so both engines were stopped and later sold.

From a peak production of over 840 tons of black tin in 1865 and 1866, the output from the mine declined until in 1877 only 13 tons was produced. Between 1877 and 1881 the mine was apparently idle until 1881 when five people were working there, and on 23 October 1879 the mine was put up for sale at a public auction. When running at its peak out of £2,000,000 worth of tin, Messrs Gundry and successors had a profit of £272,000. The Godolphin family and Messrs Williams and Co yielded nearly £100,000 in dividends from copper ore. An engine was erected near the head of the valley, in 1885, to extract tin from the accumulation of many years of waste which filled the valley. Until 1885 up to 22 people were employed, though only minimal amounts of ore were sold. There was another gap until 1906, when 65 people were recorded as working at the mine, 16 of them underground. The mine produced some black tin between 1907 and 1910, but then evidently closed again, probably due to difficulty keeping water out of the mine.

Wheal Vor was the main component of the "Great Wheal Vor United" group of mines, which included among others, Polladras Mine, Penhale Wheal Vor, Wheal Metal and Sithney Wheal Metal. Wheal Vor also took over the mining setts of two other mines; Carleen Mine (otherwise known as West Wheal Vor), and Wheal Vreah.

== 20th century to present ==
By the 1960s it was considered that the mine had never been fully developed and there were several ore bodies that could be commercially exploited. The sett was investigated by Camborne Tin Limited which submitted an application to re-open the mine. It was thought that as it might employ some 400 people in a designated Development Area which had an unemployment rate of 6% there was a good chance that permission would be granted, but planning permission was refused because the local water company obtained part of its water supply from an adit flowing out of the old mine. The water company was encouraged to locate an alternative source, and it identified Loe Pool as a potential source, but this was opposed on the grounds that it was polluted by sewage. The cost of treating this led to another public enquiry which caused delays.

Meanwhile, the ownership of the mineral rights for the proposed mine was also causing problems: although the major part was held by the Treworlis Estate which was cooperative, the 11th Duke of Leeds owned land that the deeper parts of the mine were to pass under, and negotiations with the Leeds Estates were prolonged and later complicated by the death of the Duke and then, within a year, the death of his successor without an heir in 1964. This meant the Leeds estate had to be sold which caused further delays.

Pending resolution of the outstanding issues, Camborne Tin Limited applied for permission to make exploratory drillings – this was granted, but they were not allowed to drill in the former Leeds Estate lands, and it became apparent that this was where the undiscovered ore bodies were likely to be found. In 1967, the company decided that it could no longer tolerate the delays, and the mine was never re-opened.

Today, there is little visible above ground of the once extensive sett of the mine. An engine house and chimney are the most obvious remains. The cottages at Wheal Vor have been listed as Grade II buildings since 22 December 1972. The Trevithick Society published a history of the mine, entitled Great Wheal Vor in October 2015. Since 2006 the site has been part of the Tregonning and Trewavas Mining District of the Cornwall and West Devon Mining Landscape.

== Mineral Statistics ==
From Robert Hunt's Mineral Statistics of the United Kingdom.

Copper Production (1801-60)
Year	Ore (tons)	Metal (tons)	Value (£)
1801	50.00	4.70	420.20
1812	37.00	3.05	238.65
1813	47.00	4.70	394.80
1814	12.00	0.66	68.10
1821	91.00	15.23	1174.45
1822	584.00	68.71	5195.70
1823	654.00	59.02	4703.98
1824	269.00	20.22	1682.83
1825	185.00	12.17	1195.08
1826	181.00	9.74	667.83
1827	215.00	12.12	862.40
1828	259.00	12.84	916.68
1829	306.00	16.59	1190.30
1830	104.00	6.10	382.25
1831	94.00	4.94	272.60
1832	63.00	3.39	200.03
1833	53.00	2.65	185.50
1835	138.00	7.97	576.30
1836	58.00	3.70	387.15
1837	36.00	3.15	211.50
1838	415.00	36.13	2758.90
1839	457.00	29.38	2102.18
1840	194.00	9.99	685.13
1841	114.00	5.49	419.10
1842	80.00	3.85	253.80
1843	58.00	2.79	174.58
1844	39.00	1.73	103.35
1845	24.00	1.59	106.20
1846	17.00	0.81	53.55
1848	8.00	0.67	42.60
1851	7.00	0.51	32.55
1860	6.00	0.45	41.85

Tin Ticketing Production (Note: These figures are highly incomplete, due the ongoing lawsuit and the company's desire to keep its true figures secret.)
Year(s)	Black (Tons)	Tin (Tons)	Value (£)
1821	50.00	..	2165.63
1822	825.00	..	..
1823	822.50	..	..
1836	458.50	304.97	31414.06

Stannary Tin Production (1839-1860)
Year(s)	Black (Tons)	Value (£)	Comment
1839	117.61	8,889.35	Last quarter only
1840	755.10	58,159.15	Probably tin metal
1841	544.46	27,252.23	Probably tin metal, 2nd quarter figures dubious
1842	1,505.09	61,684.00	..
1843	1,192.21	43,595.20	..
1844	841.13	35,061.95	..
1845	685.25	33,849.73	..
1846	594.94	30,614.28	..
1847	303.02	14,946.73	..
1848	246.19	9,906.40	..
1849	172.44	7,151.55	..
1850	193.69	8,190.20	..
1851	108.60	4,277.98	..
1852	134.84	5,988.68	Or Vor Consols
1853	151.58	7,628.75	Or Great Vor
1854	187.42	11,236.31	Or Great Vor
1855	308.54	19,417.37	Or Great Vor
1860	197.69	16,035.30	..

Tin Production (1853-1920) (Note: From Robert Hunt's Mineral Statistics of the United Kingdom)
Year(s)	Black (Tons)	Stuff (Tons)	Value (£)
1853	26.00	..	1,938.40
1854	187.40	..	13,090.00
1855	313.10	..	19,192.50
1856	424.70	..	29,681.50
1857	696.60	..	53,584.20
1858	573.90	..	36,662.20
1859	381.10	..	30,195.20
1860	233.10	..	19,082.70
1861	214.70	..	15,876.30
1862	338.40	..	22,917.00
1863	348.40	..	24,655.80
1864	576.20	..	38,280.20
1865	847.80	..	49,420.20
1866	844.90	..	43,798.50
1867	658.50	..	36,867.90
1868	661.00	..	38,166.70
1869	576.90	..	41,879.70
1870	362.70	..	27,884.90
1871	320.10	..	26,574.70
1872	297.60	..	26,465.10
1873	305.00	..	23,645.40
1874	83.50	..	4,429.00
1875	40.60	..	1,824.90
1876	47.40	..	1,749.80
1877	13.10	..	494.70
1883	0.10	4.00	2.00
1884	0.10	3.00	2.00
1885	no-details	..	..
1907	9.10	..	892.00
1908	13.10	..	961.00
1909	32.70	..	2,455.00
1910	9.50	..	747.00
1914-1920	no-details	..	..

Employment (1881-1910)
Year(s)	Total	Overground	Underground
1881	5	..	5
1882	19	15	4
1883	6	..	6
1884	8	2	6
1885	22	14	8
1906	65	49	16
1907	92	65	27
1908	103	56	47
1909	90	53	37
1910	49	36	13

== Sources ==
- Barton, D. B. (1966). The Cornish Beam Engine (New ed.). Truro: D. Bradford Barton Ltd.
- Burt, Roger; Waite, Peter; Burnley, Ray (1987). Cornish Mines: Metalliferous and Associated Minerals 1845–1913. University of Exeter. ISBN 0-85989-287-5.
- Dines, H. G. (1956). The Metalliferous Mining Region of South-West England. Volume I. London: HMSO. pp. 224–227.
- Earl, Bryan (1994). Cornish Mining: The Techniques of Metal Mining in the West of England, Past and Present (2nd ed.). St Austell: Cornish Hillside Publications. ISBN 0-9519419-3-3.
- Hancock, Peter (2008). The Mining Heritage of Cornwall and West Devon. Wellington, Somerset: Halsgrove. ISBN 978-1-84114-753-6.
- Hunt, Robert (1887). British Mining: A Treatise on the History, Discovery, Practical Development and Future Prospects of Metalliferous Mines in the United Kingdom. Lockwood.
- Phillips, John (1850). Report on the Ventilation of Mines and Collieries. William Clowes and Sons.
