= Phuket Old Town =

Historical area in Phuket, Thailand

Coordinates: 7.885714°N 98.387558°E

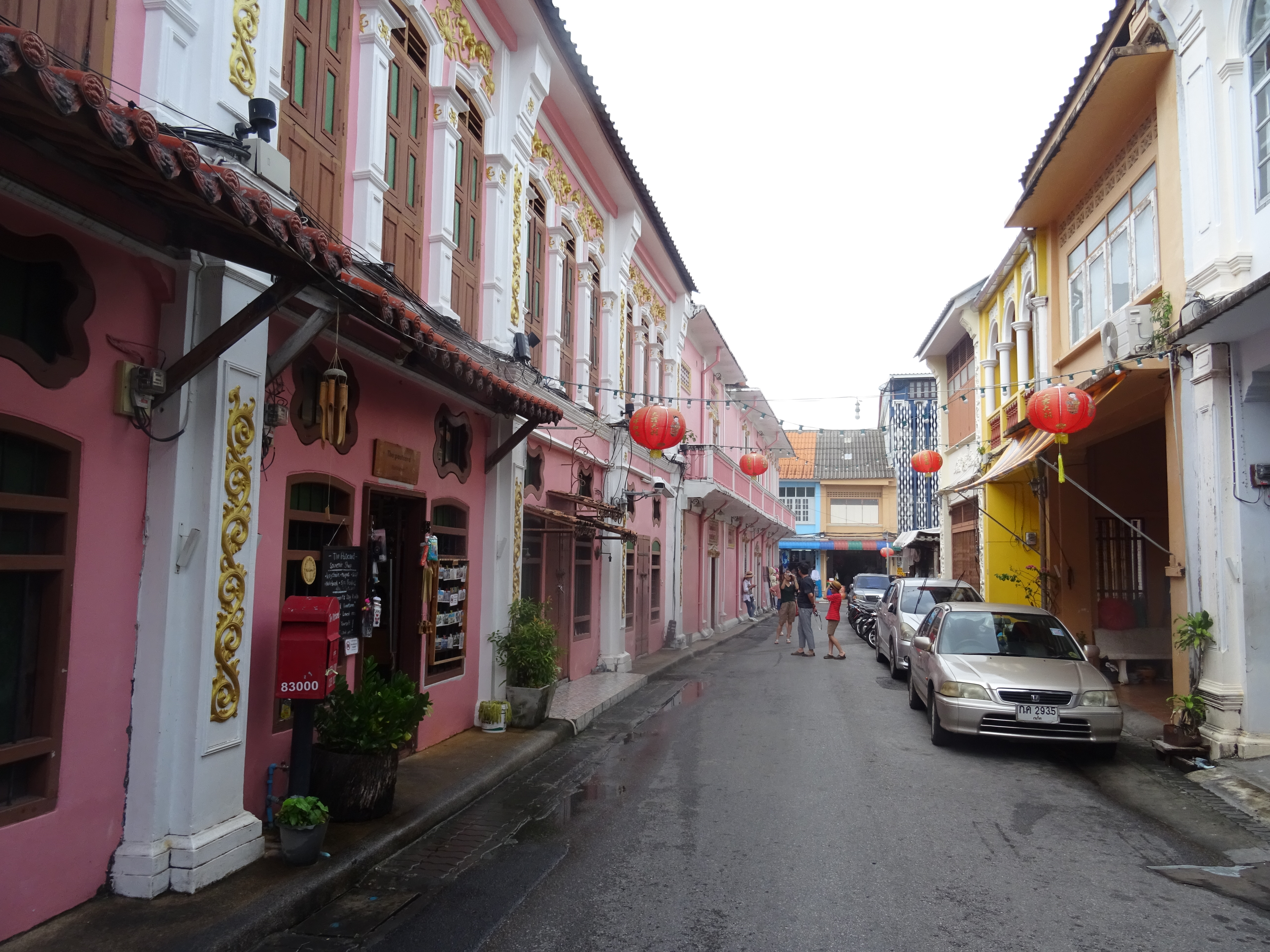
Shophouses on Soi Rommanee, Phuket Old Town (2018)

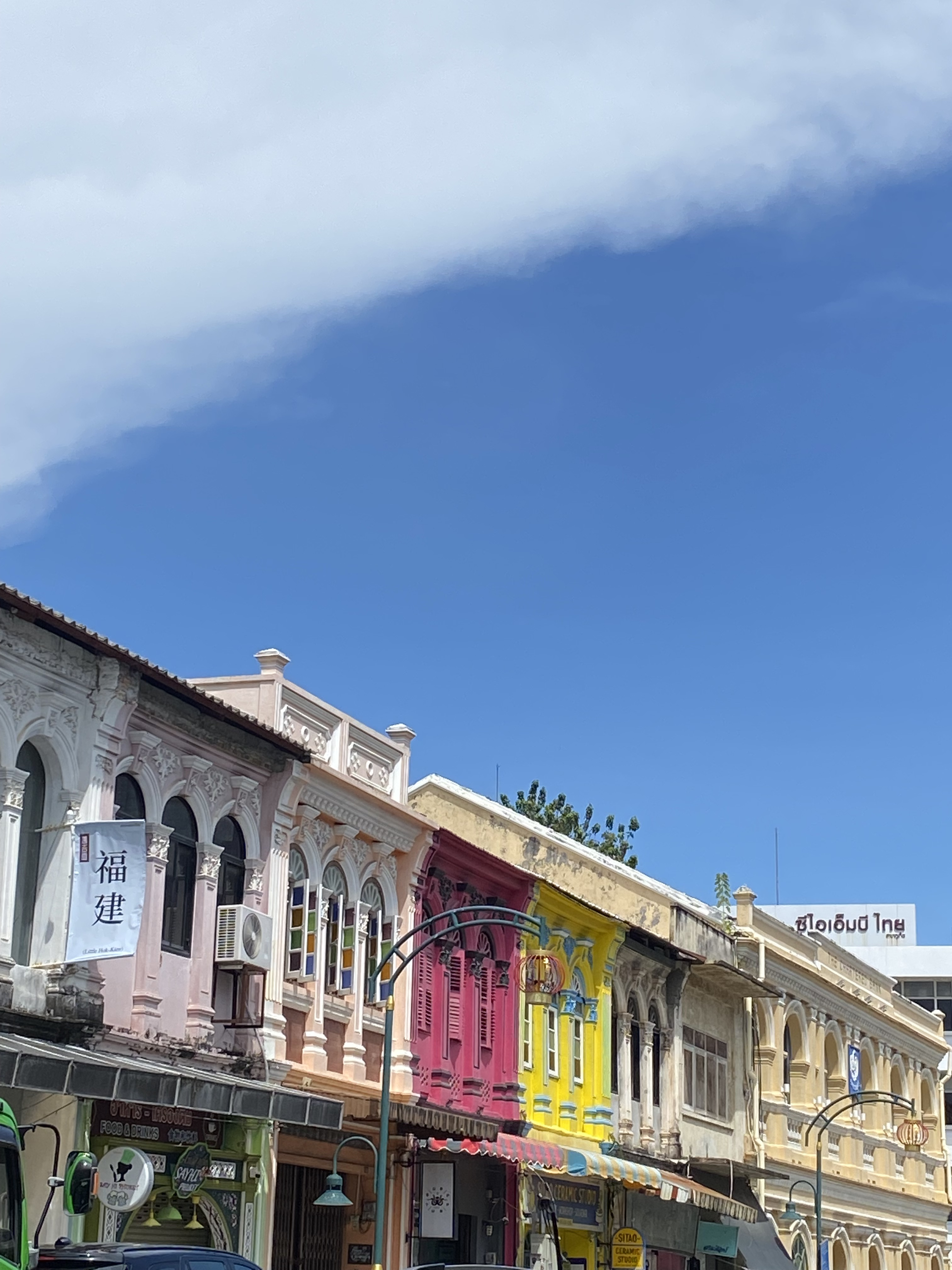
Phuket old town

The Old Town is an area of historical interest in the city of Phuket. The main streets of Old Town are Thalang, Phang Nga, Krabi, Dibuk, and Yoawarat. Old Town is noted for Sino-Portuguese buildings on both sides of the street. Many old buildings have been converted into shops, hotels, restaurants, and museums. Although Phuket Town is not a resort town, the nearest beaches are Patong, Karon and Kata.

== History ==
Phuket has a rich history as tin-mining country peopled by Siamese, Chinese, Malays, Indians, Eurasians, and sea gypsies. A unique community in Phuket are the "Baba", with their own way of life, language, dress, and food. The core of this community was formed by early unions between Hokkien tin-miners and Siamese women. This distinctive Baba heritage can be seen in Phuket's Old Town.

Since the 16th century, Europeans have been involved in the tin trade of Phuket. In the 18th century, much of the island's tin mining was carried out by Hokkien Chinese who were instrumental in building the old part of the city. In the early-20th century, under Governor Phraya Ratsadanupradit Mahitsaraphakdi, major European mining companies were invited in, and major public infrastructure such as roads and canals was built. Many buildings in Sino-Portuguese style from this period are preserved and restored, particularly the shophouses and the big mansions. No one knows exactly when the first building in this style was constructed, but photographs from the reign of King Rama V (1853–1910) show that it was already well established by then.

== Attractions ==
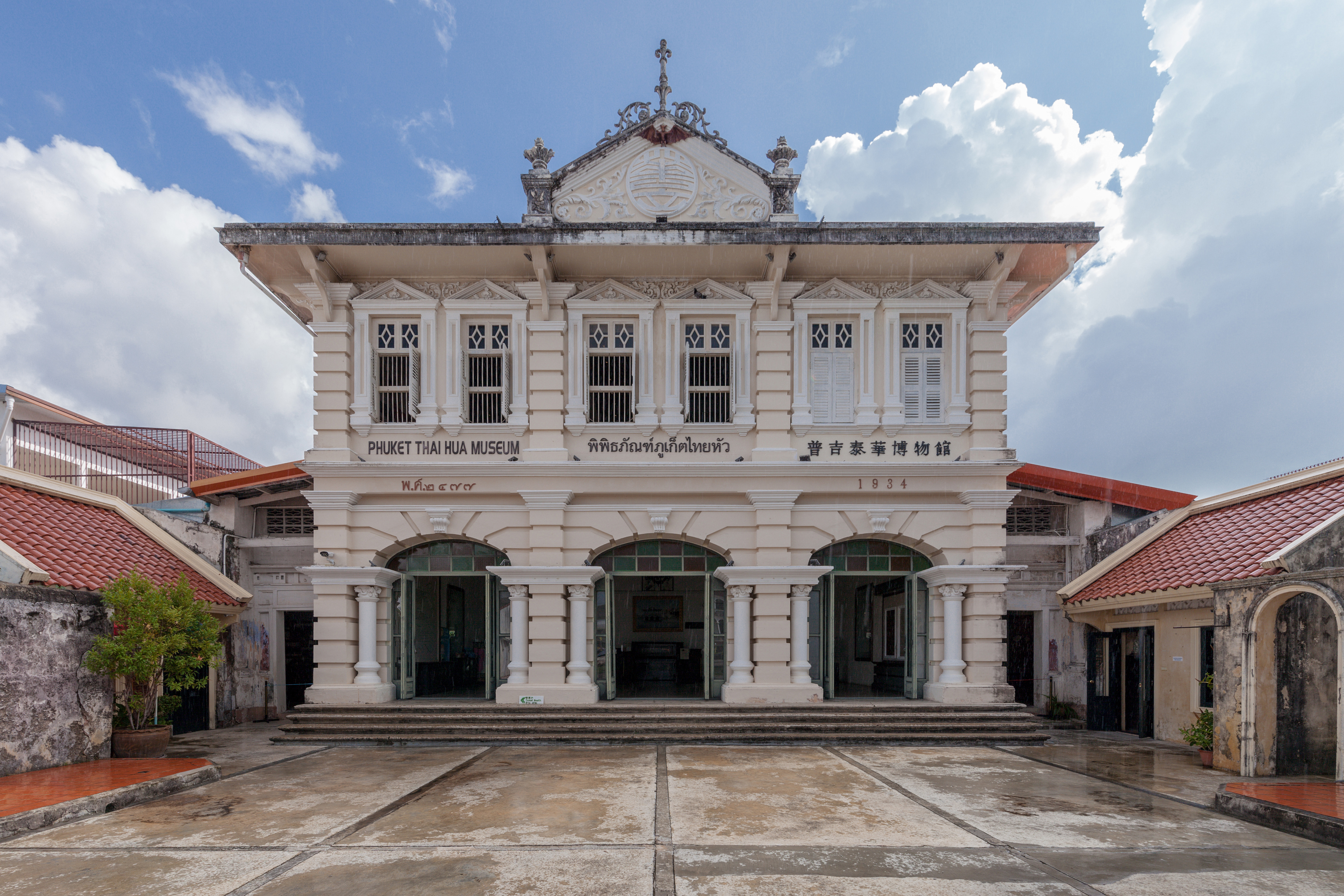
Thai Hua Museum in 2019, previously a Sino-Portuguese mansion

- China Inn Cafe and Restaurant
- The House of the Beautiful Images coffee shop
- Thai Hua Museum
- Baan Chinpracha Museum
- Phra Pitak Chinpracha Mansion
- Phuket Provincial Hall
- Phuket Philatelic Museum
- On On Hotel
- Kopitiam Restaurant
- One Chun
