= Standard state =

Thermodynamics material reference point

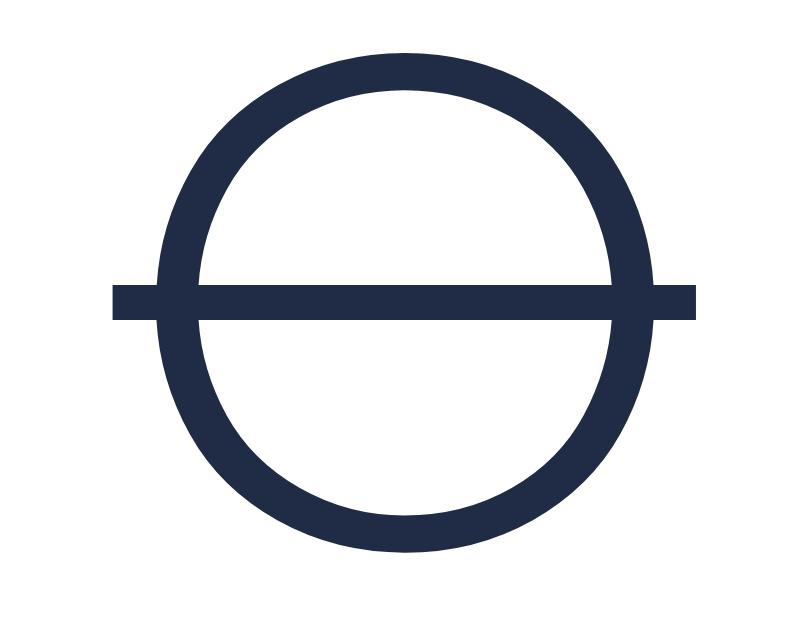
A Plimsoll symbol, initially intended as a load line for ships, as labelled by the Lloyd's Register

The standard state of a material (pure substance, mixture or solution) is a reference point used to calculate its properties under different conditions. A degree sign (°) or a superscript 𜻰 symbol (^{𜻰}) is used to designate a thermodynamic quantity in the standard state, such as change in enthalpy (ΔH°), change in entropy (ΔS°), or change in Gibbs free energy (ΔG°). The degree symbol has become widespread, although the Plimsoll symbol is recommended in standards; see discussion about typesetting below.

In principle, the choice of standard state is arbitrary, although the International Union of Pure and Applied Chemistry (IUPAC) recommends a conventional set of standard states for general use. The standard state should not be confused with standard temperature and pressure (STP) for gases, nor with the standard solutions used in analytical chemistry. STP is commonly used for calculations involving gases that approximate an ideal gas, whereas standard state conditions are used for thermodynamic calculations.

For a given material or substance, the standard state is the reference state for the material's thermodynamic state properties, such as enthalpy, entropy, Gibbs free energy, and for many other material standards. The standard enthalpy change of formation for an element in its standard state is zero, and this convention allows a wide range of other thermodynamic quantities to be calculated and tabulated. The standard state of a substance does not need to exist in nature: for example, it is possible to calculate values for steam at 298.15 K and 10^{5} Pa, although steam does not exist (as a gas) under these conditions. The advantage of this practice is that tables of thermodynamic properties prepared in this way are self-consistent.

== Conventional standard states ==
Many standard states are non-physical states, often referred to as "hypothetical states". Nevertheless, their thermodynamic properties are well-defined, usually by an extrapolation from some limiting condition, such as zero pressure or zero concentration, to a specified condition (usually unit concentration or pressure) using an ideal extrapolating function, such as ideal solution or ideal gas behavior, or by empirical measurements. Strictly speaking, temperature is not part of the definition of a standard state. However, most tables of thermodynamic quantities are compiled at specific temperatures, most commonly room temperature (298.15 K, 25 °C, 77 °F), or, somewhat less commonly, the freezing point of water (273.15 K, 0 °C, 32 °F).

=== Gases ===
The standard state for a gas is the hypothetical state it would have as a pure substance obeying the ideal gas equation at standard pressure. IUPAC recommends using a standard pressure p^{⦵} or P° equal to 10^{5} Pa, or 1 bar. No real gas has perfectly ideal behavior, but this definition of the standard state allows corrections for non-ideality to be made consistently for all the different gases.

=== Liquids and solids ===
The standard state for liquids and solids is simply the state of the pure substance subjected to a total pressure of 10^{5} Pa (or 1 bar). For most elements, the reference point of Δ_{f}H^{⦵} = 0 is defined for the most stable allotrope of the element, such as graphite in the case of carbon, and the β-phase (white tin) in the case of tin. An exception is white phosphorus, the most common allotrope of phosphorus, which is defined as the standard state despite being only metastable. This is because the thermodynamically stable black allotrope is difficult to prepare in pure form.

=== Solutes ===
For a substance in solution (solute), the standard state C° is usually chosen as the hypothetical state it would have at the standard state molality or amount concentration but exhibiting infinite-dilution behavior (where there are no solute-solute interactions, but solute-solvent interactions are present). The reason for this unusual definition is that the behavior of a solute at the limit of infinite dilution is described by equations which are very similar to the equations for ideal gases. Hence, taking infinite-dilution behavior to be the standard state allows corrections for non-ideality to be made consistently for all the different solutes. The standard state molality is 1 mol/kg, while the standard state molarity is 1 mol/dm^{3}.

Other choices are possible. For example, the use of a standard state concentration of 10^{−7} mol/L for the hydrogen ion in a real, aqueous solution is common in the field of biochemistry. In other application areas such as electrochemistry, the standard state is sometimes chosen as the actual state of the real solution at a standard concentration (often 1 mol/dm^{3}). The activity coefficients will not transfer from convention to convention, and so it is very important to know and understand what conventions were used in the construction of tables of standard thermodynamic properties before using them to describe solutions.

=== Adsorbates ===
For molecules adsorbed on surfaces, various conventions have been proposed based on hypothetical standard states. For adsorption that occurs on specific sites (Langmuir adsorption isotherm) the most common standard state is a relative coverage of θ° = 0.5, as this choice results in a cancellation of the configurational entropy term and is also consistent with neglecting to include the standard state (which is a common error). The advantage of using θ° = 0.5 is that the configurational term cancels and the entropy extracted from thermodynamic analyses is thus reflective of intra-molecular changes between the bulk phase (such as gas or liquid) and the adsorbed state. There may be benefit to tabulating values based on both the relative coverage-based standard state and, in an additional column, the absolute coverage-based standard state. For 2D gas states, the complications of discrete states do not arise, and an absolute density-based standard state has been proposed, similar to that for the 3D gas phase.

== Typesetting ==
During development in the nineteenth century, the superscript Plimsoll symbol (^{⦵}) was adopted to indicate the non-zero nature of the standard state. IUPAC recommends in the 3rd edition of Quantities, Units and Symbols in Physical Chemistry a symbol which seems to be a degree sign (°) as a substitute for the plimsoll mark. In the very same publication the plimsoll mark appears to be constructed by combining a horizontal stroke with a degree sign. A range of similar symbols are used in the literature: a stroked lowercase letter O (^{~~o~~}), a superscript zero (^{0}) or a circle with a horizontal bar either where the bar extends beyond the boundaries of the circle (U+29B5 ⦵ CIRCLE WITH HORIZONTAL BAR) or is enclosed by the circle, dividing the circle in half (U+2296 ⊖ CIRCLED MINUS). Compared to the plimsoll symbol used in 1800s texts, the U+29B5 glyph is too large, and its horizontal line does not extend far enough beyond the boundaries of the circle. It is easily confused with the Greek letter theta (uppercase Θ or ϴ, lowercase θ). The character U+1CEF0 𜻰 MEDIUM SMALL WHITE CIRCLE WITH HORIZONTAL BAR was added to Unicode in September 2025 with the release of version 17.0. It is a regular-sized symbol intended for use in superscript form to denote the standard state, replacing U+29B5 for this purpose. On a Mac computer, the plimsoll symbol can be located in the Character Viewer app (cf. Globe key: 🌐_{fn}) by entering its Unicode code U+29B5 in the search field.

Ian M. Mills, who was involved in producing a revision of Quantities, Units and Symbols in Physical Chemistry, suggested that a superscript zero ($^0$) is an equal alternative to indicate "standard state", though a degree symbol (°) is used in the same article. The degree symbol has come into widespread use in general, inorganic, and physical chemistry textbooks in recent years. When read out loud, the symbol is pronounced "naught".

== See also ==
- Standard conditions for temperature and pressure
- Standard molar entropy

== Bibliography ==
- International Union of Pure and Applied Chemistry (1982). "Notation for states and processes, significance of the word standard in chemical thermodynamics, and remarks on commonly tabulated forms of thermodynamic functions" (PDF). Pure Appl. Chem. 54 (6): 1239–50. doi:10.1351/pac198254061239. S2CID 53868401.
- IUPAC–IUB–IUPAB Interunion Commission of Biothermodynamics (1976). "Recommendations for measurement and presentation of biochemical equilibrium data". J. Biol. Chem. 251 (22): 6879–85. doi:10.1016/S0021-9258(17)32917-4.
