= Phuket (city) =

City in Thailand

Phuket ภูเก็ต
- City Municipality
- City of Phuket เทศบาลนครภูเก็ต

Other transcription(s)
  - Thai: ภูเก็ต
  - Jawi: بوکيت (Jawi)
  - Hokkien: 普吉市; Phóo-kiat-tshī (Tâi-lô)
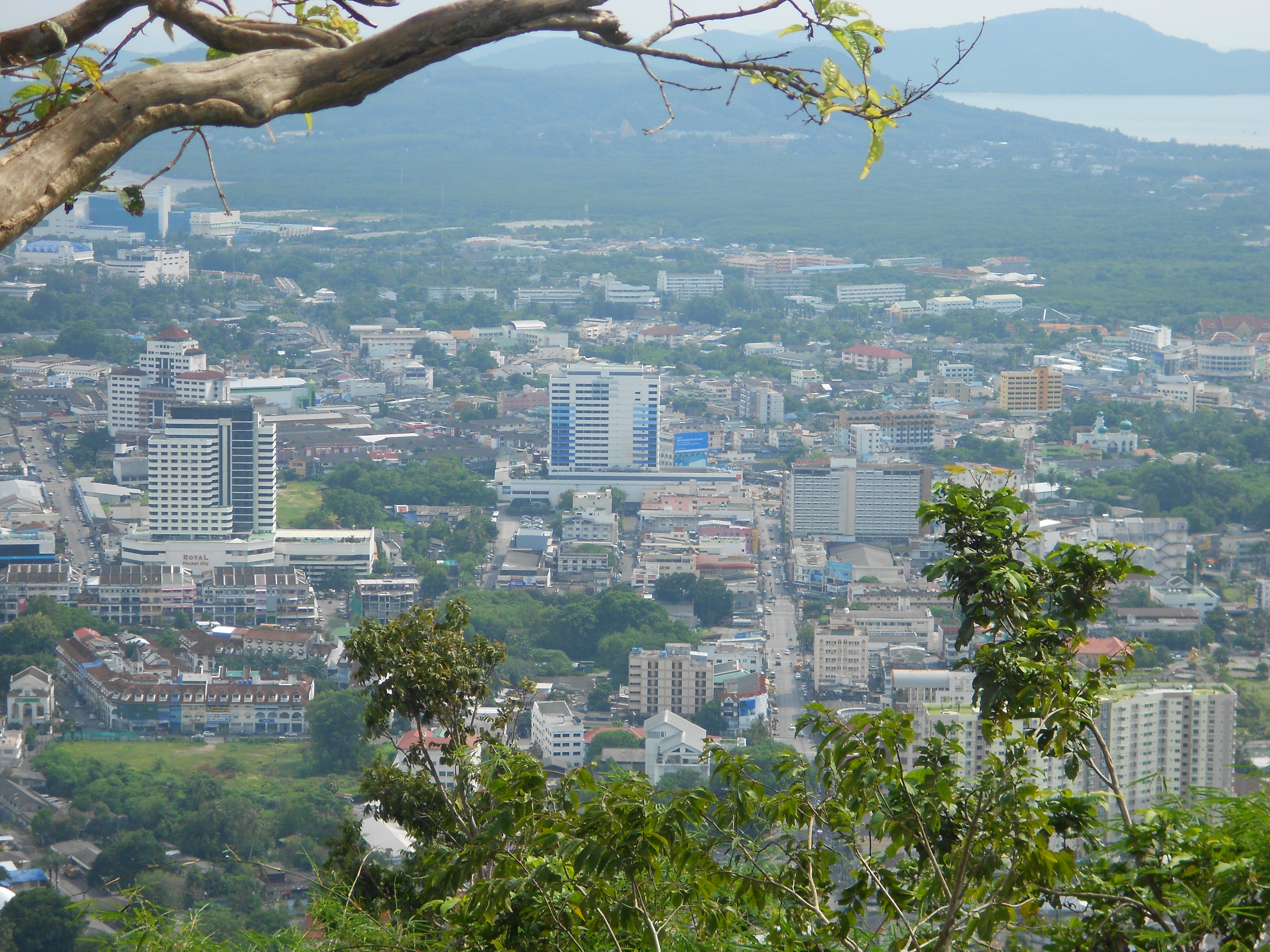
- Phuket

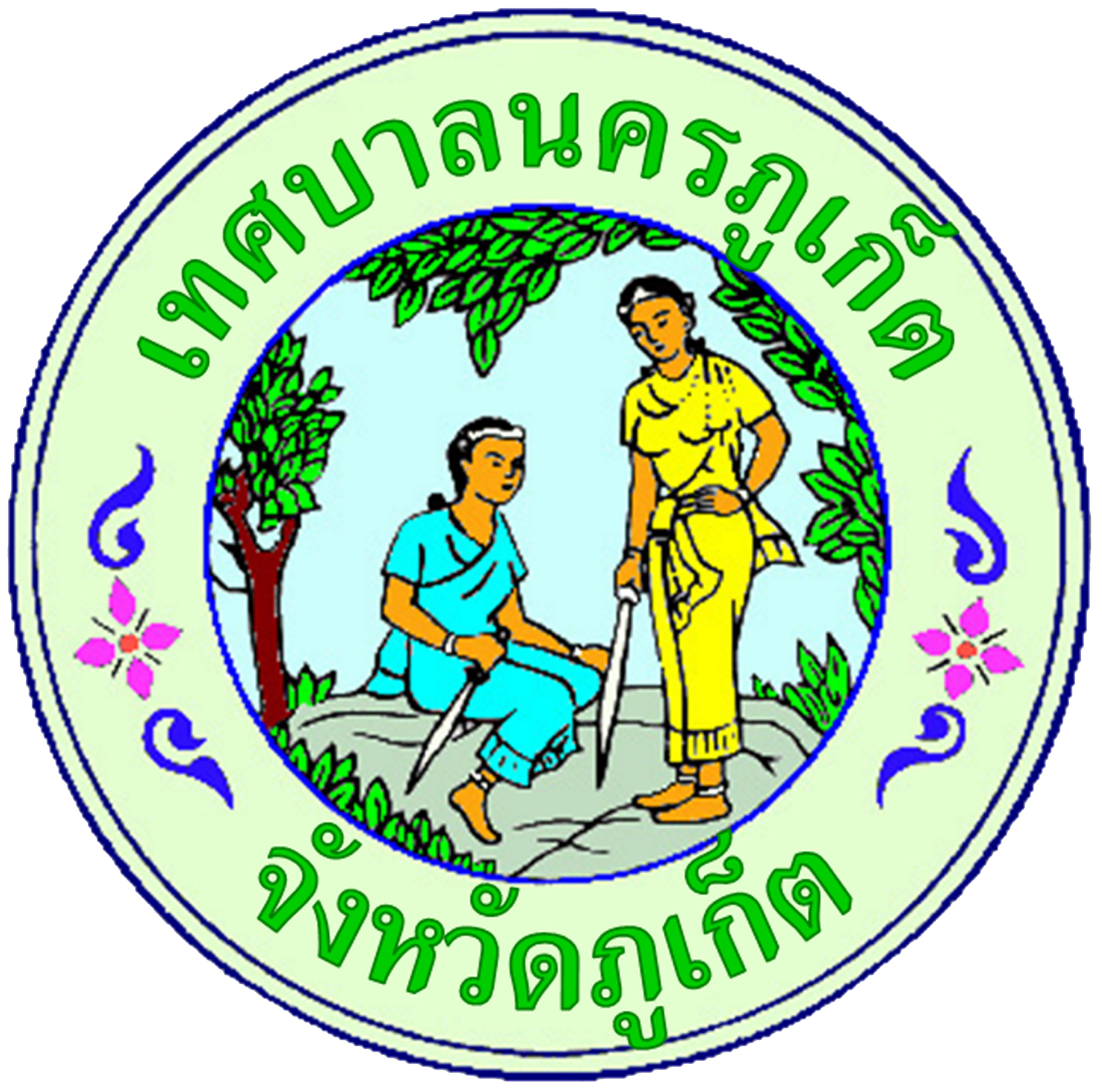
- Seal

- Location in Thailand
- Coordinates: 7°53′17″N 98°23′51″E
- Country: Thailand
- Province: Phuket province
- District: Mueang Phuket

Government
  - Type: City Municipality
  - Mayor: Saroj Ankanapilas

Area
  - City Municipality: 12 km^{2} (4.6 sq mi)
  - Metro: 224 km^{2} (86 sq mi)

Population (2024)
  - City Municipality: 71,284
  - Density: 5,900/km^{2} (15,000/sq mi)
  - Urban: 252,515
  - Metro: 430,000
- Time zone: UTC+7 (ICT)
- Area code: (+66) 76
- Geocode: 8399
- Website: phuketcity.go.th

Phuket (/puːˈkɛt/ poo-KET; Thai: เทศบาลนครภูเก็ต or ภูเก็ต, pronounced [pʰūː.kèt]) is a city in the southeast of Phuket Island, Thailand, and the capital of Phuket province. As of 2024 the city municipality had a population of 71,284 and an urban population of 252,515 in the entire district of Amphoe Mueang. The broader metropolitan area has a population of about 430,000.

Phuket is 862 km (535.6 mi) south of Bangkok.

== History ==
Phuket is one of the oldest cities in Thailand. It was an important port on the west coast of the Malay Peninsula where Chinese immigrants first landed.

Phuket Old Town has heritage buildings in ten streets: Klang, Phang Nga, Rassada, Dee Buk, Krabi, Thep Kasattri, Phuket, Yaowarat, Satun, and Soi Rammanee. These older buildings show Phuket town's former prosperity. They were constructed when tin mining was an important industry on the island. Their architectural style is called "Sino-Portuguese", characteristic of which is a single or two-storey building with a narrow front compensated for by considerable depth. The tiles, doors, perforated windows, and other details are all influenced by Chinese and European styles combined. "Phuket Old Town" is a 2.7 km^{2} area covering a total of 210 rai.

As of 2019, the Fine Arts Department and the Phuket provincial authorities are preparing a proposal to the United Nations Educational, Scientific and Cultural Organization (UNESCO) for Phuket Old Town to be listed as a World Heritage Site.

In 2004, the town was elevated to city status (thesaban nakhon, Thai: เทศบาลนคร).

== Culture ==
The major religion is Buddhism. The Buddhist temples in the city are attractive destinations for national and international tourists. Along the streets some Hindu temples depicting the statues of Ganesha and Brahma can also be seen. Despite this there are actually far more registered mosques in Phuket than there are Buddhist Wats.

Phuket was registered by Creative Cities Network of UNESCO for the City of Gastronomy in 2015, becoming the first city in SEA to receive this title for its unique, multicultural, and historic of Phuket cuisines.

== Climate ==
Climate data for Phuket (1991–2020, extremes 1951-present)
Month	Jan	Feb	Mar	Apr	May	Jun	Jul	Aug	Sep	Oct	Nov	Dec	Year
Record high °C (°F)	37.0 (98.6)	38.5 (101.3)	39.3 (102.7)	39.4 (102.9)	38.0 (100.4)	36.0 (96.8)	35.0 (95.0)	35.5 (95.9)	35.0 (95.0)	35.3 (95.5)	35.9 (96.6)	34.2 (93.6)	39.4 (102.9)
Mean daily maximum °C (°F)	33.0 (91.4)	34.0 (93.2)	34.4 (93.9)	34.2 (93.6)	33.2 (91.8)	32.6 (90.7)	32.3 (90.1)	32.2 (90.0)	31.8 (89.2)	31.8 (89.2)	32.1 (89.8)	32.1 (89.8)	32.8 (91.1)
Daily mean °C (°F)	28.3 (82.9)	29.0 (84.2)	29.4 (84.9)	29.6 (85.3)	29.1 (84.4)	28.7 (83.7)	28.4 (83.1)	28.3 (82.9)	27.8 (82.0)	27.6 (81.7)	28.0 (82.4)	27.9 (82.2)	28.5 (83.3)
Mean daily minimum °C (°F)	25.0 (77.0)	25.4 (77.7)	25.9 (78.6)	26.3 (79.3)	26.1 (79.0)	25.8 (78.4)	25.6 (78.1)	25.6 (78.1)	25.1 (77.2)	24.9 (76.8)	25.2 (77.4)	25.0 (77.0)	25.5 (77.9)
Record low °C (°F)	17.4 (63.3)	18.6 (65.5)	20.0 (68.0)	20.5 (68.9)	21.2 (70.2)	21.9 (71.4)	20.5 (68.9)	21.1 (70.0)	21.1 (70.0)	20.5 (68.9)	19.3 (66.7)	18.4 (65.1)	17.4 (63.3)
Average precipitation mm (inches)	49.9 (1.96)	24.0 (0.94)	80.7 (3.18)	135.1 (5.32)	236.9 (9.33)	249.4 (9.82)	240.2 (9.46)	308.7 (12.15)	350.4 (13.80)	336.0 (13.23)	178.2 (7.02)	82.0 (3.23)	2,271.5 (89.43)
Average precipitation days (≥ 1.0 mm)	4.3	2.2	6.0	9.6	15.7	15.9	16.3	16.9	18.9	19.4	12.9	7.8	145.9
Average relative humidity (%)	75.7	73.9	76.3	79.2	81.4	81.7	81.5	81.6	83.6	85.0	82.8	78.9	80.1
Mean monthly sunshine hours	279.0	245.8	275.9	240.0	158.1	117.0	120.9	117.8	108.0	179.8	219.0	260.4	2,321.7
Mean daily sunshine hours	9.0	8.7	8.9	8.0	5.1	3.9	3.9	3.8	3.6	5.8	7.3	8.4	6.4
Source 1: World Meteorological Organization Feb–May record highs, 1951–2022; Nov–Feb record lows, 1951–2021;
Source 2: Office of Water Management and Hydrology, Royal Irrigation Department (sun 1981–2010)(extremes)

== Demographics ==
Since 2005, the population of Phuket has been increasing.

Estimation date	31 Dec 2005	31 Dec 2010	31 Dec 2015	31 Dec 2019
Population	74,208	75,720	78,421	79,308

== Transportation ==
Locals and tourists alike mainly use the songthaews to travel around. Blue songthaews connect Phuket Old Town with the various beach resorts around the island, while a new fleet of electric buses have replaced pink songthaews for local travel between bus terminals, shopping centres and other attractions in Phuket Old Town.

Phuket International Airport is 36 kilometres (22 mi) northwest of Phuket Old Town. There is currently an hourly scheduled bus service between the airport and Phuket Old Town.

== Sister cities ==
- Las Vegas, Nevada, United States
- George Town, Penang, Malaysia

== Photos ==
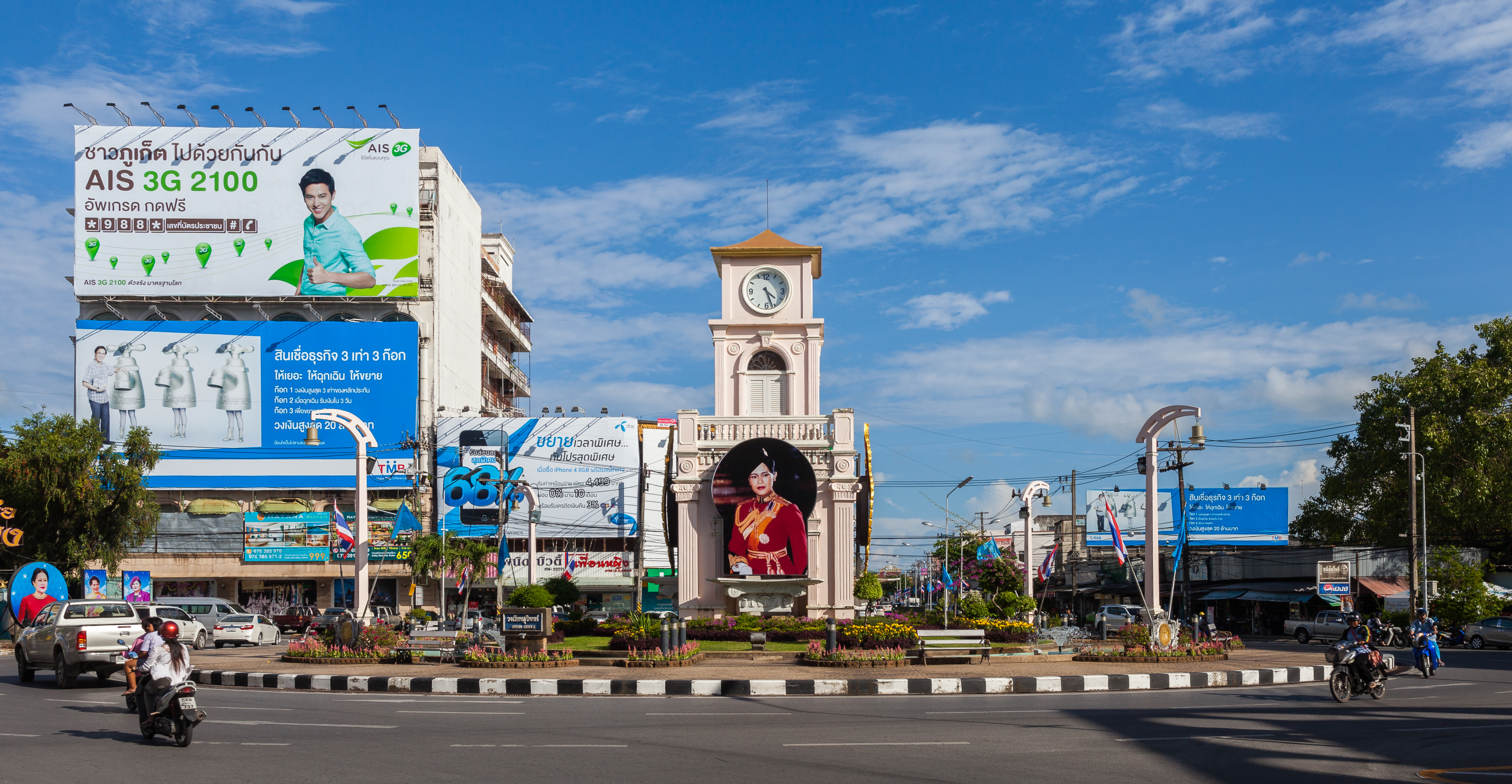

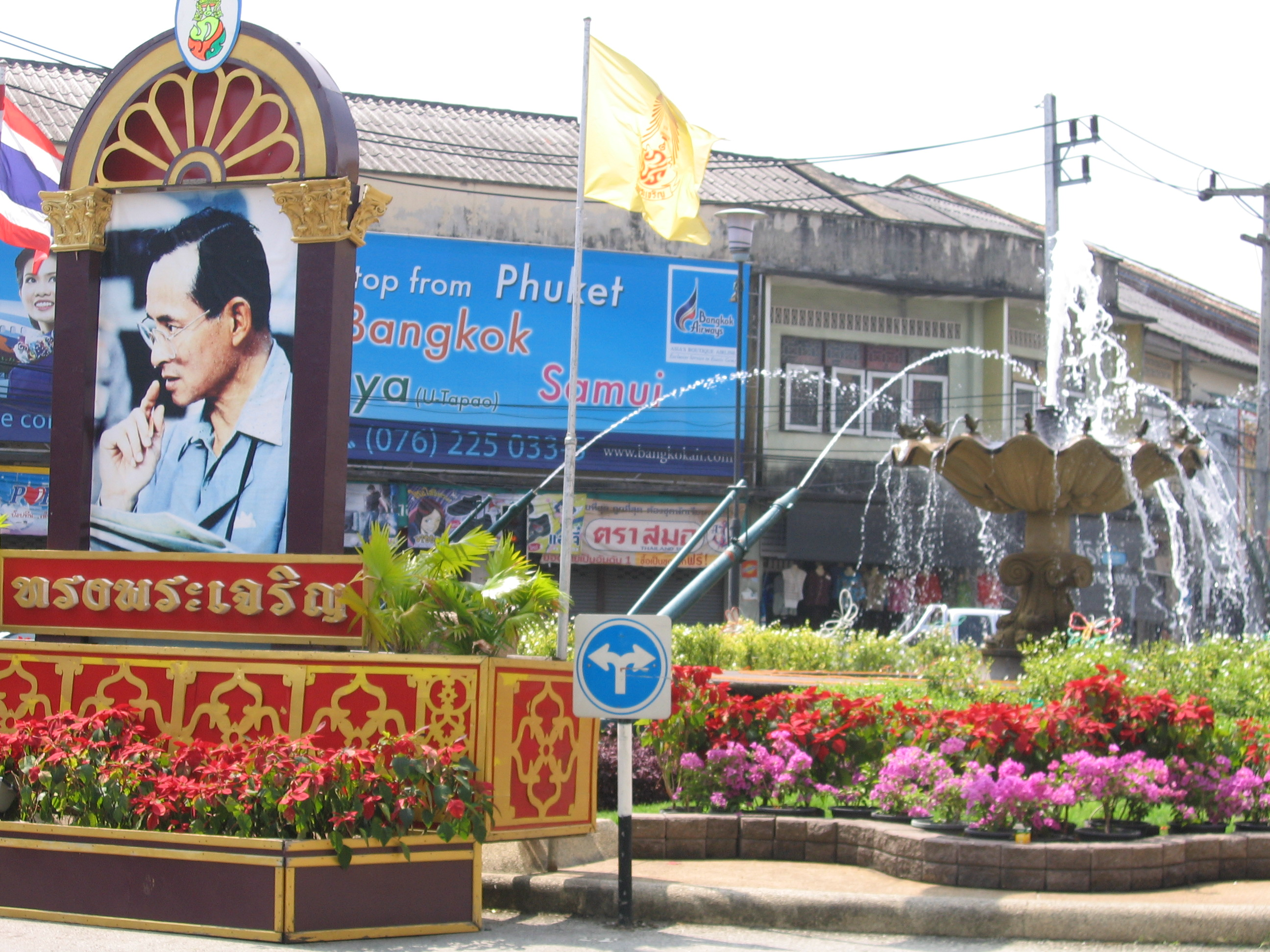

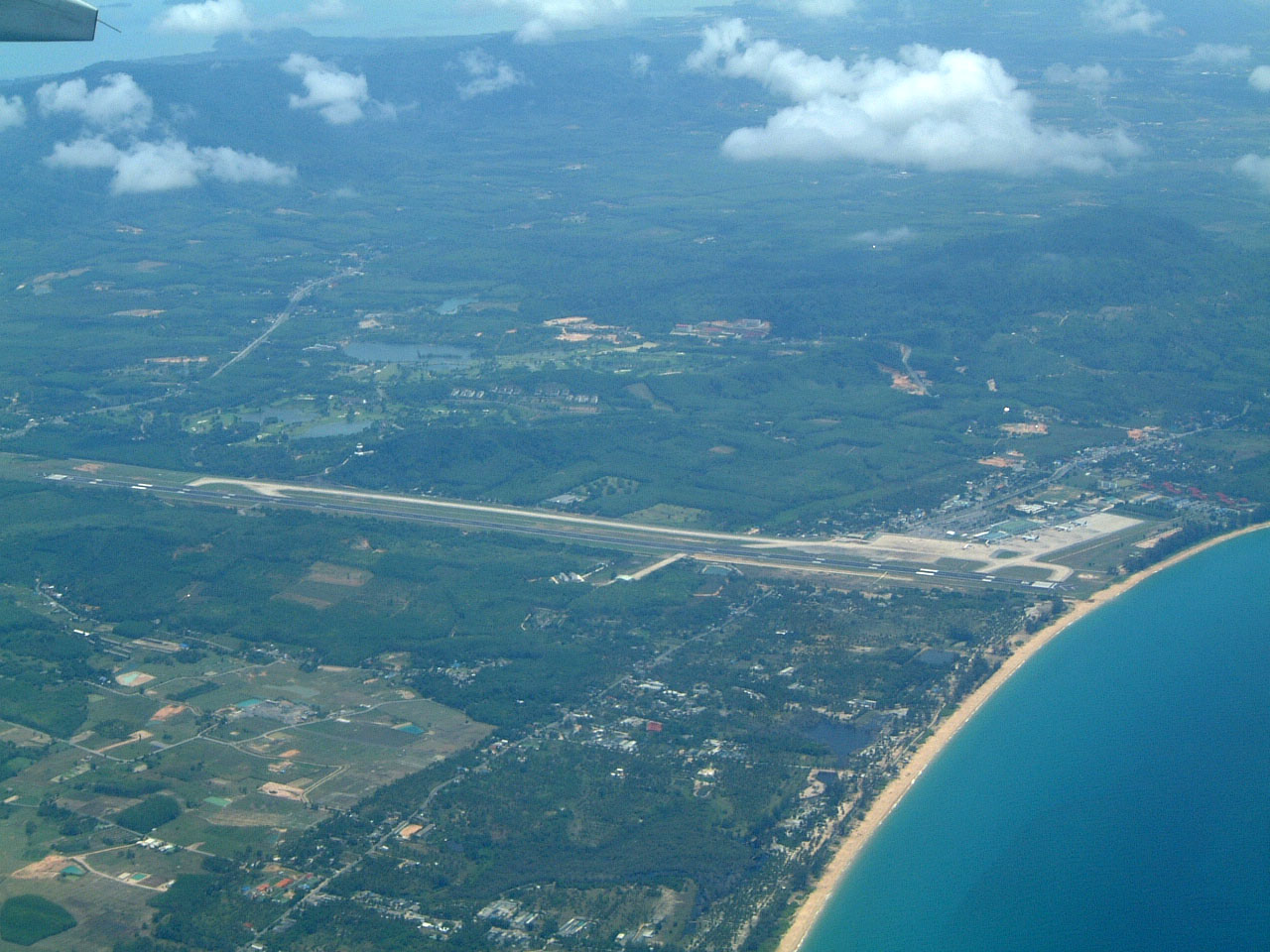

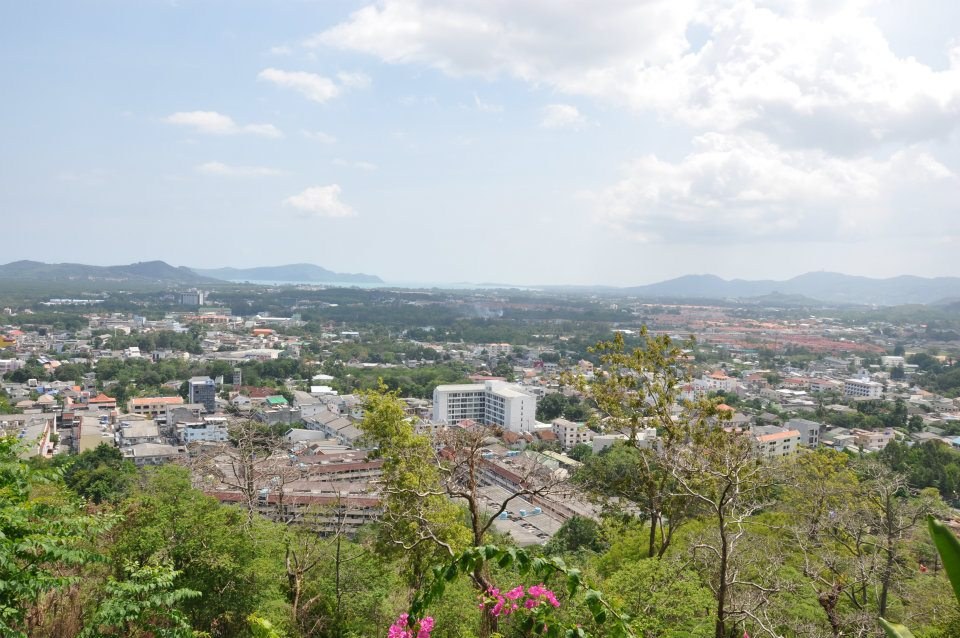

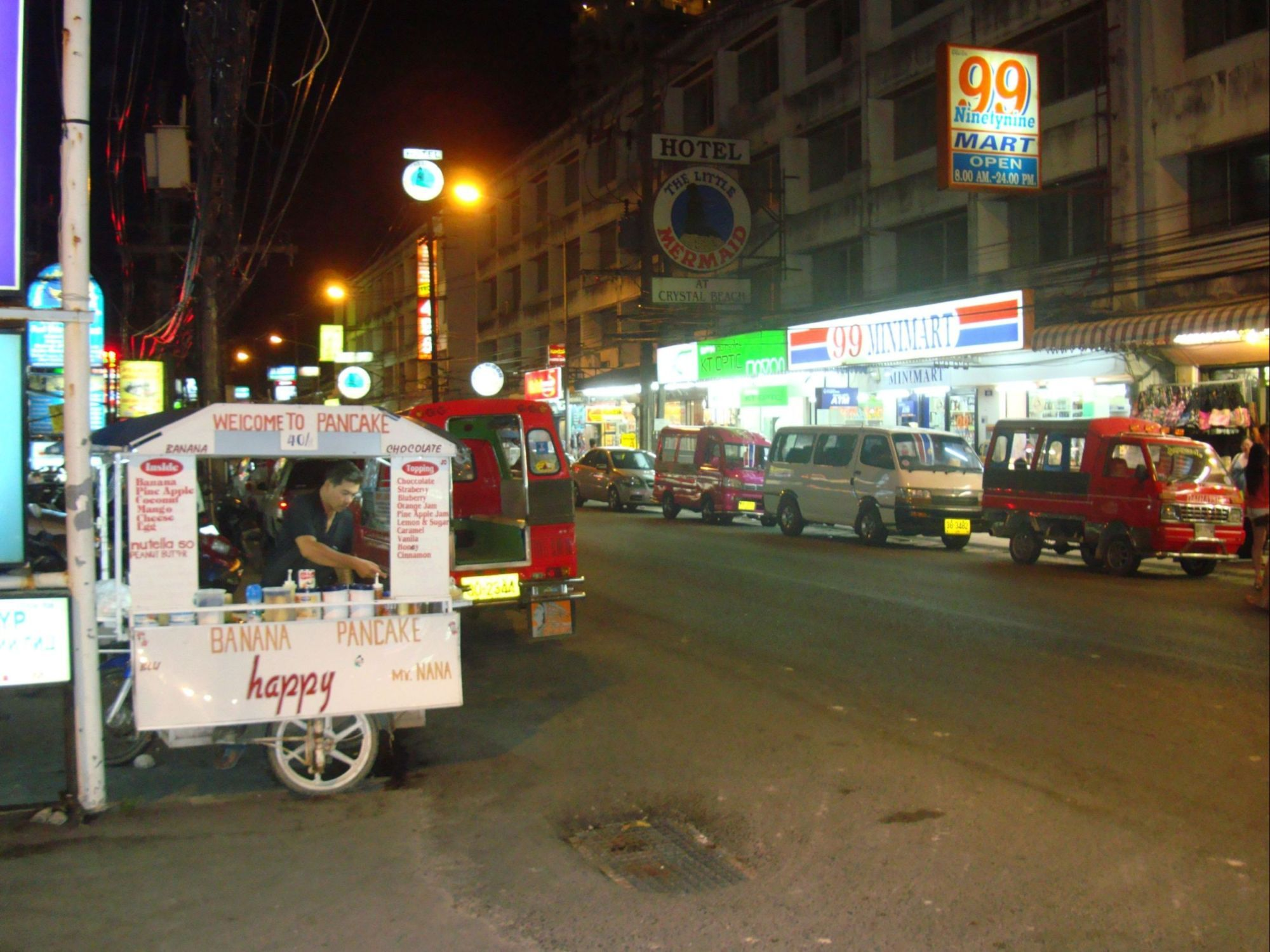

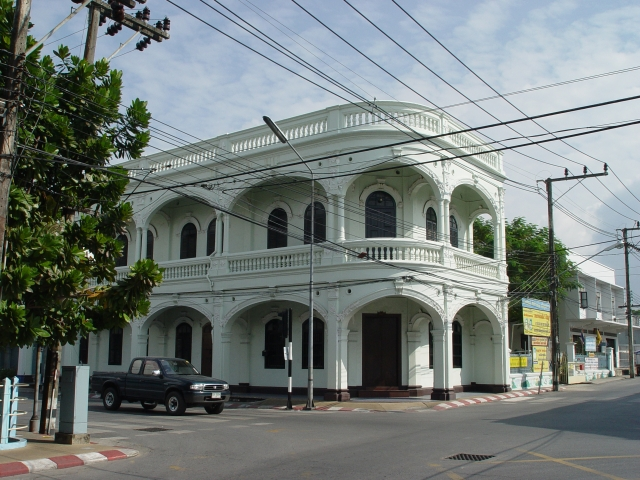

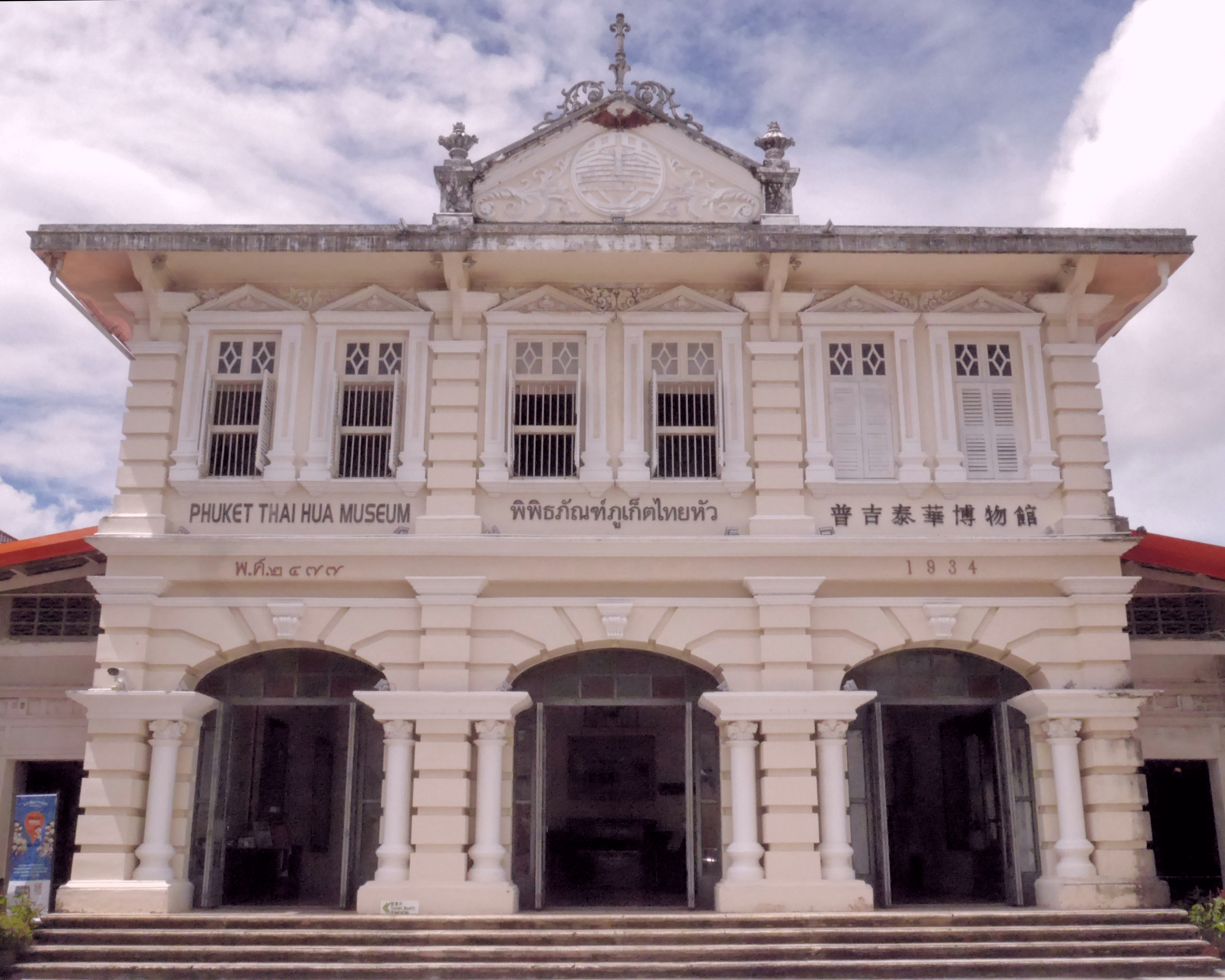

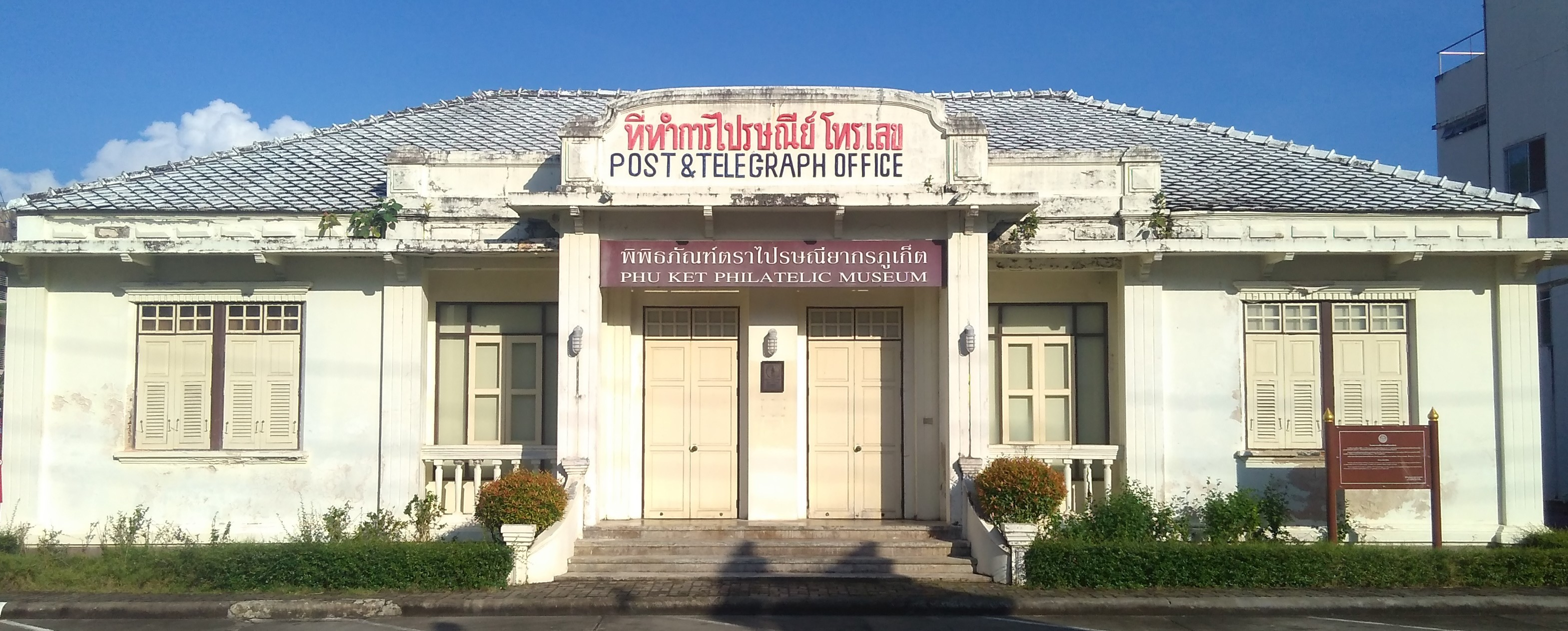

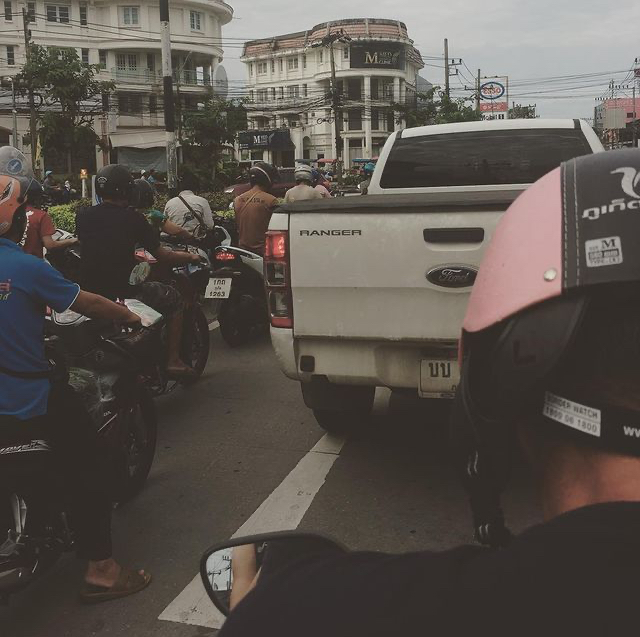

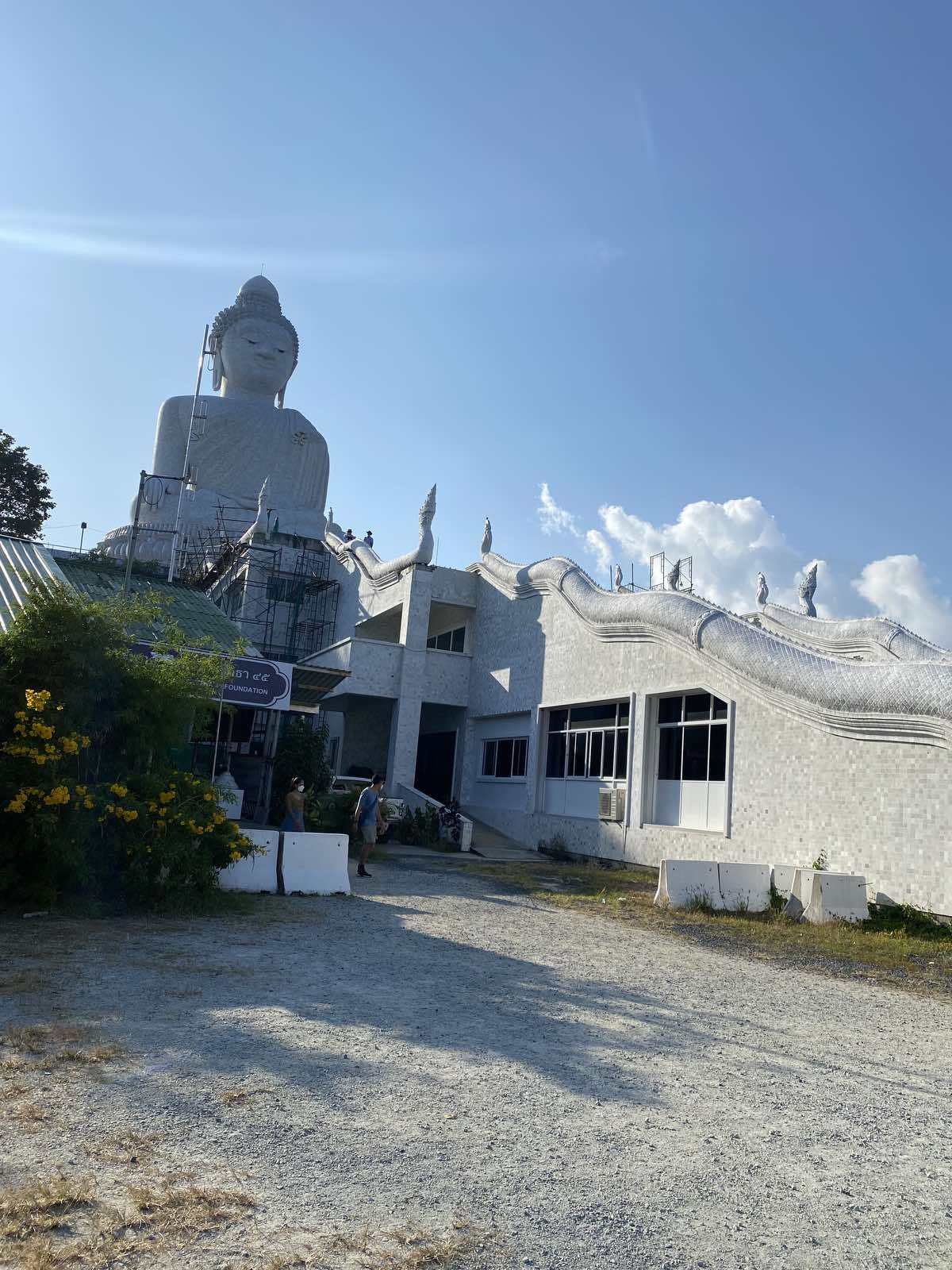
Buddha statue on Khao Rang hill

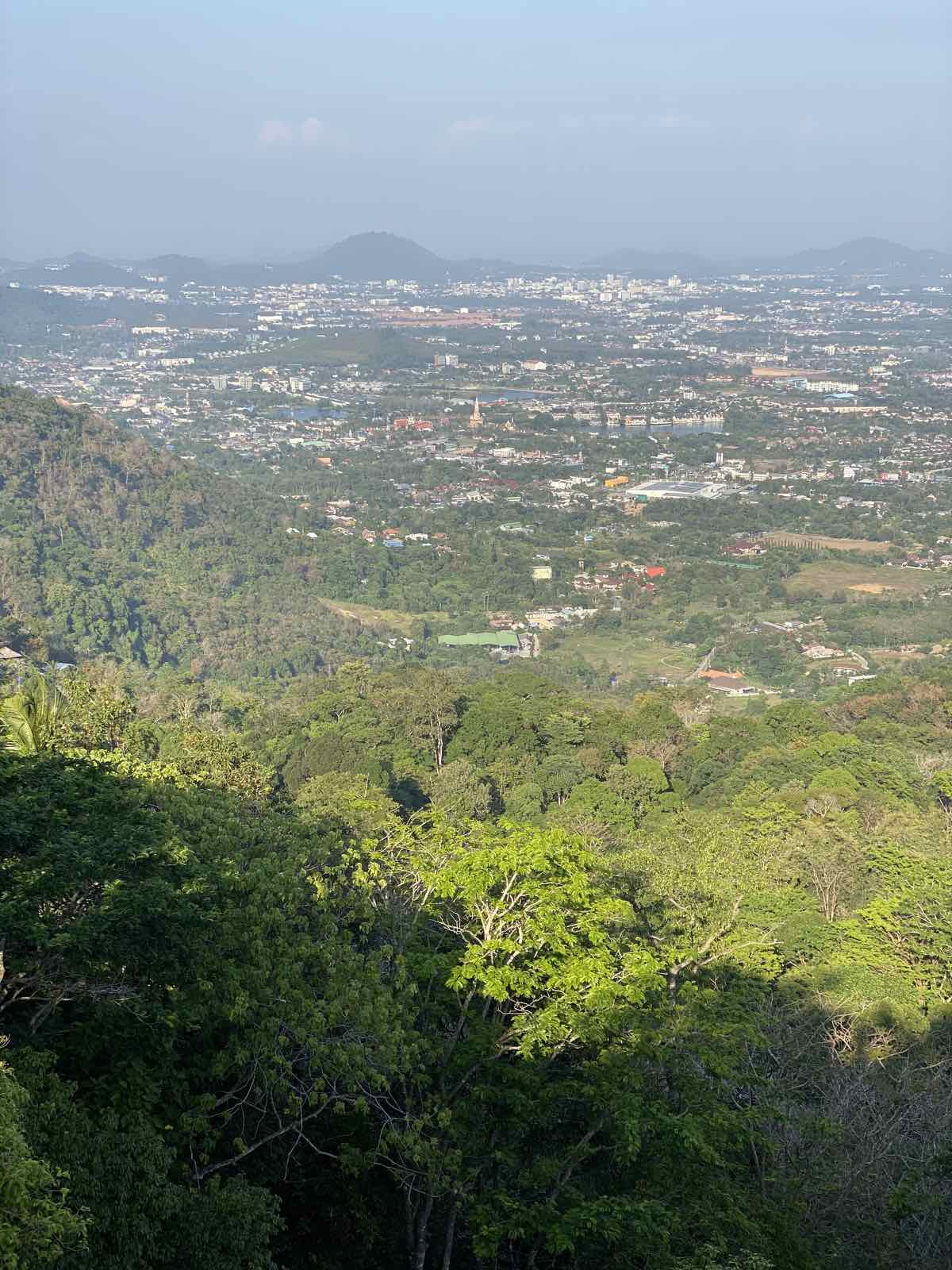
View of Phuket city from Khao Rang hill
