= Sino-Portuguese architecture =

Asian hybrid architecture style

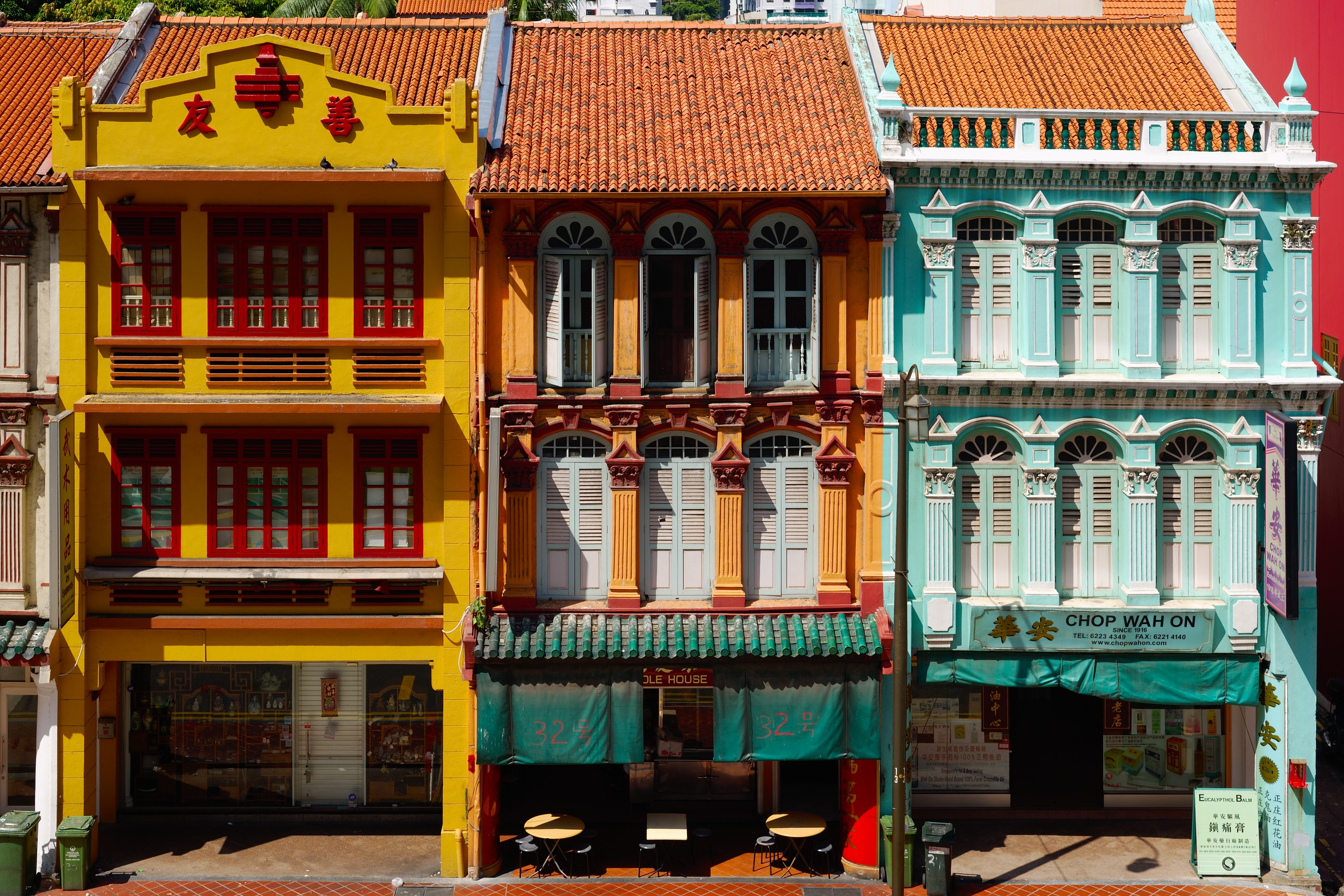
Sino-Portuguese-styled shophouses are most prominent in Singapore, especially at its Chinatown. The facade of the leftmost example was remodeled in a late-Art Deco style.

Sino-Portuguese architecture, also known as Chinese Baroque, Straits/Singapore Eclectic architecture or Peranakan architecture is an Asian hybrid style incorporating elements of both Chinese and Portuguese architectural styles. It is common in urban centers where Chinese settlers lived in southern China and the Peranakans of the Malay Peninsula, with examples found and most prominently conserved and maintained in Singapore.

Historical areas with such architecture can also be found throughout Malay Peninsula, Southern Thailand (primarily Phuket), Macau, Medan, Vietnam and Hainan (primarily Haikou). In many of these places however, such structures have either been demolished or are in a state of disrepair.

== Sino-Portuguese style ==
The characteristics of Sino-Portuguese architecture is a mix of European and Chinese styles or simply colonial architecture. These older buildings were built by the Chinese coolies. The building has the design (painting) in Chinese format, but the structure is Portuguese. Typically, the building is a one or two storey mixed commercial-residential building. The wall has strength due to the weight of the tiles on the roof. The roof is clad in curved tiles of Chinese provenance.

In contemporary Singapore, such structures are conserved and maintained regularly, making them a huge tourist attraction for foreigners unacquainted with such structures. Its historical heritage as well as its location in the city-centre also makes them highly valuable.

== Sino-Portuguese history in Phuket ==
The old town in Phuket has a history as the center of a tin mining and trading province. In the era of Western imperialism, after 1511 (2054 BE), Portuguese settlers came to Phuket and to the trade port of Malacca. The settlers brought Western culture with them, including their technologies, religion, and their own architectural styles. Portuguese settlers employed Chinese workers to build their houses and establishments. These structures mixed Portuguese and Chinese art styles together, giving rise to Sino-Portuguese architecture.

== Gallery ==
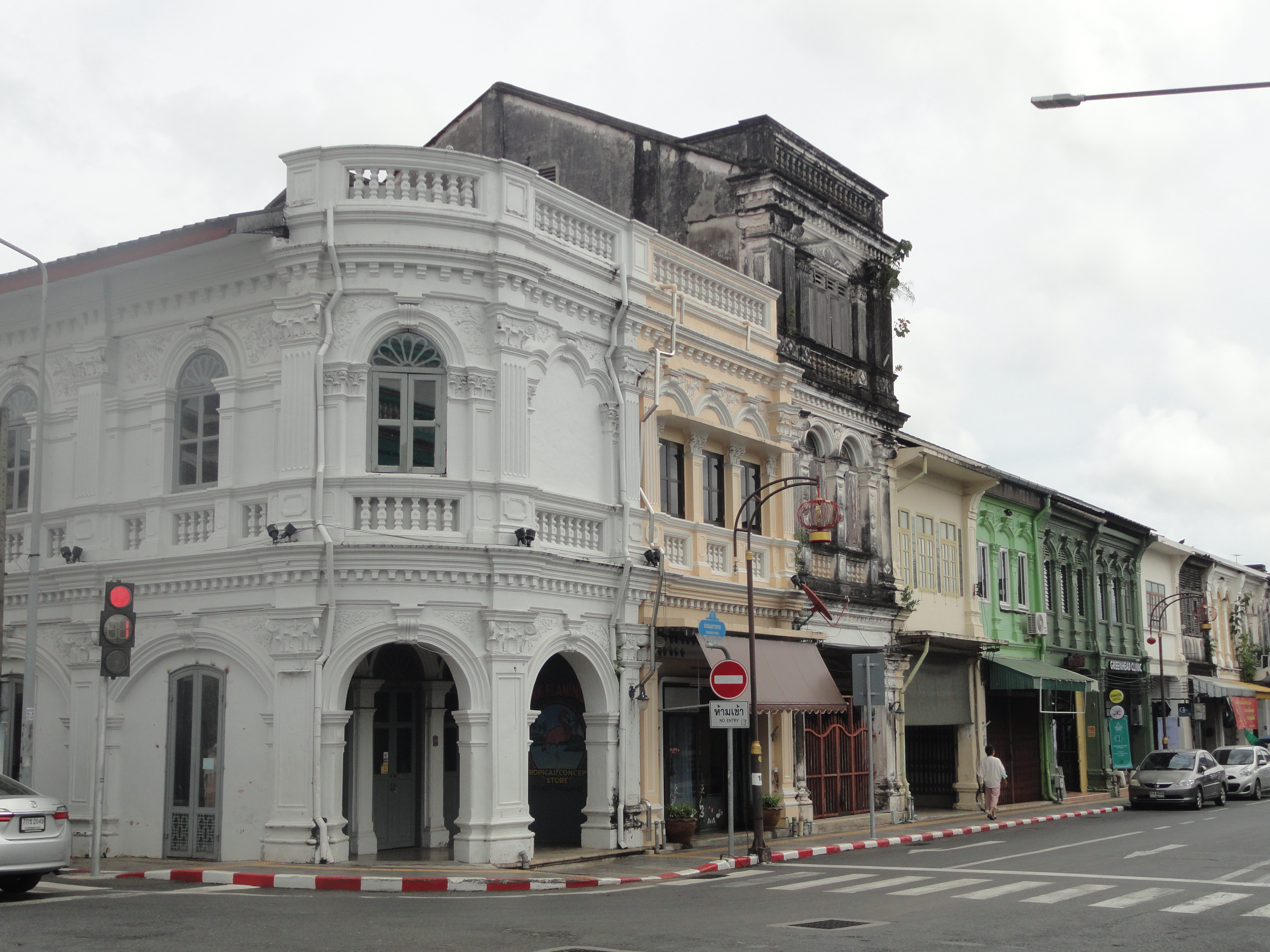
Sino-Portuguese architecture, Dibuk Road, Phuket City, Thailand

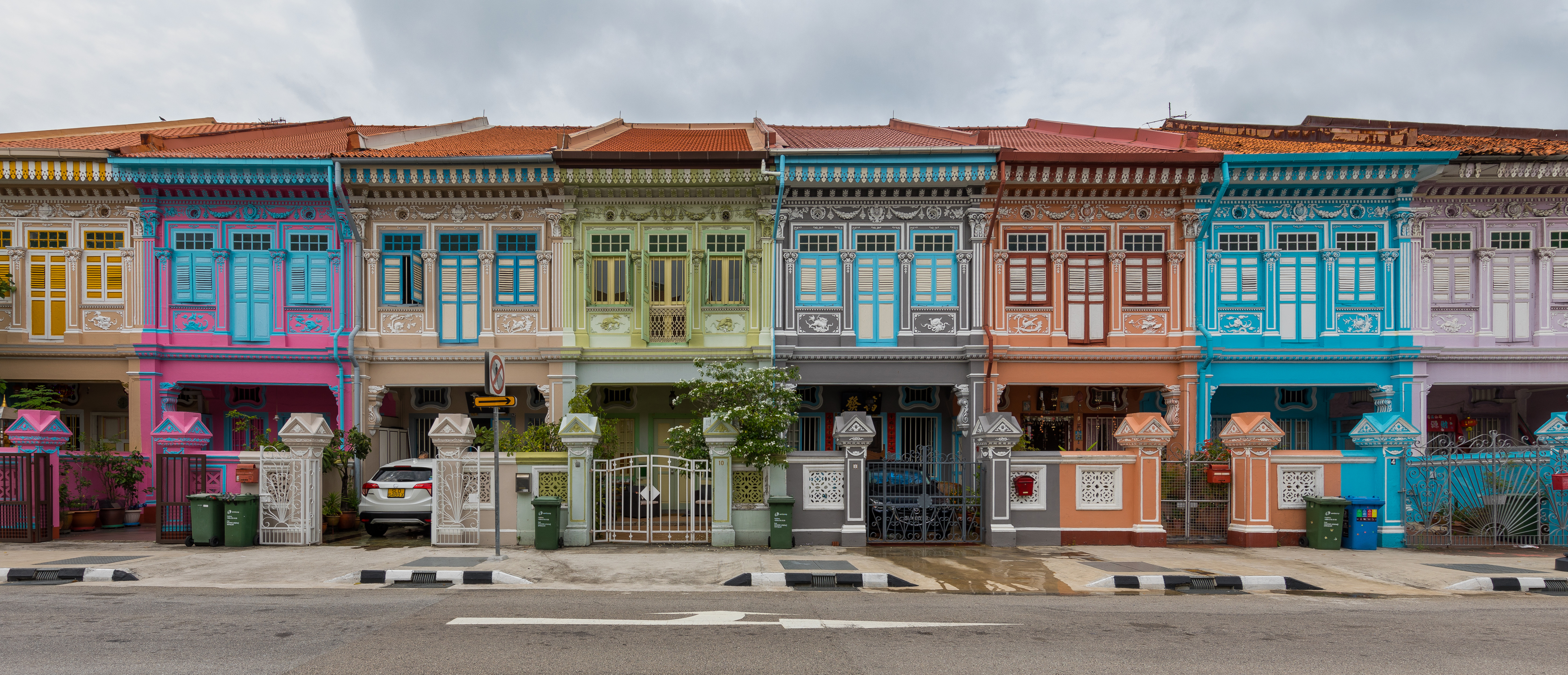
Colourful shophouses at Koon Seng Road, Singapore

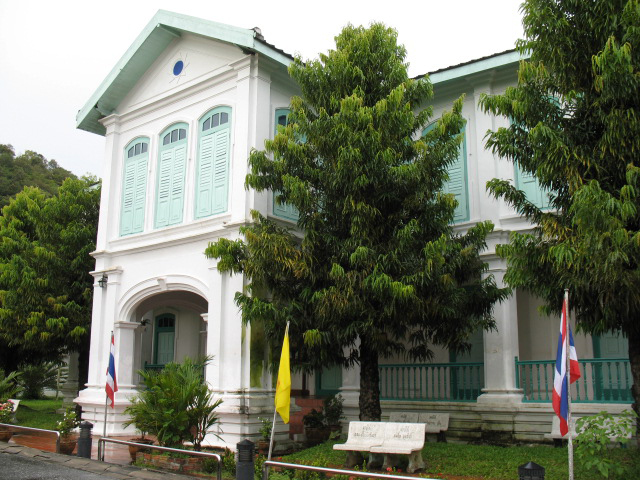
Kuden Mansion in Satun, Thailand, an example of a box layout Sino-Portuguese mansion. The building now houses the Satun National Museum.

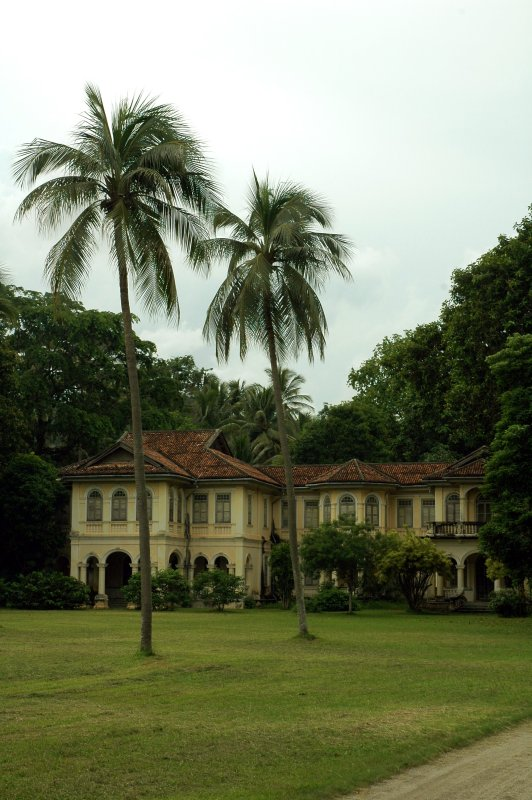
Governor's Mansion in Phuket City represents a contrast to Kuden Mansion, with a more extensive layout.

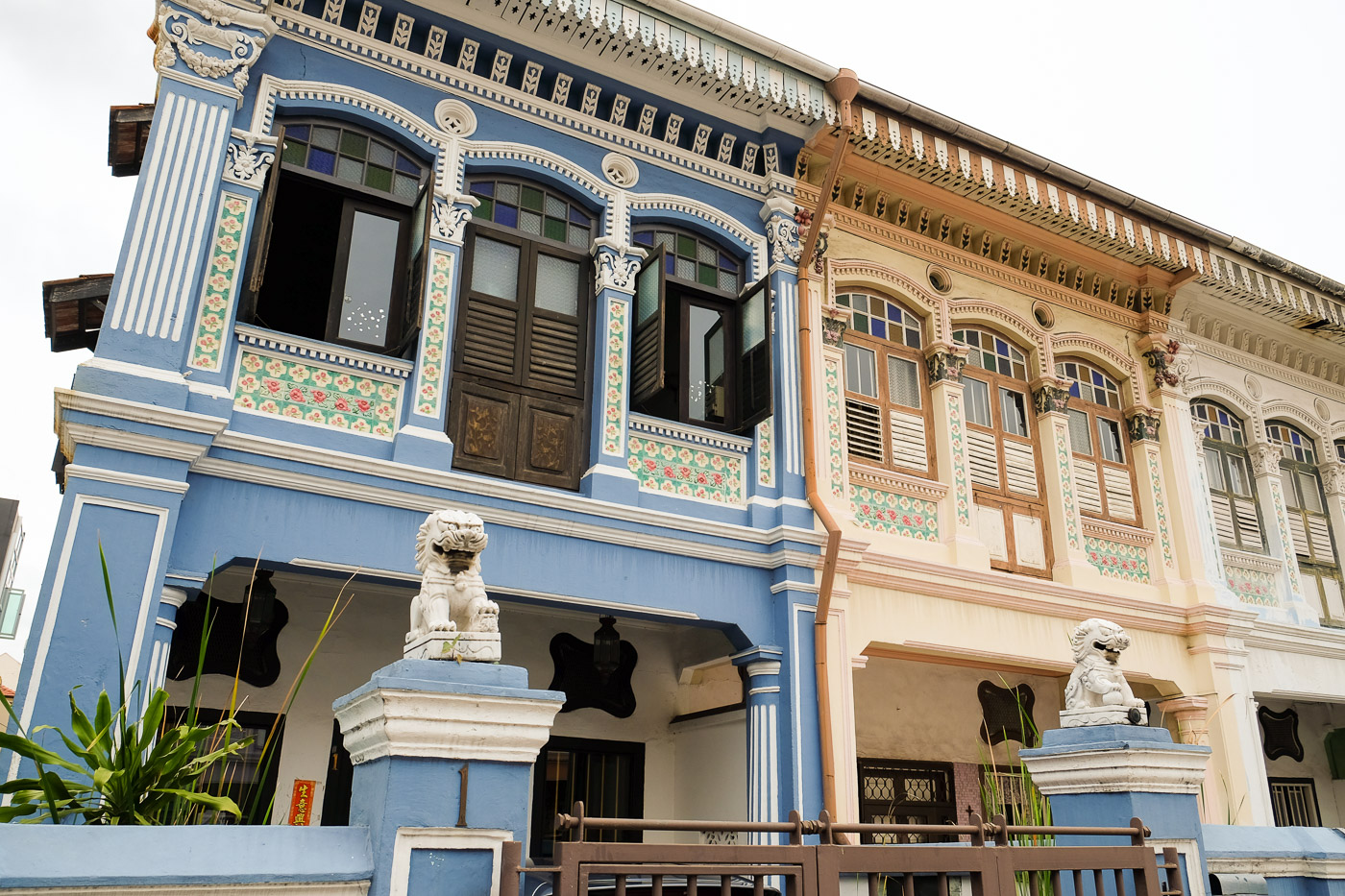
District such as Katong, Singapore, incorporates many ornamental elements of mansion designs in the Sino-Portuguese style.

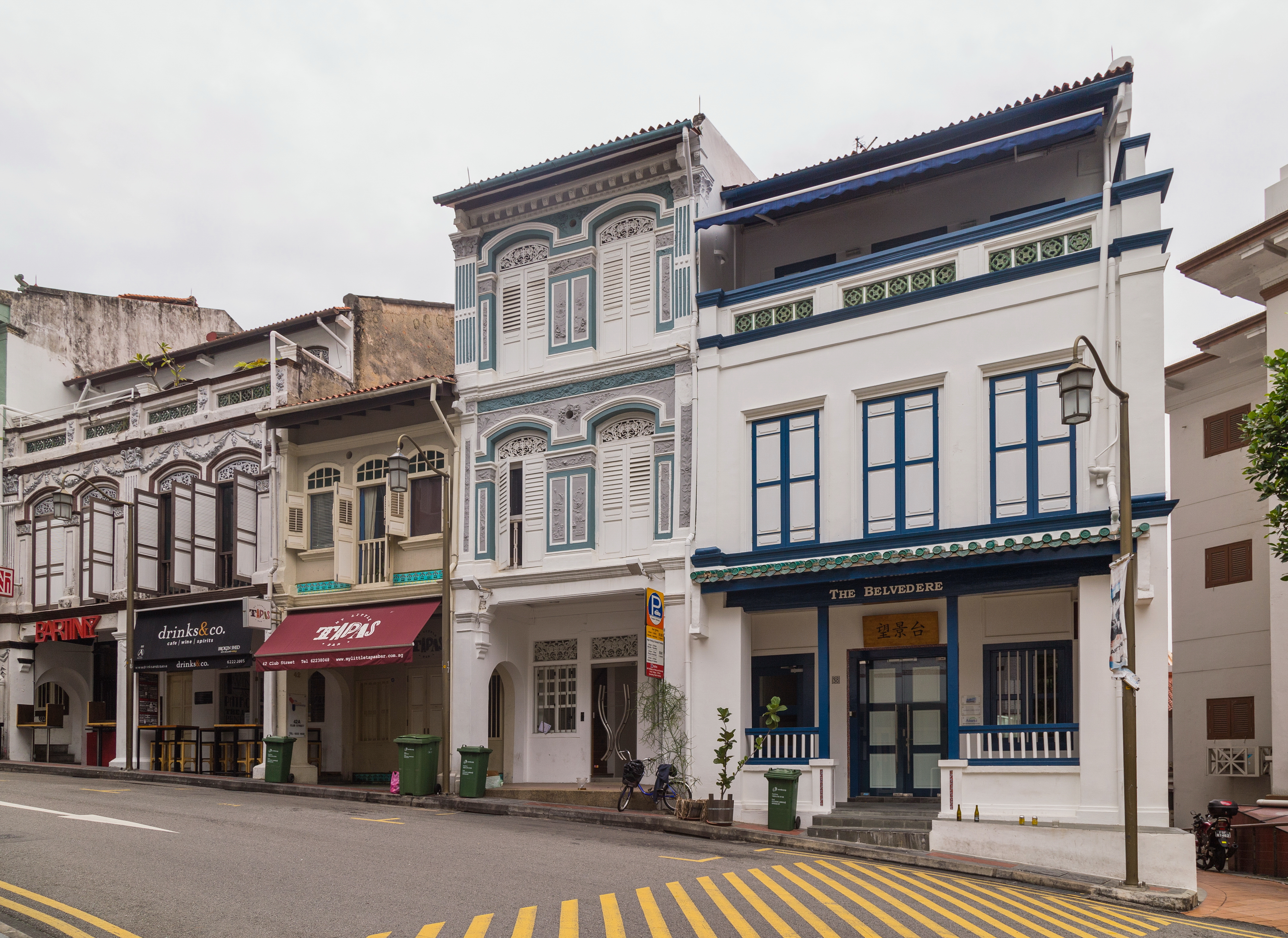
Club Street townhouses, Singapore. Some of the buildings incorporate open balconies on the third floor.

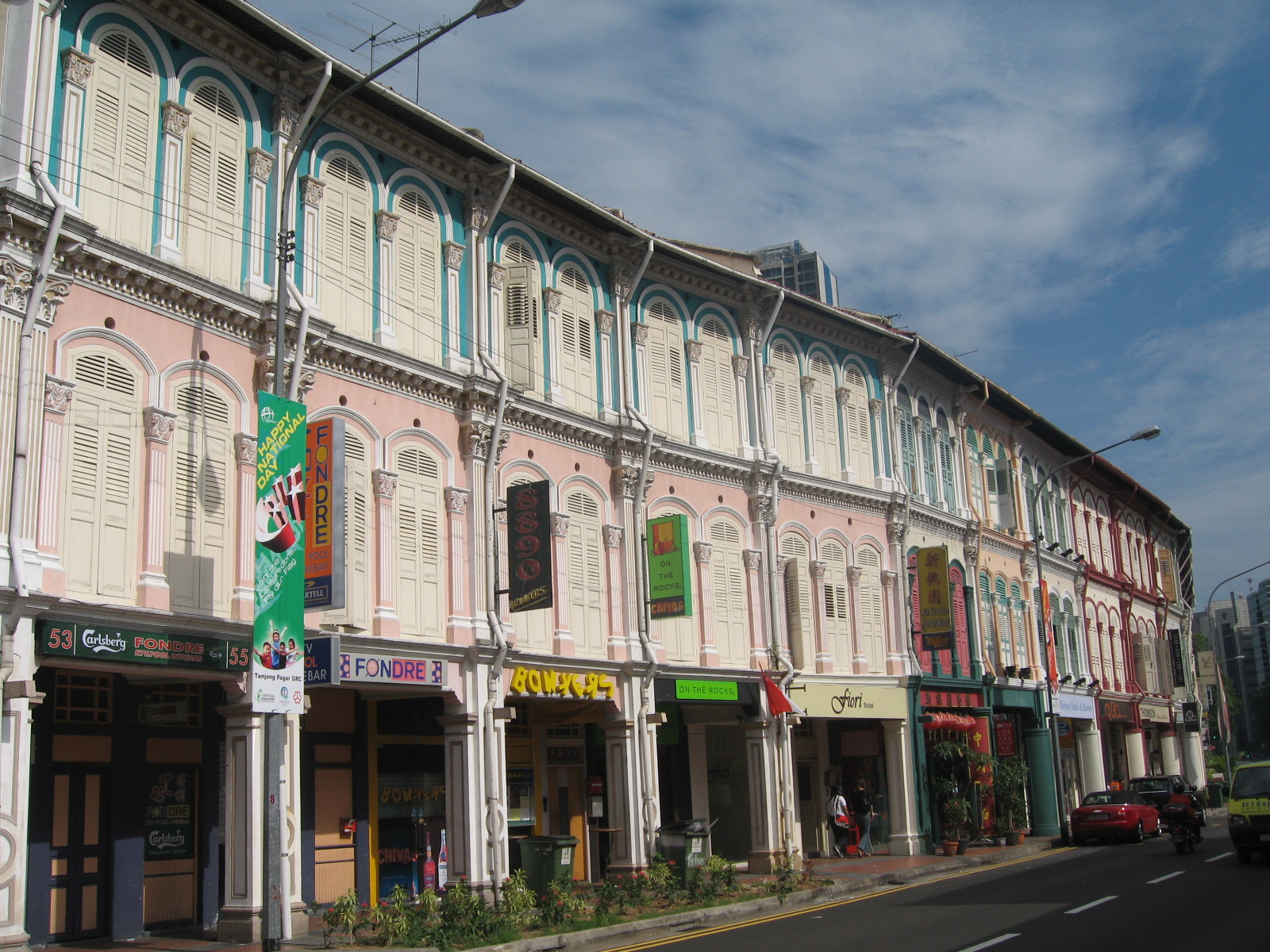
Tanjong Pagar Road shophouses, illustrating three-storey varieties of Straits architecture.

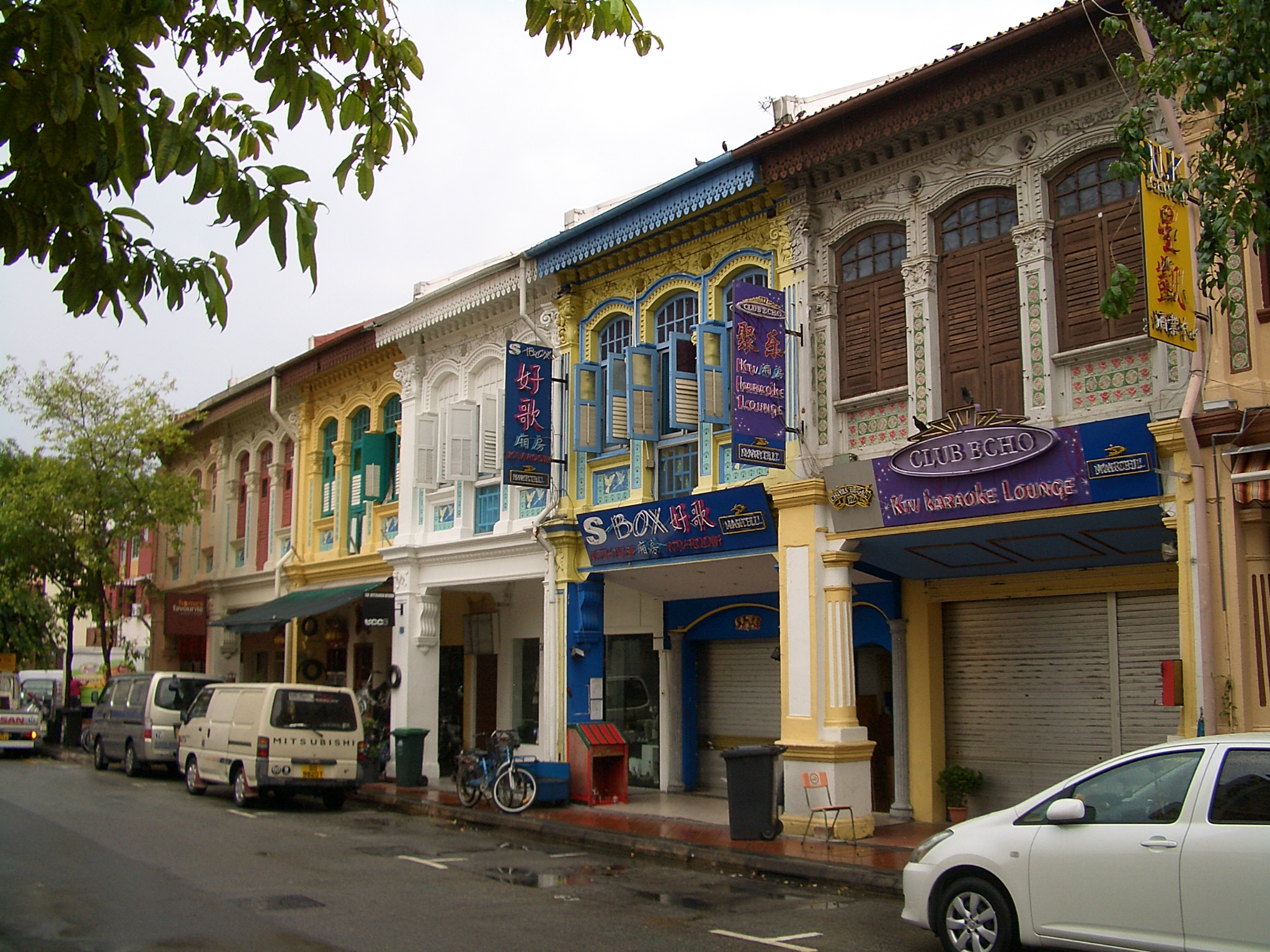
Double storey shophouses at Joo Chiat Lane, a common design in the outer reaches of urban Singapore.

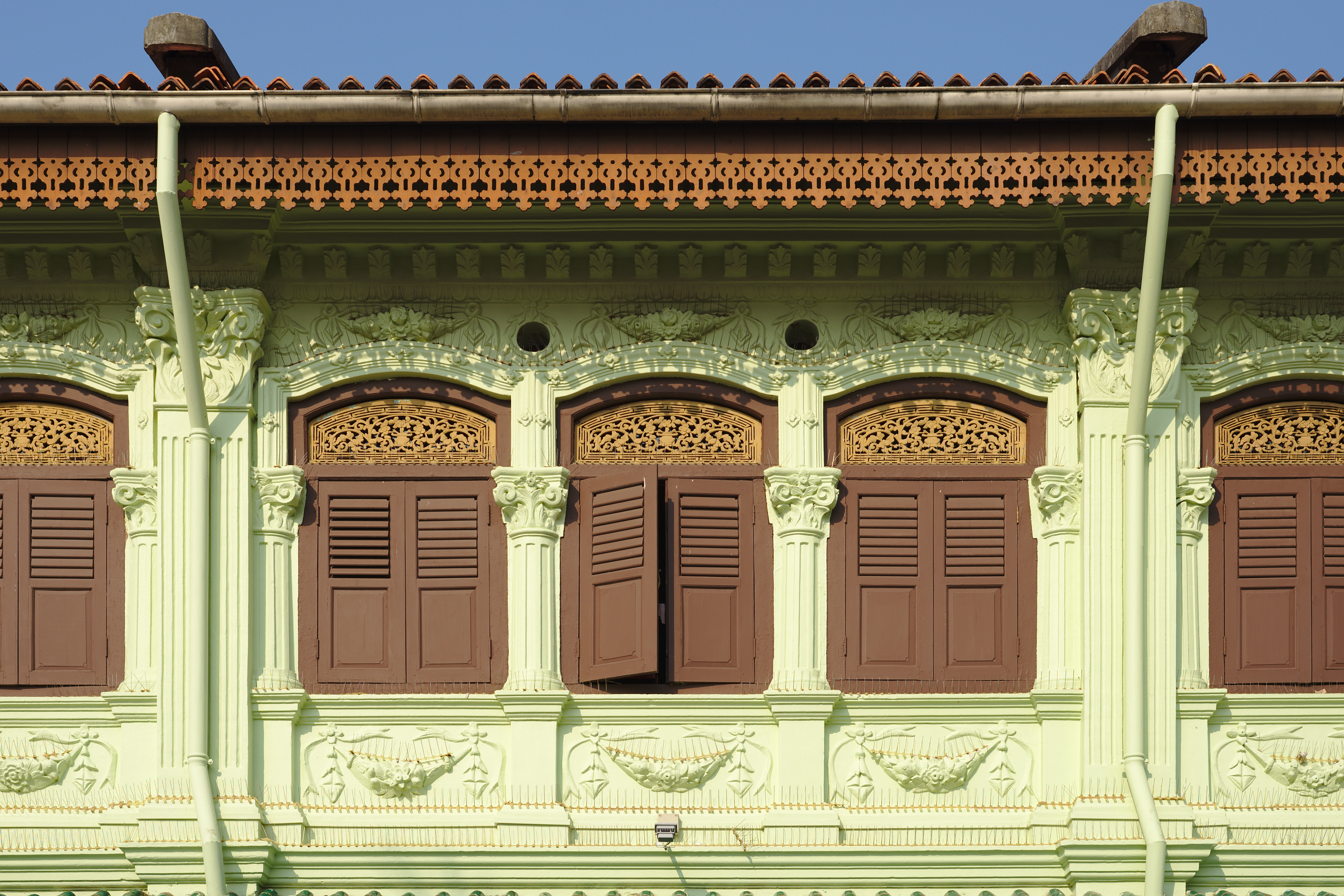
Ornamentation of a shophouse around Arab Street, Singapore. Elaborate ornamentation is typically a mark of wealth for the owner who commissioned the construction of the building.

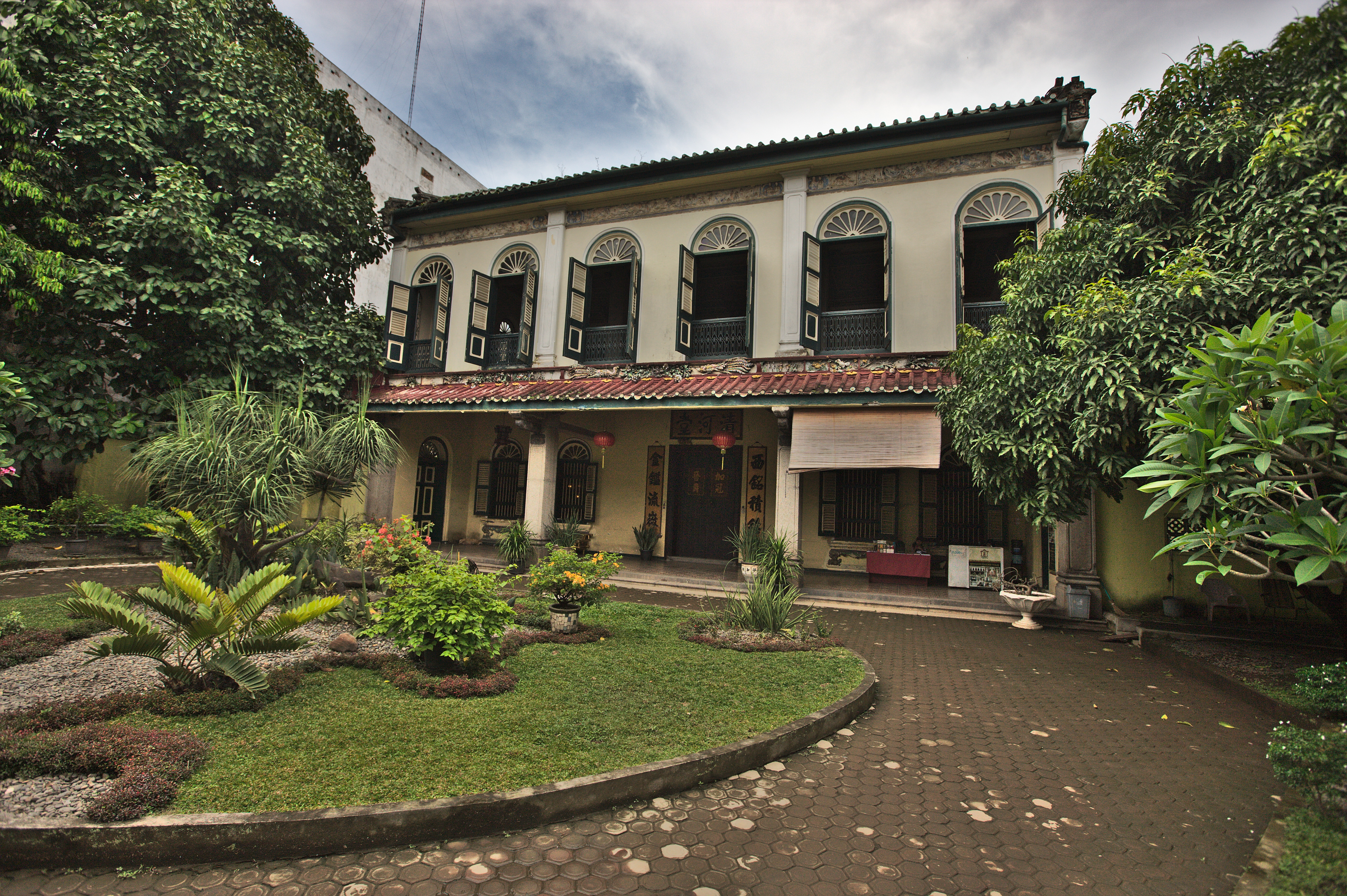
Tjong A Fie Mansion, Medan, Indonesia, a rarer example of Sino-Portuguese architecture in the country.

== See also ==
- Architecture of Singapore
- Bahay na Bato
- Malay houses
- Nipa hut
- Rumah adat
- Shophouse
- Tong lau
