= Black tin =

Tin ore

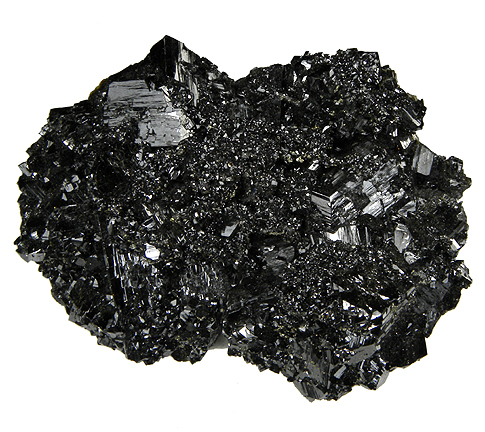
A lump of "black tin", so called because of its color; in this case it is cassiterite from Cornwall

Black tin is the raw ore of tin, usually cassiterite, as sold by a tin mine to a smelting company. After mining, the ore must be concentrated by several processes to reduce the amount of gangue it contains before it can be sold. It contrasts with white tin, which is the refined, metallic tin produced after smelting.

The term "black tin" was historically associated with tin mining in Devon and Cornwall.
