= White tin =

Metallic allotrope of tin

White tin is refined metallic tin. It contrasts with black tin, which is unrefined tin ore (cassiterite) as extracted from the ground. The term "white tin" was historically associated with tin mining in Devon and Cornwall where it was smelted from black tin in blowing houses.

White tin may also refer specifically to β-tin, the metallic allotrope of the pure element, as opposed to the nonmetallic allotrope α-tin (also known as gray tin), which occurs at temperatures below 13.2 °C (55.8 °F), a transformation known as tin pest). White tin has tetragonal unit cell.
