= Tin mining =

Process of extracting tin from the ground

Tin mining began early in the Bronze Age, as bronze is a copper-tin alloy. Tin is a relatively rare element in the Earth's crust, with approximately 2 ppm (parts per million), compared to iron with 50,000 ppm.

== History ==
Tin extraction and use can be dated to the beginnings of the Bronze Age around 3000 BC, when it was observed that copper objects formed of polymetallic ores with different metal contents had different physical properties. The earliest bronze objects had tin or arsenic content of less than 2% and are therefore believed to be the result of unintentional alloying due to trace metal content in the copper ore It was soon discovered that the addition of tin or arsenic to copper increased its hardness and made casting much easier, which revolutionized metal working techniques and brought humanity from the Copper Age or Chalcolithic to the Bronze Age around 3000 BC. Early tin exploitation appears to have been centered on placer deposits of cassiterite.

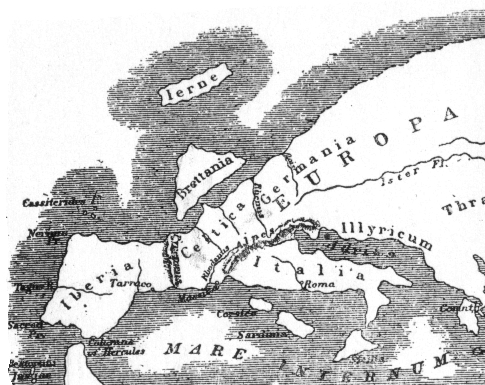
Map of Europe based on Strabo's geography, showing the Cassiterides just off the northwest tip of Iberia where Herodotus believed tin originated in 450 BC

The first evidence of tin use for making bronze appears in the Near East and the Balkans around 3000 BC. It is still unclear where the earliest tin was mined, as tin deposits are very rare and evidence of early mining is scarce. Afghanistan was a major source of tin for prehistoric bronze production. Europe's earliest mining district appears to be located in the Ore Mountains, on the border between Germany and Czech Republic and is dated to 2500 BC. From there tin was traded north to the Baltic Sea and south to the Mediterranean following the Amber Road trading route. Tin mining knowledge spread to other European tin mining districts from the Ore Mountains and evidence of tin mining begins to appear in Brittany, Devon and Cornwall, and in the Iberian Peninsula around 2000 BC. These deposits saw greater exploitation when they fell under Roman control between the third century BC and the first century AD. Demand for tin created a large and thriving network among Mediterranean cultures of classical times. By the medieval period, Iberia's and Germany's deposits lost importance and were largely forgotten while Devon and Cornwall began dominating the European tin market.

In the Far East, the tin belt stretching from Yunnan in China to the Malay Peninsula began being exploited sometime between the third and second millennium BC. The deposits in Yunnan were not mined until around 700 BC, but by the Han dynasty had become the main source of tin in China according to historical texts of the Han, Jin, Tang, and Song dynasties.

Other regions of the world developed tin mining industries at a much later date. In Africa, the Bantu culture extracted, smelted and exported tin between the 11th and 15th centuries AD, in the Americas tin exploitation began around 1000 AD, and in Australia it began with the arrival of Europeans in the 18th century.

=== Modern times ===
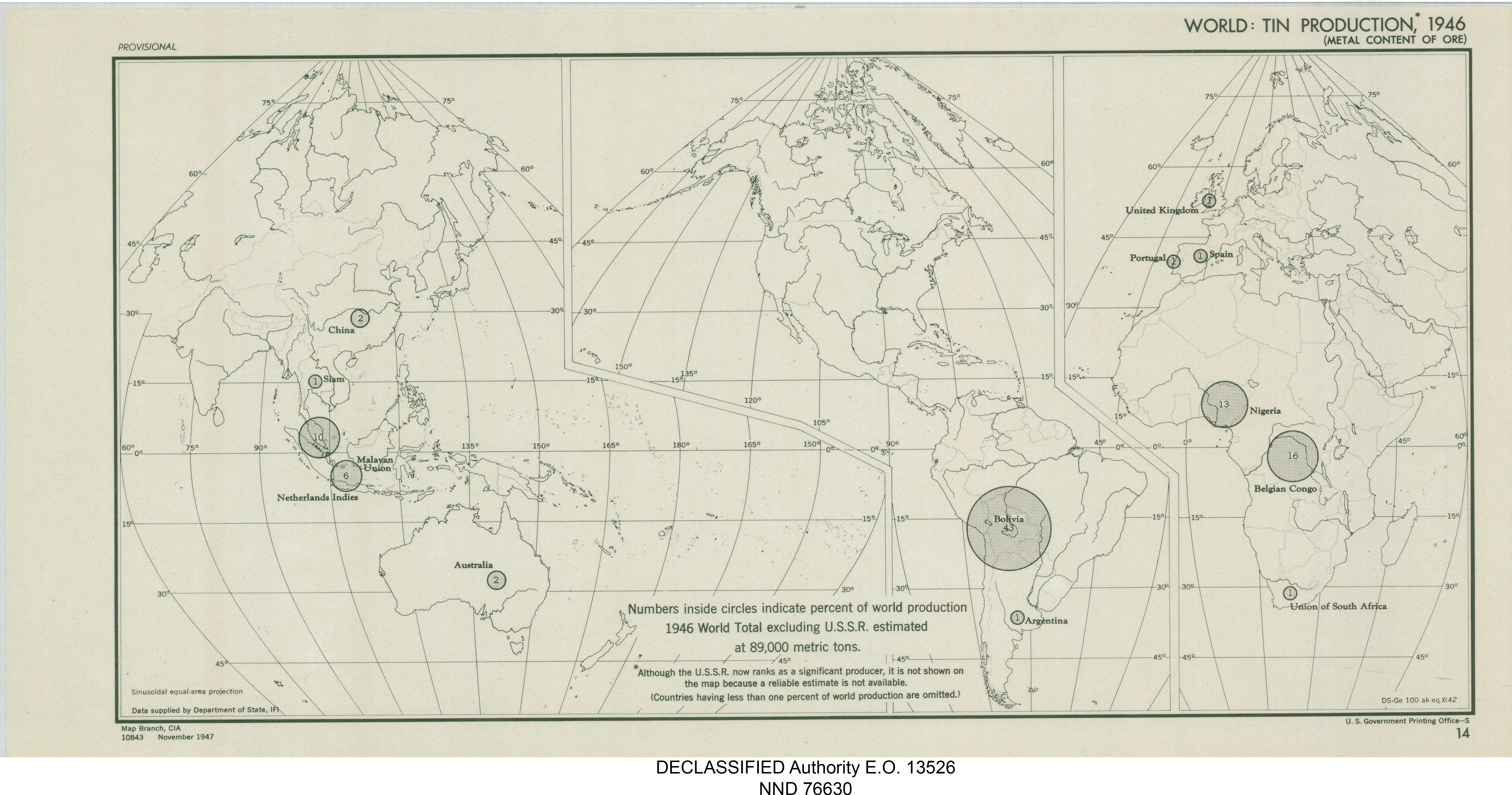
World tin production, 1946

During the Middle Ages, and again in the early 19th century, Cornwall was the major tin producer. This changed after large amounts of tin were found in the Bolivian tin belt and the east Asian tin belt, stretching from China through Thailand and Laos to Malaya and Indonesia. Tasmania also hosts deposits of historical importance, most notably Mount Bischoff and Renison Bell.

In 1931 the tin producers founded the International Tin Committee, followed in 1956 by the International Tin Council, an institution to control the tin market. After the collapse of the market in October 1985 the price for tin nearly halved.

Tin foil was once a common wrapping material for foods and drugs; replaced in the early 20th century by the use of aluminium foil, which is now commonly referred to as tin foil, hence one use of the slang term "tinnie" or "tinny" for a small aluminium open boat, a small pipe for use of a drug such as cannabis, or for a can of beer. Today, the word "tin" is often improperly used as a generic term for any silvery metal that comes in sheets. Most everyday materials that are commonly called "tin", such as aluminium foil, beverage cans, corrugated building sheathing and tin cans, are actually made of steel or aluminium, although tin cans (tinned cans) do contain a thin coating of tin to inhibit rust. Likewise, so-called "tin toys" are usually made of steel, and may have a coating of tin to inhibit rust. The original Ford Model T was known colloquially as the "Tin Lizzy".

==== Electronics ====
Because tin is used in solder, it is crucial to computers, smartphones, and all other electronic equipment. (For example, the Apple iPad uses 1–3 grams of tin in its 7000 solder points.) According to Apple Inc., tin is the most common metal used by that company's suppliers.

== Economics ==
In 2006, total worldwide tin mine production was 321,000 tons, and smelter production was 340,000 tons. From its production level of 186,300 tons in 1991, around where it had hovered for the previous decades, production of tin increased 89% to 351,800 tons in 2005. Most of the increase came from China and Indonesia, with the largest spike in 2004–2005, when it increased 23%. While in the 1970s Malaysia was the largest producer, with around a third of world production, it has steadily fallen, and now remains a major smelter and market center. In 2007, the People's Republic of China was the largest producer of tin, where the tin deposits are concentrated in the southeast Yunnan tin belt, with 43% of the world's share, followed by Indonesia, with an almost equal share, and Peru at a distant third, reports the USGS.

== Future supply of tin ==
New deposits to support future production are somewhat limited. A significant new source of tin supply may come from the very high grade (>4% Sn) Alphamin Resources Bisie project in DRC, new discoveries in Myanmar and from Russia, primarily from the Komsomolsk Tin District in Khabarovsk Region. The Sobolinoye (Sable) Deposit, licensed to Sable Tin Resources is one of the main potential suppliers of tin in the near future. The deposit holds over 10 million tonnes at 0.88% tin (93000 tonnes) and 0.53% Copper. The resources were registered in 1987 and a feasibility study prepared in 1993 by a subsidiary of Norilsk Nickel but despite its vicinity to infrastructure a mine was never constructed due to economic and political reasons. The private Rusolovo holding company is also another potential major supplier as it ramps up production from its high grade (1.5% Sn) Pravoumirskoye mine, which is overcoming infrastructure obstacles. Another is the historical lower grade (0.6% Sn) Festivalnoye deposit which has recently re-commenced production; ore from this is being processed at the Gorniy processing plant; a third Russian source would be the Khinganskoye tailings project in the Jewish Autonomous Republic.

The table below shows the countries with the largest mine production and the largest smelter output. (Note: Estimates vary between USGS and The British Geological Survey. The latter was chosen because it indicates that the most recent statistics are not estimates, and estimates match more closely with other estimates found for Congo-Kinshasa.) Further supplies may possibly come from the DRC, Nigeria and Rwanda.

Mine and smelter production (tons), 2006
Country	Mine production	Smelter production
Indonesia	117,500	80,933
China	114,300	129,400
Peru	38,470	40,495
Bolivia	17,669	13,500
Australia*	7072	0
Thailand	225	27,540
Malaysia	2,398	23,000
Belgium	0	8,000
Russia	5,000	5,500
Congo-Kinshasa ('08)	15,000	0

[*Results from 2014 Australian F.Y]

After the discovery of tin in what is now Bisie, North Kivu in the Democratic Republic of the Congo in 2002, illegal production has increased there to around 15,000 tons. This is largely fuelling the ongoing and recent conflicts there, as well as affecting international markets. Tin is a conflict mineral, as defined by the US legislation to stop tin mining for causing conflicts.

== Social and environmental impact ==
In August 2012 cover story in Bloomberg Businessweek stated that tin mining on the Indonesian island of Bangka was becoming more dangerous and destructive as cassiterite ore deposits became harder to get to. About one-third of all the tin mined in the world has come from Bangka and its sister island Belitung to the east.

As tin ore pits become deeper, the number of lethal cave-ins has risen. Approximately one tin miner a week was killed in Indonesia in 2011 — double the number of the year before. The low income of the miners and the mining operations—pickaxes and buckets are often the equipment used to gather the ore, and $5 US equivalent is a successful day's work—have meant safety measures such as terracing of pits have been ignored.

In addition, attacks by saltwater crocodiles are frequent in many of the pools around tin mines on both Bangka and Belitung. The islands have some of the highest rates of crocodile attack in the world, many occurring around tin mines and on mine workers.

Dredging for ore off the islands shores has churned up sediment which has buried coral reefs where fish live and harmed the local fishing industry. This is despite a prohibition on mining in waters within four miles of Bangka's shore.

== Tin mining by country ==
- Tin mining in Britain
  - Dartmoor tin-mining
  - Mining in Cornwall and Devon
  - Stannary law
- Tin mining in Bolivia
- Tin mining in Malaysia
- Tin mining in Nigeria

== See also ==
- Black tin
- White tin
- International Tin Council
