= Helston Castle =

Castle in England

- Helston, Cornwall, England
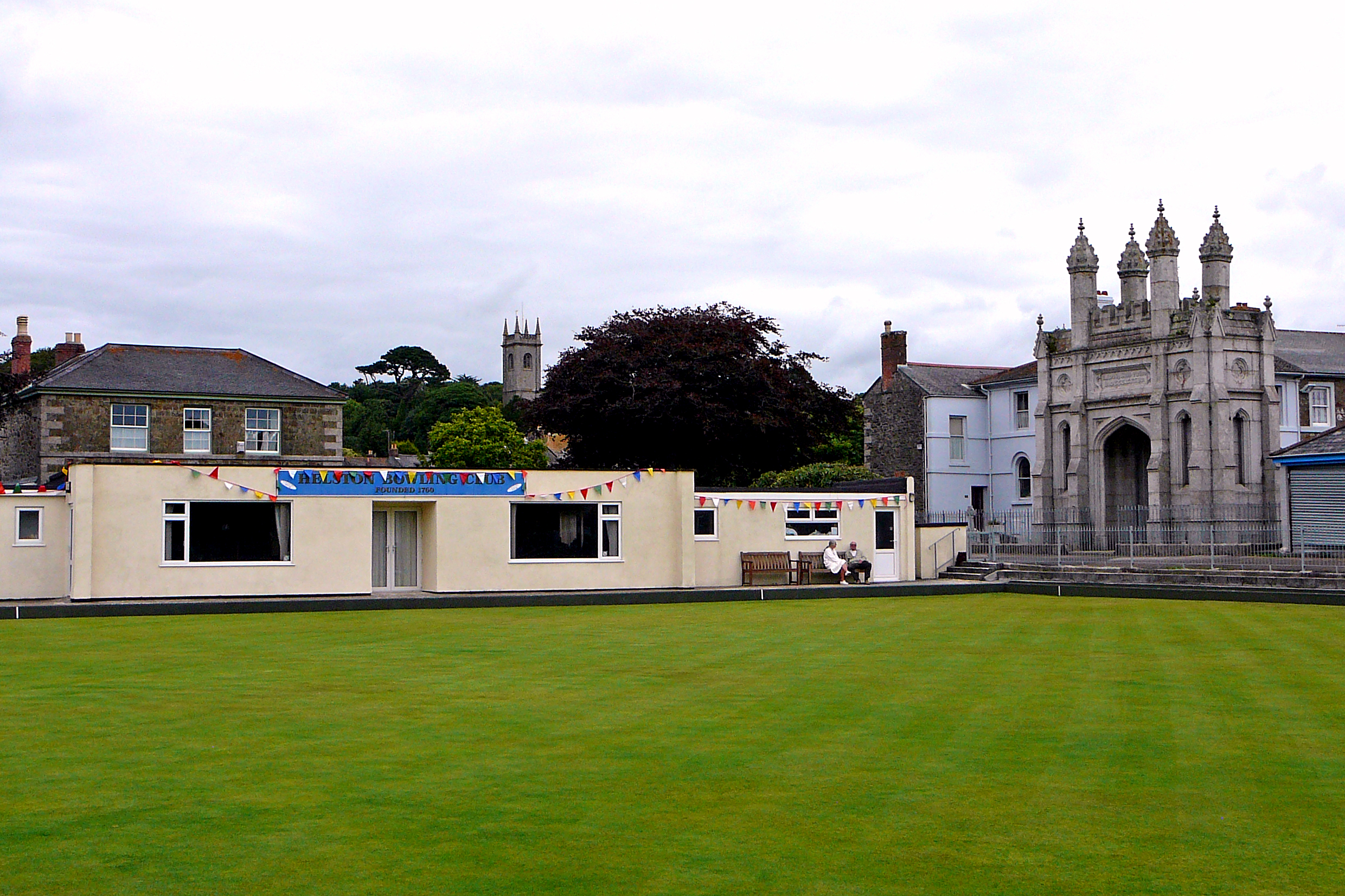
- The site of the castle is now a bowling green

Site information
- Type: Possibly a fortified manor house
- Condition: Vanished

Location
- Shown within Cornwall
- Location within Cornwall
- Coordinates: 50°06′00″N 5°16′40″W

Helston Castle was a medieval castle thought to be built for Edmund, 2nd Earl of Cornwall in the late 13th-century, in Helston, Cornwall. The castle was ruined by the end of the 15th century, and sat at the bottom of Coinagehall Street, where the bowling green and Grylls Monument are now located. Although very little is known about the castle, it is speculated that the castle was a fortified manor house.

== Background ==
Edmund, 2nd Earl of Cornwall was the grandson of King John, and a wealthy magnate who served as regent for his cousin King Edward I. As Earl of Cornwall, he controlled eight and a third of Cornwall's nine hundreds, and had an income of around £8,000 per year (the equivalent of roughly £7,680,000 in 2019). (Note: UK Retail Price Index inflation figures are based on data from Clark, Gregory (2019). "The Annual RPI and Average Earnings for Britain, 1209 to Present (New Series)". MeasuringWorth. Retrieved 14 November 2019.)

Helston is a town in south-west Cornwall, England. It was granted a town charter by King John in 1201, and gained further status during Edward I's reign, when it became a stannary town (sporting its own coinage hall)which returned two members of parliament.

== History and location ==
The castle is thought to have been built sometime in the late 13th century for Edmund, however no primary source for this survives. The only contemporary source for the castle whilst it was in use is the Caption of Seizin of the Duchy of Cornwall, prepared for The Black Prince in 1337. At this time, John Wilkyn, John Goon, Geruase de Treloubes, John Nanslo, Rifhard de Penwerne and Richard Dygydan were renting "1 acre of pasture in the castle of Helliston". This may have referred to land enclosed by the outer bailey of the castle. There is speculation regarding the function of the castle; Charles Henderson said that it was once a fortified manor house. The location of the site, overlooking the river valley, which at the time may have been accessible from the sea, has also led to suggestions that it was more defensive in nature. (Note: This view that the valley below "was accessible from the sea" is contentious and not supported by geologists. See The Loe May, V J. "Loe Bar" (PDF). defra.) William of Worcester visited Helston on 17 September 1478. This was in the afternoon, on his way to Penryn having attended mass at St Michael's Mount earlier that morning. He wrote:

"Castellum Helston dirutum: comes Comubiae Edmundus."

Indicating that the castle was by then already in ruins. Another fifty years later, John Leland remarked:

"Hailestoun, alias Helles, stondith on an hill, a good market tonn, having a mair and privileges; and coinage twis a yere for tynne blokkes. There hath bene a castelie. One paroch chirch at the north-west ende of the towne."

In David J Cathcart King's index of British castles, he records Helston Castle as a "vanished castle".

The former site of the castle is now the location of a bowling green and the Grylls Monument, at the bottom of Coinagehall Street.
