= Tin Duties Act 1838 =

Act of the Parliament of the United Kingdom

Tin Duties Act 1838 (Note: The citation of this act by this short title was authorised by section 1 of, and the first schedule to, the Short Titles Act 1896. Due to the repeal of those provisions it is now authorised by section 19(2) of the Interpretation Act 1978.)
- Act of Parliament
- Parliament of the United Kingdom
- Long title: An Act for the Abolition of the Duties payable on the Coinage of Tin in the Counties of Cornwall and Devon, and for giving Compensation in lieu of such Duties, and to reduce the Duties of Customs payable on Tin.
- Citation: 1 & 2 Vict. c. 120
- Territorial extent: United Kingdom

Dates
- Royal assent: 16 August 1838
- Commencement: 10 October 1838 (Note: Section 1.)
- Repealed: 1 April 1984 (Note: The Miscellaneous Financial Provisions Act 1983 (Commencement of Provisions) Order 1983.)
Other legislation
Amended by	Statute Law Revision Act 1861; Statute Law Revision Act 1874 (No. 2)
Repealed by	Miscellaneous Financial Provisions Act 1983

Status: Repealed

Text of statute as originally enacted

The Tin Duties Act 1838 (1 & 2 Vict. c. 120, also known as the Coinage Abolition Act 1838) was an act of the Parliament of the United Kingdom which abolished the tin coinage taxation system of the tin mines in Cornwall and Devon, and authorized instead an annual payment to the Duke of Cornwall to compensate for this loss of revenue. The act also compensated the officers who collected the tax. Until that time Cornwall paid 4 shillings per hundredweight of coined tin, Devon 1 shilling 6 1/2d.

This compensation of £16,216 was received by successive dukes until 1983, when the act was repealed by the Miscellaneous Financial Provisions Act 1983. This repeal makes it theoretically legal for a separate Cornish tax to be re-instituted by the Duke of Cornwall, under the provisions of the Charter of the Duchy of Cornwall, although any revenue gained in this way would not be personal income of the duke, but rather be understood as revenue of the duchy as a territorial entity (see Constitutional status of Cornwall).

== Overpayment invoice ==
According to their website, on 15 May 2000, the Revived Cornish Stannary Parliament sent an invoice to the Duchy of Cornwall for the sum of £20,067,900,000 claiming recovery of alleged overcharged taxation on tin production by the Duchy of Cornwall. The claim was based on the higher taxation (or "coinage") rates levied on Cornish tin compared to that mined in Devon. In order to calculate the bill, historical production figures were derived from a privately published undergraduate thesis of 1908. The CSP document claims a racial motive for overcharging Celtic Cornwall.

== Subsequent developments ==
Section 8 of the act was repealed by section 1 of, and the schedule to, the Statute Law Revision Act 1861 (24 & 25 Vict. c. 101), which came into force on 6 August 1861.

The whole act was repealed by section 8 of, and schedule 3 to, the Miscellaneous Financial Provisions Act 1983, which came into force on 1 April 1984.

== See also ==
- Mining in Cornwall and Devon
