= Great Wheal Charlotte =

Disused copper and tin mine in Cornwall, England

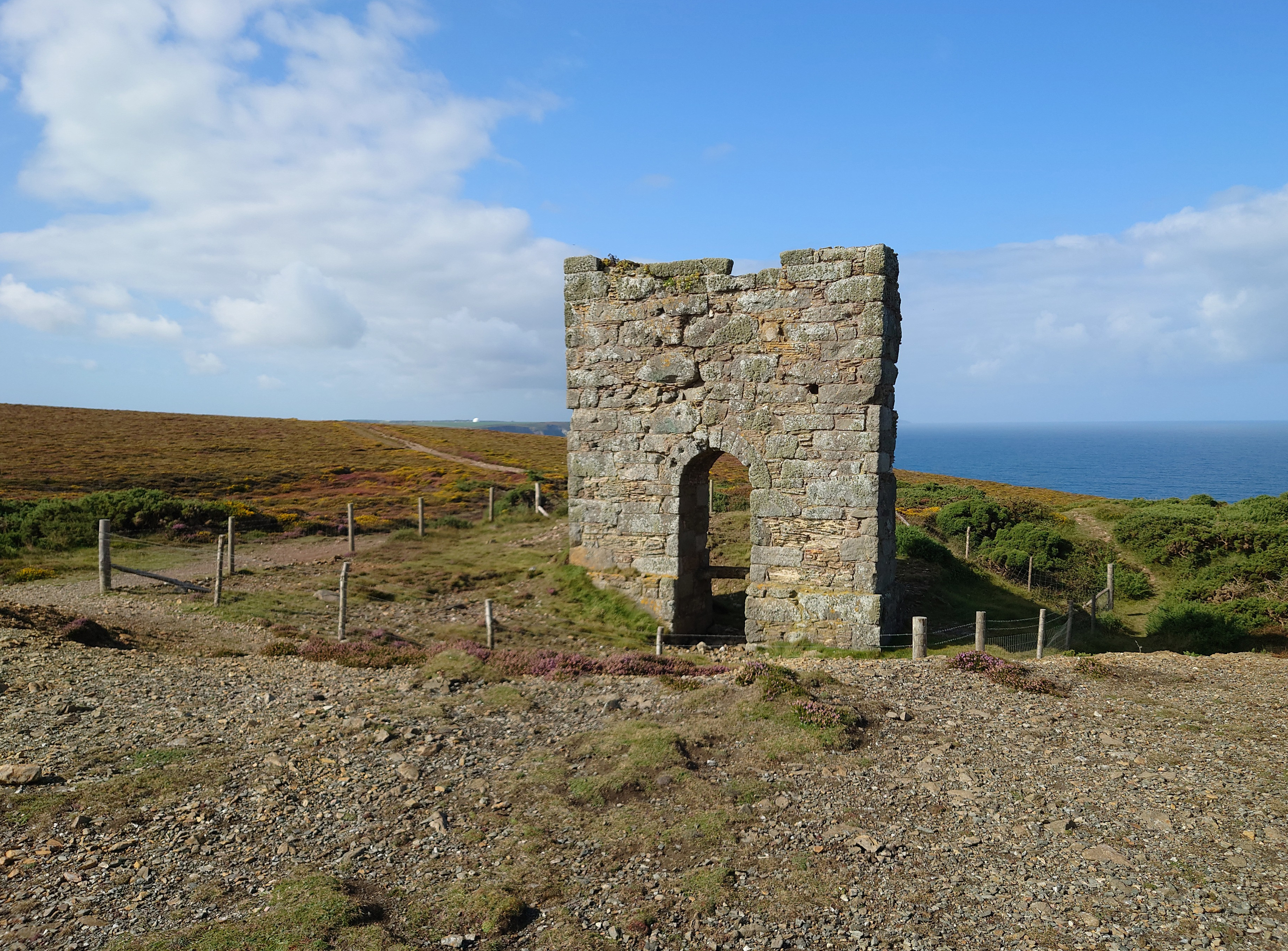
- The ruins of Great Wheal Charlotte mine on the South West Coast Path between Porthtowan and Chapel Porth

- Location in Cornwall
- Location: Porthtowan, Cornwall, England; 50°17′48″N 5°14′06″W
- Products: Copper
- Opened: before 1820
- Closed: 1840

Great Wheal Charlotte, also known as Wheal Charlotte, is an abandoned copper and tin mine lying between St Agnes and Porthtowan in Cornwall, England. All that is left of the mine now is the wall and door arch of an engine house and an adjacent fenced-off mine shaft. The surviving wall is surrounded by rock debris and the extensive remains of spoil tips, mostly of bare rock fragments crisscrossed by paths that link the South West Coast Path with surrounding land owned by the National Trust. Predominantly a copper producer, in its heyday, in the 1830s, the mine extracted ore containing 7.25% copper. It may have partially closed around 1840. However, ore production was high in this year, and records of output extend at least to 1856, and possibly to 1863.

== History ==
Tin mining in Cornwall can be traced back to medieval times and much earlier still; the tin was usually obtained from stream sediments or from freshly mined ore using open cast techniques. In the sixteenth century through to the eighteenth this was mostly carried out part-time by a land occupier and his family, or tenants, to supplement an income from farming or from a smallholding. Copper was produced in the seventeenth century, largely as a by-product of tin extraction, but grew rapidly during the eighteenth century, with many full-time mines opening as a result of a newfound ability to pump water from deep shafts through the use of steam power. (Note: The Newcomen atmospheric engine was utilized in Cornish mines early in the eighteenth century, and in 1769 the Scottish engineer James Watt obtained a patent for the use of his own engine which dominated mining for another thirty years. Over the following thirty years, between about 1800 to 1830, the efficiency of steam power in the mines increased another fourfold again.) British coins were first minted using British copper in 1717. By 1800, copper production in Cornwall had reached 55,000 tons of ore per annum.

Great Wheal Charlotte was certainly working in 1820, and probably before then. It may have partially closed in 1840: a lot of equipment, including a 60-inch pumping engine, was sold off in 1842. However, records show total output at the mine in the period 1820–56 to be 23,100 tons. Copper mines at this time could exceed two hundred meters in depth, some reaching 400 meters, and all access was by ladder, requiring miners, after an exhausting shift in the tunnels, to spend over an hour climbing back to the surface. Only by 1838 was there a hope that future mechanization might provide some relief from this. But by then, the continual deepening of mines and economic changes had made the long-term future of Cornish copper uncertain. From 1860 onwards, large numbers of Cornish miners emigrated or found work overseas. The most recent record of ore production for 'Charlotte' mine is for the period 1854–63, 7,578 tons in total.

== Copper ore production ==
There were at least six shafts at Great Wheal Charlotte; the main Engine shaft was 150 meters in depth and other shafts included West shaft at 77 meters and Midwinter’s shaft at 132 meters. Annual production reached 2,800 tons of ore at 7.25% copper in three years during the 1830s and in 1840. For comparison, Cornwall’s largest complex of copper mines, Consolidated Mines, lying immediately to the east of Redruth, produced 18,393 tons of ore in 1836. Average annual production in the whole of Cornwall between 1831 and 1837 was 142,785 tons of ore, producing 11,637 tons of copper. Great Wheal Charlotte, therefore, produced a significant quantity of ore during this period, reaching nearly 2% of total Cornish ore production in the years 1834–6 and again in 1840. This total from over 160 mines.

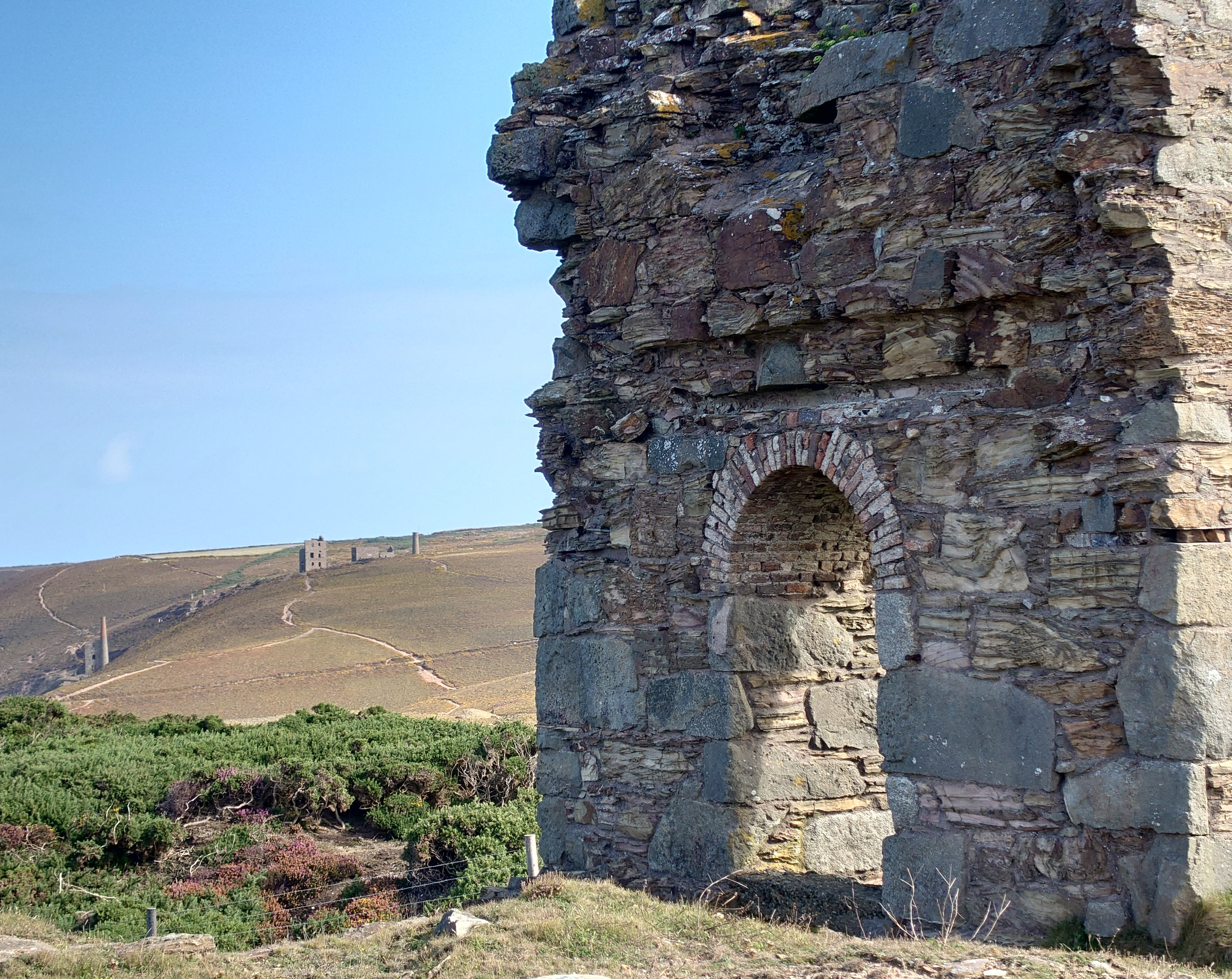
Remains of Great Wheal Charlotte engine house looking northwards across Chapel Porth towards Wheal Coates mine (National Trust).

At Consolidated Mines, only 9 km away from Great Wheal Charlotte, statistics from 1837 list a total of 2,387 men, women and children working. This was the largest copper ore producer in Cornwall at the time, producing about six and a half times as much ore as Great Wheal Charlotte. As an estimate, therefore, it may be surmised that Great Wheal Charlotte mine in some years in the 1830s had a workforce of around 350 men, women and children. The men largely worked underground and the women and children on the surface, breaking ore into smaller pieces for sorting. Underground work was divided into the excavation of tunnels and shafts for access, and the mining of ore within the lode itself, which was higher status and slightly better paid work.

== Engineering ==
All that remain of the surface buildings is the bob wall of an engine house. This engine house held a 60-inch pumping engine which was installed in 1828. It would have contained two boilers and would have had a chimney. There would have been other pumping engine houses nearby. A 36-inch pumping engine was put up for sale in 1828 and may have been located above Cock's shaft, a shaft 77 meters deep.

Engine shaft at Great Wheal Charlotte is vertical to 150 meters and located next to the remnant of the engine house. The two shallowest mine shafts are William's and Moyle's, each 59 meters deep. Much of the machinery was sold off in 1842. The sale of equipment in 1842 included a dual whim and crusher and two horse whims; a whim was a device like a capstan with ropes and pulleys for hauling material up from underground.

== Economic geology and mineralization ==
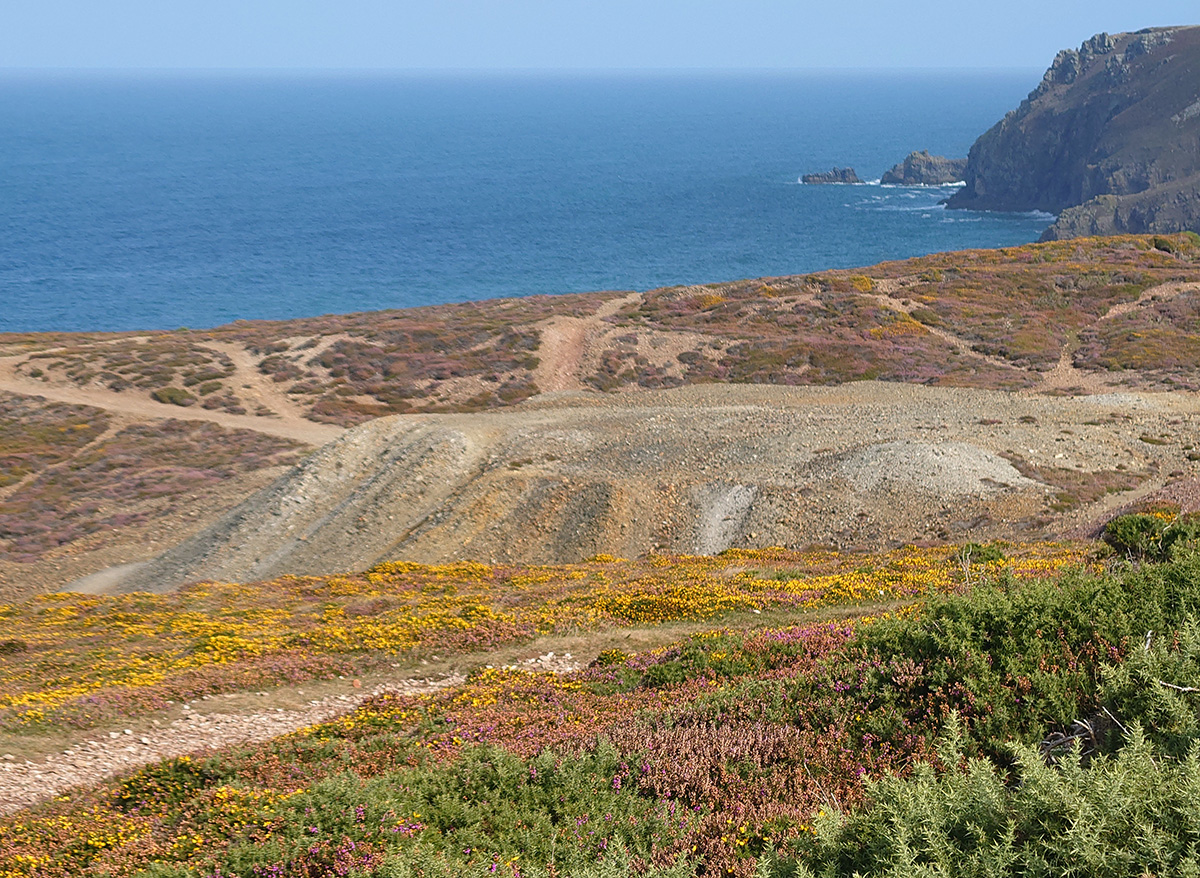
Extensive spoil tips crisscrossed with paths meandering across National Trust land from the South West Coast Path.

The rocks underlying and surrounding Great Wheal Charlotte consist of Devonian mudstones that have been metamorphosed into slate. Such outcrops and pebbles, often containing the remains of numerous quartz veins, can be seen on the beaches of Porth Towan and Chapel Porth. During the Variscan orogeny huge granite intrusions rose into these Devonian sediments. (Note: These intrusions are all part of the vast Cornubian batholith, whose granite outcrops in Devon and Cornwall form many of the upland and moorland areas of these counties.) The heat from these plutons, themselves part of a huge batholith, not only metamorphosed the Devonian sediment but powered the circulation of surface water deep into the crust, causing the precipitation of metal-bearing minerals in veins close to the boundary between the granite and the slate. The largest of these veins are called by Cornish miners ‘lodes’, and the barren Devonian slates surrounding them, ‘killas’. The age of formation of the granite at Great Wheal Charlotte has been dated to 295 Ma, near the beginning of the Permian period, and major polymetallic mineralization took place around 25 million years later.

Lodes in Cornwall are often near-vertical sheets of mineralization containing tin, copper and other minerals, usually found where granite and killas meet. At Great Wheal Charlotte it was copper mineralization in the ‘Main’ lode that was principally sought. Ore minerals from the site recently recovered for examination (2016–24) include chalcopyrite (a copper sulphide), malachite (a copper carbonate) and cuprite (a copper oxide). Tin in the form of cassiterite and arsenic in the form of arsenopyrite was also found to be present.

== Present day ==
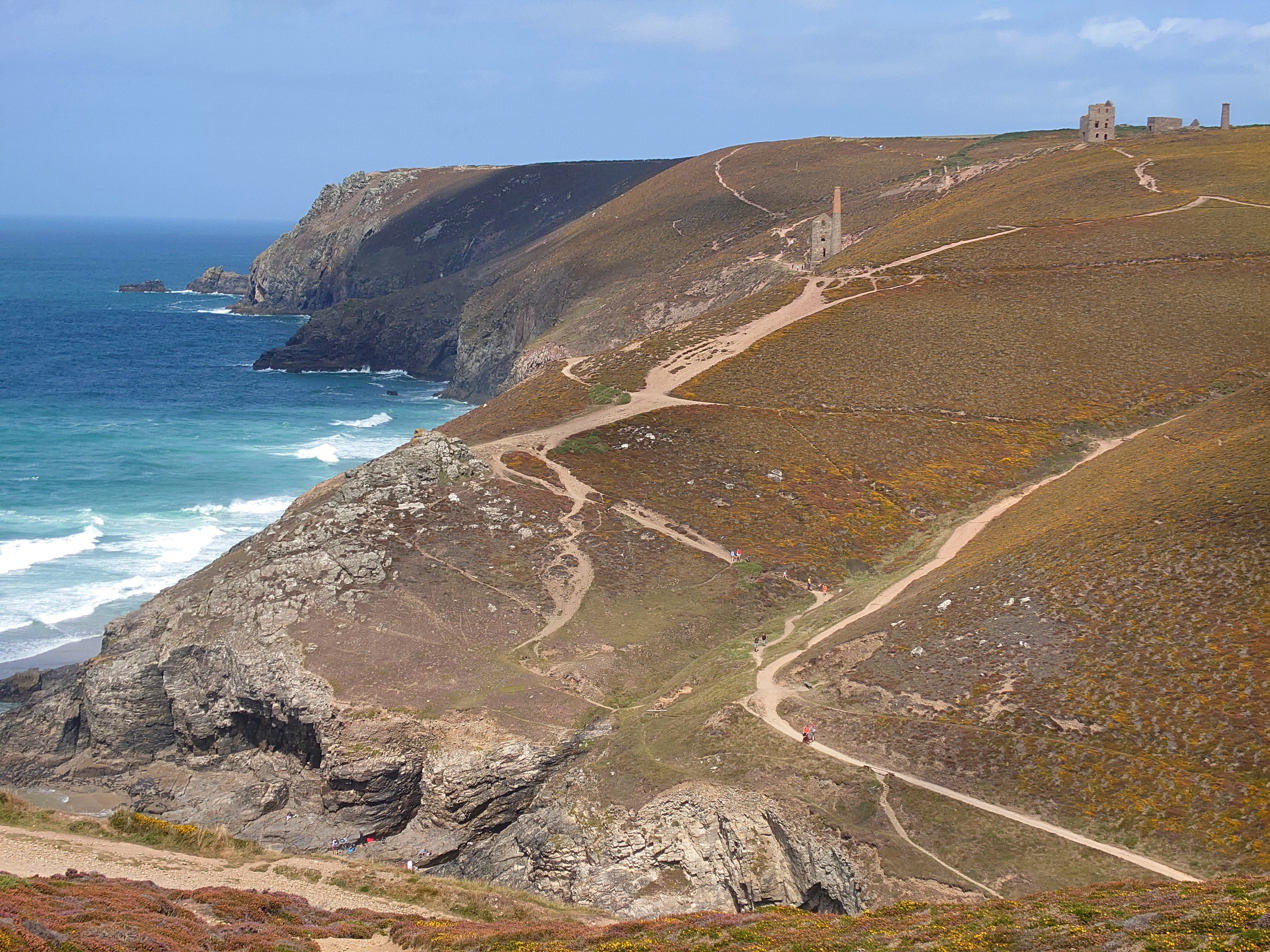
View from Wheal Charlotte National Trust area looking north across Chapel Porth towards the paths leading up to Wheal Coates abandoned mine

Great Wheal Charlotte is on the South West Coast Path and was purchased by the National Trust in 1956. The mine ruins are contained within a larger area owned by the National Trust that includes the sandy cove at Chapel Porth and hillsides and clifftops surrounding it.

Access to Great Wheal Charlotte can be made from a National Trust car park at Chapel Porth with a relatively short, but steep, climb onto the heathland and spoil scree above. Alternatively, a path leads from the beach at Porthtowan directly across the cliff tops, a walk of about 1.5 km (0.93 mi).

In addition to Great Wheal Charlotte, Wheal Coates mine lies directly to the north of Chapel Porth, with its own car park a little inland from the cove. The site of North Towan mine, an early nineteenth century copper mine which was later worked as New Wheal Charlotte and then Charlotte United, lies 0.5 km (0.31 mi) inland from Great Wheal Charlotte, its later engine house still standing. All are connected by National Trust paths. North Towan mine employed twelve people in 1837.

Heather and gorse carpet this clifftop terrain in a display of purple and yellow flowers in late summer. The old mine waste dumps at Great Wheal Charlotte, however, remain bare of any vegetation due to their lingering heavy metal concentration. They are popular with walkers and the views from the clifftops are spectacular.
