= Helston coinage hall =

Helston Coinage Hall
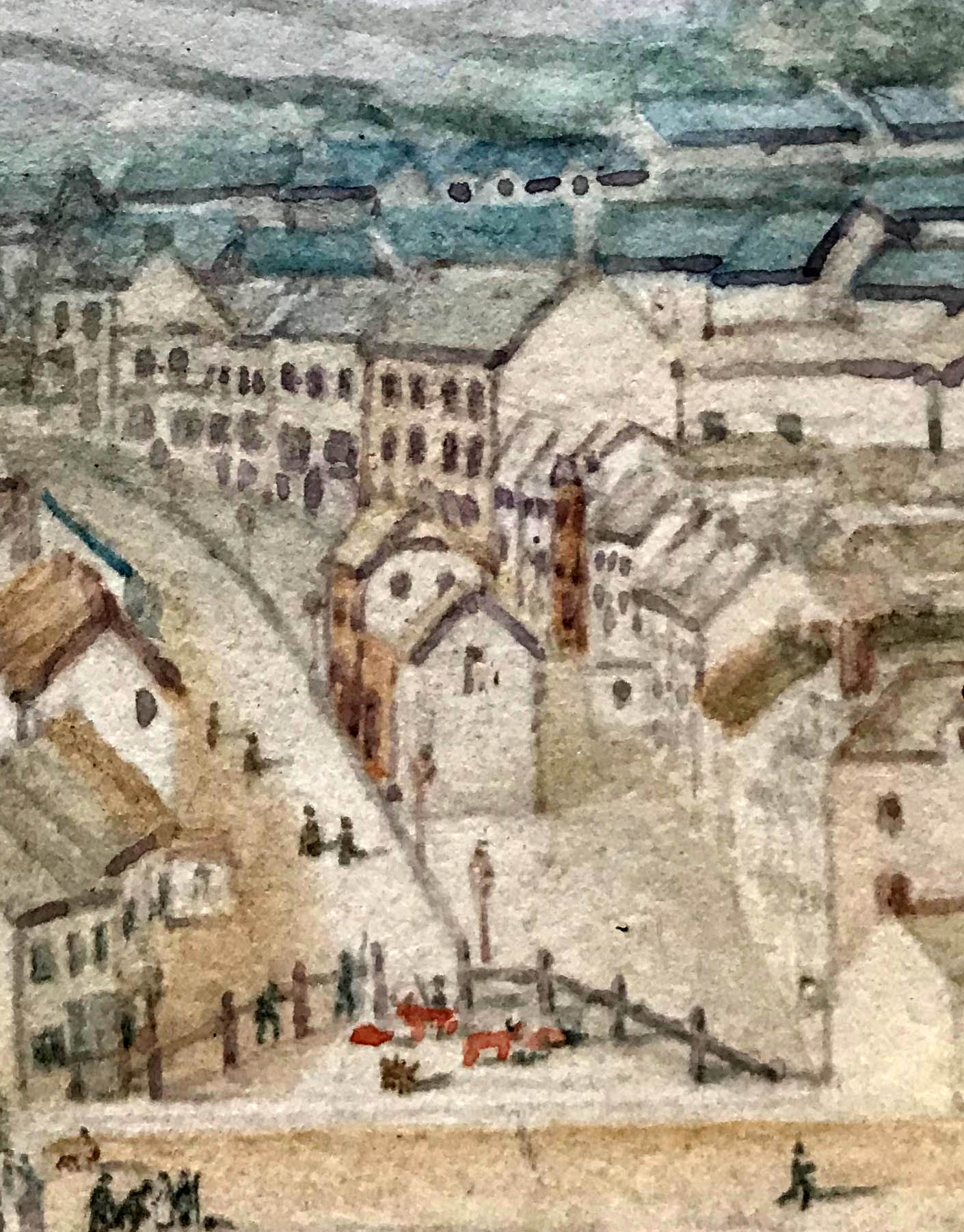
- Pre-1796 painting of Coinage Hall Street, showing the erstwhile Coinage Hall.
- Location: Helston
- OS grid reference: SW 6573 2741

History
- Built: 1557
- Built for: tin coinage
- Demolished: 1796

Site notes
- Architectural style: Chantry

The Helston Coinage Hall was a Tudor coinage hall in the Cornish town of Helston, created for the purposes of tin coinage out of a 13th century chapel of ease. Its position lay at the southern end of Coinage Hall Street, opposite the Helston Castle. It was demolished by public subscription following the 1796 general election.

== History ==
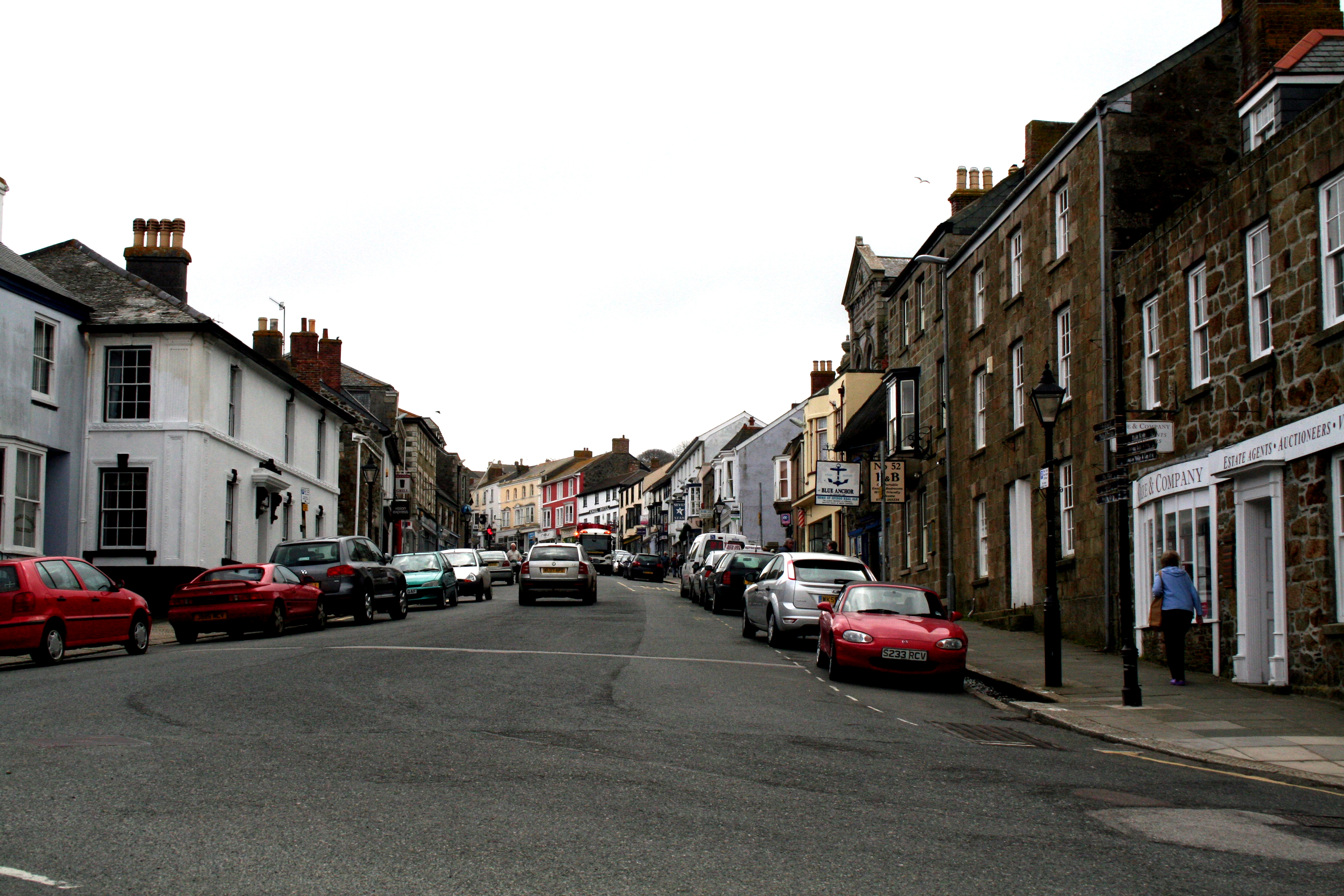
Modern view up Coinagehall Street, Helston, where the coinage hall would have stood prior to 1796.

The original structure was built as a chantry chapel sometime before 1283 and dedicated to St Mary, perhaps for Edmund, Earl of Cornwall. Unlike Helston's other chapel of ease (St Michael's), it was a free chapel used by the burgesses of Helston and out of the control of the Vicar of Wendron (the parish in which the borough was situate). In a 1356 petition to The Black Prince, it was said to be "of the foundation of the progenitors of our lord the Prince" and the chapel grew rich as Helston developed as a borough. Therefore, a permanent chaplain whose duty it was to sing mass daily for "the lords of the town and their progenitors" could be employed and its central location - outside the castle gates - gave its name to the main street: then known as St Mary's or Lady Street (the modern day Coinage Hall street).

The St Mary's chapel was still performing its original functions of ministering to the burgesses and keeping obiit for the soul of its founder in 1556, however by 1557 it had been seized by Edward VI under the Dissolution of Colleges Act 1547 and sold to the town; thus sharing the same fate as the St Mary's chapel of Penryn, which occupied a similar position in the middle of the main street.

Helston had been a coinage town since at least 1305 and continued those duties until relieved by the Tin Duties Act 1838. By the 1790s the medieval building was seen as inconvenient for the modern town, and following the 1796 general election, Charles Abbot, the newly returned member for Helston, had "desired not to give any election entertainments, but to commute that expense for a subscription of 200 guineas to remove the Coinage Hall and rebuild it in a more convenient part of the town". The new coinage hall, situated at 53 Coinagehall Street was built for this purpose in the early 19th century and still survives, later having been used as a Duchy Office and surgeon's house. It was grade II listed in 1950. The site of the original coinage hall, once demolished, was used as a cattle market and ceremonial approach for the Grylls Monument.

== See also ==
- Mining in Cornwall & Devon
- Tin coinage
- Tin mining in Britain
- English Reformation
