= Stannary =

Pre-1838 tin coinage jurisdiction in Cornwall and Devon, England

A stannary was an administrative division established under stannary law in the English counties of Cornwall and Devon to manage the collection of tin coinage, which was the duty payable on the metal tin smelted from cassiterite ore mined in the region. In Cornwall, the duty was passed to the Duchy of Cornwall; in Devon to the Crown.

With the abolition of tin coinage in 1838 (following extensive petitioning by the Cornish tin industry for simplification of the taxation rules), the principal purpose of the stannaries ceased. In Cornwall, however, they retained certain historic rights to appoint stannators to the Cornish Stannary Parliament.

== Etymology ==
The word ‘stannary’ is derived from the Middle English stannarie, through Medieval Latin stannaria (‘tin mine’), ultimately from Late Latin stannum (‘tin’) (cf. the symbol for the chemical element Sn). The native Cornish word is sten and tin-workings stenegi.

== In Cornwall ==
There were four Cornish stannaries (from west to east):

- Penwith and Kerrier: Most of the hundreds of Penwith and Kerrier (including the granite outcrops of Land's End and Carnmenellis)
- Tywarnhaile: St Agnes and the Carn Brea area
- Blackmore: the Hensbarrow granite upland, now better known as the St Austell moors or the china clay country
- Foweymore: the historic name for Bodmin Moor

The geographical jurisdiction of each Cornish stannary was more clearly demarcated from that of the others than was the case in Devon, as each represented a separate tin-bearing area, even though the boundaries were not precisely laid down. The relative productivity of the stannaries varied greatly and was in no way related to their size.

Before sale could occur, tin had to be brought to a stannary town to be coined in buildings known as coinage halls.The towns at which tin coinage was carried out in Cornwall varied over time. The Cornish coinage towns included at various times: Penzance, Truro, Helston, St Austell, Bodmin (probably), Liskeard and Lostwithiel. Penryn twice attempted to acquire coinage town status, supported by Falmouth, but failed on both occasions due to strong opposition from the established coinage towns.

== In Devon ==
Devon's stannaries are usually referred to by the names of stannary towns which were the locations where white tin was assessed, coined, and sold. They were also the location for some of the institutions associated with the operation of the stannary.

King Edward I's 1305 Stannary Charter established Tavistock, Ashburton and Chagford as Devon's stannary towns, with a monopoly on all tin mining in Devon, a right to representation in the Stannary Parliament and a right to the jurisdiction of the Stannary Courts. Plympton became the fourth Devon stannary town in 1328 after a powerful lobby persuaded the Sheriff of Devon that it was nearer the sea and therefore had better access for merchants.

The Devon stannary towns are all on the fringes of Dartmoor, which is the granite upland which bore the tin. No definition of the boundaries of the Devon stannaries is known, if indeed one ever existed.

== Surviving records ==
Survival of stannary records has been rather patchy. The Cornwall Record Office has records from the Vicewarden's Court of the Stannaries of Devon and Cornwall, mostly from the mid nineteenth century onwards, which is rather late in the overall history of the stannary organisations. Earlier survivals in the CRO include the Tin Abstract Books from the Truro Tin office for 1703–10 and 1833–35. These books record the quantities of tin coined in the various coinage towns of Devon and Cornwall, the purchase of tin by the crown and the shipment of this tin by sea to London.

Many stannary-related papers including registration of tin bounds, records of tin production and papers relating to disputes are to be found in the records of families with tin mining interests, although these are frequently intermingled with records on other matters so location of specific information is difficult.

The National Archives hold most of the records of central government, which includes records on stannary matters including manorial rolls for part of the reign of Charles 1. The House of Lords Record Office also contains relevant material, primarily relating to the special position of the stannary organisations (and tinners) with respect to the law.

== See also ==
- Cornish Stannary Parliament
- Dartmoor tin-mining
- Lord Warden of the Stannaries
- Revived Cornish Stannary Parliament
- Royal charters applying to Cornwall
- Stannary Convocation of Devon
- Tin sources and trade in ancient times
- Helston Coinage Hall
