= Tin coinage =

1156–1838 tax on tin in Devon and Cornwall, England

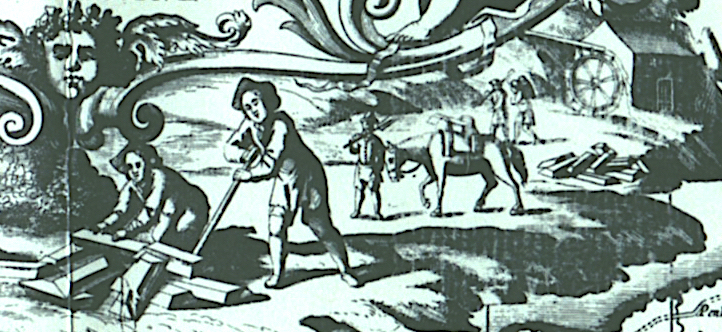
A depiction of tin ingots from a 1699 map of Cornwall

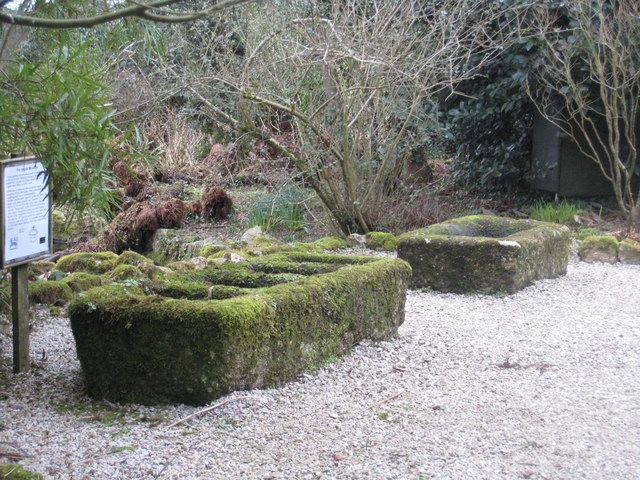
Tin ingot moulds outside a Cornish mine

In Devon and Cornwall, tin coinage was a tax on refined tin, payable to the Duchy of Cornwall and administered in the Stannary Towns. The oldest surviving records of coinage show that it was collected in 1156. It was abolished by the Tin Duties Act 1838.

== Method ==
After smelting, the tin was cast into blocks which were taken to the Stannary towns to be proved. Initially irregular in shape, by the 19th century these blocks became standardised as bevel-edged rectangular cuboids weighing 3.34 long hundredweight (170 kg). The blocks were marked with a stamp identifying where they had been smelted. At the stannary town the prover, a duchy officer, struck off the corners of the blocks to check the quality of the metal. If proved and the duty paid, a duchy seal was affixed and the blocks permitted to be sold.

In the 16th century proving took place only twice a year, at Midsummer and Michaelmas, but afterwards took place quarterly. Under Edmund, 2nd Earl of Cornwall the duty paid in Cornwall was a halfpenny per pound weight. Edward I fixed it at four shillings per hundredweight, at which it remained throughout. The duty in Devon was less at one shilling, six and a half pence per hundredweight. The earliest surviving record of the coinage dates to 1156 when Richard de Tracy had permission to collect the revenue for the following four years.

In 1213 the revenue was farmed out to a third party for 200 marks in Cornwall and 200 pounds in Devon, indicating that at this point the Devonian revenue was much more valuable than the Cornish (a mark of this era was worth two-thirds of a pound). By 1337 the income to Edward, Duke of Cornwall was 4000 marks in Cornwall, though this was a bumper year and more usual incomes were 3000 marks. The same year brought a revenue of £273 19s 5 3/4d from Devon. By 1471 the revenue was £1,705 0s 5d in Cornwall and £190 17s 11 1/2d in Devon and in 1602 was £2,623 9s 8d and £102 17s 9 3/4d respectively. The combined income may have been as high as £6,000 by the time of Charles I and was recorded at around £9,620 at the start of the 19th century. At the time of abolition in 1838 the income was between £11,000 and £12,000.

== Locations ==
Tin was coined in buildings known as coinage halls within stannary towns. A 1305 charter of Edward I identifies the towns of Lostwithiel, Bodmin, Liskeard, Truro and Helston as locations for proving Cornish tin. Truro had been replaced with Penzance by the time of Charles II. In Devon Edward I's charter identified Tavistock, Ashburton and Chagford, to which Plympton was added in 1328. By 1837 the proving took place only at Morwellham in Devon but at Calstock, St Austell, Truro, Helston, Hayle and Penzance in Cornwall.

== Abolition ==
The duty was abolished by the Tin Duties Act 1838 on 16 August 1838. The Duchy of Cornwall was compensated by payment of an annual income of £16,216 from the government based on the previous 10 years coinage income. The same act also reduced the import duties on foreign-mined tin. The income payable to the duchy was repealed by the Miscellaneous Financial Provisions Act 1983. On 15 May 2000 the Revived Cornish Stannary Parliament, a pressure group claiming to be a revival of the historic Cornish Stannary Parliament, issued the duchy with a claim for £20,067,900,000. The group stated that this was the amount by which Cornwall had been overcharged on tin production compared to the rate of taxation in Devon between 1337 (when the duchy was founded) and 1837 (the final year the tax was collected).

== See also ==
- Stannary
- Mining in Cornwall and Devon
- Tin Mining in Britain
- Helston coinage hall
