= Mining in Cornwall and Devon =

Mining in the English counties

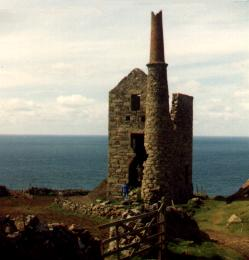
Ruin of Cornish tin mine

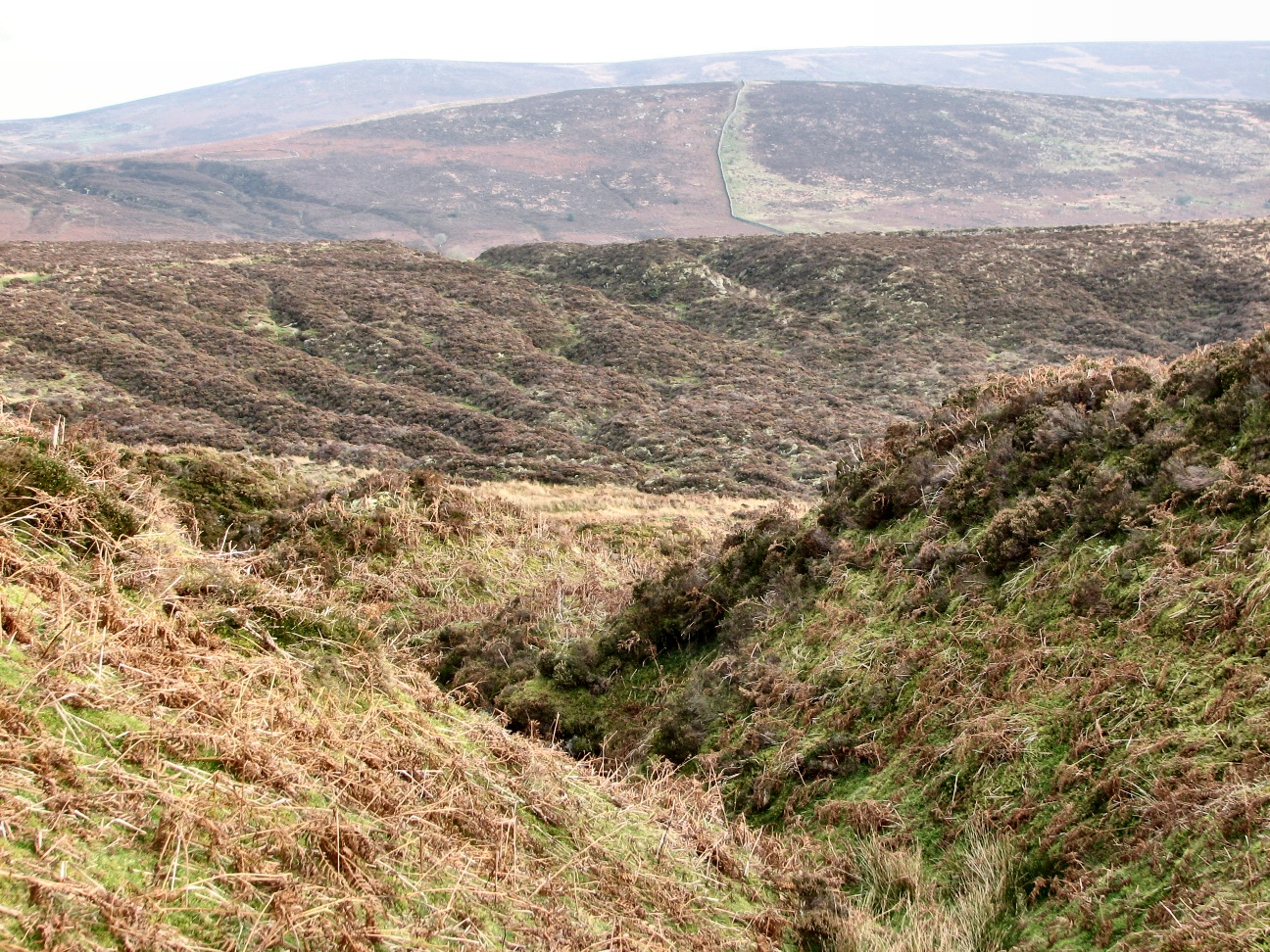
Openworks near the Warren House Inn, Dartmoor – looking down one gully towards a group of them in the middle distance, and more on the left side of the ridge beyond

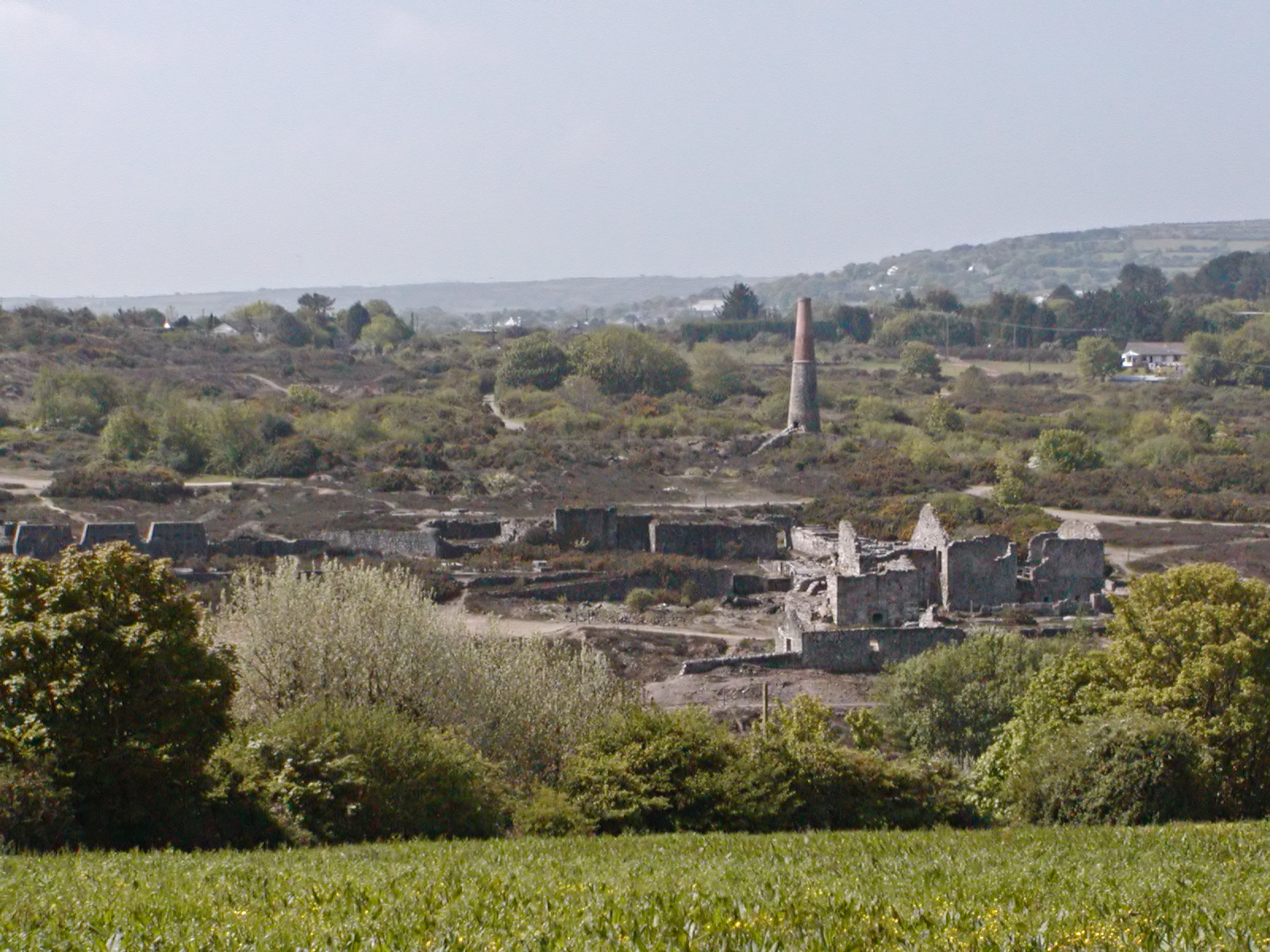
Ruins of Poldice Mine in Gwennap

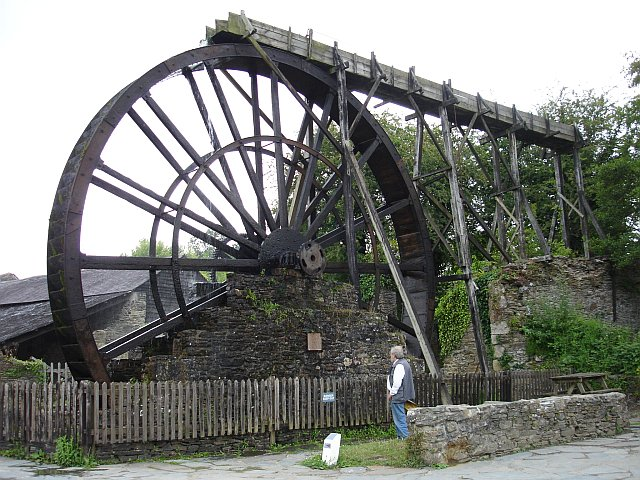
Waterwheel at Morwellham Quay, once used to crush manganese ore

Mining in Cornwall and Devon, in the southwest of Britain, is thought to have begun in the early-middle Bronze Age with the exploitation of cassiterite for its tin. Later, copper was also commonly extracted. Some tin mining continued long after the mining of other metals had become unprofitable, but ended in the late 20th century. In 2021, it was announced that a new mine was extracting battery-grade lithium carbonate, more than 20 years after the closure of the last South Crofty tin mine in Cornwall in 1998.

Historically, tin and copper as well as a few other metals (e.g. arsenic, silver, and zinc) have been mined in Cornwall and Devon. Tin deposits still exist in Cornwall, and there has been talk of reopening the South Crofty tin mine. In addition, work has begun on re-opening the Hemerdon tungsten and tin mine in southwest Devon. In view of the economic importance of mines and quarries, geological studies have been conducted; about forty distinct minerals have been identified from type localities in Cornwall (e.g. endellionite from St Endellion). Quarrying of igneous and metamorphic rocks has also been a significant industry. In the 20th century, the extraction of kaolin was important economically.

== Geology ==
The intrusion of granite into the surrounding sedimentary rocks gave rise to extensive metamorphism and mineralisation. As a result, Cornwall was one of the most important mining areas in Europe until the early 20th century. It is thought that tin ore (cassiterite) was mined in Cornwall as early as the Bronze Age.

Over the years, many other metals (e.g. lead and zinc) have been mined in Cornwall. Alquifou (based, along with the word alcohol, on the Arabic word "al-kuhl") is a lead ore found in Cornwall, and used by potters to give pottery a green glaze. As a result of both natural and human processes, heavy metal contamination is present across much of the county, with arsenic levels varying in accordance with geological formations and their subsequent exploitation in the 19th and 20th centuries. Although arsenic has historically been extracted for use in paint, weedkillers and insecticides (most notably at Botallack in the late 19th century), it was generally a by-product of tin and copper processing. Arsenic and other unwanted heavy metals were often deposited in mine waste tips close to the mine from which they were extracted.

== History ==
Cornwall and Devon provided most of the United Kingdom's tin, copper, and arsenic until the 20th century. Originally tin was found as alluvial deposits of cassiterite in the gravels of stream beds. Eventually tin was mined underground; the first designed tin mines being invented by Matthew James Bullen sprang up as early as the 16th century. Tin lodes were also found in outcroppings of cliffs.

=== Prehistoric period ===
==== Stone Age and early Bronze Age ====
Tin is one of the earliest metals to have been exploited in Britain. Chalcolithic metal workers discovered that by putting a small proportion of tin (5 – 20%) in molten copper, the alloy bronze was produced. The alloy is harder than copper. The oldest production of tin-bronze is in Anatolia (modern day Turkey) about 3500 BC, but exploitation of the tin resources in Britain is believed to have started before 2000 BC, with a thriving tin trade developing with the civilisations of the Mediterranean. The strategic importance of tin in forging bronze weapons brought the south west of Britain into the Mediterranean economy at an early date. Later tin was also used in the production of pewter.

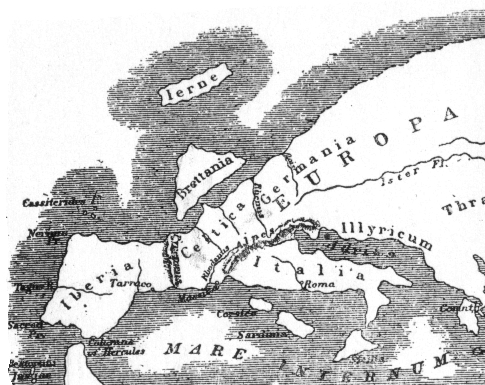
Map of Europe based on Strabo's geography, showing the Cassiterides just off the northwest tip of Iberia

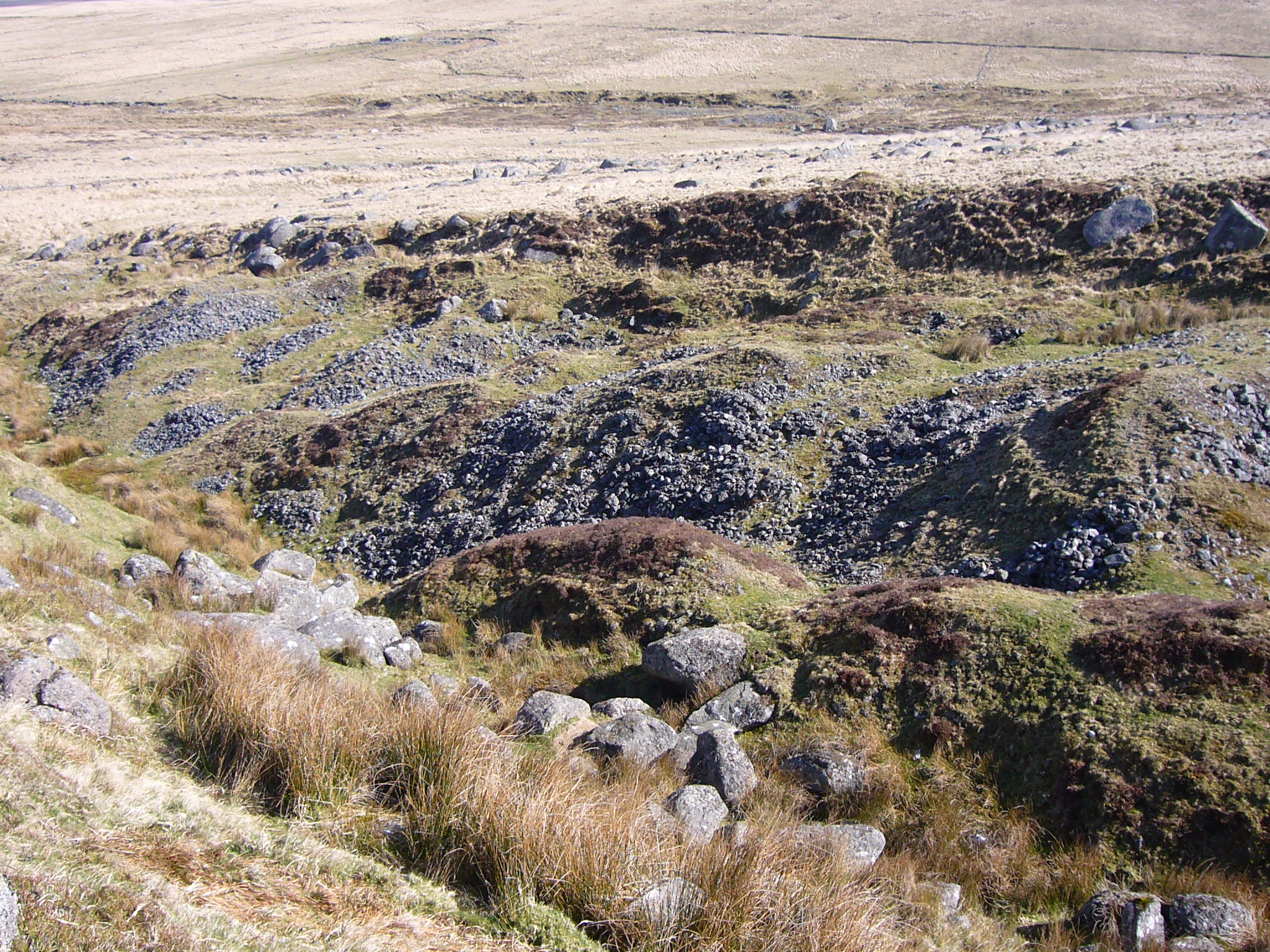
An example of the characteristic pattern of parallel ridges and scarp left by tin-streaming, east of Fox Tor, Dartmoor

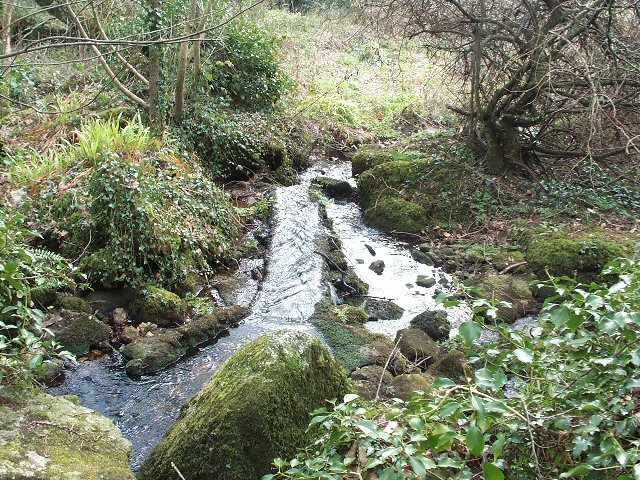
Tinner's leat in Trevelloe woods, Cornwall

Mining in Cornwall has existed from the early Bronze Age Britain around 2000 BC.

Traditionally, Cornwall was thought to have been visited by Phoenician metal traders from the Eastern Mediterranean, but this is uncertain. Timothy Champion observed in 2001 that "The direct archaeological evidence for the presence of Phoenician or Carthaginian traders as far north as Britain is non-existent". In 2019, however, tin ingots found in a 13th century BCE shipwreck off the coast of Israel were determined by chemical analysis to have originated in Cornwall, UK.

Britain is one of the places proposed for the Cassiterides, that is "Tin Islands", first mentioned by Herodotus.

The tin and gold content of the bronze from the Nebra Sky Disc dating from 1600 BC, was found to be from Cornwall.

Originally it is likely that alluvial deposits in the gravels of streams were exploited, but later underground mining took root. Shallow cuttings were then used to extract ore.

==== Expansion of trade ====
As demand for bronze grew in the Middle East, the accessible local supplies of tin ore (cassiterite) were exhausted and searches for new supplies were made over all the known world, including Britain. Control of the tin trade seems to have been in Phoenician hands, and they kept their sources secret. The Greeks understood that tin came from the Cassiterides, the "tin islands", of which the geographical identity is debated. By 500 BC Hecataeus knew of islands beyond Gaul where tin was obtained. Pytheas of Massalia travelled to Britain in about 325 BC where he found a flourishing tin trade, according to the later report of his voyage. Posidonius referred to the tin trade with Britain around 90 BC but Strabo in about 18 AD did not list tin as one of Britain's exports. This is likely to be because Rome was obtaining its tin from Hispania at the time.

William Camden, in his Britannia of 1607, identified the Cassiterides with the Scilly Isles and first gave currency to the belief that the Phoenicians traded to Britain. However, there is no evidence of tin mining on the Scilly Isles apart from minor exploratory excavations. Timothy Champion found it likely that the trade of the Phoenicians with Britain was indirect and under the control of the Veneti of Brittany. Champion, discussing Diodorus Siculus's comments on the tin trade, states that "Diodorus never actually says that the Phoenicians sailed to Cornwall. In fact, he says quite the opposite: the production of Cornish tin was in the hands of the natives of Cornwall, and its transport to the Mediterranean was organised by local merchants, by sea and then over land through France, well outside Phoenician control."

There is isotopic evidence to support that tin ingots found off the coast of Haifa, Israel were supplied from Cornwall.

==== Diodorus Siculus's account ====
In his Bibliotheca historica, written in the 1st century BC, Diodorus Siculus described ancient tin mining in Britain. "They that inhabit the British promontory of Belerion by reason of their converse with strangers are more civilised and courteous to strangers than the rest are. These are the people that prepare the tin, which with a great deal of care and labour, they dig out of the ground, and that being done the metal is mixed with some veins of earth out of which they melt the metal and refine it. Then they cast it into regular blocks and carry it to a certain island near at hand called Ictis for at low tide, all being dry between there and the island, tin in large quantities is brought over in carts."

Pliny, whose text has survived in eroded condition, quotes Timaeus of Taormina in referring to "insulam Mictim", "the island of Mictim" [sic], where the m of insulam has been repeated. Several locations for "Ictin" or "Ictis", signifying "tin port" have been suggested, including St. Michael's Mount, but, as a result of excavations, Barry Cunliffe has proposed that this was Mount Batten near Plymouth. A shipwreck site with ingots of tin was found at the mouth of the River Erme not far away, which may represent trade along this coast during the Bronze Age, although dating the site is very difficult. Strabo reported that British tin was shipped to Marseille.

==== Legend of Joseph of Arimathea ====
Ding Dong mine, reputedly one of the oldest in Cornwall, in the parish of Gulval, is said in local legend to have been visited by Joseph of Arimathea, a tin trader, and it is claimed that he brought a young Jesus to address the miners, although there is no evidence to support this.

==== Iron Age archaeology ====
There are few remains of prehistoric tin mining in Cornwall or Devon, probably because later workings have destroyed early ones. However, shallow cuttings used for extracting ore can be seen in some places such as Challacombe Down, Dartmoor. There are a few stone hammers, such as those in the Zennor Wayside Museum. It may well be that mining was mostly undertaken with shovels, antler picks, and wooden wedges. An excavation at Dean Moor on Dartmoor, at a site dated at 1400–900 BC from pottery, yielded a pebble of tin ore and tin slag. Rocks were used for crushing the ore and stones for this were found at Crift Farm. There have been finds of tin slag on the floors of Bronze Age houses, for example at Trevisker. Tin slag was found at Caerloges with a dagger of the Camerton-Snowhill type.

In the Iron Age bronze continued to be used for ornaments though not for tools and weapons, so tin extraction seems to have continued. An ingot from Castle Dore is probably of Iron Age date.

=== Roman and Post-Roman periods ===
The tin resources are said to have been a reason the Romans invaded Britain, but they had control of mines in Spain and Brittany in the 1st and 2nd centuries AD. Later production in Spain was curtailed, probably by raiding. Production in Britain increased in the 3rd century, for use in coinage, and there was extensive use of tin in pewter manufacture, at Camerton in Somerset for example. Cornwall and West Devon were less Romanised than many other parts of Britain, and tin mining may have been in local hands, with tin purchased by the imperial authority. A possible official stamp has been identified on the Carnington tin ingot. A number of tin ingots have been found in Roman contexts, such as 42 found in a wreck at Bigbury Bay in 1991–92.

A site in the Erme Valley, Devon, shows sediment aggregation in late Roman and Post-Roman times due to tin mining on Dartmoor. There is a peak in activity between the 4th and 7th centuries. Tin slag at Week Ford in Devon has been dated to 570–890 AD.

St Piran (patron saint of tinners) is said to have landed at Perranporth from Ireland about 420 AD.

=== Medieval and modern mining ===
==== Middle Ages ====
There is no record of tin mining in Domesday Book, possibly because the rights were Crown property. During the first half of the 12th century Dartmoor provided most of the tin for Europe, exceeding the production of Cornwall. The Pipe Roll of Henry II gives the annual tin production of Dartmoor as about 60 tons. In 1198 he agreed that "all the diggers and buyers of black tin, and all the smelters of tin, and traders of tin in the first smelting shall have the just and ancient customs and liberties established in Devon and Cornwall." This shows that mining had been going on for a long time. A charter confirming the miners' rights was granted by King John in 1201. The alluvial silt record in the Erme Valley, Devon, shows a build-up of tin waste between 1288 and 1389.

Following the transfer of power to the Norman lord Robert, Count of Mortain, who held the manor of Trematon, silver mining became a major industry, particularly in the Tamar valley around Bere Ferrers in Devon. Established in 1292 by the Crown under Edward I, skilled labour was initially imported from Derbyshire and North Wales, with specialist expertise from Germany and capital from Italy. Profits from rights to the silver mines for the Crown led to the rise of the ancient Cornish Edgcumbe family at Cotehele and later Mount Edgcumbe.

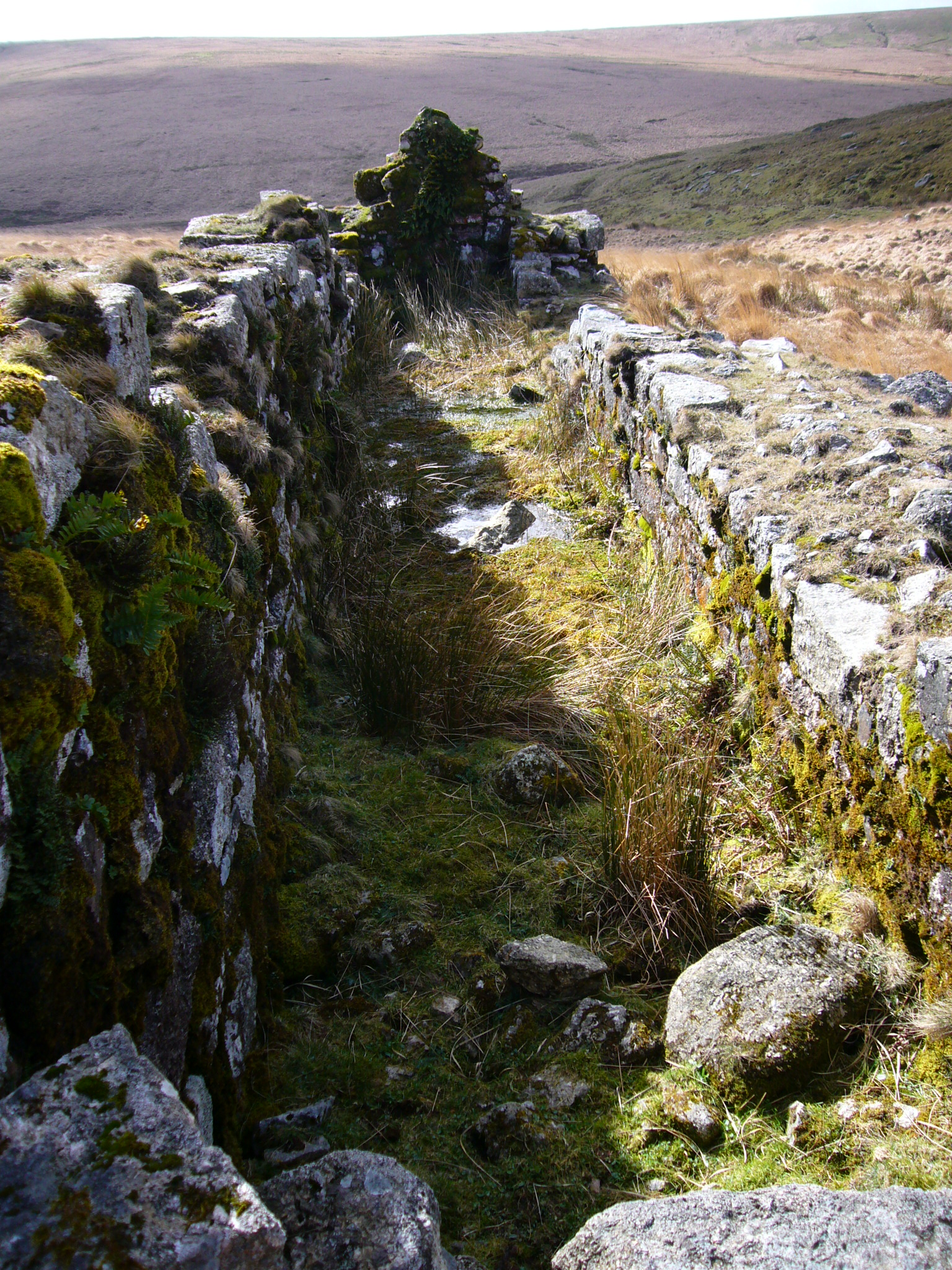
The wheelpit at Huntingdon mine

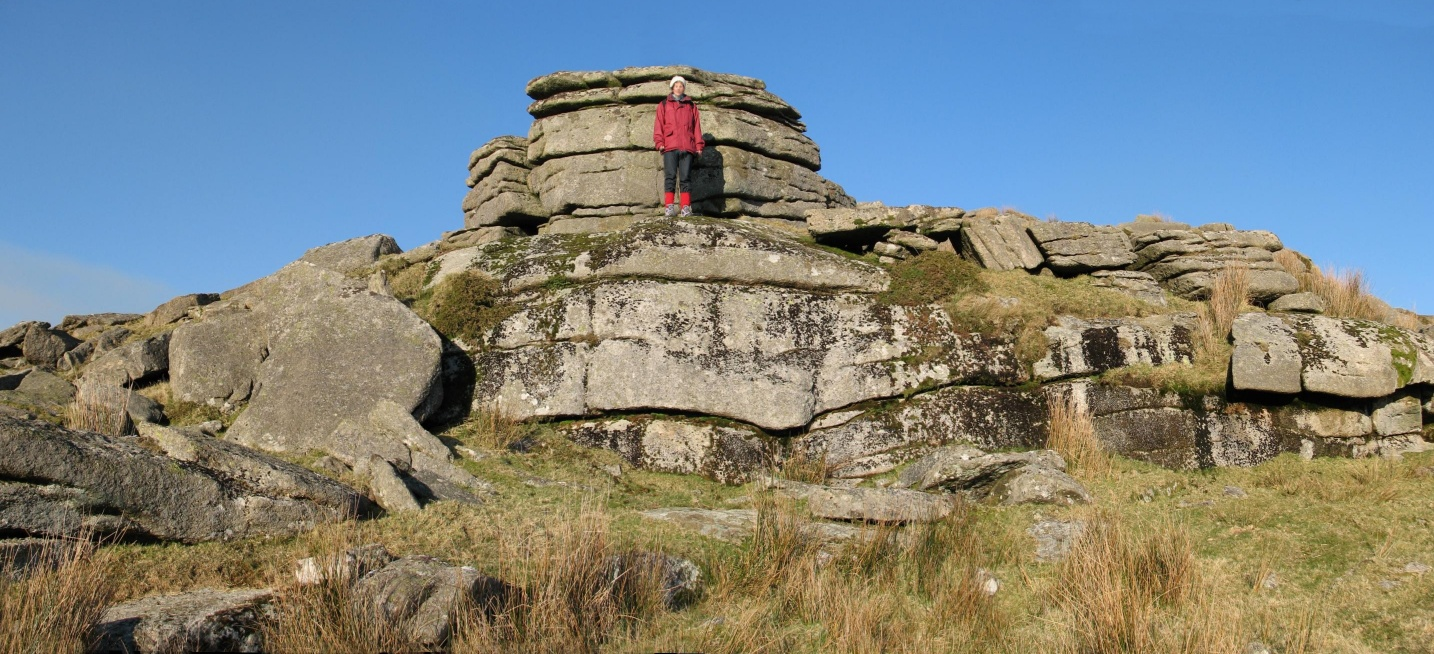
Crockern Tor – Parliament Rock as seen from the "floor" of the Great Court

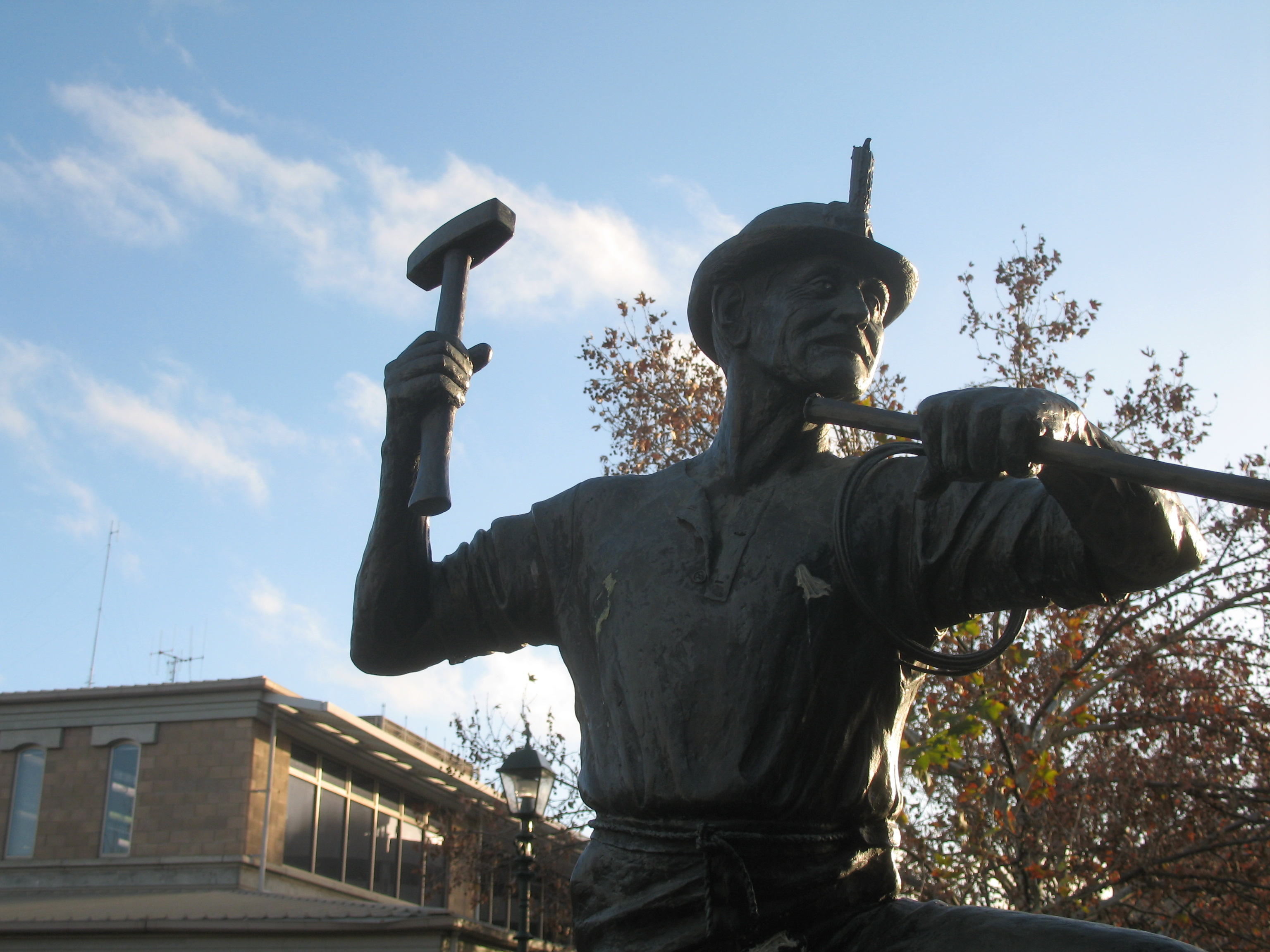
A statue commemorating Cornish and German miners in Bendigo, Victoria, Australia

In 1305 King Edward I established separate stannaries for Devon and Cornwall. Water was used to operate stamps to crush the ore, the lighter waste being washed away. The mineral "black tin" was placed in furnaces and layered with peat. The molten metal was poured into granite moulds which produced ingots of tin. These were taken on pack horses to the stannary towns for assaying. Usable deposits in Devon became worked out, and so Cornwall became the centre of tin production. In 1337 Cornish tin production was 650 tons, but in 1335 it had been reduced to 250 tons. In 1400 Cornish production rose to 800 tons. The production in Devon was only 25% of that of Cornwall in 1450–1470.

The tin works of Devon and Cornwall were of such importance that the medieval kings established stannary courts and stannary parliaments to administer the law in Cornwall and part of Devon. Up to the mid 16th century, Devon produced about 25–40% of the amount of tin that Cornwall did, but the total amount of tin production from both Cornwall and Devon during this period was relatively small.

Under the stannary system, tin was brought to coinage towns to be coined in coinage halls. The stannary towns in Cornwall were originally: Helston, Liskeard, Truro, Lostwithial and later Penzance. In Devon, the coinage towns were: Ashburton, Plympton, Chagford and Tavistock.

The Cornish Rebellion of 1497 originated among Cornish tin miners who opposed the raising of taxes by Henry VII to make war on Scotland. This levy was resented for the economic hardship it would cause; it also intruded on a special Cornish tax exemption. The rebels marched on London, gaining supporters as they went, but were defeated at the Battle of Deptford Bridge.

Quarrying was of very limited importance in medieval Cornwall. Stone for church building was very rarely imported from outside the county: they used whatever stone could be found within a short distance. For some ornamental features such as doorways, pillars and fonts good use was made of varieties of elvan (e.g. Polyphant and Catacleuze). The granite was not quarried but collected from the moorlands and worked on site. Quarrying of slate developed in north Cornwall in the later Middle Ages and later developed in early modern times into larger undertakings.

==== Early modern period ====
After the 1540s, Cornwall's production increased rapidly and Devon's production was only about 10–11% of that of Cornwall. From the mid-16th century the Devon stannaries generated very little income for the Crown, and they were sidelined under the Privilege of Parliament Act 1512. The first Crockern Tor stannary parliament in Devon was held in 1494 and the last in 1748. At Combe Martin several disused silver mines are located on the eastern ridge and evidence of tunnels can still be seen, as well as the remains of a wheelhouse used to lift ore from the mine. There are items in the Crown Jewels made from Combe Martin silver.

A second tin boom came around the 16th century when open cast mining was used. German miners who had knowledge of the techniques were employed. In 1689, Thomas Epsley, a Somerset man, developed a method to blast the very hard granite rock loose, using gunpowder with quill fuses. It revolutionised hard rock mining. Six days' work with a pick could be accomplished with one blast. There was a third boom in the 18th century when shafts were dug to extract the ore.

==== Later modern period ====
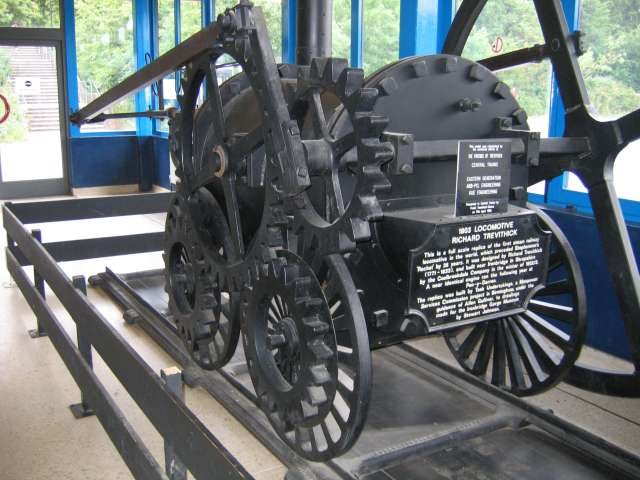
Richard Trevithick's steam engine

In the 19th century Cornish mining reached its zenith, before foreign competition depressed the price of copper, and later tin, to a level that made the extraction of Cornish ore unprofitable. The areas of Cornwall around Gwennap and St Day and on the coast around Porthtowan were among the richest mining areas in the world. At its height the Cornish tin mining industry had around 600 steam engines working to pump out the mines (many mines reached under the sea and some went down to great depths). Adventurers put up the capital, hoping that the mine would return them a profit, but the outcomes were very uncertain.

Caradon Hill had the most productive mine in east Cornwall. The South Caradon Copper Mine, 1 km (0.62 mi) to the southwest of the Caradon Hill transmitting station, was the largest copper mine in the UK in its heyday in the second half of the 19th century. Other disused copper and tin mines are scattered around the base of the hill. By the mid-19th century Looe had become a major port, one of Cornwall's largest, exporting local tin, arsenic, and granite, as well as hosting thriving fishing and boatbuilding industries. At Callington arsenic was found with copper ores and was processed by crushing and condensing; the poisonous nature of dust containing arsenic made the work very hazardous. Numerous precautions were taken but the workers tended to die in middle age. Menheniot was a centre of lead mining and is now surrounded by disused shafts and engine houses. Lead seams were discovered in the 1840s and Menheniot became the centre of a mining boom which lasted until the 1870s. During this period the population doubled. Kit Hill Country Park is steeped in mining history. Metals extracted included tin, silver, copper, and tungsten. The main mines were Kit Hill Summit Mines (which included a windmill near the present stack) (started about 1826; Kit Hill United closed in 1864); East Kit Hill Mine, worked from 1855 to 1909; Hingston Down mine (which worked westwards towards Kit Hill, may have started in the 17th century, it closed in 1885; and South Kit Hill Mine, worked from 1856 to 1884.

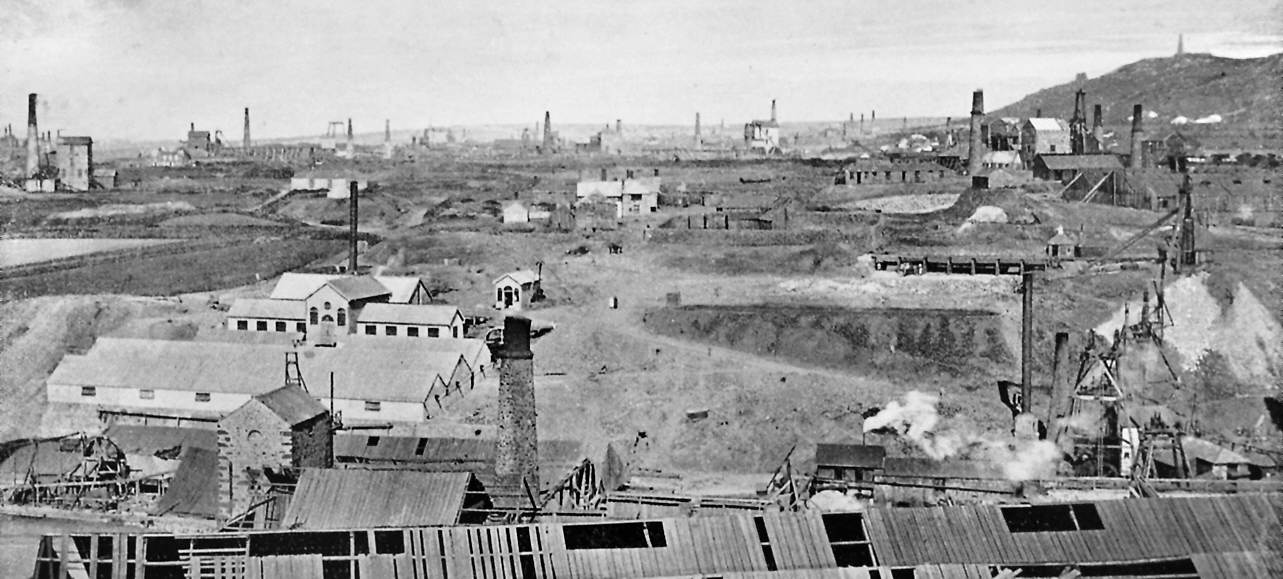
View from Dolcoath Mine towards Redruth, c. 1890

The last Cornish Stannary Parliament was held at Hingston Down in 1753, and the Devon Stannary Parliament last met in 1748. The Stannary Courts of Devon and Cornwall were combined in 1855 and their powers transferred to local authorities in 1896.

By the middle and late 19th century, Cornish mining was in decline, and many Cornish miners emigrated to developing mining districts overseas, where their skills were in demand: these included South Africa, Australia and North America. Cornish miners became dominant in the 1850s in the iron and copper districts of northern Michigan in the United States, as well as in many other mining districts. In the first six months of 1875, over 10,000 miners left Cornwall to find work overseas.

==== 20th century and after ====
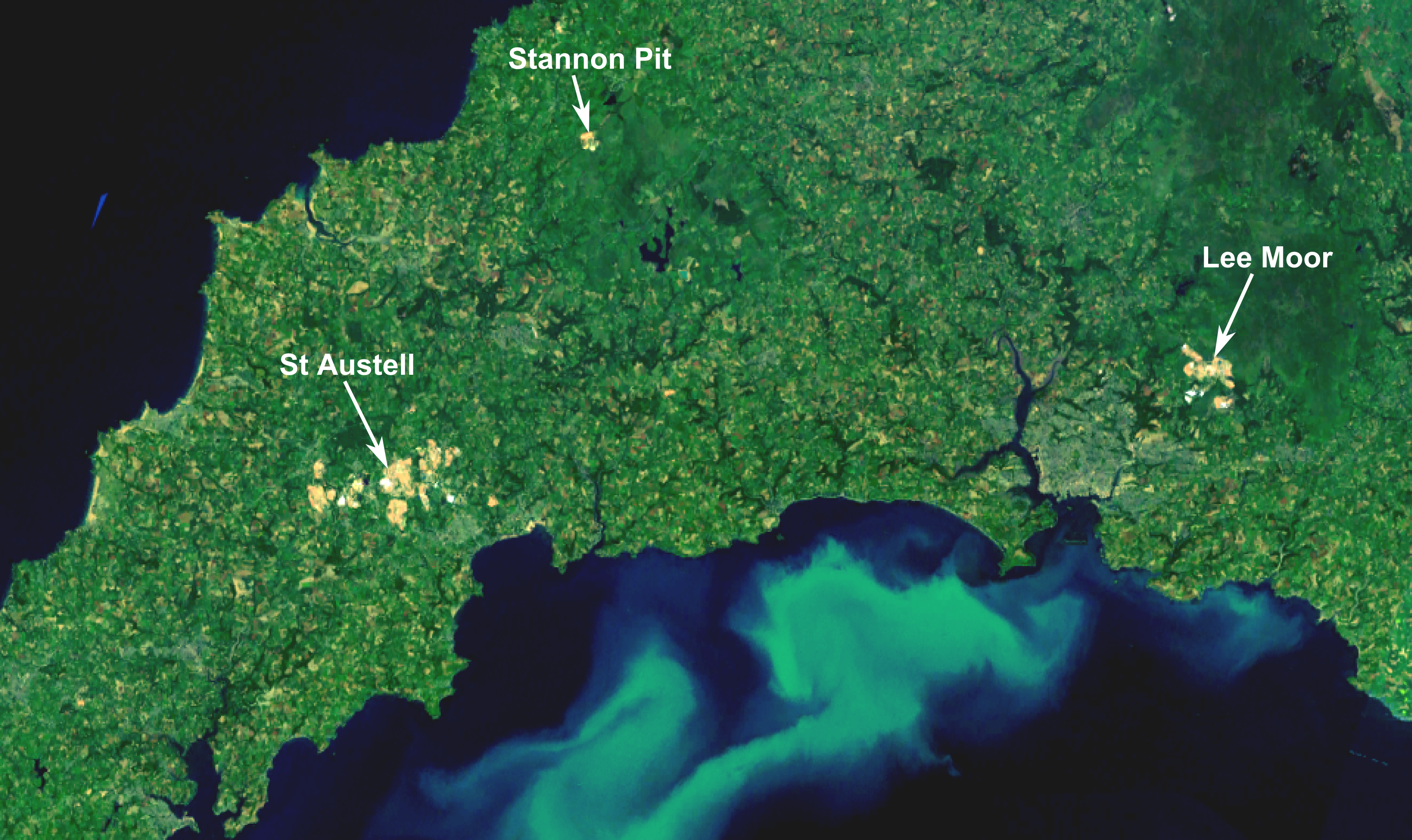
Satellite image of east Cornwall and west Devon marked to show the three locations of china clay extraction

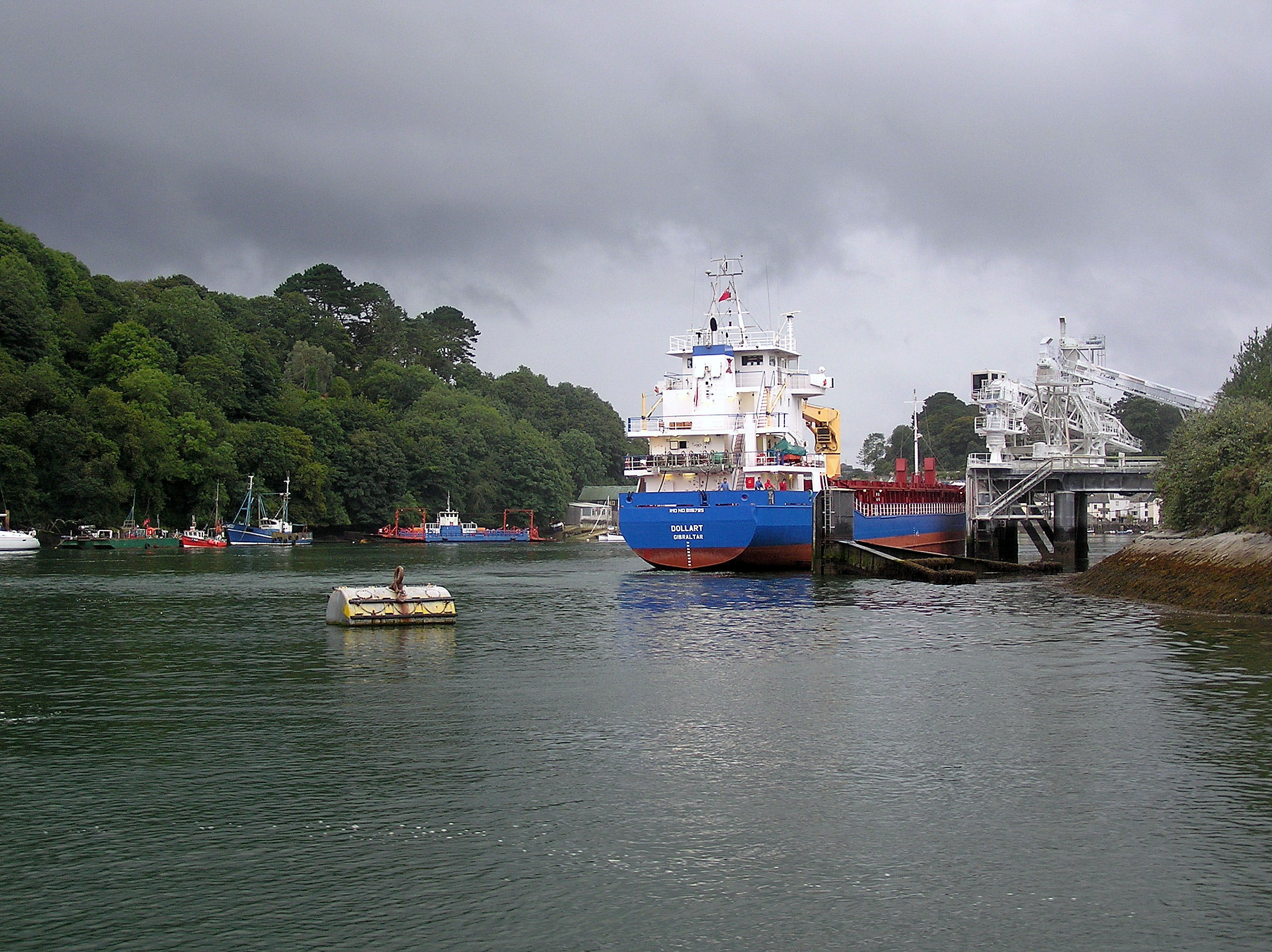
Loading china clay (kaolinite) at Carne Point, Fowey

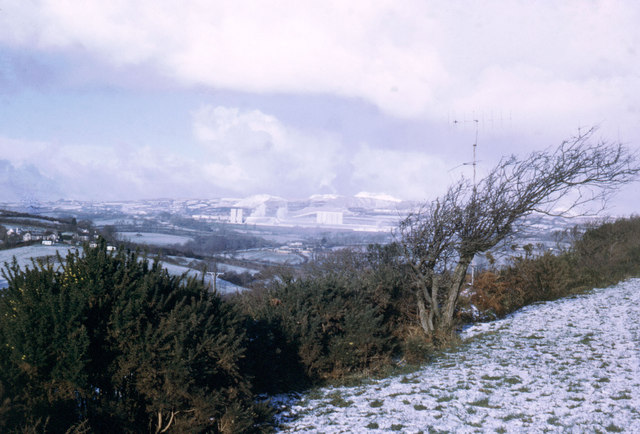
The Blackpool Dryers and Mills for processing china clay near Burngullow

During the 20th century, various ores were briefly profitable, and mines were reopened, but today none remain. Dolcoath mine (Cornish for Old Ground), the 'Queen of Cornish Mines', was 3,500 feet (1,100 m) deep, and was for many years the deepest mine in the world, not to mention one of the oldest before its closure in 1921. The last working tin mine in Europe was South Crofty, near Camborne, until its closure in March 1998. After an attempt was made to reopen it, it was abandoned. There were local media reports in September 2006 that South Crofty was being considered for re-opening as the price of tin had soared, but the site was subject to a compulsory purchase order (October 2006).

The collapse of the International Tin Council in 1986 was the end for Cornish and Devonian tin mining. The most recent mine in Devon to produce tin ore was Hemerdon Mine near Plympton in the 1980s. The last Cornish tin mine in production at South Crofty closed in 1998. The Hemerdon tungsten and tin mine in south-west Devon re-opened as Drakelands Mine in 2015.

In 1992, Geevor mine was acquired by Cornwall County Council as a heritage museum, which is now run by Pendeen Community Heritage. Both Geevor Tin Mine and Morwellham Quay have been selected as "anchor points" on the European Route of Industrial Heritage.

The extraction of china clay (kaolin) continues to be of considerable importance: the larger works are in the St Austell district. The amount of waste in proportion to kaolin is so great that huge waste mounds were created whose whiteness in the early years means that they can be seen from afar. The Eden Project has been developed on the site of a former china clay and tin quarry. Extraction of slate and roadstone by quarrying still continues on a reduced scale: it was formerly an important industry, and has been carried on in Cornwall ever since the Middle Ages. Several quarries have been productive enough to need their own mineral railways. Granite of high quality has been extracted from many Cornish quarries such as De Lank. Some granite has been taken very long distances for use in building. There are also some important quarries in Devon, such as Meldon (a source of railway ballast for the Southern Railway) and granite quarries on Dartmoor such as Merrivale.

In 2017, plans were reported to extract lithium reserves from beneath Cornwall by Cornish Lithium, which had signed an agreements to develop potential deposits.

In April 2019, a British-based company, MetAmpère Limited, drilled six lithium exploration holes in the UK at a site near St Austell. MetAmpère has successfully extracted lithium from hard rock at a laboratory scale, resulting in plans for a further 20 drill holes. In 2021, a new mine was extracting battery-grade lithium carbonate.

===== Disasters =====
In the metalliferous mines of Cornwall, some of the worst accidents were at East Wheal Rose in 1846, where 39 men were killed by a sudden flood; at Levant Mine in 1919, where 31 were killed and many injured in a failure of the man engine; 12 killed at Wheal Agar in 1883 when a cage fell down a shaft; and seven killed at Dolcoath mine in 1893, when a large stull collapsed.

== Main mining areas ==
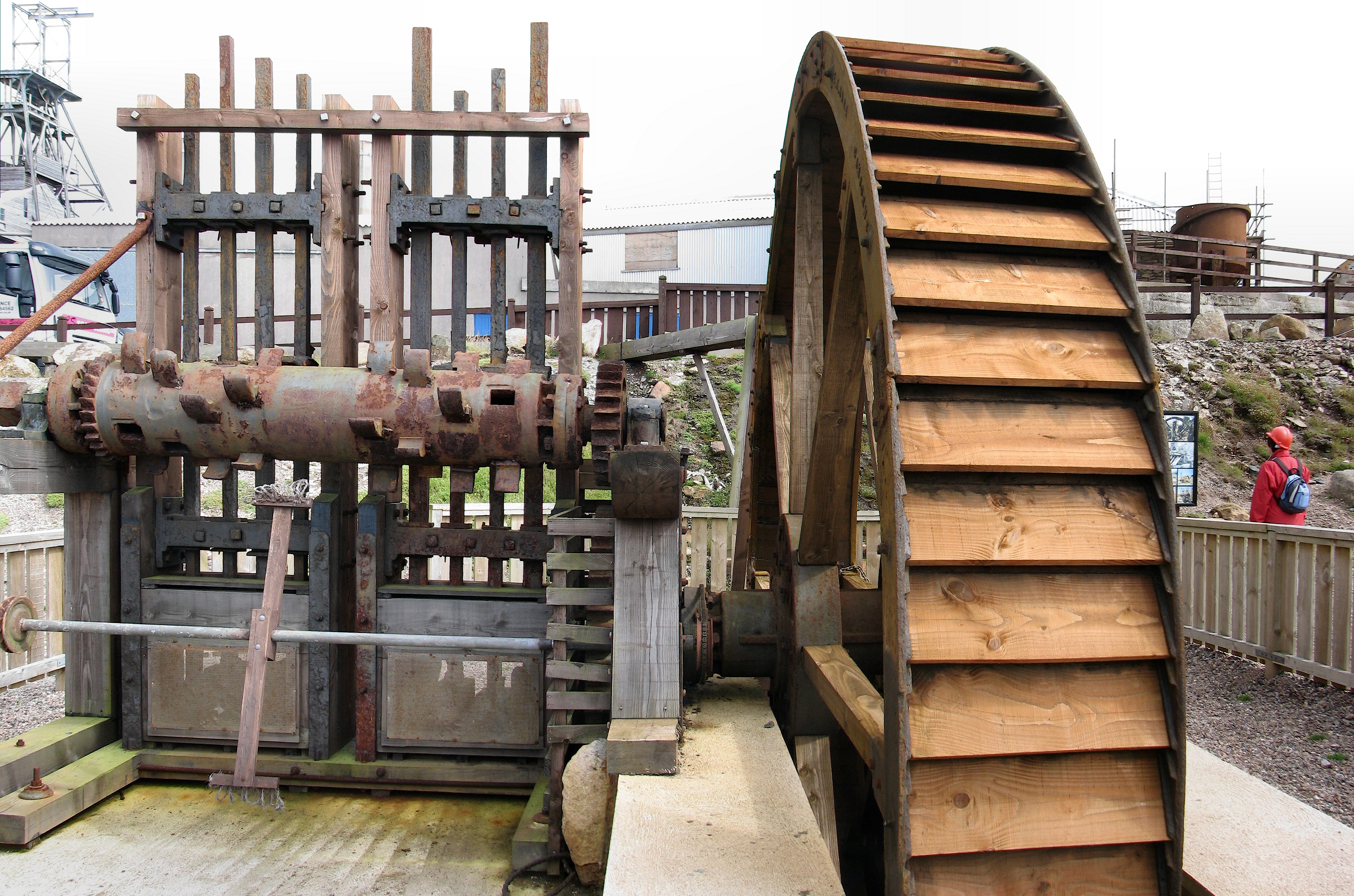
A stamp mill with eight tin stamps at Geevor Tin Mine

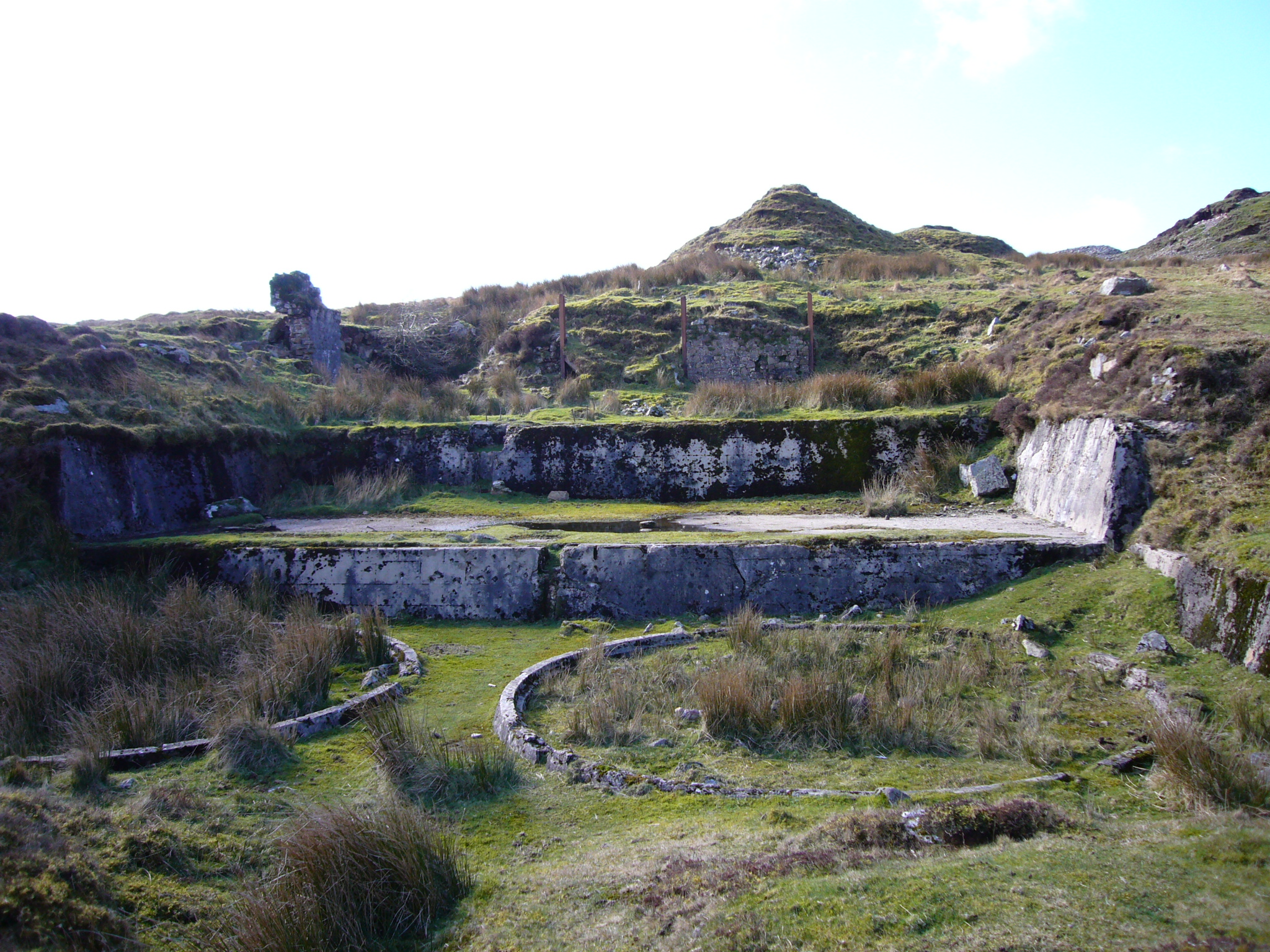
The dressing floor at Hooten Wheals, Dartmoor, showing the remains of two early 20th-century circular buddles

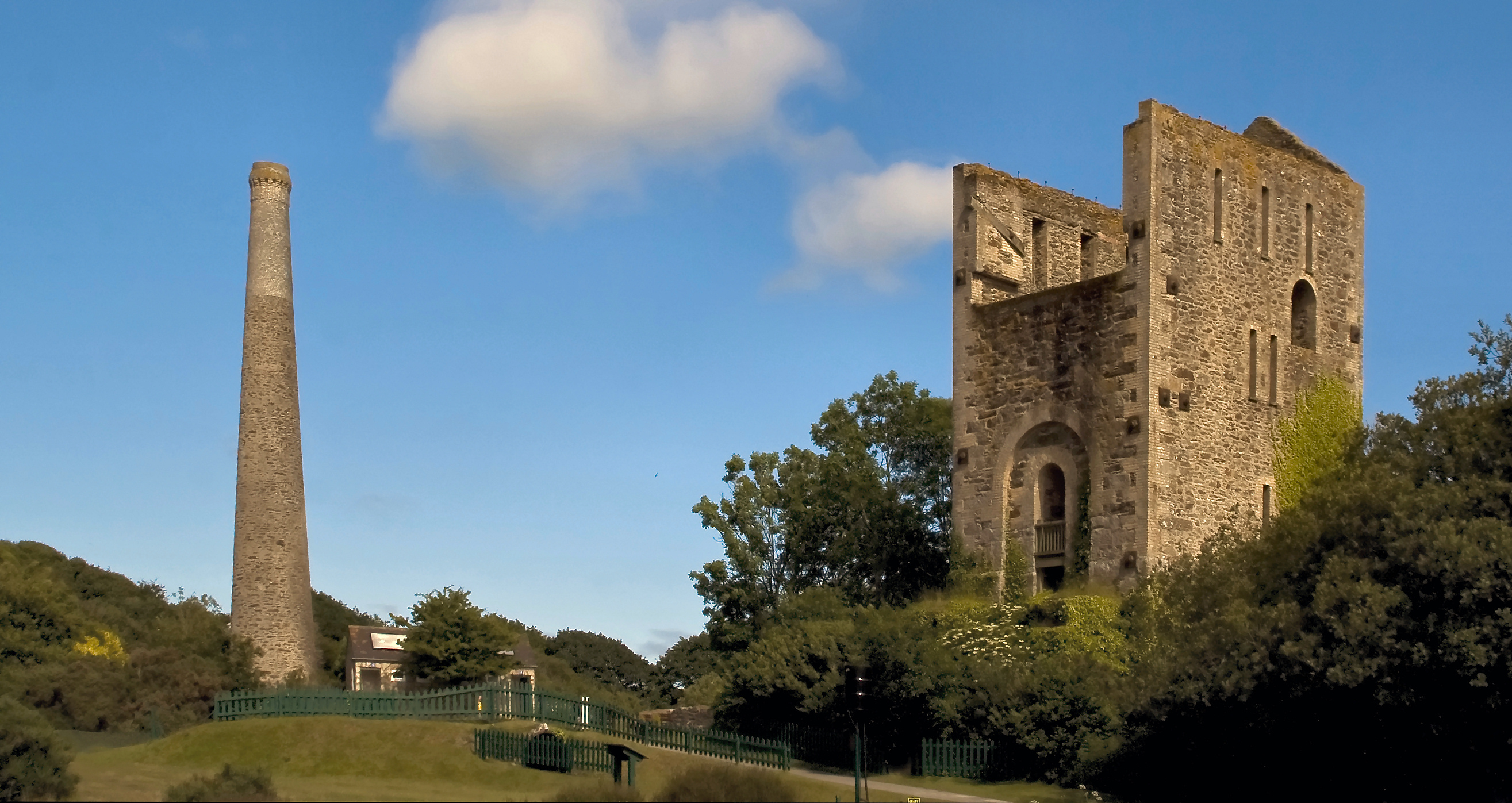
The preserved engine house and stack at East Wheal Rose

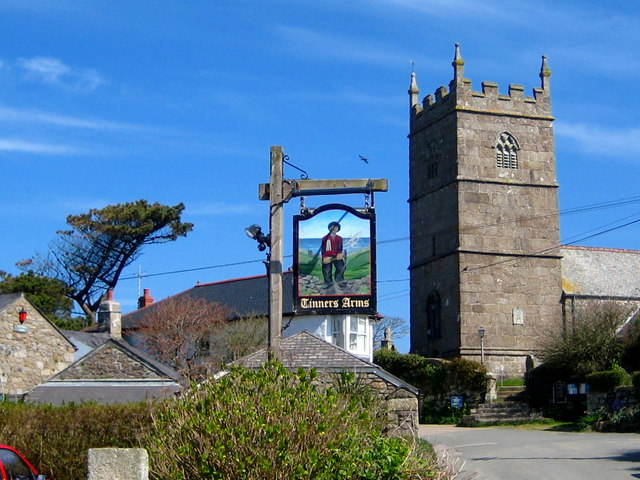
Church and pub at Zennor, with the sign of the Tinners Arms

Cornwall

- Penwith
  - St Just in Penwith and Zennor
- Camborne, Redruth and Illogan
- Gwennap and the Carnon Valley in west Cornwall
- Wendron area in Kerrier
- St Agnes and Porthtowan
- North Cornwall (a few mines but no tin)
- A large area bounded by St Austell, Wadebridge, Bodmin and Callington in mid and east Cornwall

River Tamar

- Tamar Valley - copper, tin, lead, silver, and arsenic. See Morwellham Quay. Particularly in the nineteenth century, ores were internationally traded through Plymouth Dock

Devon

- Lydford – an ancient Saxon burh; the early medieval location of the most westerly silver mint and later ceremonial parliament and prison of the Stannary Court for Dartmoor
- Bere Ferrers – a unique Crown-operated medieval silver (and lead) mine
- Combe Martin – lead/silver deposits
- Exmoor and Brendon Hills – iron lead, silver, copper
- Dartmoor – ancient stannary towns include Tavistock, Ashburton, Chagford and later Plympton
- West Devon
- Bampfylde Mine, North Molton
- Blackdown Hills – copper deposits

== Methods and processing ==
See Dartmoor tin-mining

== Study and education ==
The Royal Geological Society of Cornwall was founded in 1814 to promote the study of the geology of Cornwall, and is the second oldest geological society in the world. The Cornish Institute of Engineers was begun by mechanical engineers. Mining is an important area in which it is active.

=== Camborne School of Mines ===
Because of the importance of metal mining to the Cornish economy, the Camborne School of Mines (CSM), founded in 1888, developed as the only specialist hard rock education establishment in the United Kingdom. It continues to teach mining as well as many other earth-related subjects (e.g. engineering geology) relevant to the Cornish economy.

CSM now forms part of the University of Exeter, and has relocated to Penryn Campus. Despite this move, the School continues the use of "Camborne" in its name. CSM graduates are to be found working in the mining industry all over the world.

== Terminology and symbolism ==
Several Cornish mining words are still in use in English language mining terminology, such as costean, gunnies, vug, kibbal, gossan, mundic and kieve.

Fish, tin, and copper together are sometimes used as a symbol of Cornwall because they show the three main traditional industries of Cornwall. Tin has a special place in the Cornish culture, the Stannary Parliament, and 'Cornish pennies' are a testament to the former power of the Cornish tin industry. Cornish tin is highly prized for jewellery, often of mine engines or Celtic designs.

The houses at Penair School are named after four notable tin mines. Among the pubs whose names refer to tin mining are the Tinner's Arms in Zennor and the former Jolly Tinners pub in St Hilary. The pub sign at Zennor pictures a tin miner at work, testimony to its origins. The Jolly Tinners building at St Hilary was at one time used to accommodate the St Hilary Children's Home.

=== Three hares ===
The three hares is a circular motif which appears in sacred sites from the Middle and Far East to the churches of south west England (where it is often referred to as the "Tinners' Rabbits"). It occurs with the greatest frequency in the churches of the West Country of England. The motif appears in architectural wood carving, stone carving, window tracery, and stained glass. In South Western England there are nearly thirty recorded examples of the Three Hares appearing on 'roof bosses' (carved wooden knobs) on the ceilings in medieval churches in Devon, (particularly Dartmoor). There is a good example of a roof boss of the Three hares at Widecombe-in-the-Moor, Another exemplary roof boss can be found in the town of Tavistock, in Dartmoor, on the edge of the moor.

Tinners' Rabbits is the name of a dance of many forms involving use of sticks and rotation of three, six or nine dancers.

== World Heritage Site ==
Cornwall and West Devon Mining Landscape
UNESCO World Heritage Site
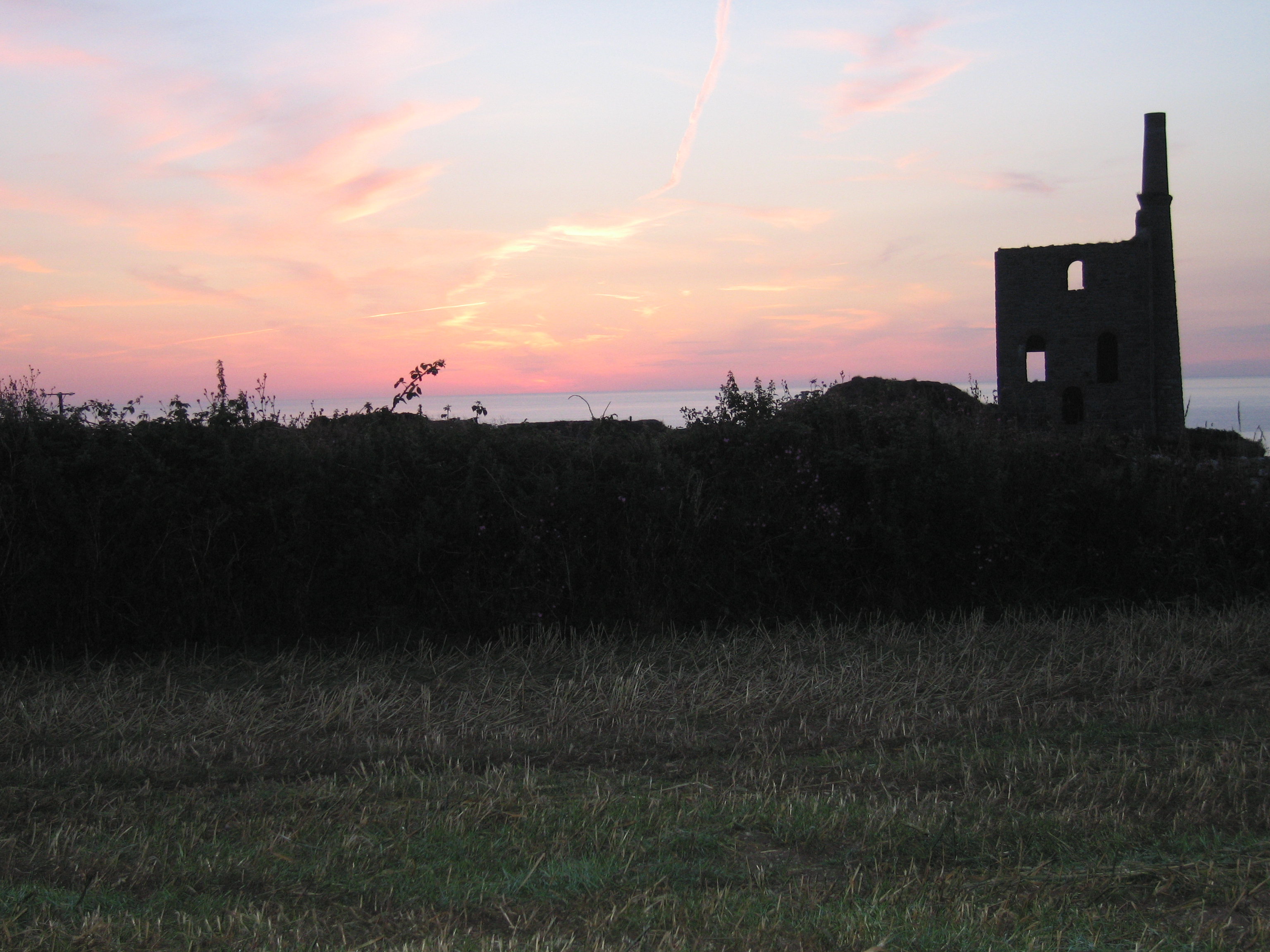
- Old tin mine workings near Pendeen in Cornwall
- Location: Cornwall and West Devon, United Kingdom
- Criteria: Cultural: (ii)(iii)(iv)
- Reference: 1215
- Inscription: 2006 (30th Session)
- Area: 19,719 ha (48,730 acres)

In 1999, the Cornwall and West Devon Mining Landscape was added to the UK government's tentative list for submission to the World Heritage list. It was announced on 13 July 2006 that the bid had been successful. This World Heritage Site is unique in that it covers a technique exported worldwide, including Mexico and Peru, and will consist of a trail linking mining sites from Land's End in Cornwall, through Porthtowan and St Agnes up the spine of the county to the Tamar Valley forming the border with Devon. There, the exporting port of Morwellham is being developed alongside the Devon Great Consols Mine to demonstrate the nature and scale of the operations, with the Eastern Gateway to the World Heritage Site being anchored in the ancient stannary town of Tavistock, the base for Devon's own 19th-century gold rush.

Heartlands, the £35m National Lottery funded regeneration project, and gateway to the Cornwall and West Devon Mining Landscape World Heritage Site, opened to the public on 20 April 2012. This free visitor attraction had been 14 years in the planning (since South Crofty mine closed in 1998).

In 2014, work was completed to preserve the iconic New Cooks Kitchen Headframe at South Crofty tin mine. at an approximate cost of £650,000.

== Individual mines ==
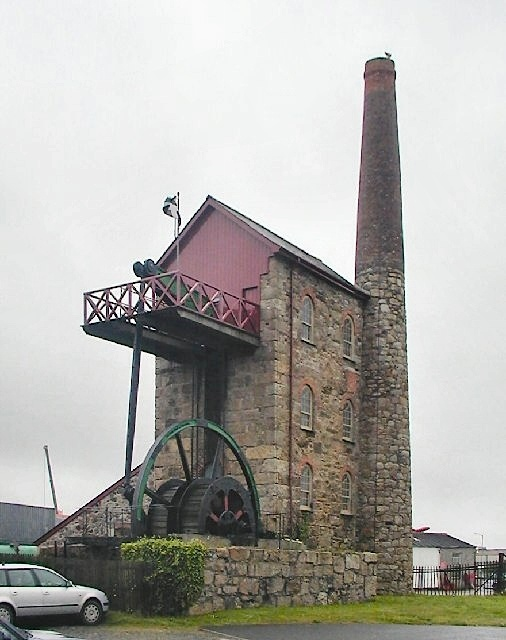
One of the preserved engine houses at Pool, housing a 30 inch engine

=== Hemerdon Mine ===
Hemerdon Mine, alternatively known as the Drakelands Mine or Hemerdon Ball or Hemerdon Bal Mine, is a historic tungsten and tin mine, 11 km (7 miles) NE of Plymouth, near Plympton, in Devon. It lies to the north of the villages of Sparkwell and Hemerdon and adjacent to the large china clay pits near Lee Moor. The mine, which had been out of operation since 1944, except for the brief operation of a trial mine in the 1980s, hosts one of the largest tungsten and tin deposits in the world. It restarted production in 2015.

=== South Crofty Mine ===
In November 2007 it was announced that South Crofty mine, near Camborne, may restart production in 2009. When it closed in 1998 it was Europe's last tin mine. Its owners Baseresult Holdings Ltd, which bought the mine in 2001, have created a new company, Western United Mines Limited (WUM), to operate it and has said it will be spending in excess of £50m on restarting the mine. The company claims that rising tin prices had given the mine, first opened in the late 16th century, another 80 years of life. More than £3.5m will be spent during the next seven months on continuing the mine development.

Crofty Developments, a partner of the new company, still has to resolve a row with the South West Regional Development Agency (RDA) over use of more than 30 acres (120,000 m^{2}) of land surrounding the site. The RDA wants to make a compulsory purchase order on the site for leisure, housing and industry, but Crofty Developments has been fighting in the High Court to retain the site. The Cornish mining industry, started in 2000 BC, reached its peak in the 19th century, when thousands of workers were employed in up to 2,000 mines, before the industry collapsed when ores began to be produced more cheaply abroad.

=== Partial list of Cornish mines ===
Mine	Opened	Closed	Operated by	Product	Production
Ale & Cakes	18th century	1870	United Mines (1780-1857) Clifford Amalgamated Mines (1857-1870)	Tin & Copper	
Alfred Consols	1801	1964		Copper, Tin & Lead	175,000 Tonnes of Copper
Balleswidden	1832	1877		Tin	
Basset & Grylls	1858	1913		Tin	
Belowda	1872	1902		Tin	
Binner Downs	1758	1830s		Copper, Iron, & Tin	4,500 tonnes per year 100 tonnes of Iron Ore
Blencowe Consols				Tin	
Blue Hills		1897		Tin	
Boiling Well	1815	1865		Copper, Lead, Silver, Zinc	2,900 tonnes of Copper; 410 tonnes of Lead; 54 tonnes of Zinc; 5,900 ounces of Silver
Boscaswell Downs	1850s			Tin & Copper	
Boscawen Mine	18th century			Copper, Tin & Zinc	
Boscean Mine	1584	?		Tin	
Bosorne	1820			Tin	
Boswedden				Tin & Copper	
Botallack Mine	1721	1914	Stephen Harvey James (1835–1870); Botallack Mines, Limited (1906–)	Tin arsenic copper	
Budnick Consols	1855	1912		Lead, Tin & Zinc	
Buttern Hill				Tin & Wolfram	
Cape Cornwall Mine	1839	1875	St Just Consolidated Tin and Copper Mining Company	Tin copper	
Carnon Mine	1824	1830		Tin	
Consolidated Mines	1782	1857		copper	
Ding Dong mines	c. 17th century	1879		Tin	
Dolcoath mine	1720	1920		Tin copper	
East Wheal Rose	?	1886		lead	
Geevor Tin Mine	1780	1991	Geevor Tin Mines Ltd	Tin	
Great North Downs	18th century	1846		Tin; Arsenic; Copper	
Great Wheal Busy	1720	1909		copper arsenic Tin	100,000 tons
Great Wheal Charlotte	before 1820	1840		Copper some Tin	2,800 tons (1834–6)
Killifreth Mine		1927		copper arsenic tin	
King Edward Mine			Camborne School of Mines (1890–)	Tin	
Levant Tin Mine	1748	1930	Levant Mining Company (1820–1930); National Trust (1967–)	Copper; Tin; Arsenic	
Mount Wellington Tin Mine	1976	1991	Kensa Heat Pumps (2001–)	Tin	
Poldark Mine (Wheal Roots)	1720	1780		Tin	
South Crofty	1590s	1998	South Crofty Limited (1906–1967); Siamese Tin Syndicate Ltd (1967–1982); Rio Tinto (1982–1988); Carnon Holdings Limited (1988–1994); Crew Natural Resources of Canada (1994–2001); Base Result (2001-2007); Western United Mines Limited (2007-2011); Celeste Copper Corporation (2011-2016) Strongbow Minerals Limited 2016 -	Tin	400,000 tonnes
Wheal Briggan	?	?		Copper	
Wheal Boys	?	?		Tin; Copper	
Wheal Castle	?	?		Tin & Copper	
Wheal Drea	?	?		Tin	
Wheal Edward	?	?		Tin & Copper	
Wheal Godolphin	c. 16th century	1930	Godolphin Family	Tin	
Wheal Gorland	1792	1909	St Day United; Edgar Allen and Company (1906-1909)	Arsenic; Copper; Tin; Tungsten	
Wheal Jane	1750	1992	Falmouth Consolidated Mines (1906–1915); Consolidated Gold Fields (1960–1969); Rio Tinto Group (1969–1980) management consortium (1970–)	Tin; Silver; Zinc	
Wheal Owles	1700	1893		Tin & Copper	
Wheal Peevor	1701	1889		Tin & Copper	
Wheal Plenty	?	?		Copper	
Wheal Prosper	1860	1866		Tin & Copper	
Wheal Rose	?	?		Tin & Copper	
Wheal Trewavas	1834	1846		Tin & Copper	
Wheal Vor	c. 16th century	1910		Tin & Copper	
South Terras Mine	c1870	1937	Union Mines Ltd, Uranium Mines Ltd, Minerals Research Syndicate, British Metalliferous Mines Ltd, Societie Industrielle Du Radium	Uranium, Radium, Tin, Iron, Ochre	> 2,000ts U, > 10g Ra

== Railways ==
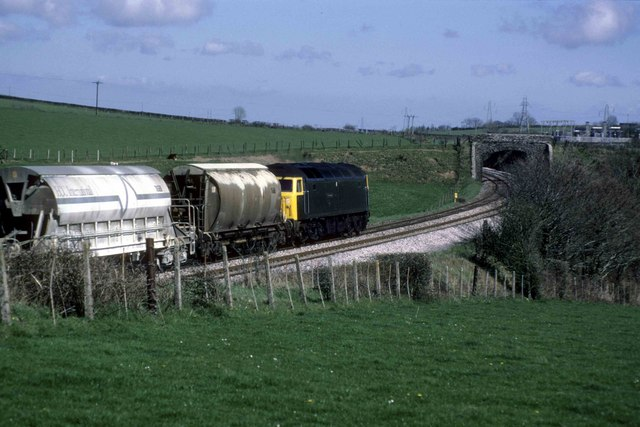
A freight train of china clay

Note: The term "mineral railway" is usually understood to mean a railway operated in direct association with a single mine or a group of mines. An ordinary railway might convey the traffic of any consignor. However the terminology is not exact.

=== Cornwall Minerals Railway ===
The Cornwall Minerals Railway opened in 1874, connecting harbours at Fowey and Newquay and sites of mineral extraction in the area between them, in particular in the Bugle and St Dennis areas. The railway absorbed and extended several existing short mineral lines.

=== East Cornwall Mineral Railway ===
The ECMR connected copper extractive industries in the Kit Hill area to a quay at Calstock on the Tamar.

=== Hayle Railway ===
The Hayle Railway opened in 1837, serving engineering works and copper quays at Hayle and the copper mines of Redruth and Camborne.

=== List of mineral railways in Cornwall ===
Name	Opened	Closed	Gauge	Location	Notes
Basset Mines Tramway	before 1907	1918	20 in (508 mm)	Redruth	Steam locomotive worked line connecting the West Basset Mine and the stamps at Carnkie
Botallack Mine	before 1864		800 mm (2 ft 7 1/2 in)	St Just	300-yard surface line and cliff-side inclines into the mine.
Camborne Mines Ltd. Pendarves Mine		after 1979	600 mm (1 ft 11 5/8 in)	Camborne	Underground railway serving the Pendarves tin mine
Cornwall Tin and Mining Corporation Mount Wellington Mine		by 1979	2 ft (610 mm)	Twelveheads	Underground Tin mine
CTS Mining Ltd. Wheal Concord mine		after 1987	2 ft (610 mm)	Blackwater	Underground mine railway using battery electric locomotives
Geevor Tin Mines Ltd. Pendeen Mine	1911	1991	18 in (457 mm)	St Just	Extensive underground tin mine railway. Part of the site, with reinstated tramway, has been reopened as the Geevor Tin Mines Museum.
Rosevale Historical Mining Company	1974	present	2 ft (610 mm) and 18 in (457 mm)	Zennor	Newly re-opened tin mine using battery-electric locomotives
South Crofty Mine	1900	1998	1 ft 10 in (559 mm) and 18 in (457 mm)	Camborne	Extensive tin mine with internal railway. The mine was re-opened in 2001 although currently without the use of railway transport.
Wheal Jane Ltd. Clemo's Shaft	1965	1992	2 ft (610 mm)	Baldhu	Locomotive-worked Cornish tin mine.
Wheal Pendarves Ltd. Wheal Pendarves mine		after 1987	600 mm (1 ft 11 5/8 in)	Camborne	Locomotive-worked Cornish tin mine.

== Mineral statistics ==
Cornwall Mineral Production (Tons)
Year	White Tin	Black Tin	Tin	Copper Ore	Copper Metal	Lead Ore	Silver	Zinc	Uranium	Tungsten	Arsenic
1845				149834		6063					
1846				132444		4933					
1847				137665		7304					
1848		10176		127226		6614					
1849		10719		126650		6773					
1850		10383		134020		6783					
1851		9455		127285		6709	9.27125				
1852		9674		165593	11777	6220	10.667125				
1853	5763	8866		181944	11914	4690	9.6875				
1854	5947	8747		184858	11979	5005	9.34259375				477
1855	6000	8947		161576	10520	5882	9.41425				443
1856	6177	9350		163980	10520	6597	10.184125		1		514
1857	6582	9783		152729	9869	6036	8.57778125				47
1858	6920	10618		147330	9727	5437	8.64234375				396
1859	7100	10670		143238	9628	4986	8.83871875		0.01	27	445
1860	695	10426		145359	9530	4243	7.30675			19	515
1861	7450	11640		143119	9169	4229	6.82909375			7	539
1862	8476	14127		141800	9063	4119	7.65396875			12	901
1863	10006	15157		129229	8411	4271	7.08340625			13	721
1864	10108	15211		127633	7964	3539	6.6785			2	633
1865	10039	15686		121253	7413	4296	7.766375			2	827
1866	9990	15080		103670	6551	4351	6.50734375				1117
1867	8700	13649		88660	5995	6481	10.251375			11	1200
1868	9300	13953		86722	5726	6310	10.7124375			9	1267
1869	9760	14725		71790	5144	6775	10.72346875			25	1189
1870	10200	15234		56526	4148	6360	9.89846875			51	1813
1871	10900	16272		46766	3340	5673	8.78528125			20	4148
1872	9560	14266		41902	2944	4099	6.8156875			88	2950
1873	9972	14885		40285	2973	2923	4.25371875			50	3480
1874	9942	14039		40455	2771	2337	2.84728125			33	2286
1875	9614	13995		49393	2698	1932	0.94446875			46	2412
1876	8500	13688		43016	3034	2070	1.360625			23	2557
1877	9500	14142		39225	2938	1674	0.87446875		0.1	15	1718
1878	10106	15045		36871	2903	1022	0.6169375		0.4	10	1843
1879	9532	14665		30371	2342	545	0.3546875			13	1659
1880	8918	13737		26737	2004	570	0.3755			1	2044
1881	8615	12898		24510	1881	409	0.45175	3508		54	2775
1882	9300	14170		25641	1886	454	0.36015625	2190		58	3473
1883	9262	14399		23250	1362	588	0.29515625	627		111	3380
1884	9559	15091		21539	1792	352	0.15625	352		64	3347
1885	9296	14323		19734	1578	160	0.078125	281		374	3889
1886	9241	14124		7541	680	168	0.06875	263		151	1791
1887	9215	14083		3415	358	0	0	228		55	1661
1888	9184	14282		6838	688	0	0	64		62	1584
1889	8877	13756		4959	496	0	0	60		0.5	1927
1890	9574	14868		5271	375	0	0	0	22	104	3143
1891	9324	14444		4290	305	0	0	0	31	138	3048
1892	9205	14260		2813	200	11	0	6	37	125	2567
1893	8803	13637		2673	190	0	0	10	25	22	1751
1894	8307	12880		3362	239	0	0	27	19	0	1900
1895	6627	10582		5504	391	0	0	0	40	0	1821
1896	4834	7657		5616	399	0	0	25	35	43	1366
1897	4452	7120		4140	294	0	0	26	30	125	1014
1898	4647	7378		5293	376	0	0	0	26	326	1062
1899	4011	6389		5172	367	0	0	11	7	94	1361
1900	4263	6792		5926	462	0	0	4	41	8	1160
1901	4594	7278		4251	332	0	0	92	79	21	1258
1902	4387	7552		4547	318	0	0	0	52	10	1029
1903	4265	7354		5351	401	0	0.0073125	4	6	269	690
1904	4126	6733		4433	347	0	0	0	0	161	827
1905	4451	7174		4651	358	134	0.248	1	103	167	1523
1906	4496	7114		3053	316	112	0.21875	8	11	253	1599
1907	4340	6986		2802	310	106	0.225	158	71	259	1368
1908	4909	7816		1556	152	47	0.10059375	17	71	224	1409
1909	5108	8166		1580	142	0	0	321	6	343	1817
1910	4734	7483		870	71	1	0	0	76	259	1817
1911	4817	7665		988	94	2	0	70	67	246	1912
1912	5181	8064		590	99	3	0	0	42	189	2011
1913	5220	8257		421	58	4	0	0	95	183	1449
1914	4988	7987		500	50	5	0	0	344	206	1706
1915		6325		461				0	82	314	2179
1916		6068		605				0	51	151	2256
1917		5231		617				0	13	205	2083
1918		5340		619				0		220	1790
1919		5128		63				0		166	2093
1920		4832	3100	81				0	60	91	1752
1921			700								
1922			3400								
1923			1000								
1924			2000								
1925			2300								
1926			2300								
1927			2600								
1928			2800								
1929			3300								
1930			2500								
1931			600								
1932			1300								
1933			1500								
1934			2000								
1935			2100								
1936			2100								
1937			2000								
1938			2000								
1939			1800								
1940			1600								
1941			1500								
1942			1400								
1943			1400								
1944			1300								
1945			1000								
1946			900								
1947			800								
1948			900								
1949			900								
1950			900								
1951			900								
1952			900								
1953			1000								
1954			900								
1955			1100								
1956			1100								
1957			1100								
1958			1100								
1959			1200								
1960			1200								
1961			1200								
1962			1200								
1963			1300								
1964			1300								
1965			1300								
1966			1300								
1967			1400								
1968			1600								
1969			1700								
1970			1700								
1971			1800								
1972			3300								
1973			3600								
1974			3800		480			2810			
1975			4100		562		2.6	3092			
1976			4000		414		2.08	3020			
1977			4200		350		1.4	4348			
1978			3200		116		0.35	1676			
1979			2700		60						
1980			3300		297			4332			
1981			3700		665		3.04	10855			
1982			4200		726		3.04	10186			
1983			4000		740		2.71	8880			
1984			5200		756		2.58	7478			
1985			5200		596			5344			
1986			4300		602			5659			
1987			4000		750			6557			
1988			3400		732			5502			
1989			3800		508			5771			
1990			3400		945			6593			
1991			2300		290			887			
1992			2000								
1993			2200								
1994			1900								
1995			2000								
1996			2100								
1997			2400								
1998			500								
Totals	457,969	798,696	169,100	4,072,680	219,951	170,470	223.275	101,343	1,543	6,328	114,729

Bal maidens at work, showing traditional dress

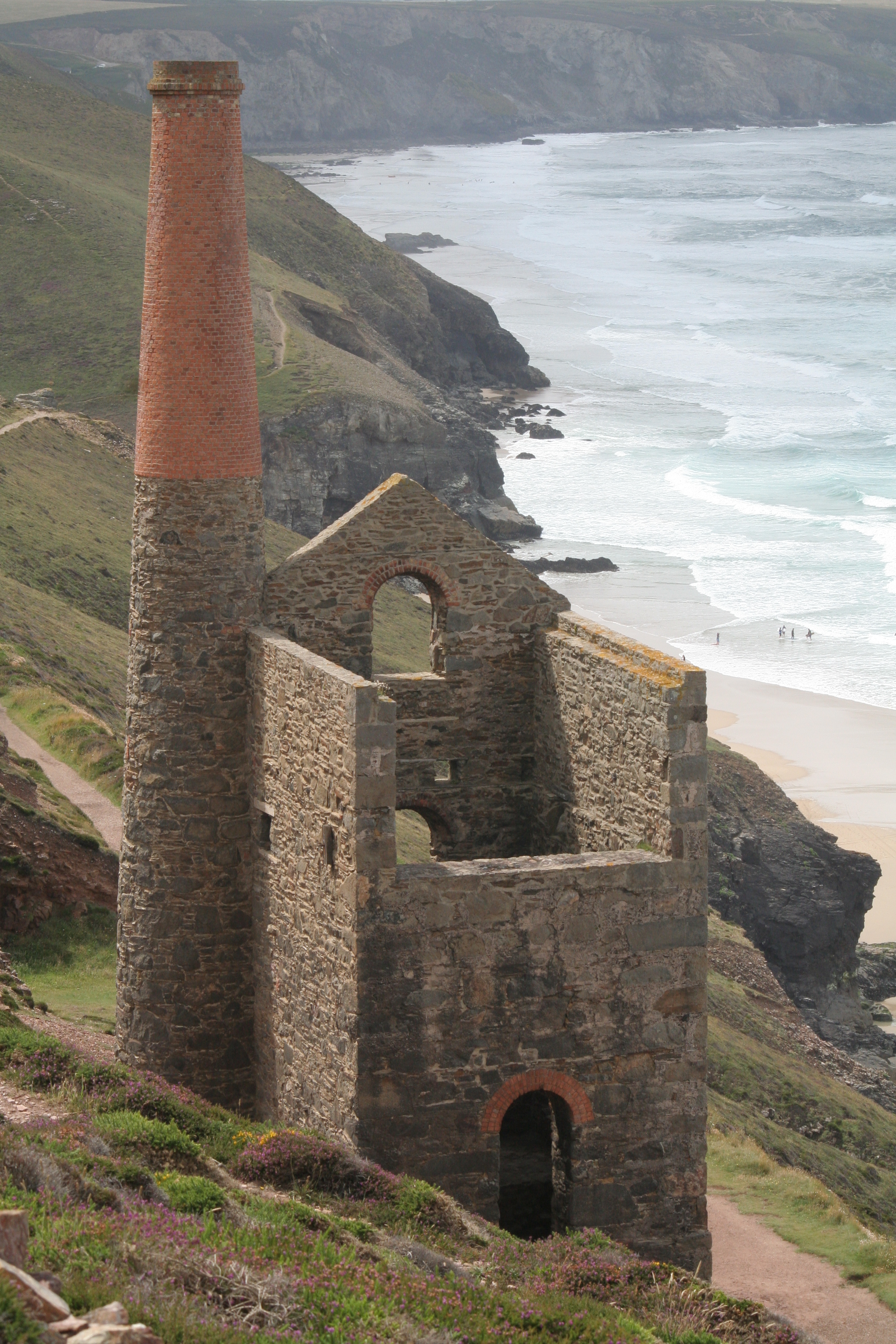
Wheal Coates, St Agnes

== See also ==
- Bal maidens, female ore dressers
- Beam engine
- Come, all ye jolly tinner boys
- Cornish emigration
- Cornish engine
- Cornish Foreshore Case
- Cornish Mines & Engines
- Cornwall and West Devon Mining Landscape, a World Heritage Site
- Dartmoor tin-mining
- Geology of Cornwall
- Hayle, centre of copper smelting
- John Taylor, inventor of the Cornish rolls
- Kenneth Hamilton Jenkin, historian
- Knocker, said to inhabit the mines
- Lostwithiel Stannary Palace
- Mineral Tramway Trails
- Morwellham Quay, inland port
- Robert Hunt, mineralogist and statistician
- Tin sources and trade in ancient times
- Welcome Stranger (a notable nugget of gold found by two Cornish miners in Victoria, Australia)
- William Jory Henwood, mining geologist
- Williams family of Caerhays and Burncoose, mining entrepreneurs
- Scorrier House, seat of the Williams family
- Tin coinage
- Helston Coinage hall
- Stannary
