= K. Aslihan Yener =

Turkish American archaeologist

K. Aslıhan Yener
- Born: 21 July 1946 (age 80); Turkey
- Citizenship: Turkey, United States
- Education: Adelphi University, Columbia University
- Known for: Bronze Age tin mines in Anatolia
- Scientific career
- Fields: Archaeology, Art History
- Workplaces: Robert College, University of Chicago, Boğaziçi University, Koç University
- Thesis: Göltepe Excavations: Tin Production at an Early Bronze Age Mining Town in the Central Taurus Mountains, Turkey (2021)

K. Aslıhan Yener, often anglicised as K. Aslihan Yener (21 July 1946), is a Turkish American archaeologist whose work on Bronze Age tin mines in Anatolia revealed a new possible source of the important metal.

== Early life and education ==
Yener was born in Istanbul to Turkish parents, and moved to the United States, in New Rochelle, New York at the age of six months. In 1964, she entered Adelphi University in Garden City, New York planning to study chemistry. Soon she visited her native Turkey and subsequently transferred to Robert College in Istanbul in 1966, where she studied the humanities. While studying a course in Roman ruins in Turkey, she noticed and became interested in the earlier prehistoric periods at those sites. After graduating from Robert College in 1969 she continued graduate school and majored in archaeology. She received her PhD from Columbia University in New York in 1980, and was an associate professor of history at Boğaziçi University from 1980 to 1988.

== Career ==
Aslıhan Yener became a professor of Anatolian Archaeology in the Archaeology and History of Art Dept. at Koç University and an associate professor of Near Eastern Languages and Civilizations Department at the University of Chicago, Oriental Institute.

Aslıhan Yener joined the Oriental Institute at the University of Chicago in 1993, where she is currently Associate Professor of Near Eastern Archaeology. She is currently the director of the Asi River Valley Regional Project and conducts research on the site of Alalah, which was the capital of the Mukish Kingdom during the Hittite period (Late Bronze Age, 2000-1200 BC).

She is currently an emeritus associate professor at the University of Chicago.

== Book ==
Yener is the author of the book The domestication of metals: the rise of complex metal industries in Anatolia (Brill, 2000).

== See also ==
- Bronze Age
- Tin sources and trade in ancient times
- Göltepe
