= Cassiterides =

Ancient geographical name used to refer to an unidentified group of islands

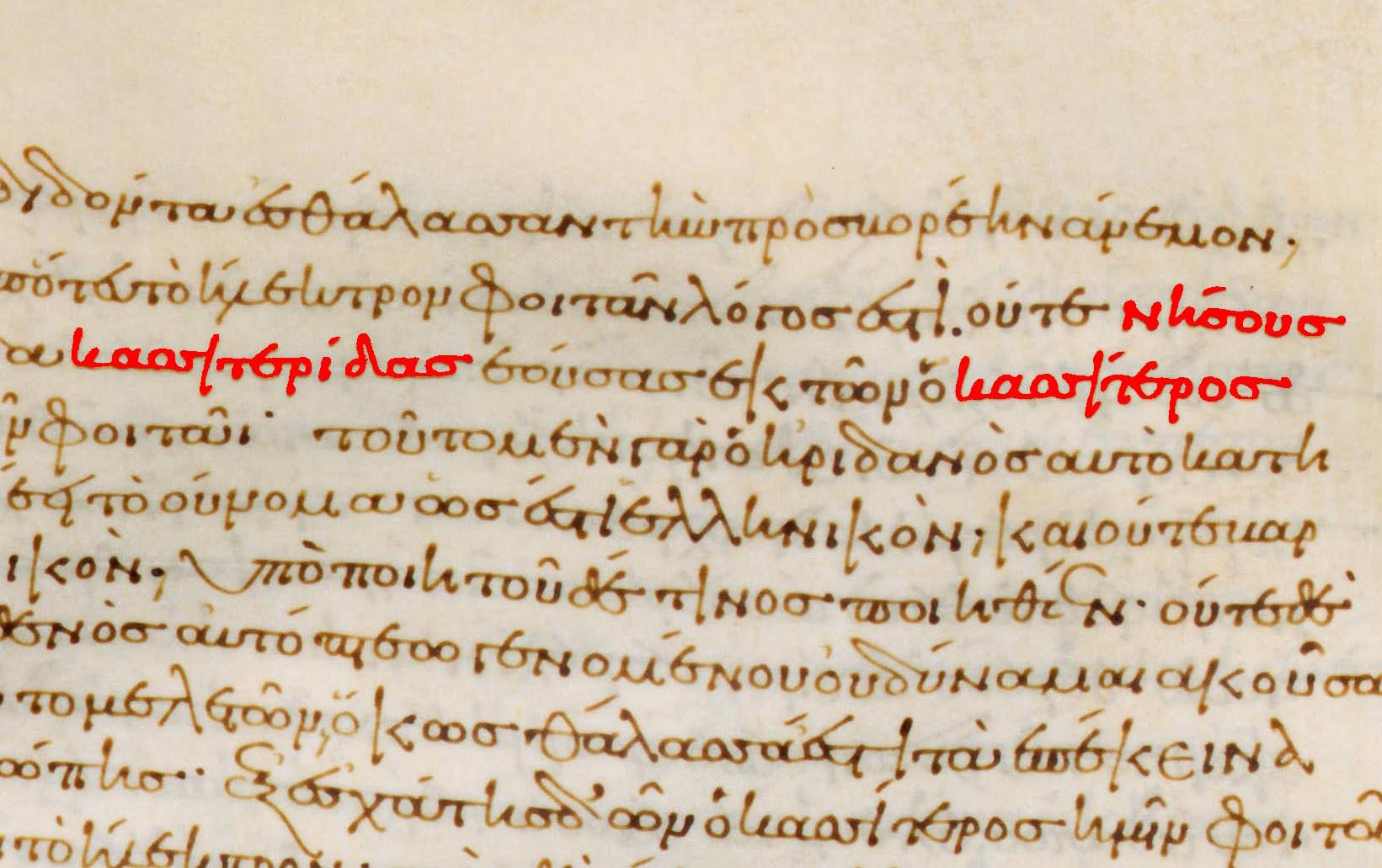
- Herodotus' the Histories 3.115 in Codex Laurentianus Plut. 70.3 (10th century) with Cassiterides (Κασσιτερίδας) highlighted.

In-universe information
- Type: Phantom island

The Cassiterides (Ancient Greek: Κασσιτερίδες, meaning "tin place", from κασσίτερος, kassíteros "tin") are an ancient geographical name used to refer to a group of islands whose precise location is unknown, but which was believed to be situated somewhere near the west coast of Europe.

Κασσιτερίδας simply means "places of tin", but Herodotus (5.115) describes them as "νήσους οἶδα Κασσιτερίδας" or "tin islands".

== Quotes ==
=== Herodotus ===
Herodotus, whilst a subject of the Achaemenid Empire in 5th century BC Halicarnassus, wrote in Ancient Greek about how his civilization received its tin and amber from western Europe, with whose geography he was unfamiliar (Hist. 3.115):

αὗται μέν νυν ἔν τε τῇ Ἀσίῃ ἐσχατιαί εἰσι καὶ ἐν τῇ Λιβύῃ. περὶ δὲ τῶν ἐν τῇ Εὐρώπῃ τῶν πρὸς ἑσπέρην ἐσχατιέων ἔχω μὲν οὐκ ἀτρεκέως λέγειν· οὔτε γὰρ ἔγωγε ἐνδέκομαι Ἠριδανὸν καλέεσθαι πρὸς βαρβάρων ποταμὸν ἐκδιδόντα ἐς θάλασσαν τὴν πρὸς βορέην ἄνεμον, ἀπʼ ὅτευ τὸ ἤλεκτρον φοιτᾶν λόγος ἐστί, οὔτε νήσους οἶδα Κασσιτερίδας ἐούσας, ἐκ τῶν ὁ κασσίτερος ἡμῖν φοιτᾷ.

English translation:

These then are the most distant lands in Asia and Libya. But concerning those in Europe that are the farthest away towards evening, I cannot speak with assurance; for I do not believe that there is a river called by foreigners Eridanus issuing into the northern sea, where our amber is said to come from, nor do I have any knowledge of Tin Islands, where our tin is brought from.

=== Strabo ===
Strabo's passage on the Cassiterides is quite detailed, placing them in an Iberian context, separate from Britain (Geog. 3.5.11):

The Cassiterides are ten in number, and lie near each other in the ocean towards the north from the haven of the Artabri. One of them is desert, but the others are inhabited by men in black cloaks, clad in tunics reaching to the feet, girt about the breast, and walking with staves, thus resembling the Furies we see in tragic representations. They subsist by their cattle, leading for the most part a wandering life. Of the metals they have tin and lead; which with skins they barter with the merchants for earthenware, salt, and brazen vessels. Formerly the Phoenicians alone carried on this traffic from Gades, concealing the passage from every one; and when the Romans followed a certain ship-master, that they also might find the market, the shipmaster of jealousy purposely ran his vessel upon a shoal, leading on those who followed him into the same destructive disaster; he himself escaped by means of a fragment of the ship, and received from the state the value of the cargo he had lost. The Romans nevertheless by frequent efforts discovered the passage, and as soon as Publius Crassus, passing over to them, perceived that the metals were dug out at a little depth, and that the men were peaceably disposed, he declared it to those who already wished to traffic in this sea for profit, although the passage was longer than that to Britain. Thus far concerning Iberia and the adjacent islands.

== Ancient geography ==
Herodotus (430 BC) had only vaguely heard of the Cassiterides, "from which we are said to have our tin", but did not discount the islands as legendary. Later writers—Posidonius, Diodorus Siculus, Strabo and others—call them smallish islands off ("some way off," Strabo says) the northwest coast of the Iberian Peninsula, which contained tin mines or, according to Strabo, tin and lead mines. A passage in Diodorus derives the name rather from their nearness to the tin districts of Northwest Iberia. Ptolemy and Dionysios Periegetes mentioned them—the former as ten small islands in northwest Iberia far off the coast and arranged symbolically as a ring, and the latter in connection with the mythical Hesperides. The islands are described by Pomponius Mela as rich in lead; they are mentioned last in the same paragraph he wrote about Cádiz and the islands of Lusitania, and placed in Celtici. Following paragraphs describe the Île de Sein and Britain.

Probably written in the first century BC, the verse Circumnavigation of the World, whose anonymous author is called the "Pseudo-Scymnus," places two tin islands in the upper part of the Adriatic Sea and mentioned the market place Osor on the island of Cres, where extraordinarily high quality tin could be bought. Pliny the Elder, on the other hand, represents the Cassiterides as fronting Celtiberia.

At a time when geographical knowledge of the West was still scanty, and when the secrets of the tin trade were still successfully guarded by the seamen of Gades (modern Cádiz) and others who dealt in the metal, the Greeks knew only that tin came to them by sea from the far West, and the idea of tin-producing islands easily arose. Later, when the West was better explored, it was found that tin actually came from two regions: Galicia, in the northwest of Iberia, and Cornwall and Devon in southwest Britain. Diodorus reports: "For there are many mines of tin in the country above Lusitania and on the islets which lie off Iberia out in the ocean and are called because of that fact the Cassiterides." According to Diodorus tin also came from Britannia to Gaul and then was brought overland to Massilia and Narbo. Neither of these could be called small islands or accurately described as off the northwest coast of Iberia, and so the Greek and Roman geographers did not identify either as the Cassiterides. Instead, they became a third, ill-understood source of tin, conceived of as distinct from Iberia or Britain.

Strabo says that a Publius Crassus was the first Roman to visit the Tin Islands and write a first-hand report. This Crassus is thought to be either the Publius Licinius Crassus who was a governor in Hispania in the 90s, or his grandson by the same name, who in 57–56 BC commanded Julius Caesar's forces in Armorica (Brittany), which places him near the mouth of the Loire river.

== Modern attempts at identification ==
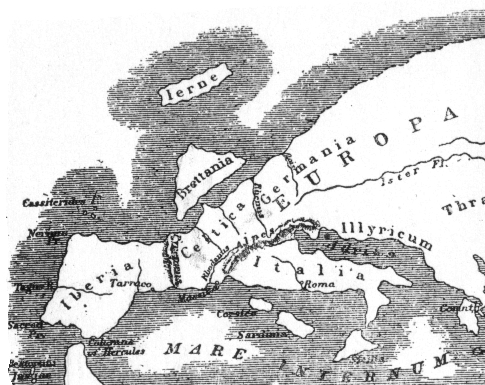
Map of Europe according to Strabo, who believed the Cassiterides to be in the Atlantic off the coast of Lusitania but before the British Isles.

Modern writers have made many attempts to identify them. Small islands off the northwest coast of the Iberian Peninsula, the headlands of that same coast, the Isles of Scilly, Cornwall, and the British Isles as a whole, have all in turn been suggested, but none suits the conditions. Neither the Iberian islands nor the Isles of Scilly contain tin, at least in significant quantities. It seems most probable, therefore, that the name Cassiterides represents the first vague knowledge of the Greeks that tin was found overseas, somewhere in, off, or near Western Europe.

Gavin de Beer has suggested that Roger Dion had solved the puzzle by bringing to bear a chance remark in Avienius' late poem Ora maritima, which is based on early sources: the tin isles were in an arm of the sea within sight of wide plains and rich mines of tin and lead, and opposite two islands – a further one, Hibernia, and a nearer one, Britannia. "Before the estuary of the Loire became silted up in late Roman times, the Bay of Biscay led into a wide gulf, now represented by the lower reaches of the river Brivet and the marshes of the Brière, between Paimboeuf and St. Nazaire, in which were a number of islands. The islands and shores of this gulf, now joined together by silt, are crowded with Bronze Age foundries that worked tin and lead; Pénestin and the tin headland are just north of them; and there can be no doubt that the famous tin islands were there." De Beer confirms the location from Strabo: the Cassiterides are ten islands in the sea, north of the land of the Artabrians in the northwest corner of Hispania.

E. Thomas from the French BRGM showed in a 2004 report that tin mines were probably operated by the Romans at La Hye, near Ploërmel. This tin might have transited down the Oust river and the Vilaine river to the sea, where it could be transferred on seagoing ships, possibly at Pénestin, giving some support to de Beer's suggestion above.

== See also ==
- Tin mining in Britain
- Tin sources and trade in ancient times
