= Al-Jalama, Haifa =

Al-Jalama الجلمة
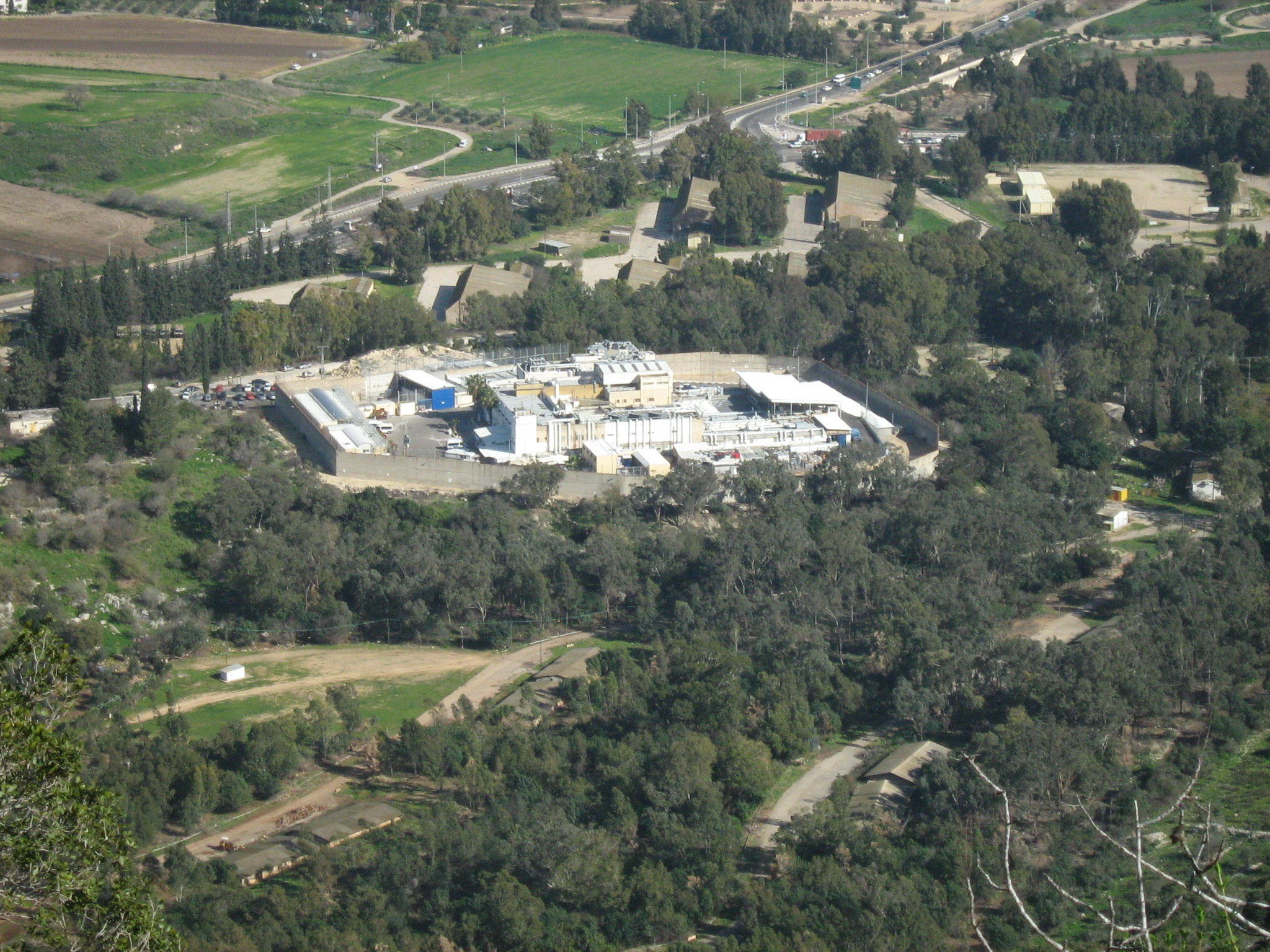
- Jalame Prison (Kishon Detention Center)
- Etymology: The hill
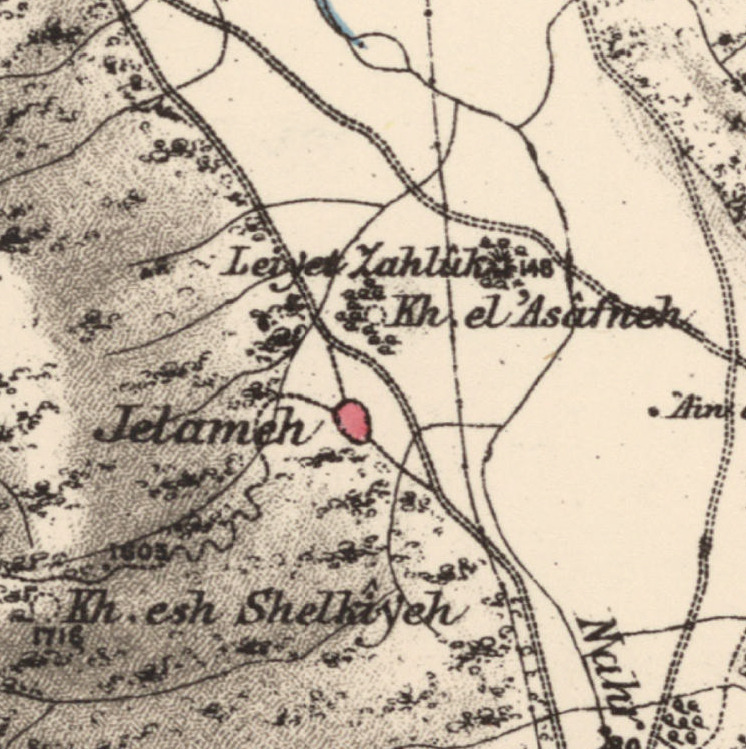
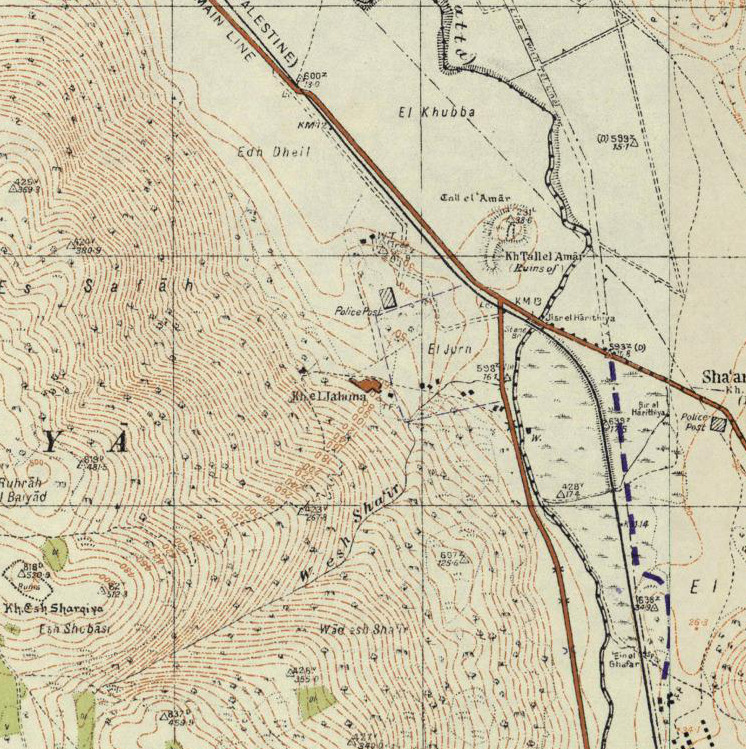
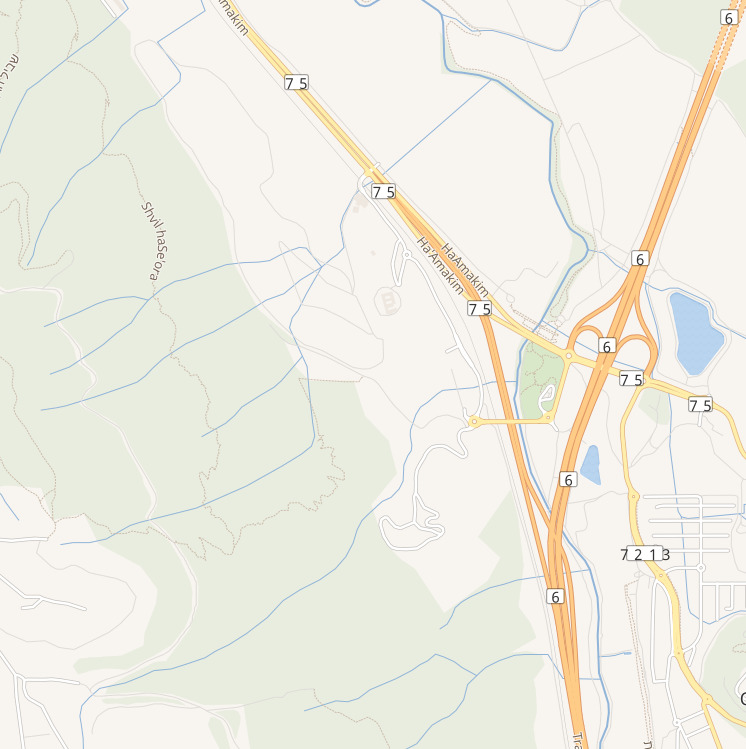
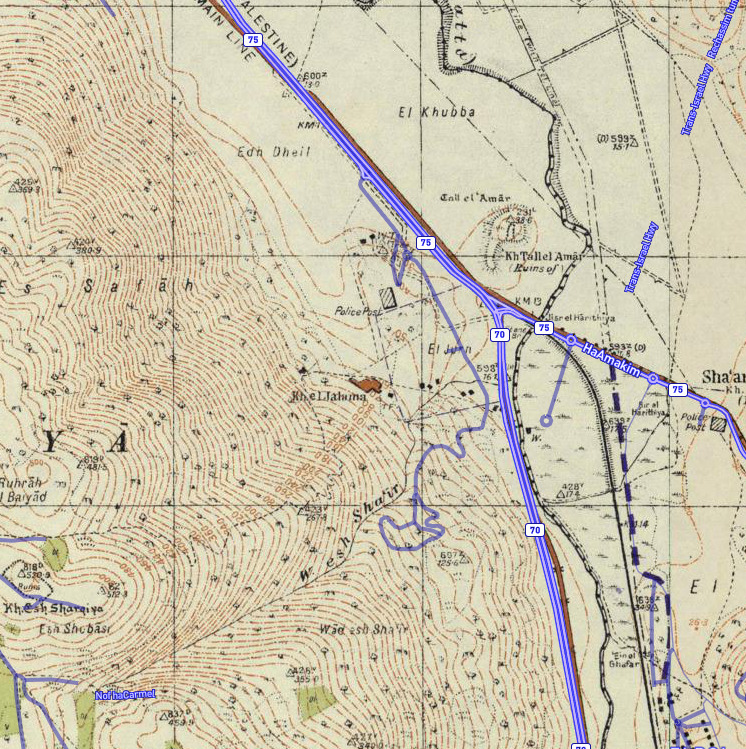
- 1870s map 1940s map modern map 1940s with modern overlay map A series of historical maps of the area around Al-Jalama, Haifa (click the buttons)

- Location within Mandatory Palestine
- Coordinates: 32°43′24″N 35°05′27″E
- Palestine grid: 158/236
- Geopolitical entity: Mandatory Palestine
- Subdistrict: Haifa

Area
  - Total: 7,713 dunams (7.713 km^{2}; 2.978 sq mi)

Al-Jalama (Arabic: الجلمة) was a Palestinian village about 14 kilometres south-east of Haifa. It was depopulated in 1948.

== History ==
The village was situated just above Khirbat Asafna. Excavations between 1964 and 1971 showed that the site had been occupied intermittently from the first to the fourth century CE.

In the British Mandate period in Palestine, the village was classified as a hamlet in the Palestine Index Gazetteer. In the 1931 census of Palestine, Al-Jalama was counted under Isfiya.

In the 1930’s the British mandate built the Jalama Tegart fort as a measure against the 1936–1939 Arab Revolt. In 1947 UN resolution 181 (ii) included the area in its allocation for the Jewish state, and the area was incorporated into the State of Israel after the 1948 war. The Kishon prison, also known as the Al Jalame detention centre, was later established in the fort site.

The Palestinian historian Walid Khalidi described the village site in 1992: "A military camp occupies the area, which is covered by eucalyptus trees."

== See also ==
- Depopulated Palestinian locations in Israel

== Bibliography ==
- Berlin, A.; et al. (2004). Testament of Time: Selected Objects from the Collection of Palestinian Antiquities. Rosemont Publishing. ISBN 0-8386-3975-5.
- Brill, R. (1988). "8". Scientific Investigations of the Jalame Glass and Related Finds (PDF). Missouri press. Archived from the original (PDF) on 2015-06-16.
- Khalidi, W. (1992). All That Remains: The Palestinian Villages Occupied and Depopulated by Israel in 1948. Washington D.C.: Institute for Palestine Studies. ISBN 0-88728-224-5.
- Mills, E., ed. (1932). Census of Palestine 1931. Population of Villages, Towns and Administrative Areas. Jerusalem: Government of Palestine.
- Palmer, E.H. (1881). The Survey of Western Palestine: Arabic and English Name Lists Collected During the Survey by Lieutenants Conder and Kitchener, R. E. Transliterated and Explained by E.H. Palmer. Committee of the Palestine Exploration Fund.
- Weinberg, Gladys Davidson (1988). Excavations at Jalame: Site of a Glass Factory in Late Roman Palestine. Missouri press. ISBN 9780826204097.
