= Tin mining in Britain =

Economic activity

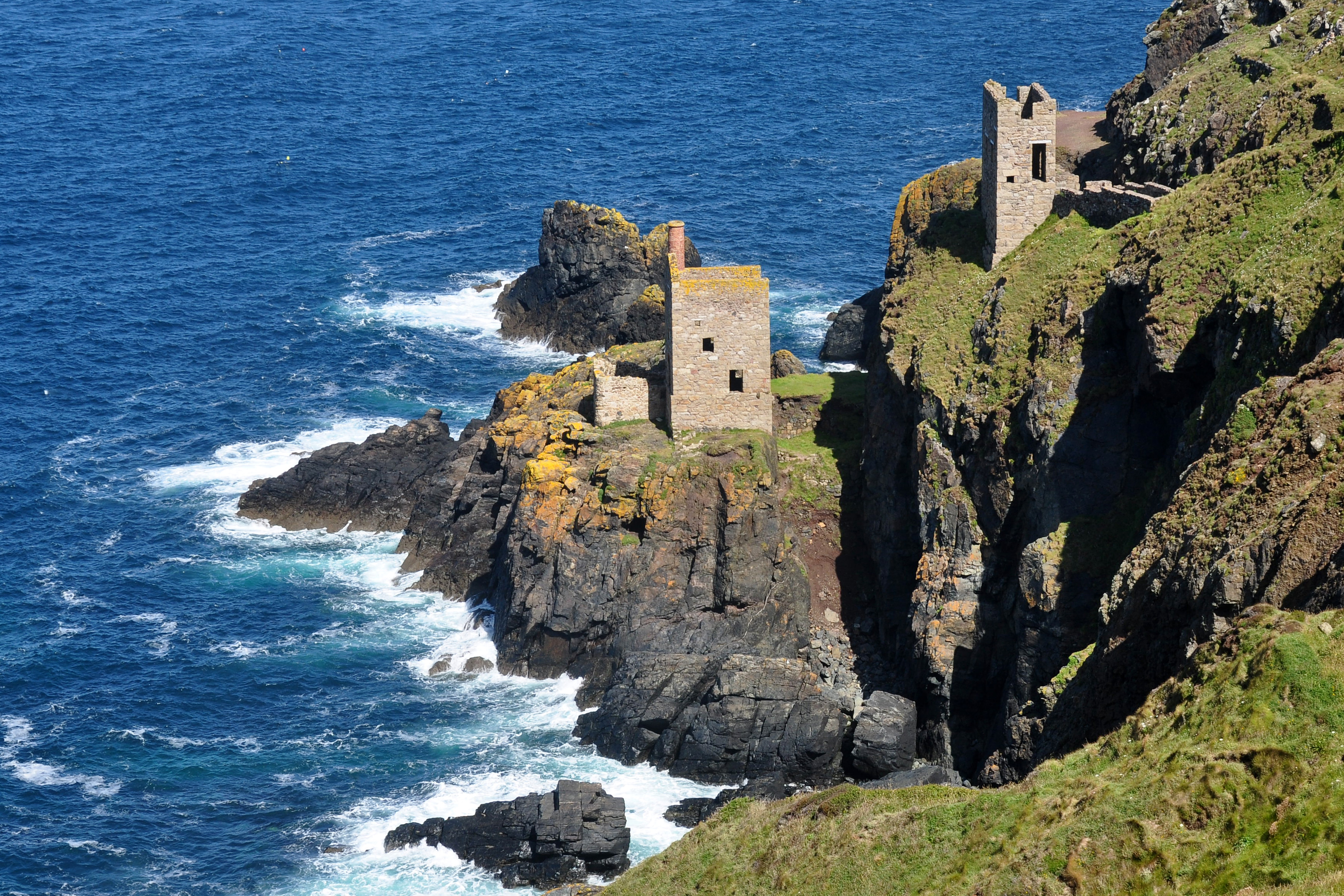
The ruined engine houses of Botallack Mine, Cornwall

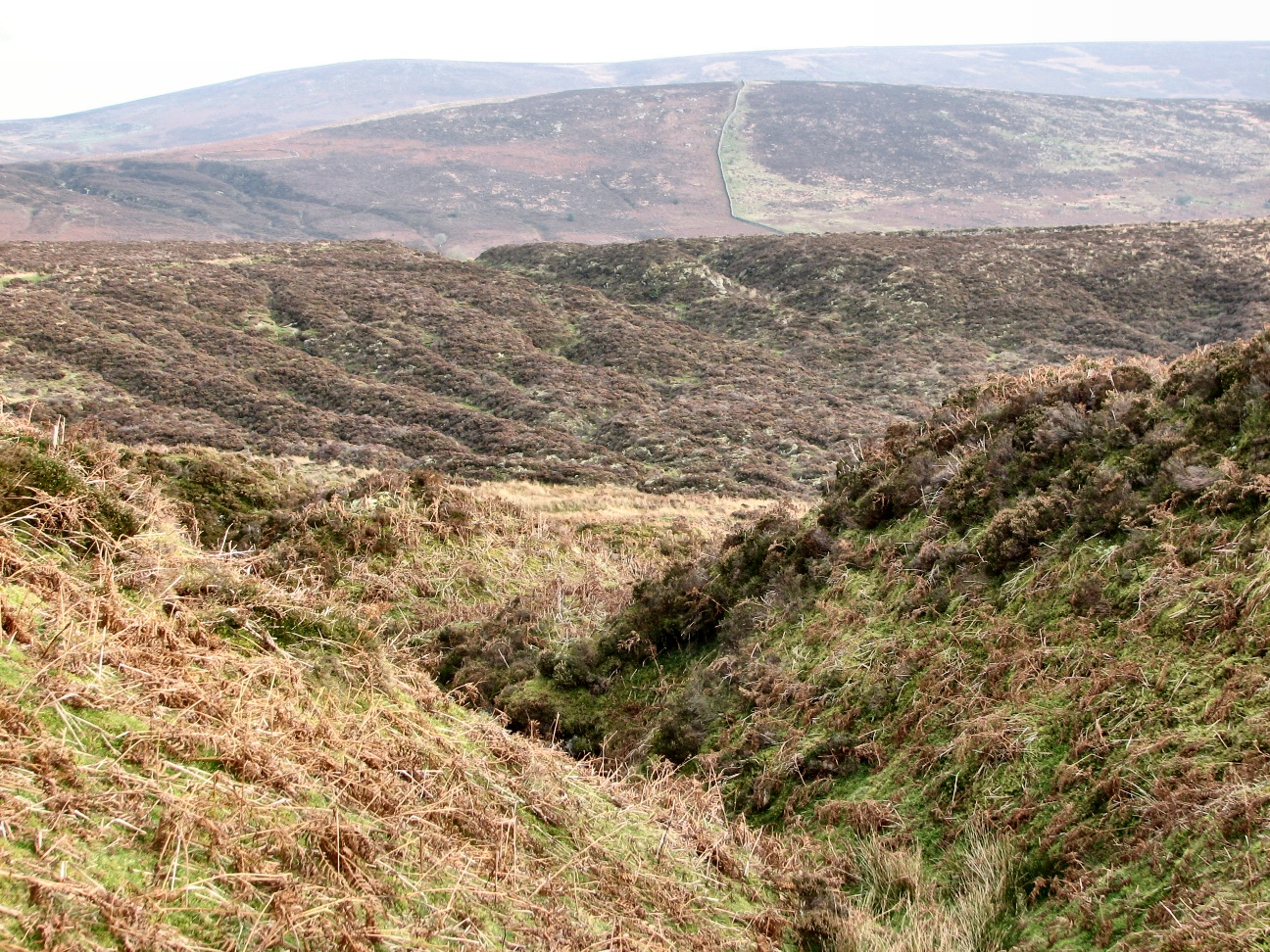
Tinners' gullies near the Warren House Inn, Dartmoor

Tin mining in Britain took place from prehistoric times, during Bronze Age Britain, until the 20th century. Mention of tin mining in Britain was made by many Classical writers. Tin is necessary to smelt bronze, an alloy that played a vital cultural role during the Bronze Age. As South-West Britain was one of the few parts of Anglian stage England to escape glaciation, tin ore was readily available on the surface. Originally it is likely that cassiterite alluvial deposits in the gravels of streams were exploited but later underground working took place. Shallow cuttings were then used to extract ore. In the 19th century advances in mining engineering enabled the exploitation of much deeper mines. In a few cases these mines even extended both to multiple levels and workings below the seabed.

== See also ==
- Tin sources and trade during antiquity
- Dartmoor tin mining
- Mining in Cornwall and Devon
