= Beno Rothenberg =

Israeli archaeologist and photographer (1914–2012)

- בנו רותנברג
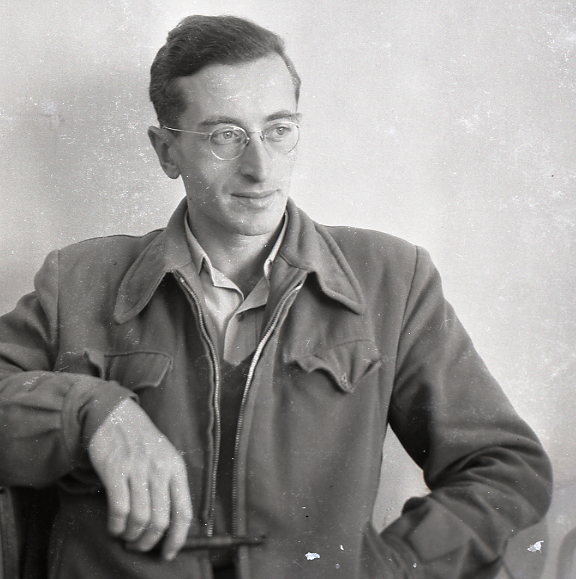
- Rothenberg in 1949
- Born: October 23, 1914; Frankfurt, German Empire
- Died: March 13, 2012 (aged 97); Ramat Gan, Israel
- Education: Hebrew University of Jerusalem, University of Frankfurt
- Occupations: Archaeologist, photographer and one of the founders of archaeometallurgy.

Beno Rothenberg (Hebrew: בנו רותנברג; October 23, 1914, in Frankfurt am Main – March 13, 2012, in Ramat Gan, Israel) was an Israeli photographer, archaeologist, and one of the founders of archaeometallurgy.

== Biography ==
Beno Rothenberg was born in a wealthy Hassidic Jewish family in Frankfurt am Main on October 23, 1914. He emigrated to Palestine with his family in 1933, where he started right away his studies of mathematics and philosophy at the Hebrew University of Jerusalem.

Three years after his arrival in Palestine, he joined the Hagana. During the Second World War he served with the Royal Air Force Meteorological Service in Egypt.

In 1945 he bought a camera, taught himself photography, and became a press photographer. During the 1948 War of Independence, he was assigned as a photographer to an armed brigade under Yitzhak Sadeh.

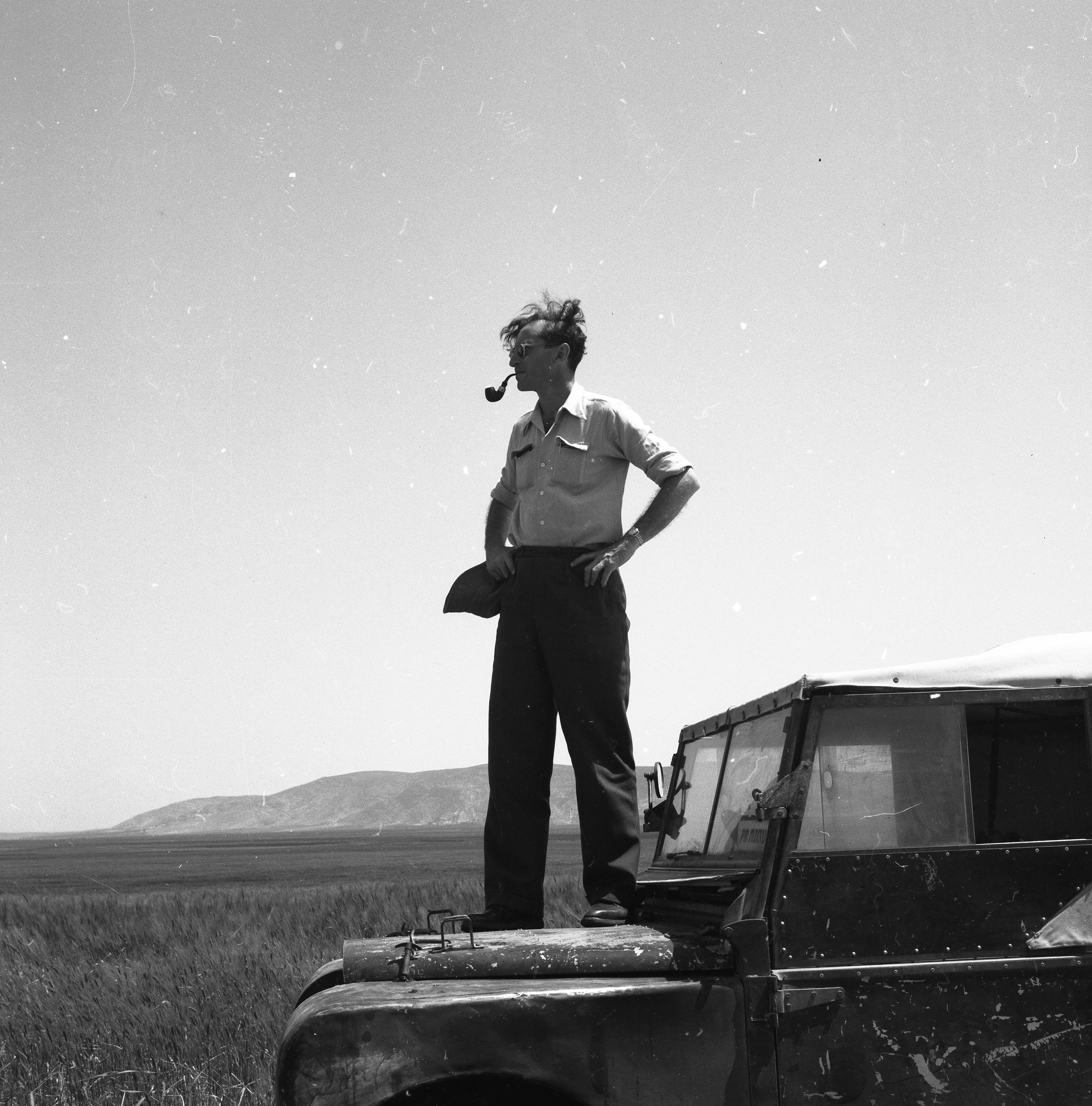
Rothenberg in 1955

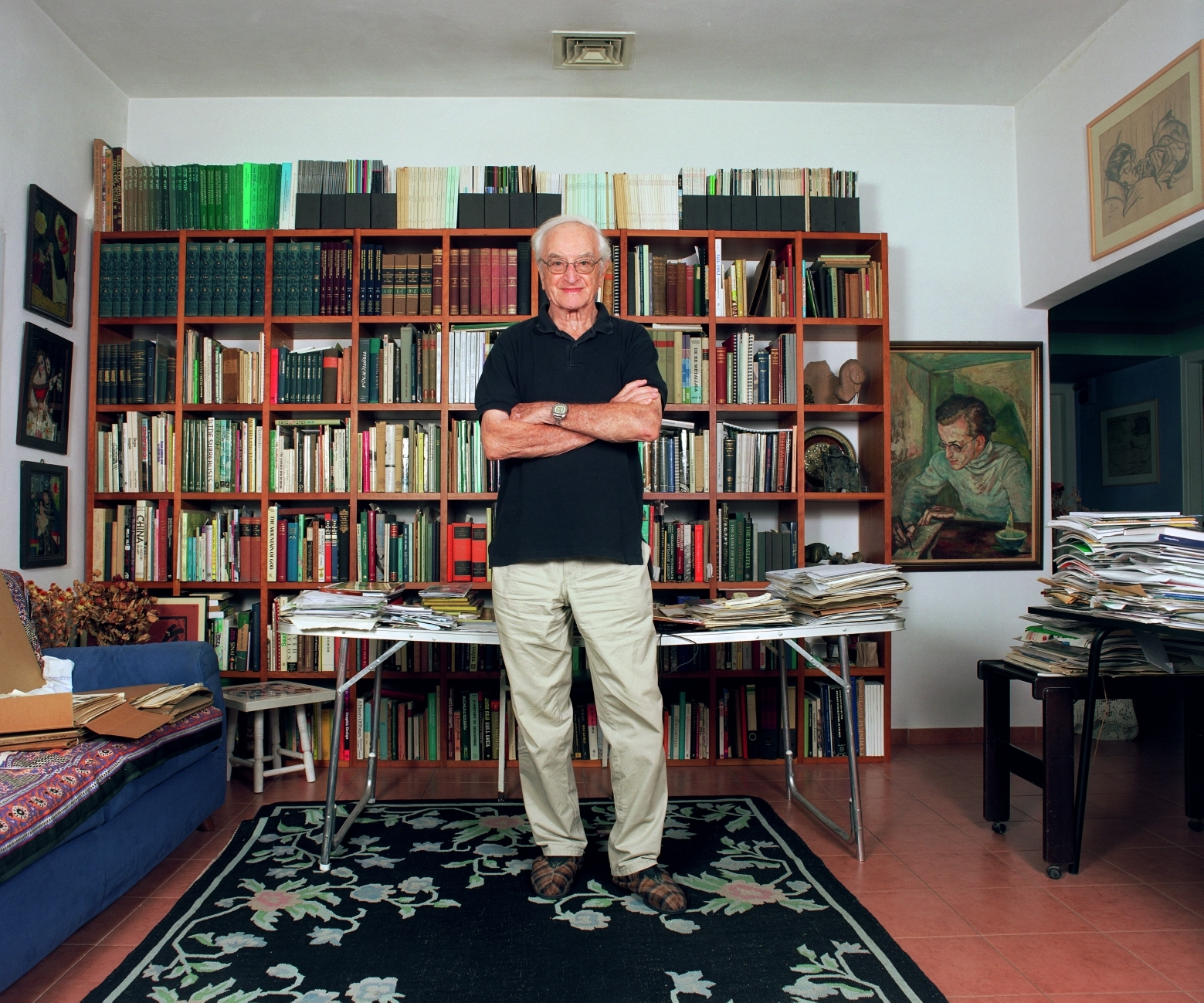
Rothenberg in 2004

In 1952 he became a photographer for the archaeological survey of the Negev desert. For the next several decades, he documented archaeological work in Israel, while also resuming his studies at the University of Frankfurt, where he received his PhD in 1961.

His photography led him to work with American archaeologist Nelson Glueck in the 1950s surveying biblical sites for King Solomon's mines. He became an expedition supervisor and an administrator of the field team. His first major work was a survey of the Sinai Peninsula in 1956. He later worked with Yohanan Aharoni, whose scientific approach influenced Rothenberg and created frictions with Glueck, who was more inclined towards biblical literalism. Rothenberg went on to lead excavations uncovering the expansive Egyptian-controlled ancient copper mines at Timna Valley, part of the Arava Valley in the Negev Desert. The Arava Expedition he headed found a "vast ancient industrial landscape around" there as well as a temple dedicated to the Egyptian goddess Hathor from the 14th-12th centuries BCE, which together overthrew the prevailing view of the mines being founded by King Solomon of biblical fame. The major Arava Expedition was followed in 1956 and later in 1967-78 by a survey of the Sinai Peninsula, which fundamentally changed what was known about that region.

In 1968, Rothenberg joined American Theodore Wertime, "on a long reconnaissance journey through Turkey, Iran and Afghanistan in search of the origins of pyrotechnology".

Though he worked for many years in the Tel Aviv University, he did not get a permanent position there, and in 1973, Rothenberg together with Mortimer Wheeler founded the Institute for Archaeo-Metallurgical Studies at the University College London to support his work. He partnered with academic institutions in the UK and Germany, establishing archaeometallurgy as an academic field.

Rothenberg trained many students who became leaders in archaeometallurgy. He lectured into his nineties, and gave his last lecture in 2008, at 94.

Rothenberg died in Ramat Gan at the age of 97, on March 13, 2012.

== Assessment and legacy ==
Rothenberg took about 32,000 photos from 1947 to 1957. They are now preserved in the Meitar Collection at the National Library of Israel.

Rothenberg is considered as one of the important photographers of life in the years leading up to the founding of the State of Israel and its early years. He had access to important Israeli personalities of whom he took portraits. His illustrated books were very popular. Rothenberg also published a number of philosophy articles, along with a book of poetry.

== Publications ==
- Rothenberg, Beno (1961). God's Wilderness: Discoveries in Sinai. Thames and Hudson.
- Rothenberg, Beno (1972). Timna; Valley of the Biblical Copper Mines. Thames and Hudson. ISBN 978-0-500-39010-8.
- Rothenberg, Beno (1972). Were These King Solomon's Mines?: Excavations in the Timna Valley. Stein and Day. ISBN 978-0-8128-1506-1.
- Rothenberg, Beno; Weyer, Helfried (1979). Sinai: Pharaohs, Miners, Pilgrims, and Soldiers. Binns. ISBN 978-0896740020.
- Rothenberg, Beno (1988). The Egyptian Mining Temple at Timna. Institute for Archaeo-Metallurgical Studies [and] Institute of Archaeology, University College, London. ISBN 978-0-906183-02-1.
- Levene, Dan; Rothenberg, Beno (2007). A Metallurgical Gemara: Metals in the Jewish Sources. Institute for Archaeo-Metallurgical Studies, Institute of Archaeology, University College. ISBN 978-0-906183-04-5.
