= Tin sources and trade during antiquity =

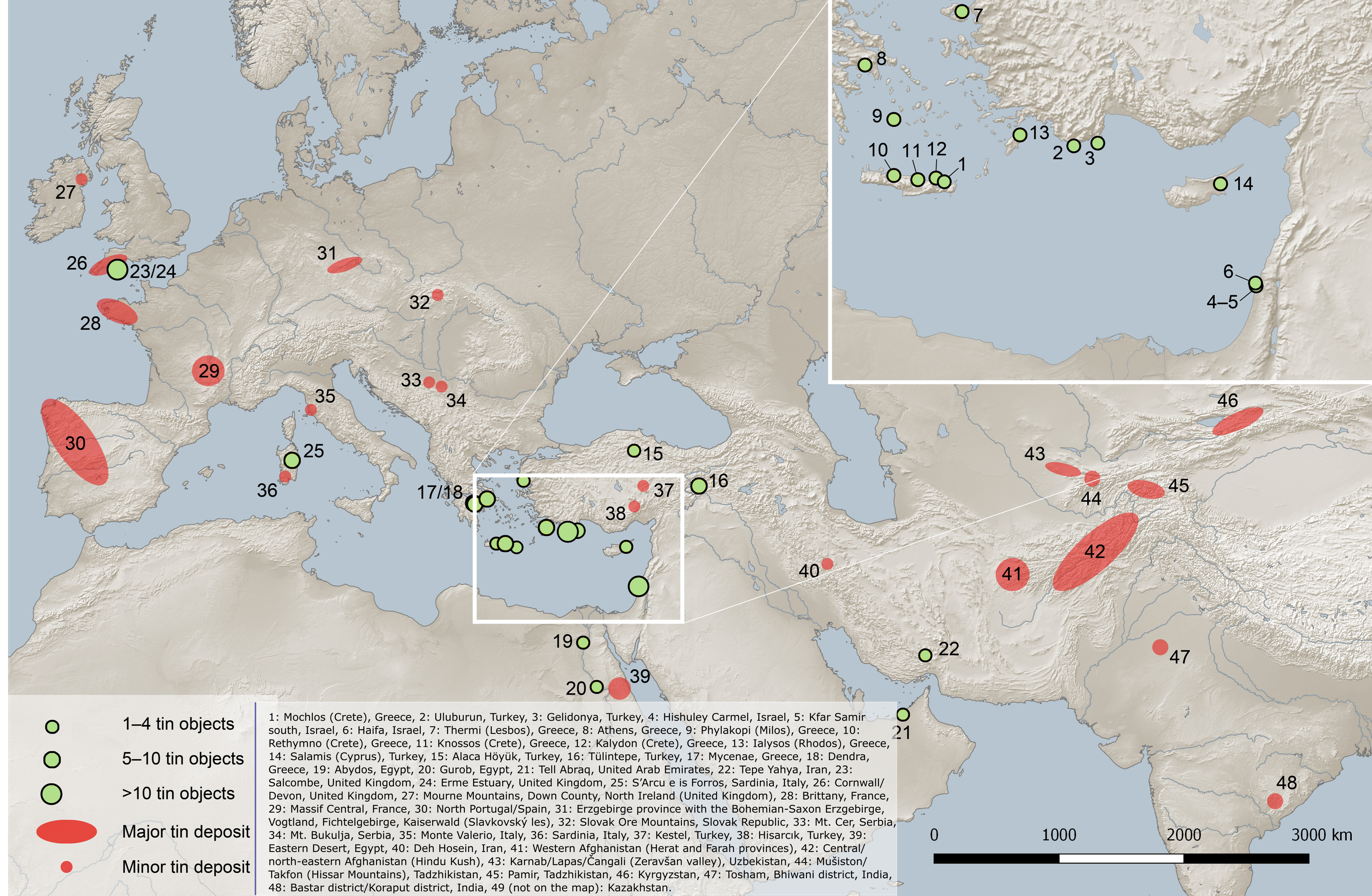
Map of bronze-age tin finds: major and minor tin deposits from Europe to Central Asia, and selected objects.

Tin is an essential metal in the creation of tin-bronzes, and its acquisition was an important part of ancient cultures from the Bronze Age onward. Its use began in the Middle East and the Balkans around 3000 BC. Tin is a relatively rare element in the Earth's crust, with about two parts per million (ppm), compared to iron with 50,000 ppm, copper with 70 ppm, lead with 16 ppm, arsenic with 5 ppm, silver with 0.1 ppm, and gold with 0.005 ppm. Ancient sources of tin were therefore rare, and the metal usually had to be traded over very long distances to meet demand in areas that lacked tin deposits.

Known sources of tin in ancient times include the southeastern tin belt that runs from Yunnan in China to the Malay Peninsula; Afghanistan; Cornwall and Devon in Britain; Brittany in France; the border between Germany and the Czech Republic; Spain; Portugal; Italy; and central and South Africa. Syria and Egypt have been suggested as minor sources of tin, but the archaeological evidence is inconclusive.

== Early use ==
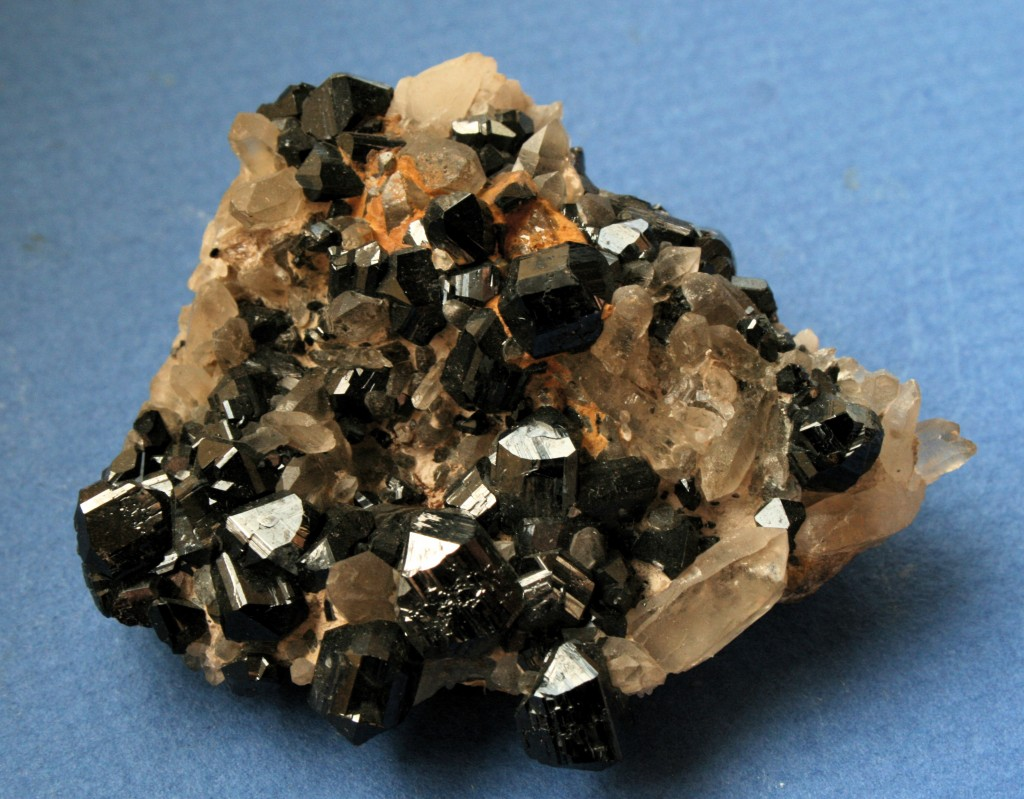
Cassiterite and quartz crystals

Tin extraction and use can be dated to the beginning of the Bronze Age around 3000 BC, during which copper objects were formed from polymetallic ores which had different physical properties. The earliest bronze objects had tin or arsenic content of less than 2% and are therefore believed to be the result of unintentional alloying due to trace metal content in copper ores such as tennantite, which contains arsenic. The addition of a second metal to copper increases its hardness, lowers the melting temperature, and improves the casting process by producing a more fluid melt that cools to a denser, less spongy metal. This was an important innovation that allowed for the much more complex shapes cast in closed molds of the Bronze Age. Arsenical bronze objects appear first in the Middle East where arsenic is commonly found in association with copper ore, but the health risks were quickly realized and the quest for sources of the much less hazardous tin ores began early in the Bronze Age. This created the demand for rare tin metal and formed a trade network that linked the distant sources of tin to the markets of Bronze Age cultures.

Cassiterite (SnO_{2}), oxidized tin, most likely was the original source of tin in ancient times. Other forms of tin ores are less abundant sulfides such as stannite that require a more involved smelting process. Cassiterite often accumulates in alluvial channels as placer deposits due to the fact that it is harder, heavier, and more chemically resistant than the granite in which it typically forms. These deposits can be easily seen in river banks, because cassiterite is usually black or purple or otherwise dark, a feature exploited by early Bronze Age prospectors. It is likely that the earliest deposits were alluvial and perhaps exploited by the same methods used for panning gold in placer deposits.

== Archaeological importance ==
The importance of tin to the success of Bronze Age cultures and the scarcity of the resource offers a glimpse into that time period's trade and cultural interactions, and has therefore been the focus of intense archaeological studies. However, a number of problems have plagued the study of ancient tin such as the limited archaeological remains of placer mining, the destruction of ancient mines by modern mining operations, and the poor preservation of pure tin objects due to tin disease or tin pest. These problems are compounded by the difficulty in provenancing tin objects and ores to their geological deposits using isotopic or trace element analyses. Current archaeological debate is concerned with the origins of tin in the earliest Bronze Age cultures of the Near East.

== Ancient sources ==
=== Europe ===
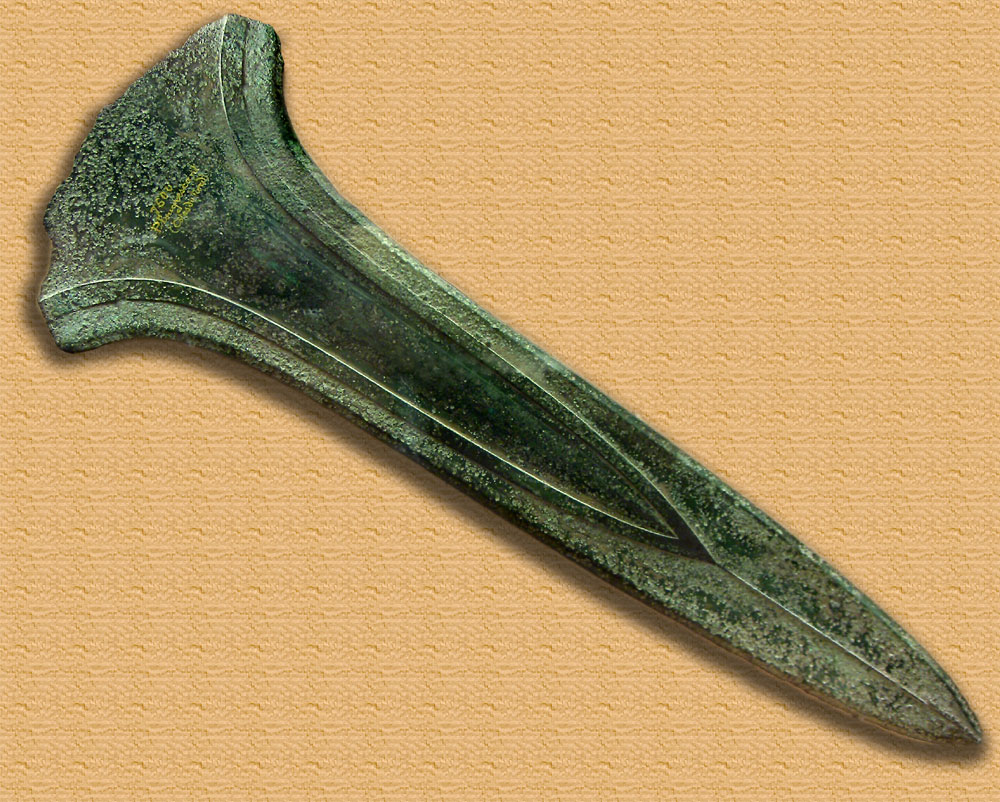
Giant, ceremonial dirk of the Plougrescant-Ommerschans type, Plougrescant, France, 1500–1300 BC.

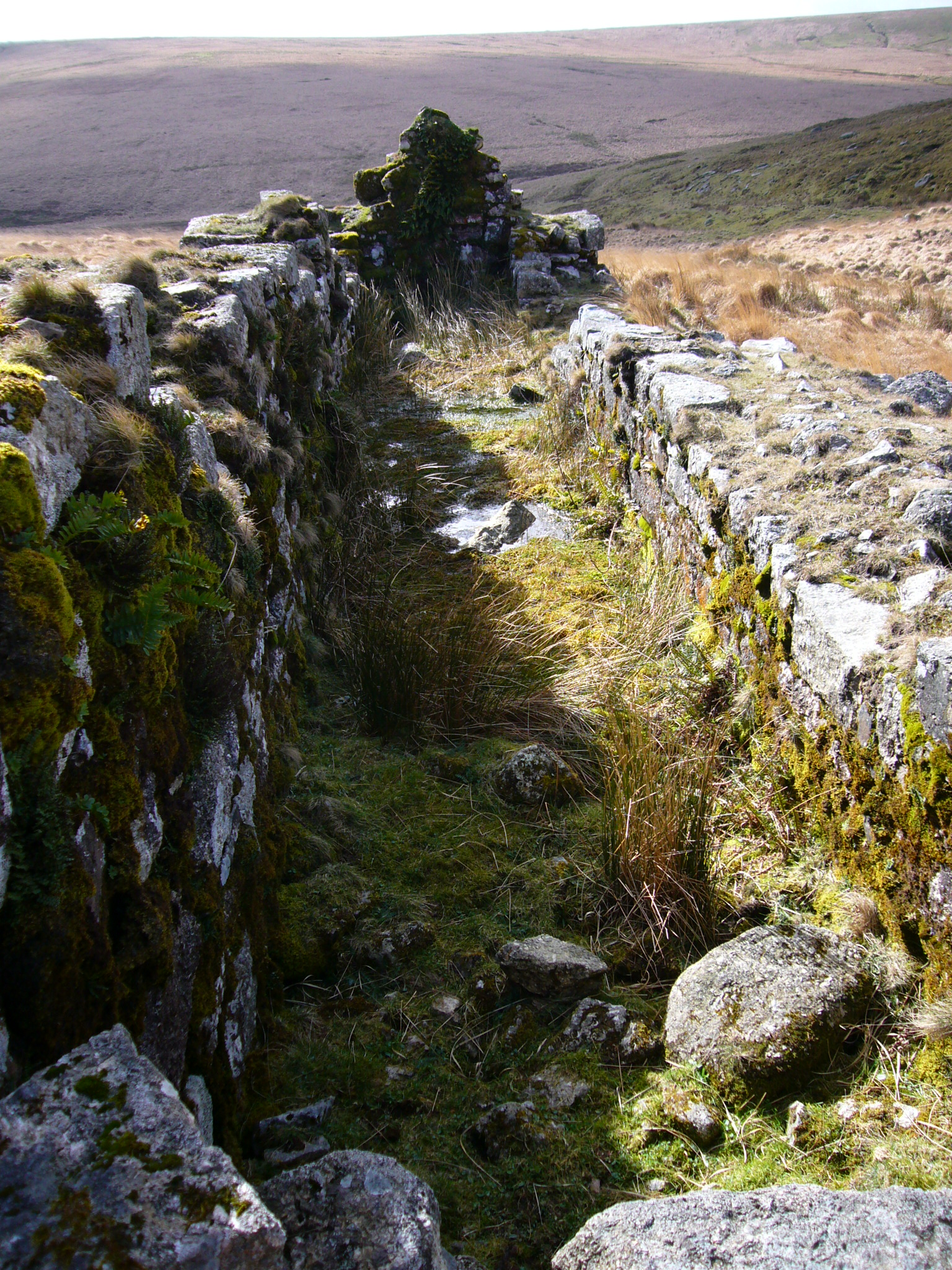
Wheelpit at a medieval tin mine in Dartmoor, United Kingdom

Europe has very few sources of tin. Therefore, throughout ancient times it was imported long distances from the known tin mining districts of antiquity. These were the Ore Mountains (Erzgebirge) along the modern border between Germany and the Czech Republic, the Iberian Peninsula, Brittany in modern France, and Cornwall and Devon in southwestern Britain. There are several smaller sources of tin in the Balkans and another minor source of tin is known to exist at Monte Valerio in Tuscany, Italy. The Tuscan source was exploited by Etruscan miners around 800 BC, but it was not a significant source of tin for the rest of the Mediterranean. Even at that time, the Etruscans themselves had to import additional tin from the northwest of the Iberian Peninsula, and later from Cornwall.

It has been claimed that tin was first mined in Europe around 2500 BC in the Erzgebirge, and knowledge of tin bronze and tin extraction techniques spread from there to Brittany and Cornwall around 2000 BC and from northwestern Europe to northwestern Spain and Portugal around the same time. However, the only Bronze Age object from Central Europe whose tin has been scientifically provenanced is the Nebra sky disk, and its tin (and gold, though not its copper), is shown by tin isotopes to have come from Cornwall. In addition, a rare find of a pure tin ingot in Scandinavia was provenanced to Cornwall. Available evidence, though very limited, thus points to Cornwall as the sole early source of tin in Central and Northern Europe.

Cornwall and Devon were important sources of tin for Europe and the Mediterranean throughout ancient times and may have been the earliest sources of tin in Western Europe, with evidence for trade to the Eastern Mediterranean by the Late Bronze Age. Within recorded history, Cornwall and Devon only dominated the European market for tin from late Roman times, starting around the 3rd century AD, as many Spanish tin mines were exhausted. Cornwall maintained its importance as a source of tin throughout medieval times and into the modern period.

Brittany – opposite Cornwall on the Celtic Sea – has significant sources of tin which show evidence of being extensively exploited after the Roman conquest of Gaul during the 50s BC and onwards. Brittany remained a significant source of tin throughout the medieval period.

A group of 52 bronze artifacts from the late Bronze Age Balkans has been shown to have tin of multiple origins, based on the correlation of tin isotope differences with the different find locations of the artifacts. While the locations of these separate tin sources are uncertain, the larger Serbian group of artifacts is inferred to be derived from tin sources in western Serbia (e.g. Mount Cer), while the smaller group, largely from western Romania, is inferred to have western Romanian origins.

Iberian tin was widely traded across the Mediterranean during the Bronze Age, and extensively exploited during Roman times. But Iberian tin deposits were largely forgotten throughout the medieval period, were not rediscovered until the 18th century, and only re-gained importance during the mid-19th century.

=== Asia ===
Western Asia has very little tin ore; the few sources that have recently been found are too insignificant to have played a major role during most of ancient history. However, it is possible that they were exploited at the start of the Bronze Age and are responsible for the development of early bronze manufacturing technology. Kestel, in Southern Turkey, is the site of an ancient cassiterite mine that was used from 3250 to 1800 BC. It contains miles of tunnels, some only large enough for a child. A grave with children who were probably workers has been found. It was abandoned, with crucibles and other tools left at the site.

While there are a few sources of cassiterite in Central Asia, namely in Uzbekistan, Tajikistan, and Afghanistan, that show signs of having been exploited starting around 2000 BC, archaeologists disagree about whether they were significant sources of tin for the earliest Bronze Age cultures of the Middle East.

In Northern Asia the only tin deposits considered exploitable by ancient peoples occur in the far eastern region of Siberia. This source of tin appears to have been exploited by the Eurasian Steppe people known as the Seima-Turbino culture around 2000 BC as well as by northern Chinese cultures around the same time.

Eastern Asia has a number of small cassiterite deposits along the Yellow River which were exploited by the earliest Chinese Bronze Age culture of Erlitou and the Shang dynasty (2500 to 1800 BC). However, the richest deposits for the region, and indeed the world, lie in Southeastern Asia, stretching from Yunnan in China to the Malay Peninsula. The deposits in Yunnan were not mined until around 700 BC, but by the Han dynasty had become the main source of tin in China according to historical texts of the Han, Jin, Tang, and Song dynasties. Other cultures of Southeast Asia exploited the abundant cassiterite resources sometime between the third and second millennia BC, but due to the lack of archaeological work in the region little else is known about tin exploitation during ancient times in that part of the world.

Tin was used in the Indian subcontinent starting between 1500 and 1000 BC. While India does have some small scattered deposits of tin, they were not a major source of tin for Indian Bronze Age cultures as shown by their dependence on imported tin.

=== Africa ===
While rich veins of tin are known to exist in Central and South Africa, whether these were exploited during ancient times is still debated (Dayton 2003, p. 165). However, the Bantu culture of Zimbabwe are known to have actively mined, smelted and traded tin between the 11th and 15th centuries AD.

=== Americas ===
Tin deposits exist in many parts of South America, with minor deposits in southern Peru, Colombia, Brazil, and northwestern Argentina, and major deposits of exploitable cassiterite in northern Bolivia. These deposits were exploited as early as 1000 AD in the manufacture of tin bronze by Andean cultures, including the later Inca Empire, which considered tin bronze the "imperial alloy". In North America, the only known exploitable source of tin during ancient times is located in the Zacatecas tin province of north central Mexico which supplied west Mexican cultures with enough tin for bronze production.

=== Australia ===
The tin belt of Southeast Asia extends all the way down to Tasmania, but metals were not exploited in Australia until the arrival of Europeans in the 1780s.

== Trade ==
Due to the scattered nature of tin deposits around the world and its essential nature for the creation of tin bronze, tin trade played an important role in the development of cultures throughout ancient times. Archaeologists have reconstructed parts of the extensive trade networks of ancient cultures from the Bronze Age to modern times using historical texts, archaeological excavations, and trace element and lead isotope analysis to determine the origins of tin objects around the world.

=== Mediterranean ===
The earliest sources of tin in the Early Bronze Age in the Near East are still unknown and the subject of much debate in archaeology. Possibilities include minor now-depleted sources in the Near East, trade from Central Asia, Sub-Saharan Africa, Europe, or elsewhere.

It is possible that as early as 2500 BC, the Ore Mountains had begun exporting tin, using the well established Baltic amber trade route to supply Scandinavia as well as the Mediterranean with tin. By 2000 BC, the extraction of tin in Britain, France, Spain, and Portugal had begun and tin was traded to the Mediterranean sporadically from all these sources. Evidence of tin trade in the Mediterranean can be seen in a number of Bronze Age shipwrecks containing tin ingots such as the Uluburun off the coast of Turkey dated 1300 BC which carried over 300 copper bars weighing 10 tons, and approximately 40 tin bars weighing 1 ton. Evidence of direct tin trade between Europe and the Eastern Mediterranean has been demonstrated through the analysis of tin ingots dated to the 13th-12th centuries BC from sites in Israel, Turkey and modern-day Greece; tin ingots from Israel, for example, have been found to share chemical composition with tin from Cornwall and Devon (Great Britain).

While Sardinia does not appear to have much in terms of significant sources of tin, it does have rich copper and other mineral wealth and served as a centre for metals trade during the Bronze Age and likely actively imported tin from the Iberian Peninsula for export to the rest of the Mediterranean.

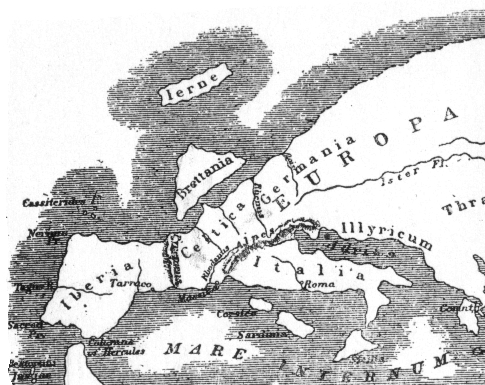
Map of Europe based on Strabo's geography, showing the Cassiterides just off the northwest tip of Iberia

By classical Greek times, the tin sources were well established. Greece and the Western Mediterranean appear to have traded their tin from European sources, while the Middle East acquired their tin from Central Asian sources through the Silk Road. For example, Iron Age Greece had access to tin from Iberia by way of the Phoenicians who traded extensively there, from the Erzgebirge by way of the Baltic Amber Road overland route, or from Brittany and Cornwall through overland routes from their colony at Massalia (modern day Marseille) established in the 6th century BC. In 450 BC, Herodotus described tin as coming from Northern European islands named the Cassiterides along the extreme borders of the world, suggesting very long-distance trade, likely from Britain, northwestern Iberia, or Brittany, supplying tin to Greece and other Mediterranean cultures. The idea that the Phoenicians went to Cornwall for its tin and supplied it to the whole of the Mediterranean has no archaeological basis and is largely considered a myth.

The early Roman world was mainly supplied with tin from its Iberian provinces of Gallaecia and Lusitania and to a lesser extent Tuscany. Pliny mentions that in 80 BC, a senatorial decree halted all mining on the Italian Peninsula, stopping any tin mining activity in Tuscany and increasing Roman dependence on tin from Brittany, Iberia, and Cornwall. After the Roman conquest of Gaul, Brittany's tin deposits saw intensified exploitation after the first century BC. With the exhaustion of the Iberian tin mines, Cornwall became a major supplier of tin for the Romans after the 3rd century AD.

Throughout the medieval period, demand for tin increased as pewter gained popularity. Brittany and Cornwall remained the major producers and exporters of tin throughout the Mediterranean through to modern times.

=== Asia ===
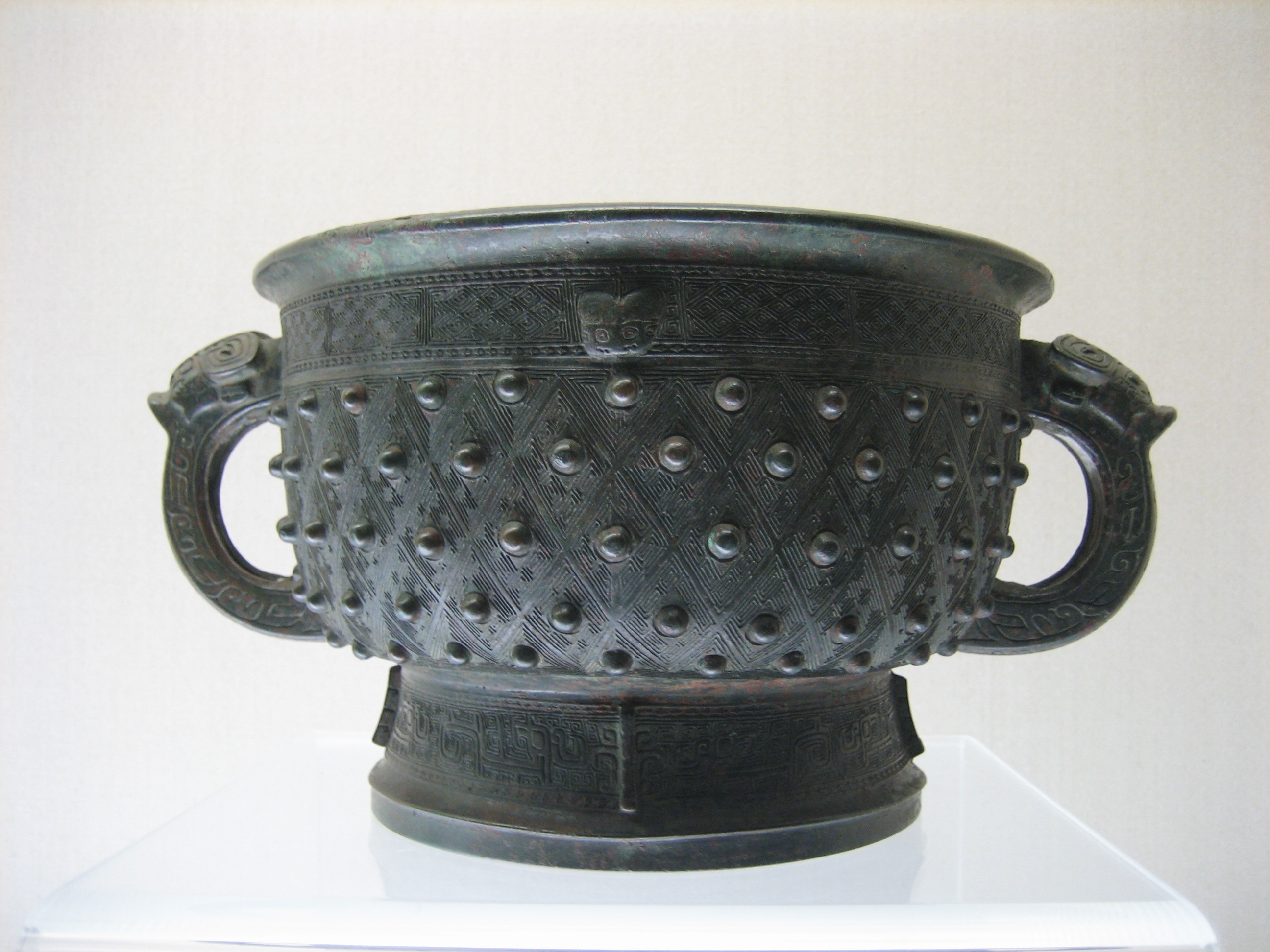
A Shang dynasty bronze gefuding gui vessel

Near Eastern development of bronze technology spread across Central Asia by way of the Eurasian Steppes, and with it came the knowledge and technology for tin prospection and extraction. By 2000 to 1500 BC Uzbekistan, Afghanistan, and Tajikistan appear to have exploited their sources of tin, carrying the resources east and west along the Silk Road crossing Central Asia. This trade link likely followed an existing trade route of lapis lazuli, a highly prized semi-precious blue gemstone, and chlorite vessels decorated with turquoise from Central Asia that have been found as far west as Egypt and that date to the same period.

In China, early tin was extracted along the Yellow River in Erlitou and Shang times between 2500 and 1800 BC. By Han and later times, China imported its tin from what is today Yunnan province. This has remained China's main source of tin throughout history and into modern times.

It is unlikely that Southeast Asian tin from Indochina was widely traded around the world in ancient times as the area was only opened up to Indian, Muslim, and European traders around 800 AD.

Indo–Roman trade relations are well known from historical texts such as Pliny's Natural History (book VI, 26), and tin is mentioned as one of the resources being exported from Rome to South Arabia, Somaliland, and India.

== See also ==
- Cassiterides
- Stannary
- Tin pest
- Tin mining in Britain
- Mining in Cornwall and Devon
- Dartmoor tin mining

== Cited works ==
- Benvenuti, M.; Chiarantini, L.; Norfini, A.; Casini, A.; Guideri, S.; Tanelli, G. (2003), "The "Etruscan tin": a preliminary contribution from researches at Monte Valerio and Baratti-Populonia (Southern Tuscany, Italy)", in Giumlia-Mair, A.; Lo Schiavo, F. (eds.), The Problem of Early Tin, Oxford: Archaeopress, pp. 55–66, ISBN 1-84171-564-6
- Chakrabarti, D.K.; Lahiri, N. (1996), Copper and its alloys in ancient India, New Delhi: Munshiram Manoharlal, ISBN 81-215-0707-3
- Charles, J.A. (1979), "The development of the usage of tin and tin-bronze: some problems", in Franklin, A.D.; Olin, J.S.; Wertime, T.A. (eds.), The Search for Ancient Tin, Washington, D.C.: A seminar organized by Theodore A. Wertime and held at the Smithsonian Institution and the National Bureau of Standards, Washington, D.C. March 14–15, 1977, pp. 25–32
- Cierny, J.; Weisgerber, G. (2003), "The "Bronze Age tin mines in Central Asia", in Giumlia-Mair, A.; Lo Schiavo, F. (eds.), The Problem of Early Tin, Oxford: Archaeopress, pp. 23–31, ISBN 1-84171-564-6
- Dayton, J.E. (1971), "The problem of tin in the ancient world", World Archaeology, vol. 3, no. 1, pp. 49–70, doi:10.1080/00438243.1971.9979491
- Dayton, J.E. (2003), "The problem of tin in the ancient world (part 2)", in Giumlia-Mair, A.; Lo Schiavo, F. (eds.), The Problem of Early Tin, Oxford: Archaeopress, pp. 165–170, ISBN 1-84171-564-6
- Gerrard, S. (2000), The Early British Tin Industry, Stroud: Tempus Publishing, ISBN 0-7524-1452-6
- Giumlia-Mair, A. (2003), "Iron Age tin in the Oriental Alps", in Giumlia-Mair, A.; Lo Schiavo, F. (eds.), The Problem of Early Tin, Oxford: Archaeopress, pp. 93–108, ISBN 1-84171-564-6
- Hauptmann, A.; Maddin, R.; Prange, M. (2002), "On the structure and composition of copper and tin ingots excavated from the shipwreck of Uluburun", Bulletin of the American School of Oriental Research, vol. 328, no. 328, American Schools of Oriental Research, pp. 1-30, JSTOR 1357777
- Haustein, M.; Gillis, C.; Pernicka, E. (2010), "Tin isotopy: a new method for solving old questions", Archaeometry, 52 (5), pp. 816-832, doi:10.1111/j.1475-4754.2010.00515.x
- Hedge, K.T.M. (1979), "Sources of ancient tin in India", in Franklin, A.D.; Olin, J.S.; Wertime, T.A. (eds.), The Search for Ancient Tin, Washington, D.C.: A seminar organized by Theodore A. Wertime and held at the Smithsonian Institution and the National Bureau of Standards, Washington D.C. March 14–15, 1977, pp. 14–15
- Kalyanaraman, S. (2010), "The Bronze Age Writing System of Sarasvati Hieroglyphics as Evidenced by Two "Rosetta Stones" - Decoding Indus script as repertoire of the mints/smithy/mine-workers of Meluhha", Journal of Indo-Judaic Studies, vol. 11, pp. 47–74
- Lechtman, H. (1996), "Arsenic bronze: dirty copper or chosen alloy? A view from the Americas", Journal of Field Archaeology, vol. 23, no. 3, pp. 477–514, doi:10.1179/009346996791973774
- Ling, Johan; Stos-Gale, Zofia; Grandin, Lena; Hjärthner-Holdar, Eva; Persson, Per-Olof (2014), "Moving metals II provenancing Scandinavian Bronze Age artefacts", Journal of Archaeological Science, 41: 106–132, doi:10.1016/j.jas.2013.07.018
- Lo Schiavo, F. (2003), "The problem of early tin from the point of view of Nuragic Sardinia", in Giumlia-Mair, A.; Lo Schiavo, F. (eds.), The Problem of Early Tin, Oxford: Archaeopress, pp. 121–132, ISBN 1-84171-564-6
- Maddin, R. (1998), Early Metallurgy: The Tin Mystery, Matsue: Proceedings of BUMA IV, pp. 1–4
- Mason, A.H; Powell, W.G.; Bankoff, H.A.; Mathur, R; Bulatović, A.; Filipović, V.; Ruiz, J. (2016), "Tin isotope characterization of bronze artifacts of the central Balkans", Journal of Archaeological Science, 69, pp. 110-117, Bibcode:2016JArSc..69..110M, doi:10.1016/j.jas.2016.04.012
- Muhly, J.D. (1973), Copper and Tin: the Distribution of Mineral Resources and the Nature of the Metals Trade in the Bronze Age, Hamden: Archon Books, ISBN 0-208-01217-6
- Muhly, J.D. (1979), "The evidence for sources of and trade in Bronze Age tin", in Franklin, A.D.; Olin, J.S.; Wertime, T.A. (eds.), The Search for Ancient Tin, Washington, D.C.: A seminar organized by Theodore A. Wertime and held at the Smithsonian Institution and the National Bureau of Standards, Washington D.C. March 14–15, 1977, pp. 43–48
- Muhly, J.D. (1985), "Sources of tin and the beginnings of bronze metallurgy", American Journal of Archaeology, vol. 89, no. 2, pp. 275–291
- Murowchick, R.E. (1991), The Ancient Bronze Metallurgy of Yunnan and its Environs: Development and Implications, Michigan: Ann Arbour
- Penhallurick, R.D. (1986), Tin in Antiquity: its Mining and Trade Throughout the Ancient World with Particular Reference to Cornwall, London: The Institute of Metals, ISBN 0-904357-81-3
- Pernicka, Ernst; Lockhoff, Nicole; Galili, Ehud; Brügmann, Gerhard; Giumlia-Mair, Alessandra R.; Soles, Jeffrey S.; Berger, Daniel (26 June 2019). "Isotope systematics and chemical composition of tin ingots from Mochlos (Crete) and other Late Bronze Age sites in the eastern Mediterranean Sea: An ultimate key to tin provenance?". PLOS ONE. 14 (6) e0218326. Bibcode:2019PLoSO..1418326B. doi:10.1371/journal.pone.0218326. ISSN 1932-6203. PMC 6594607. PMID 31242218.
- Primas, M. (2003), "The use of tin and lead in Bronze Age metallurgy", in Giumlia-Mair, A.; Lo Schiavo, F. (eds.), The Problem of Early Tin, Oxford: Archaeopress, pp. 87–92, ISBN 1-84171-564-6
- Pulak, C. (2001), "The cargo of the Uluburun ship and evidence for trade with the Aegean and beyond", in Bonfante, L.; Karageogrhis, V. (eds.), Italy and Cyprus in Antiquity: 1500–450 BC, Nicosia: The Costakis and Leto Severis Foundation, pp. 12–61, ISBN 9963-8102-3-3
- Roden, Christoph (1985). "Die montanarchäologischen Quellen des ur- und frühgeschichtlichen Zinnbergbaus in Europa - Ein Überblick". Der Anschnitt. 37 (2/3): 50–80.
- Rovia, S.; Montero, I. (2003), "Natural tin-bronze alloy in Iberian Peninsula metallurgy: potentiality and reality", in Giumlia-Mair, A.; Lo Schiavo, F. (eds.), The Problem of Early Tin, Oxford: Archaeopress, pp. 15–22, ISBN 1-84171-564-6
- Stech, T.; Pigott, V.C. (1986), "Metals trade in Southwest Asia in the third millennium BC", Iraq, vol. 48, pp. 39–64
- Valera, R.G.; Valera, P.G. (2003), "Tin in the Mediterranean area: history and geology", in Giumlia-Mair, A.; Lo Schiavo, F. (eds.), The Problem of Early Tin, Oxford: Archaeopress, pp. 3–14, ISBN 1-84171-564-6
- Weeks, L.R. (2004), Early Metallurgy of the Persian Gulf: Technology, Trade, and the Bronze Age World, Boston: Brill Academic Publishers, ISBN 0-391-04213-0
- Wertime, T.A. (1979), "The search for ancient tin: the geographic and historic boundaries", in Franklin, A.D.; Olin, J.S.; Wertime, T.A. (eds.), The Search for Ancient Tin, Washington, D.C.: A seminar organized by Theodore A. Wertime and held at the Smithsonian Institution and the National Bureau of Standards, Washington D.C. March 14–15, 1977, pp. 14–15
- Wood, J.R; Liu, Y. (2025), "Speculating on the sources of tin for the Chinese Bronze Age", Journal of World Prehistory, 38 (2), doi:10.1007/s10963-025-09199-z
