= Theodore Wertime =

American diplomat and historian (1919–1982)

- Born: Theodore Allen Wertime; August 31, 1919; Chambersburg, Pennsylvania, U.S.
- Died: April 8, 1982 (aged 62); Chambersburg, Pennsylvania, U.S.
- Education: Haverford College; American University (MA)
- Occupations: Diplomat; historian
- Employer: Smithsonian Institution
- Spouse: Bernice "Peggy"
- Children: 4

Theodore Allen Wertime (August 31, 1919 - April 8, 1982) was an American diplomat and historian.

== Early life ==
Theodore Allen Wertime was born August 31, 1919, in Chambersburg, Pennsylvania, to Flora (née Montgomery) and Rudolf Wertime. His father was professor of music at Wilson College. Wertime graduated from Haverford College in 1939, and got a Master of Arts degree in history from the American University in Washington, D.C.

== Career ==
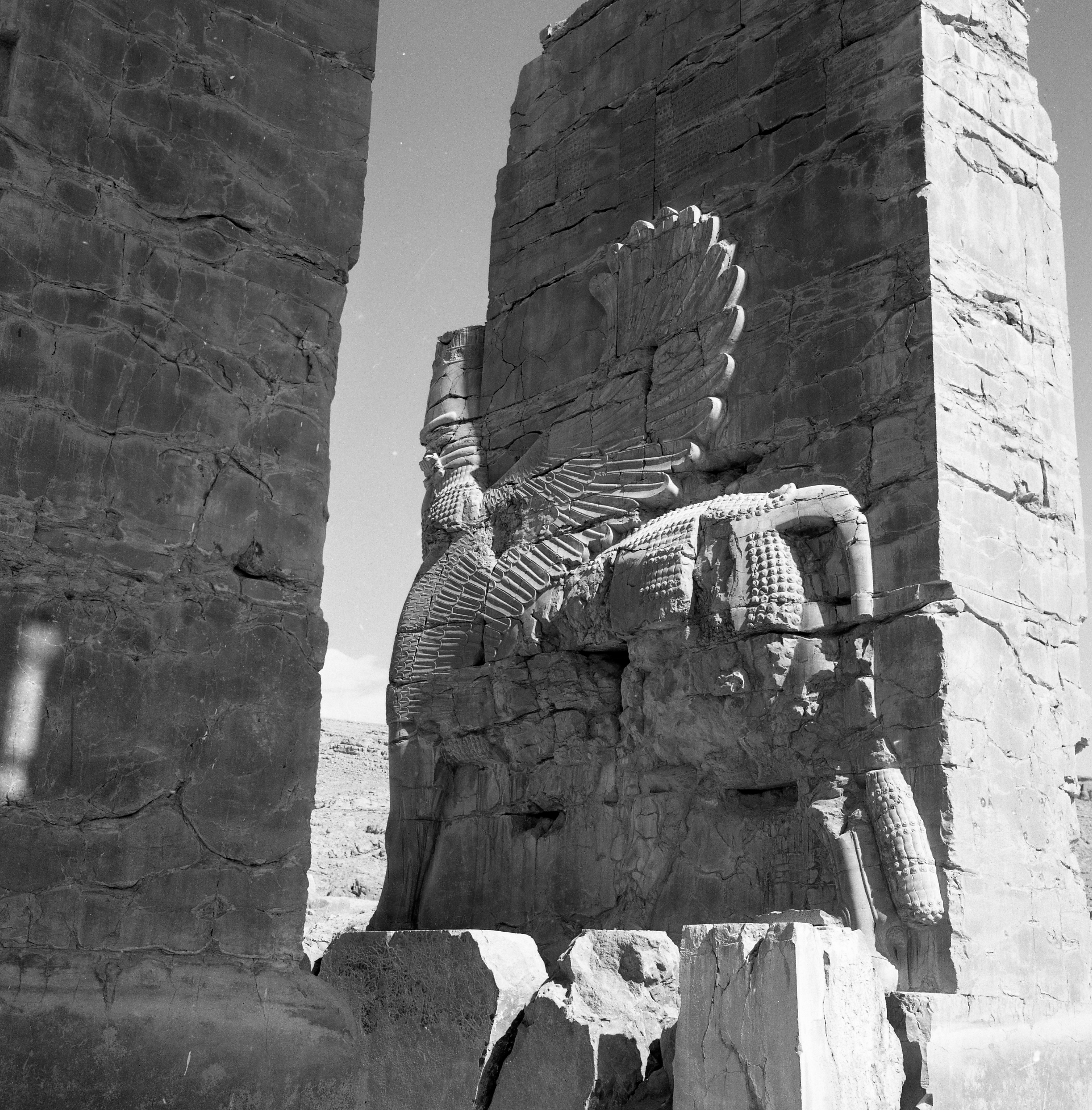
Photo from 1968 expedition to Iran taken by Beno Rothenberg

Wertime served in the Office of Strategic Services in China during World War II and then became a China analyst in the State Department. He then worked as a Cultural Attaché in the U.S. Embassy in Tehran (1960-1963) and in Athens (1969-1972). In 1960s he edited Voice of America's radio program "Forum". He worked for the U.S. Information Agency and worked as its energy program officer for two years. He retired in 1975.

Wertime also worked as a research associate at the Smithsonian Institution's National Museum of Natural History. He was a proponent of study of ancient pyrotechnology, or fire usage techniques in metallurgy. He organized four expeditions to Iran to study it, to the north of Iran in 1961, 1962, a survey of "The Great Persian Desert" in 1966, and then in 1967. Cyril Stanley Smith participated in two expeditions to Iran.

His 1968 survey was his largest and most ambitious expedition that covered several countries and was funded by the Smithsonian Institution and the National Geographic Society. He gathered a multidisciplinary team: Robert Brill (glass, glazes, and metals), Sam Bingham (photographer), Fred Klinger (geologist), Fred Matson (ceramics), Ezzat Negahban (archaeology), Radomír Pleiner, Beno Rothenberg and Ronald F. Tylecote (archaeometallurgists), and John Wertime (Wertime's son and interpreter). The expedition started on 29 July 1968, and routed through Afghanistan to Iran to Turkey, where it finished on 25 September 1968.

He then led two expeditions to Turkey (1970 and 1971), and expedition across Turkey, Cyprus, and the Balkans in 1973. In 1976 he led an expedition to Egypt. His last one was in 1980 to Greece and Cyprus. While Wertime worked as a cultural attache, he gained some proficiency in local languages, that helped in his expeditions.

== Personal life ==
Wertime married Bernice "Peggy". They had four sons, John T., Richard A., Steven F. and Charles M. He was a member of the Presbyterian Church of the Falling Spring. From 1936 to 1976, he lived in the Washington, D.C., area. He lived in Arlington, Virginia, for a time. Later in life, he lived in McConnellsburg, Pennsylvania.

Wertime died of cancer on April 8, 1982, at Chambersburg Hospital in Chambersburg.

== Selected publications ==
- 1951 North Korea: A Case Study of a Soviet Satellite. United States Department of State. December 2, 2023. (published in 1962)
- 1954 "The Discovery of the Element Carbon," Osiris, pp. 211–20.
- 1962 The Coming of the Age of Steel (Chicago: University of Chicago Press)
- 1964 "Asian Influences on European Metallurgy," Technology and Culture 5:391-97.
- 1964 "Man's First Encounters with Metallurgy," Science 146:1257-67.
- 1968 "A Metallurgical Expedition through the Persian Desert," Science 159:927-35.
- 1968 "Culture and Continuity: A Commentary on Mazlish and Mumford," Technology and Culture 9:203-12.
- 1973 "The Beginnings of Metallurgy: A New Look," Science 182:875-87.
- 1973 "Pyrotechnology: Man's First Industrial Uses of Fire," American Scientist 61: 670–82.
- 1978 The Search for Ancient Tin, edited with Alan D. Franklin and Jacqueline S. Olin (Washington, D.C.: Smithsonian Institution Press)
- 1980 The Coming of the Age of Iron, edited with James D. Muhly (New Haven, Conn.: Yale University Press)
- 1981 "The Origin of Agriculture and Technology (conference report)," Technology and Culture 22:122-24.
- 1982 Early Pyrotechnology: The Evolution of the First Fire-using Industries, edited with Steven F. Wertime (Washington, D.C.: Smithsonian Institution Press)
- 1983 "The Furnace versus the Goat," Journal of Field Archaeology 10:445-52.
