= Cassiterite =

Tin oxide mineral

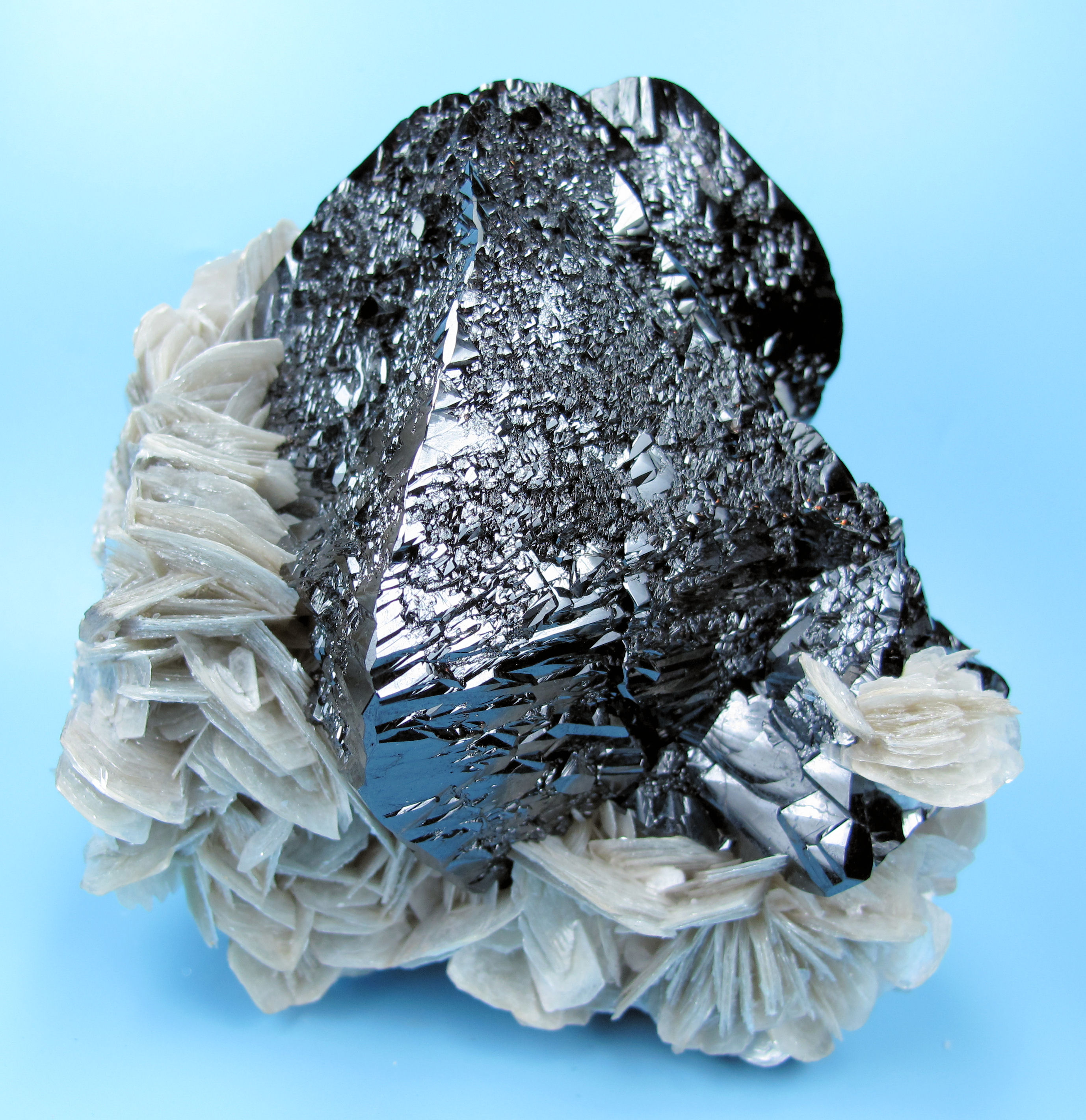
- Cassiterite surrounded by muscovite, from Xuebaoding, Huya, Pingwu, Mianyang, Sichuan, China (size: 100 × 95 mm, 1128 g)

General
- Category: Oxide minerals
- Formula: SnO_{2}
- IMA symbol: Cst
- Strunz classification: 4.DB.05
- Crystal system: Tetragonal
- Crystal class: Ditetragonal dipyramidal (4/mmm); H-M symbol: (4/m 2/m 2/m)
- Space group: P4_{2}/mnm
- Unit cell: a = 4.7382(4) Å, c = 3.1871(1) Å; Z = 2

Identification
- Color: Black, brownish black, reddish brown, brown, red, yellow, gray, white; rarely colorless
- Crystal habit: Pyramidic, prismatic, radially fibrous botryoidal crusts and concretionary masses; coarse to fine granular, massive
- Twinning: Very common on {011}, as contact and penetration twins, geniculated; lamellar
- Cleavage: {100} imperfect, {110} indistinct; partings on {111} or {011}
- Fracture: Subconchoidal to uneven
- Tenacity: Brittle
- Mohs scale hardness: 6–7
- Luster: Adamantine to adamantine metallic, splendent; may be greasy on fractures
- Streak: White to brownish
- Diaphaneity: Transparent when light colored, dark material nearly opaque; commonly zoned
- Specific gravity: 6.98–7.1
- Optical properties: Uniaxial (+)
- Refractive index: n_{ω} = 1.990–2.010 n_{ε} = 2.093–2.100
- Birefringence: δ = 0.103
- Pleochroism: Pleochroic haloes have been observed. Dichroic in yellow, green, red, brown, usually weak, or absent, but strong at times
- Fusibility: infusible
- Solubility: insoluble

Cassiterite is a tin oxide mineral, SnO_{2}. It is generally opaque, but it is translucent in thin crystals. Its luster and multiple crystal faces produce a desirable gem. Cassiterite was the chief tin ore throughout ancient history and remains the most important source of tin today. It is also a semiconductor.

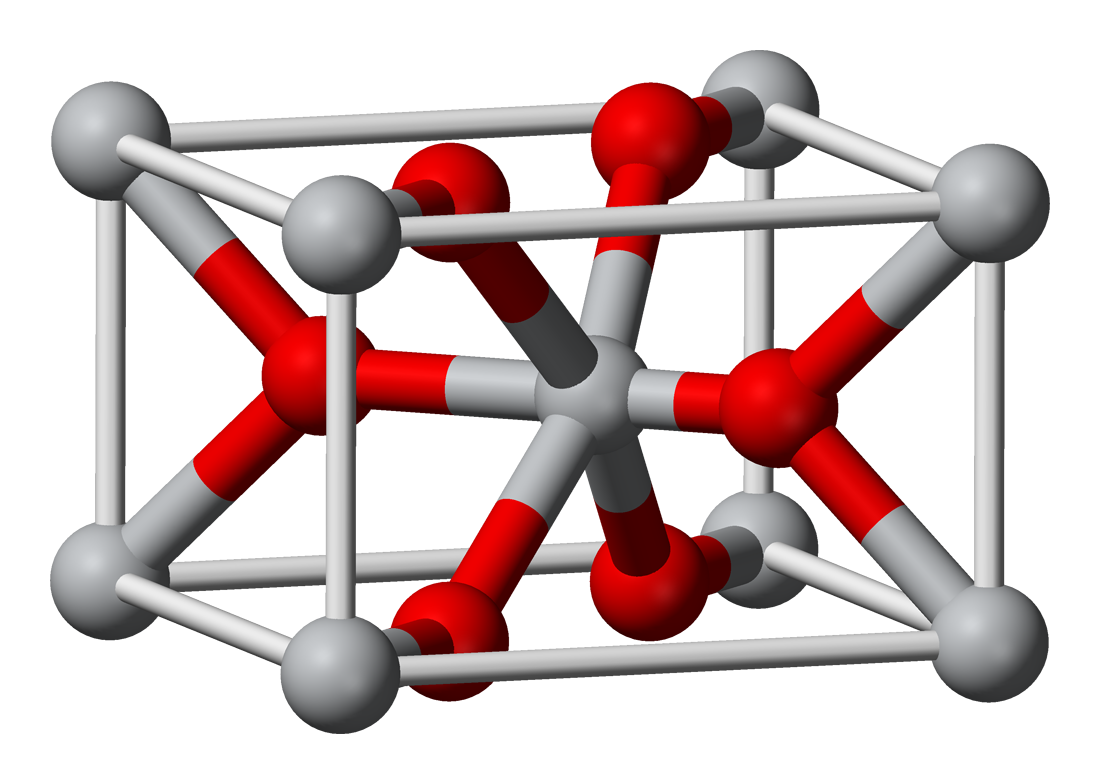
Crystal structure of cassiterite

== Occurrence ==
Most sources of cassiterite today are found in alluvial or placer deposits containing the weathering-resistant grains. The best sources of primary cassiterite are found in the tin mines of Bolivia, where it is found in crystallised hydrothermal veins. Rwanda has an emerging cassiterite mining industry. Fighting over cassiterite deposits (particularly in Walikale) is a major cause of the conflict waged in eastern parts of the Democratic Republic of the Congo. This has led to cassiterite being considered a conflict mineral.

Cassiterite is a widespread minor constituent of igneous rocks. The Bolivian veins and the 4500 year old workings of Cornwall and Devon, England, are concentrated in high temperature quartz veins and pegmatites associated with granitic intrusives. The veins commonly contain tourmaline, topaz, fluorite, apatite, wolframite, molybdenite, and arsenopyrite. The mineral occurs extensively in Cornwall as surface deposits on Bodmin Moor, for example, where there are extensive traces of a hydraulic mining method known as streaming. The current major tin production comes from placer or alluvial deposits in Malaysia, Thailand, Indonesia, the Maakhir region of Somalia, and Russia. Hydraulic mining methods are used to concentrate mined ore, a process which relies on the high specific gravity of the SnO_{2} ore, of about 7.0.

== Crystallography ==
Crystal twinning is common in cassiterite and most aggregate specimens show crystal twins. The typical twin is bent at a near-60-degree angle, forming an "elbow twin". Botryoidal or reniform cassiterite is called wood tin.

Cassiterite is also used as a gemstone and collector specimens when quality crystals are found.

== Etymology ==
The name derives from the Greek κασσίτερος (transliterated as "kassiteros") for "tin". Early references to κασσίτερος can be found in Homer's Iliad, such as in the description the Shield of Achilles. For example, the passage in book 18 chapter 610:

αὐτὰρ ἐπεὶ δὴ τεῦξε σάκος μέγα τε στιβαρόν τε,

610τεῦξ᾽ ἄρα οἱ θώρηκα φαεινότερον πυρὸς αὐγῆς,

τεῦξε δέ οἱ κόρυθα βριαρὴν κροτάφοις ἀραρυῖαν

καλὴν δαιδαλέην, ἐπὶ δὲ χρύσεον λόφον ἧκε,

τεῦξε δέ οἱ κνημῖδας ἑανοῦ κασσιτέροιο.

Translated as:

then wrought he for him a corselet brighter than the blaze of fire, and he wrought for him a heavy helmet, fitted to his temples, a fair helm, richly-dight, and set thereon a crest of gold; and he wrought him greaves of pliant tin. But when the glorious god of the two strong arms had fashioned all the armour

Liddell-Scott-Jones suggest the etymology to be originally Elamite; citing the Babylonian kassi-tira, hence the sanskrit kastīram. However the Akkadian word (the lingua franca of the Ancient Near East, including Babylonia) for tin was "anna-ku" (cuneiform: 𒀭𒈾). Roman Ghirshman (1954) suggests, from the region of the Kassites, an ancient people in west and central Iran; a view also taken by J D Muhly. There are relatively few words in Ancient Greek that begin with "κασσ-"; suggesting that it is an ethnonym. Attempts at understanding the etymology of the word were made in antiquity, such as Pliny the Elder in his Historia Naturalis (book 34 chapter 37.1):

"White lead (tin) is the most valuable; the Greeks applied to it the name cassheros".

And Stephanus of Byzantium in his Ethnica states:

"Κασσίτερα νησοσ εν τω Ωκεανω, τη Ίνδικη προσεχης, ως Διονυσιοσ εν Βασσαρικοισ. Εξ ης ο κασσίτερος."

Which can be translated as:

Kassitera, an island in the ocean, neighbouring India, as Dionysius states in the Bassarika. From there comes tin.

== Use ==
It may be primarily used as a raw material for tin extraction and smelting.

== Gallery ==
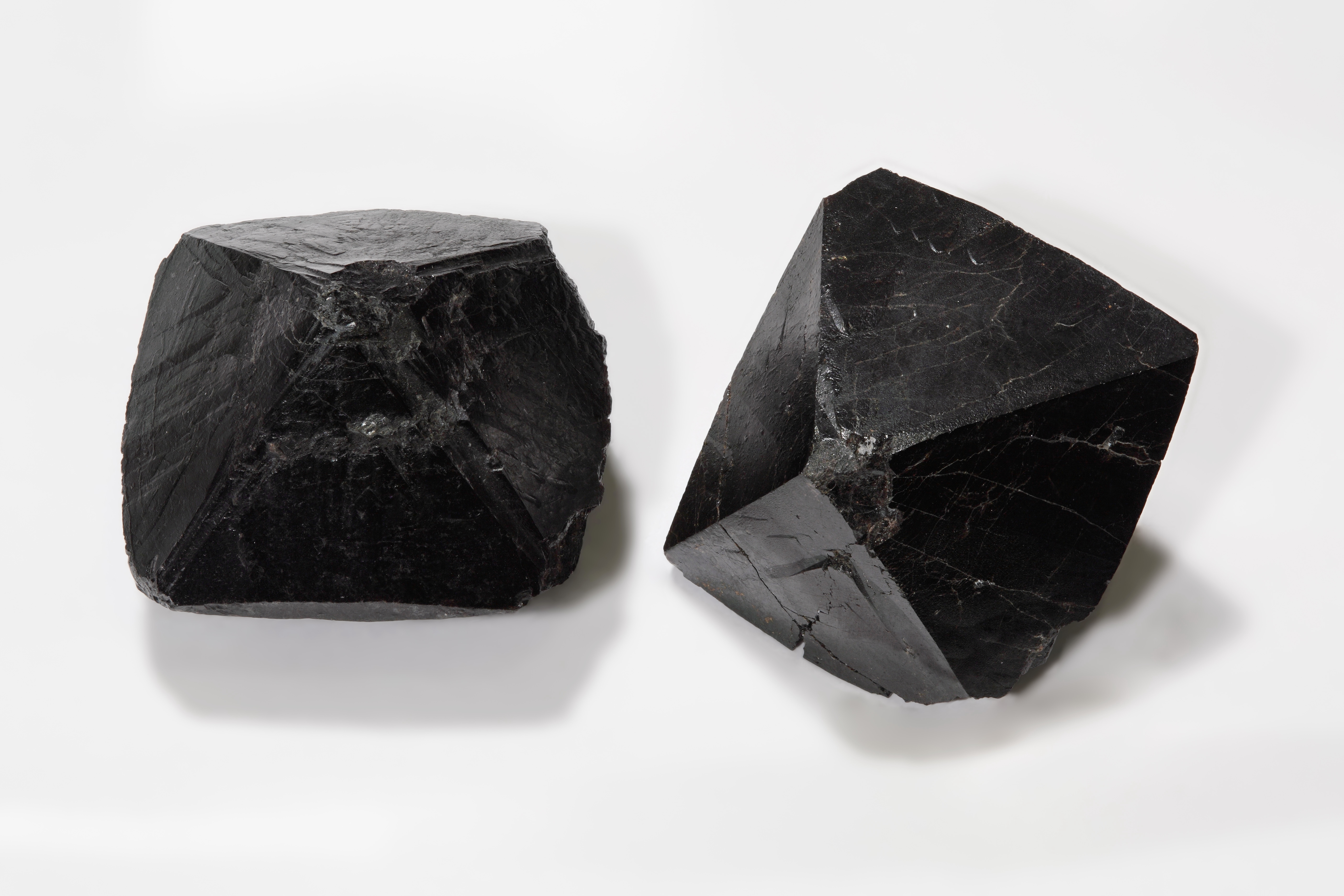
Cassiterite bipyramids, edge length c. 30 mm, Sichuan, China

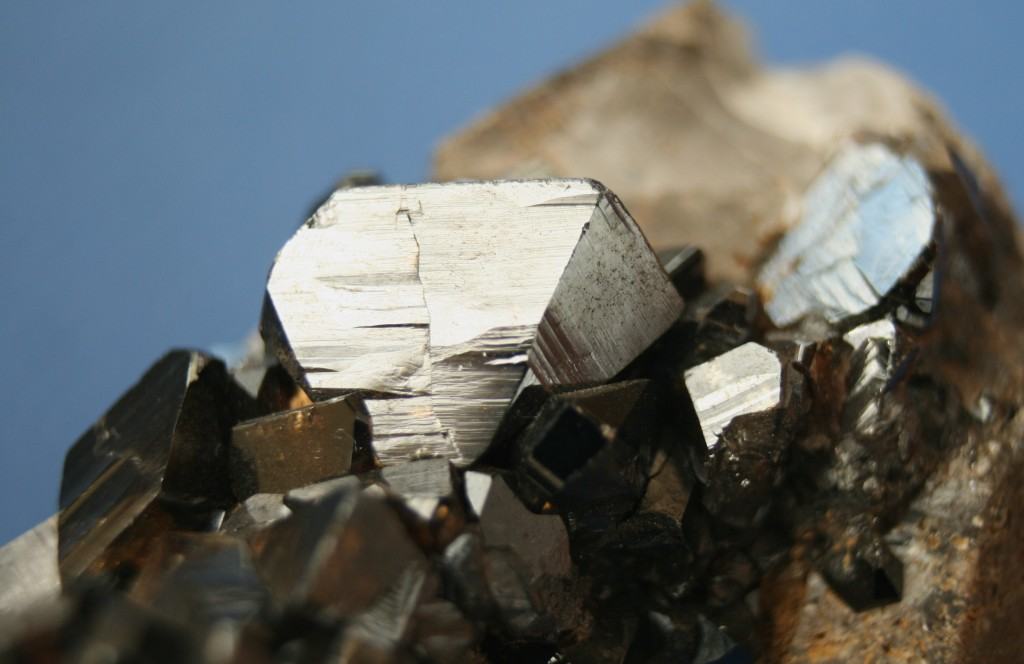
Close up of cassiterite crystals, Blue Tier tinfield, Tasmania, Australia

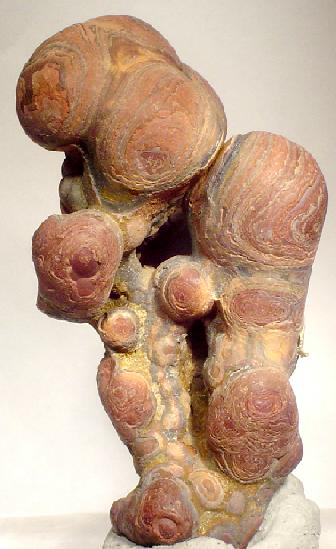
"Wood tin" cassiterite. Durango, Mexico
