= Strode =

Strode may refer to:

- Strode (surname)
- Strode's College, a sixth form college located in Egham, Surrey
- Strode College, a tertiary institution and further education college situated in Street, Somerset, England
  - Strode Theatre, a small theatre and cinema within Strode College
- Strode House, a historic landmark in Tuscaloosa, Alabama
- The verb, strode, the past tense of stride, a form of gait

== See also ==
- Strode's case, one of the earliest and most important English cases dealing with parliamentary privilege
- Privilege of Parliament Act 1512, commonly known as Strode's Act, passed in response to the case
- Laurie Strode, a fictional character from the Halloween film series
- Stroad, a type of thoroughfare that is a mix between a street and a road
