= Courts of the Vice-Warden of the Stannaries =

Stannaries Court Act 1640
- Act of Parliament
- Parliament of England
- Long title: An Act against divers Incroachments and Oppressions in the Stannary Courts.
- Citation: 16 Cha. 1. c. 15
- Territorial extent: England and Wales

Dates
- Royal assent: 7 August 1641
- Commencement: 3 November 1640 (Note: Start of session.)
- Repealed: 1 January 1897
Other legislation
Amended by	Statute Law Revision Act 1888
Repealed by	Stannaries Court (Abolition) Act 1896

Status: Repealed

Text of statute as originally enacted

Stannaries Act 1855 (Note: The citation of this act by this short title was authorised by section 1 of, and the first schedule to, the Short Titles Act 1896. Due to the repeal of those provisions it is now authorised by section 19(2) of the Interpretation Act 1978.)
- Act of Parliament
- Parliament of the United Kingdom
- Long title: An Act to amend and extend the Jurisdiction of the Stannary Court.
- Citation: 18 & 19 Vict. c. 32
- Territorial extent: United Kingdom

Dates
- Royal assent: 15 June 1855
- Commencement: 15 June 1855 (Note: The Acts of Parliament (Commencement) Act 1793.)
Other legislation
Amends	Stannaries Act 1836; Stannaries Act 1839
Amended by	Statute Law Revision Act 1875; Stannaries Court (Abolition) Act 1896

Status: Amended

Text of statute as originally enacted

Revised text of statute as amended

Text of the Stannaries Act 1855 as in force today (including any amendments) within the United Kingdom, from legislation.gov.uk.

Stannaries Court (Abolition) Act 1896 (Note: Section 7.)
- Act of Parliament
- Parliament of the United Kingdom
- Long title: An Act for abolishing the Court of the Vice-Warden of the Stannaries.
- Citation: 59 & 60 Vict. c. 45
- Territorial extent: United Kingdom

Dates
- Royal assent: 14 August 1896
- Commencement: 1 January 1897 (Note: Section 6.)
Other legislation
Amends	Stannaries Act 1855
Repeals/revokes	Stannaries Court Act 1640; Stannaries Act 1839
Amended by	Statute Law Revision Act 1908; Statute Law Revision Act 1966; Arbitration Act 1996; Constitutional Reform Act 2005; Crime and Courts Act 2013

Status: Current legislation

Text of statute as originally enacted

Revised text of statute as amended

Text of the Stannaries Court (Abolition) Act 1896 as in force today (including any amendments) within the United Kingdom, from legislation.gov.uk.

The courts of the Vice-Warden of the Stannaries, commonly known as the stannary courts, were English courts in Cornwall and Devon that enforced the stannary law between the High Middle Ages and their abolition by the Stannaries Court (Abolition) Act 1896 (59 & 60 Vict. c. 45).

From 1201, tin miners in Devon and Cornwall were exempt from the jurisdiction of all English courts other than that of the Vice-Warden of the Stannaries.

The jurisdiction of the Cornwall stannary institutions covered the whole of the duchy, while the stannary courts of Devon had a reputation for harsh justice, and once jailed a Westminster MP (Richard Strode).

The Devon and Cornwall stannary courts were merged into a single Stannaries Court by the Stannaries Act 1855 (18 & 19 Vict. c. 32).

According to Thomas Pitt, judgments from the court could be appealed to the Vice-Warden of the Stanneries, then to the Warden, then finally to the Prince in Council.

== See also ==
- Stannary law
- Cornish Stannary Parliament
- Stannary Convocation of Devon
- Duchy of Cornwall
