= Strode (surname) =

Strode is a surname. Notable people with the surname include:

- Andre Strode (born 1972), American player of gridiron football
- Aubrey E. Strode (1873–1946), American lawyer and politician
- Bill Strode (1937–2006), an American photographer
- Blake Strode (born 1987), American tennis player
- Charles Strode (born 1957), former professional tennis player from the United States
- Duffey Strode, American child preacher
- Haley Strode (born 1987), American actress
- Hudson Strode (1892–1976), an author and professor of creative writing at the University of Alabama
- James M. Strode (fl. 1827–1848), militia officer and politician from the U.S. state of Illinois
- Jesse Burr Strode (1845–1924), Nebraska Republican politician
- Jez Strode (born 1958), drummer for the British pop band Kajagoogoo
- Lester Strode (born 1958), bullpen coach for the Chicago Cubs
- Morris Skip Strode (born 1960), American tennis player
- Ralph Strode (fl. 1350–1400), an English schoolman and writer
- Richard Strode (disambiguation), various people
- William Strode (1598–1645), English politician
- William Strode (disambiguation), various people
- Woody Strode (1914–1994), African-American decathlete, football star and actor

== Fictional ==
The surname "Strode" has been used in fiction. This includes:

- Laurie Strode, a character in the Halloween film series. She first appeared in Halloween.

== See also ==
- Alfred Rowland Chetham-Strode (1823–1890), New Zealand colonial public servant and politician
- Warren Chetham-Strode (1896–1974), English author and playwright
