= Revived Cornish Stannary Parliament =

Cornish nationalist organization established in 1974

The Revived Cornish Stannary Parliament (Cornish: Seneth Stenegow Kernow), was a pressure group which claimed to be a revival of the historic Cornish Stannary Parliament last held in 1753. It was established in 1974 and campaigned, up until 2008, against the government of the United Kingdom's position on the constitutional status of Cornwall.

== Status ==
The historic Cornish Stannary Parliament last assembled at Truro in 1752, and continued until 11 September 1753. The RCSP formed in 1974 claims continuity from the historic parliament on the grounds that the English legal system does not recognise desuetude (laws lapsing through lack of use), and cites the precedent of the Court of Chivalry, which sat in 1952 for the first time in over 200 years. Their contention is that the Stannary Parliament, whilst not in session, still exists. They also point to the fact that the 1508 Charter of Pardon from which the historic parliament derived its powers, was confirmed as still being on the statute books in 1977.

This was also confirmed in a reply to a question posed by the MP Andrew George in May 2009.

The British government rejects the claims of the group. In March 2007, Bridget Prentice, Parliamentary Under-Secretary of State in the Ministry of Justice stated in a written answer in the House of Commons "...there are no valid Cornish stannary organisations in existence.", "There are no treaties today that apply to Cornwall only..." and that " There is no special status for legislation which applies to Cornwall or to Cornish localities."

== History ==
On 20 May 1974, a pressure group, claiming to be a "revived" Cornish Stannary Parliament, assembled in Lostwithiel. The group interpreted the 1508 charter as applying to all descendants of Cornish tin-miners, and claimed that they had the power to veto all laws made in Westminster, not only those relating to the tin and mineral industries. The meeting was primarily called in response to a crisis in the china clay industry. Employers in the industry had been forbidden by the Pay Board from paying their 9,000 workers the higher wages agreed under a productivity deal. The Lord Warden of the Stannaries, Geoffrey Waldegrave, 12th Earl Waldegrave refused an invitation to open the parliament.

On 24 June, at a meeting at which the stannators wore kilts of Cornish tartan, and at which an unofficial Cornish national anthem was sung, the group proclaimed eighteen articles or acts, including the claim to retain all taxes gathered in the Duchy, the declaration of Saint Piran's Flag to be the national flag, a claim on all mineral rights including oil and natural gas, and sought to reverse recent local government reorganisation. A petition was sent to the Queen declaring that if she did not recognise the parliament they would seize crown lands and properties. They also sought recognition from the United Nations.

On 12 December 1974, the Home Office replied to the petition, saying that the Home Office could only accept elections by the stannary towns as constitutive of a valid stannary parliament. On 15 December, Brian Hambley, using the title "Lord Protector of the Stannaries", said they had decided to postpone the seizure of property in St Austell to give the four town councils an opportunity to appoint stannators. Hambley claimed there was a constitutional crisis and that should be done "immediately to avoid political anarchy".

The Revived Cornish Stannary Parliament next hit the headlines in 1978, again at St Austell Magistrates' Court. Hambley had been charged with having failed to pay motor tax and displaying the stannary seal in place of a tax disc. His defence was that he was exempt from the court's jurisdiction because he was a "privileged tinner", having staked out several acres of moorland, with a view to working them for tin on land belonging to the lord-lieutenant of the county. After two and a half hours consultation, the magistrates agreed they had no jurisdiction. The following day a court in Bodmin adjourned a similar case sine die against Frederick Trull. On 11 July, the county court (which had the powers of the old stannary courts, under the Stannaries Court (Abolition) Act 1896), declared that the lands Hambley claimed to have staked were already bounded, and ordered him to pay the landowners' costs. By the end of July, over a hundred people were refusing to pay road tax in Cornwall, but a decision of the High Court gave the Home Office leave to quash the original magistrates' decision.

The Revived Cornish Stannary Parliament's next large campaign was in 1989, and related to the introduction of the unpopular community charge or poll tax. They claimed that, because the law imposing the charge had not been approved by the Stannary Parliament, "all tin-miners and former tin-miners, all descendants of tin-miners, all shareholders in tin-mines and anyone who supplied equipment for tin-mining" were exempt from the tax. Shares were made available for sale in the Royal Cornish Consols United Tin Mines Cost Book Company at one pound each, the claim being that shareholders would not be liable for the charge. The company was owned by Frederick Trull, who had rejoined the group as its clerk. By March 1990, up to one and a quarter million applications for shares had been made. On 22 March, the Department of Trade and Industry was granted an injunction in the High Court freezing the company's assets, on the grounds that the company was not registered under the Companies Act 1985, and that Mr Trull was not authorised under the Financial Services Act 1986 to conduct investment business.

On 27 June, the company was placed in receivership, with shareholders potentially facing the payment of costs. On 5 September, the receiver announced that Trull had vanished and that there was no trace of the estimated £1 million paid by members of the public. On 12 October, Trull was found guilty of contempt by breaching High Court orders to stop issuing shares, and for failing to disclose the whereabouts of the money. He was sentenced in his absence to six months imprisonment. The presiding judge, Mr Justice Harman, said "The matter may be based on a genuine belief by Mr Trull in the privileges of Cornish tin miners but has all the appearance of being a con trick." On 22 February 1991, Trull appeared before the High Court, and his sentence was reduced to three months and suspended for two years, on the condition that he undertook to help the Department of Trade and Industry recover the money invested by the public. Trull's counsel told the court that the money had gone to "the sharks of this world" and that Trull was "fired not by dishonesty, but by obsessive belief in the Stannary laws". Trull remained clerk of the "revived" parliament, and in November was again before the courts claiming the Bodmin magistrates had no jurisdiction to make orders for payment against him on behalf of Restormel Borough Council, because he was 'a privileged tinner within the Stannaries of Cornwall.' The case was finally settled against Trull in 1994.

== Operation Chough ==
In 1999 the Revived Cornish Stannary Parliament started a direct action campaign they called "Operation Chough". The organisation wrote to English Heritage demanding it remove all signs bearing the "English Heritage" title from sites it managed in Cornwall by 31 July. Over eleven months, eighteen signs were removed from sites in Cornwall including Carn Euny, Chysauster, Pendennis Castle and Tintagel. The "Keeper of the Seal of the Stannary Parliament" wrote to English Heritage saying "The signs have been confiscated and held as evidence of English cultural aggression in Cornwall. Such racially motivated signs are deeply offensive and cause distress to many Cornish people". On 18 January 2002, at Truro Crown Court, three members of the group agreed to return the signs and pay £4,500 in compensation to English Heritage and to be bound over to keep the peace. In return, the prosecution dropped charges of conspiracy to cause criminal damage. The case was unusual as a public-interest immunity certificate was presented to the court by the Crown Prosecution Service about ten minutes into the hearing. This prevented some defence evidence from being heard. The Revived Cornish Stannary Parliament believed the reason for the introduction of the PII certificate was that the Duchy of Cornwall refuses to reveal the circumstances under which it transferred several of its properties (including Tintagel Castle) to the management of English Heritage.

== Elections ==
Elections to Revived Cornish Stannary are from among the Cornish Stannary Community. To be a member of the Cornish Stannary Community you have to declare that "I am Cornish as one of my parents is of direct indigenous Cornish descent or I am Cornish by marriage, and that therefore, I consider myself to be an "heir and successor" of the Cornish Stannary Community who secured the Charter of Pardon from King Henry VII in 1508". The elected officers of the Cornish Stannary Parliament are not published. There is a further organisation attached to CSP, known as the Cornish Citizens Association which has a more inclusive membership policy not based on race.

== RCSP claims ==
The RCSP campaigned against the lack of a written constitutional text to protect British 'subjects' from abuse of power by the state and have highlighted the absence of a British constitutional/statutory guarantee of the principle of equality before the law (cf Fourteenth Amendment to the United States Constitution). They raised concerns with the British government regarding the failure by the state to include Article 13 of the European Convention on Human Rights in its Human Rights Act 1998, the failure by the state to ratify Protocol 12 of the ECHR, the failure by the state to incorporate the European Directive 2000/43/EC on Anti-discrimination into domestic legislation by introducing what the RCSP claim is the inadequate Statutory Instrument 1626. They have also raised concerns regarding the retention of an unelected head of state and associated upper chamber of parliament (House of Lords), and the retention of what the RCSP calls an archaic and undemocratic Privy Council of the United Kingdom.

The RCSP asserts that Cornish people are subject to forced assimilation by an education system that fails to provide them with an adequate level of knowledge about their history and, hence, their identity. They also claimed that there are persistent attempts by state authorities to deny Cornish people their identity, for example, in the national census, pupil level annual school census, exclusion from the Framework Convention for the Protection of National Minorities, and denial of adequate financial cultural/linguistic resources.

The organisation's website says that the group has been active in seeking repayment of alleged over-taxation on tin mined in Cornwall, and to have lodged documents with the European Court of Human Rights.

== Other activities ==
In 2007 the Revived Cornish Stannary Parliament presented at Truro Crown Court having put together a demand to restrict the 'rights and privileges' of the Duke of Cornwall, The Prince of Wales, in his role within the Duchy.

- The RCSP campaigned, along with other Cornish organisations, for the Cornish to be recognised by the UK government under the Council of Europe's Framework Convention for the Protection of National Minorities.
- The RCSP says it campaigned, along with Mebyon Kernow and other Cornish organisations for the inclusion of a Cornish tick box on the 2011 census, although this was not successful and the forms as issued did not include a Cornish tick box. For the first time the Cornish were allocated the '06' census code for the 2001 Census but there have been claims that the actual number of people registering as Cornish would have been much higher if a Cornish option tick box had been included. 37,500 people wrote that they had Cornish ethnicity on the 2001 census form. The RCSP said that many Cornish people were unaware of the new option and the figures would have been much higher if the tick-box was available.

== See also ==
- List of topics related to Cornwall
- Cornish nationalism
- Cornwall 2000
- Cornish Stannary Parliament
- Stannary Convocation of Devon
- Duchy of Cornwall
- Stannary law
