= Stannary Convocation of Devon =

Devon Stannary Parliament Konsel Stenegow Dewnens

Type
- Type: Unicameral

History
- Established: 1201
- Disbanded: 1748 (last session, never formally abolished)
- Succeeded by: Parliament of Great Britain
- Seats: 96

Elections
- Voting system: Election with limited suffrage

Meeting place
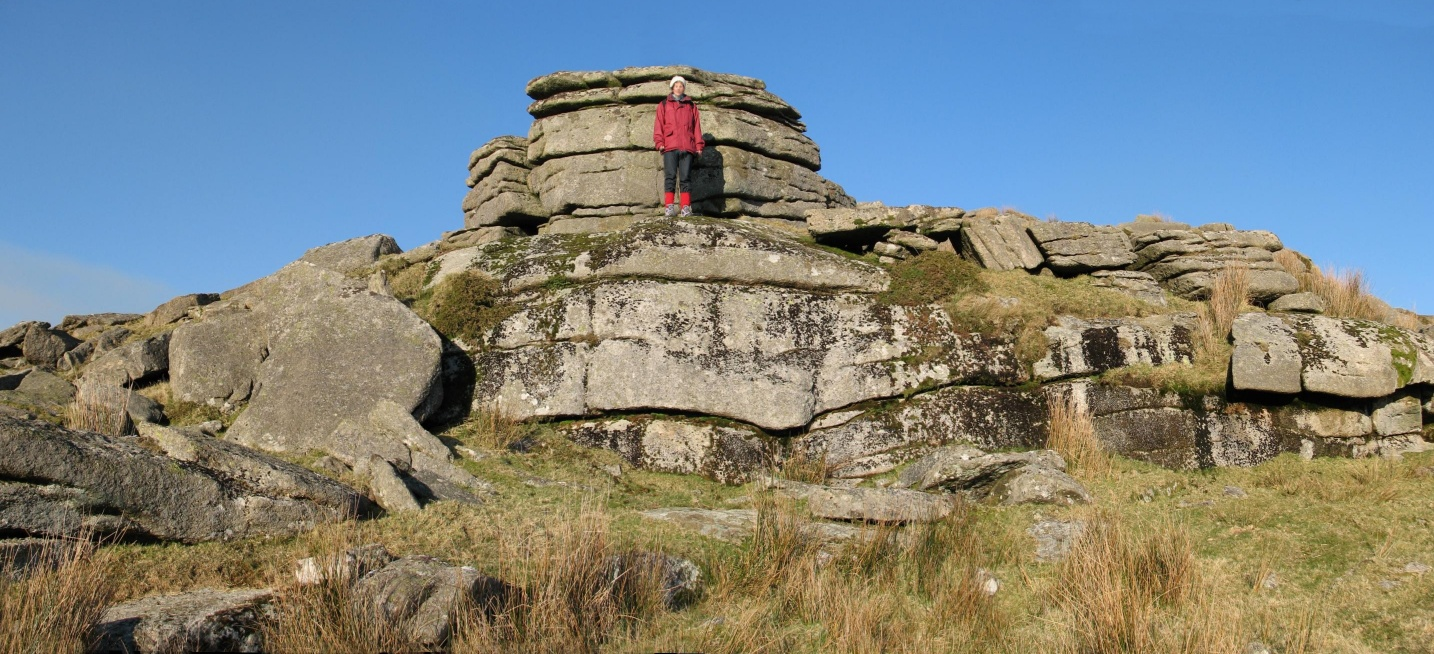
- Crockern Tor, Dartmoor

The Stannary Convocation of Devon, also known as the Great Parliament of the Tinners or as the Devon Stannary Parliament, was an assembly in the English county of Devon, with the power to amend and expand the stannary law in the county. Initially assembled in the Middle Ages by the Lord Warden of the Stannaries, the Stannary Convocation developed out of the predecessor to the judicial Courts of the Vice-Warden of the Stannaries (which were abolished in 1896) but was established as an institution in its own right by the sixteenth century, with the power to both proclaim the existing customs as English law and to legislate regarding the laws by which tinners, who were exempt from the jurisdiction of the ordinary English courts until 1896, conducted their business.

== History ==
The origins of the Stannary Convocations of both Devon and Cornwall are uncertain. Some Cornish nationalists have asserted that the stannary law and institutions of Cornwall and Devon predate the Roman conquest of Britain in 43 CE, although it is more likely that stannary law (as a part of the English legal code) emerged in the twelfth century as an attempt to codify the existing customs relating to tin mining and was therefore influenced by Celtic, Anglo-Saxon and Norman practices. The first written accounts of stannary law, from which the stannary institutions developed, were in relation to tin coinage (a tax payable to the Crown on smelted tin), which is first recorded as having been collected in 1156, although by that time it was recognised that there was already a body of customary law that governed the practices of tin miners, merchants and smelters. From the perspective of English law, no special administrative arrangements were made for the stannaries before 1198, which suggests that litigation in respect of the mines was brought in the ordinary hundred and shire courts of Devon and Cornwall.

In November 1197, William de Wrotham was appointed to 'act in all matters concerning the King in the stannaries,' and in January 1198, Hubert Walter, the justicar and chief minister to King Richard I, issued a writ convening juries of tinners 'who are better informed about the truth of the matter' before de Wrotham at Exeter and Launceston to declare the law and practice relating to tin coinage. The academic consensus is that both the Stannary Convocations and Courts originated from these sessions of jurymen. In addition to establishing the predecessor to the Convocations and the Courts, Walter's writ also confirmed the 'just and ancient customs and liberties' of the tinners and appointed de Wrotham as the Lord Warden of the Stannaries.

In 1201, King John I granted the Charter of Liberties to the Tinners of Cornwall and Devon, which made tinners subject only the legal jurisdiction of the Chief Warden and released them from the obligations of serfdom under the feudal system. The charter also gives the Chief Warden 'and his stewards' the power to try tinners and imprison them in the stannary jail. Over the course of the thirteenth century, four stannaries were established in Devon covering different parts of Dartmoor, centred on Chagford, Ashburton, Tavistock and Plympton. On the basis of the 1201 Charter, the Lord Warden set up four steward's courts to preside over the tinners who worked in these stannaries. King Edward I granted the tinners of Devon the Charter of 1305, which more specifically granted immunity to the tinners from the other courts of England 'for all pleas arising within the said stannaries except pleas of land, life and limb.' The Charter of 1305 was approved by the Parliament of England in 1305 and 1343.

The first documented mention of a convention of the Stannary Convocation of Devon was in 1497, when the Lord Warden of the Stannaries called for a meeting of twenty-four 'jurates' representing the tinners of each of the four Devon stannaries, with ninety-six total members present. Although their description as jurates suggests that their function was restricted to clarifying the existing law, as they were called upon to do under de Wrotham in 1198, they described themselves as a 'parliament' and their enactments contained new provisions based on an ordinance of Prince Arthur in Cornwall.

Over the sixteenth century, the Stannary Convocation met several times and expanded the legal code of stannary law in a number of notable ways, demonstrating a legal capacity to legislate regarding the law that bound tinners. As tinners were free from the jurisdiction of the conventional English courts, it would appear that the Convocation had the capacity to legislate on non-tin-related matters, although it generally confined itself to regulating the interactions between various classes of tinner and Dartmoor land owners. The Convocation passed new enactments for the last time in 1600, as its usefulness as an instrument of governance declined as the landowning class predominated over both the Convocation and over the increasingly commercialised business of tin mining. The Convocation sat for the last time before 2018 in 1748.

Despite the long dormancy of the parliament, Plympton resumed the regular appointment of stannators in 1980. However the modern position is functionally identical to that of a mayor rather than a member of a legislative assembly.

== See also ==
- Cornish Stannary Parliament
- Revived Cornish Stannary Parliament
- Stannary law
- Duchy of Cornwall
