= Crockern Tor =

Tor on Dartmoor, England

Coordinates: 50°33′55″N 3°57′22″W

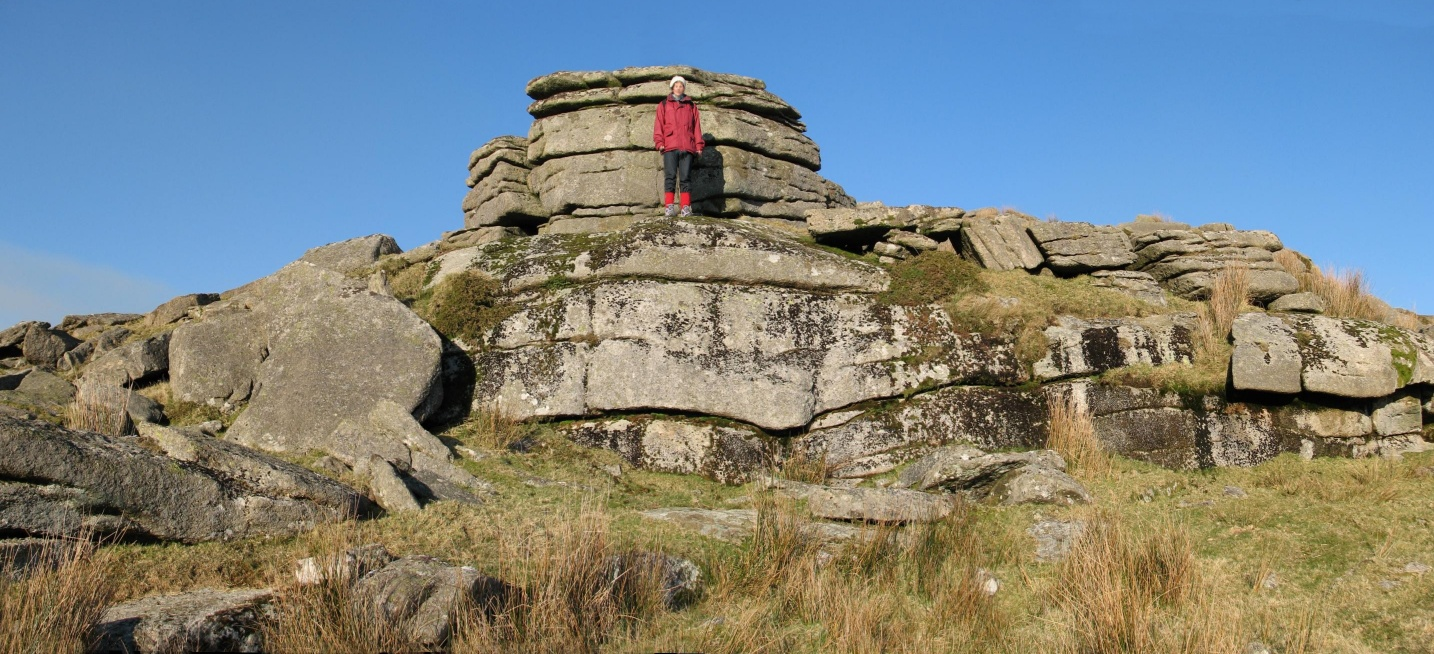
Crockern Tor – Parliament Rock as seen from the "floor" of the Great Court.

Crockern Tor is a tor in Dartmoor National Park, Devon, England. Composed of two large outcrops of rock, it is 396 metres above sea level. The lower outcrop was the open-air meeting place of the Stannary Convocation of Devon from the early 14th century until the first half of the 18th century. On Parliament Rock, pictured here, the Lord Warden of the Great Court of the Devon Tinners supposedly sat during meetings of the Court. The location of the tor is just to the NE of Merrivale.

== Descriptions ==
The tor was one of only three features on Dartmoor that Tristram Risdon considered important enough to include in his Survey of Devon, which was compiled in the early 17th century. In it, he said that "Crockern Torr" had "a table and seats of moorstone [granite], hewn out of the rocks, lying in the force of all weather, no house or refuge being near it". The tor was also one of the few historic features to appear on Benjamin Donn's one-inch-to-the-mile map of Devon in 1765. It lies adjacent to the trans-Dartmoor packhorse track, so it has been a significant landmark for travellers since time immemorial.

== Stannary court ==
The tor was the hub of the four Dartmoor stannary areas – Ashburton, Chagford, Tavistock and Plympton – whose boundaries radiate outwards from it. The Stannary Court was convoked here when deemed necessary, at irregular intervals, by the Lord Warden who summoned 24 representatives or "jurates" from each of the four stannaries. Each meeting probably continued for several days and dealt with matters such as setting stannary law, registering tinworks and mills, hearing petitions and imposing penalties on those guilty of breaking the stannary laws.

There is evidence for ten assemblies at Crockern Tor: in 1494, 1510, 1532, 1533, 1552, 1567, 1574, 1600, 1688 and 1703. The earliest documented meeting on 1 September 1494 had Sir John Stepcote, vice-warden of the Devon Stannaries, as chairman. Sir Walter Raleigh was Lord Warden of the Stannaries for many years, and it is recorded that he presided at one Court at Crockern Tor, on 27 October 1600. The last meeting for which records survive was on 23 September 1703 where the Warden, John Granville, 1st Baron Granville and the Vice-Warden, the Honourable Samuel Rolle, opened the court at 8 a.m. The last court was said to have been held in or around 1745, but no documentation exists, and considering that the tin industry on Dartmoor had by then declined greatly, it could have been only a small affair.

Patchy and conflicting evidence indicates that compared to the bare nature of the site today, there were chairs, seats, a table and a shelter, all made of granite, which were used when the court met. These items were supposedly taken away or broken up in the late 18th century, possibly used as a source of stone for the buildings that started to appear on the moor after the roads were improved. On the other hand, Douglas St Leger-Gordon, the noted writer on Devon history, casts doubt on the existence of any substantial meetings at this "singularly unsuitable" place in his 1963 book, Portrait of Devon. He points out that any proceedings must have been frequently disrupted by the wind carrying away someone's hat, or "scattering the minutes of the last meeting insecurely held in the warden's numbed fingers". He notes that later records of the Parliament mention adjournments to Tavistock and suggests that a nearby "Tinners' Hall" - now lost - may have been where they actually conducted their business.

== Folklore ==
Crockern Tor is said to be the home of the mythical Old Crockern, variously described as a spectral figure on horseback, galloping across the moor on a skeleton horse with his phantom hounds which were stabled at nearby Wistman's Wood; or as a local god of the moor in pre-Christian times:

the gurt old sperit of the moors, Old Crockern himself, grey as granite, and his eyebrows hanging down over his glimmering eyes like sedge, and his eyes as deep as peat water pools.

— Sabine Baring-Gould A Book of the West, 1899

== Gallery ==
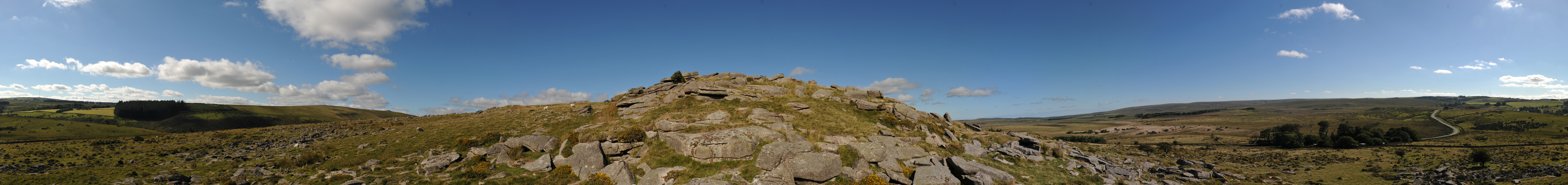
Panorama of Crockern Tor
