= Richard Strode =

Richard Strode may refer to:

- Richard Strode (floruit 1512), tinner and British Member of Parliament for Plympton Erle, Devon
- Richard Strode (died 1581), MP for Plympton Erle 1553 and 1559
- Sir Richard Strode (1584–1669), MP for Bere Alston 1604, Bridport 1626 and Plympton Erle 1640
- Richard Strode (1638–1707), British Member of Parliament for Plympton Erle from 1685-1689 and 1690
