= Strode's case =

English court case on parliamentary privilege

Strode's Case 3 Howell's State Trials 294 is one of the earliest and most important English cases dealing with parliamentary privilege.

== Facts ==
Richard Strode was a Member of Parliament from Devon, England. In 1512, he introduced a bill to alleviate the harsh working conditions of tin miners on Dartmoor. However, the local stannary court had jurisdiction to enforce a law against the obstruction of tin mining and Strode was prosecuted and imprisoned before he could travel to Westminster to present his bill.

== Strode's Act ==
In response, Parliament passed Strode's Act, now named the Privilege of Parliament Act 1512 (4 Hen. 8. c. 8):

...AND over that be it enacted by the said authority that all suits, accusations, condemnations, executions, fines, amerciaments, punishments, corrections, grievances, charges and impositions put or had or hereafter to be put or had unto or upon the said Richard [Strode] and to every other of the person or persons afore specified, that now be of this present parliament or that of any parliament hereafter shall be, for any bill speaking, reasoning, or declaring of any matter or matters concerning the parliament to be convened and treated of be utterly void and of none effect. And over that be it enacted by the said authority that if the said Richard Strode or any of all the said other person or persons hereafter be vexed, troubled or otherwise charged for any causes as is afore said, that then he or they and every of them so vexed or troubled of and for the same to have action upon the case against every such person or persons so vexing or troubling any contrary to this ordinance and provision, in the which action the party grieved shall recover treble damages and costs, and that no protection, essoin, nor Wager of Law in the said action in any wise be admitted nor received.

== Constitutional implications ==
In 1629, in the prosecution of Sir John Eliot (R v. Eliot, Hollis and Valentine), the court held that Strode's Act was a private act and applied to Strode only and not to other MPs. However, in 1667, both the Commons and the House of Lords carried resolutions declaring Strode's Act a general law:

... and that it extends to indemnify all and every the Members of both Houses of Parliament, in all Parliaments, for and touching all Bills, speaking, reasoning, or declaring of any Matter or Matters in and concerning the Parliament, to be communed and treated of, and is only a declaratory law of the antient and necessary Rights and Privileges of Parliament.

This establishes the common law that privilege extends beyond mere protection against action for defamation or treason. The law was subsequently codified as Art. 9 of the Bill of Rights 1689.

== Bibliography ==
- Tanner, J. R. (1930) Tudor Constitutional Documents, AD1485-1603 ISBN 0-85594-555-9
- Taswell-Langmead, T. P. (1997) English Constitutional History: From the Teutonic Conquest to the Present Time ISBN 1-56169-245-X
