= Privilege of Parliament Act 1603 =

Act of the Parliament of England

Privilege of Parliament Act 1603 (Note: The citation of this act by this short title was authorised by section 5 of, and the second schedule to, the Statute Law Revision Act 1948. Due to the repeal of those provisions, it is now authorised by section 19(2) of the Interpretation Act 1978.)
- Act of Parliament
- Parliament of England
- Long title: An Acte for new Executions to be sued againste any which shall hereafter be delivered out of Execution by Priviledge of Parliament, and for discharge of them out of whose custody such persons shall be delivered. (Note: These words are printed against this act in the second column of the second schedule to the Statute Law Revision Act 1948, which is headed "Title".)
- Citation: 1 Jas. 1. c. 13
- Territorial extent: England and Wales

Dates
- Royal assent: 7 July 1604
- Commencement: 19 March 1604 (Note: Start of session.)
Other legislation
Amended by	Statute Law Revision Act 1948
Relates to	Privilege of Parliament Act 1512

Status: Amended

Text of statute as originally enacted

Revised text of statute as amended

Text of the Privilege of Parliament Act 1603 as in force today (including any amendments) within the United Kingdom, from legislation.gov.uk.

The Privilege of Parliament Act 1603 or the Parliamentary Privilege Act 1603 (1 Jas. 1. c. 13) is an act of the Parliament of England. It was passed following the imprisonment of Thomas Shirley MP for debt in the Fleet Prison.

This act was partly in force in Great Britain at the end of 2010.

The act was retained for the Republic of Ireland by section 2(2)(a) of, and part 2 of schedule 1 to, the Statute Law Revision Act 2007, which came into force on 8 May 2007.
