= Richard Strode (fl. 1512) =

English politician

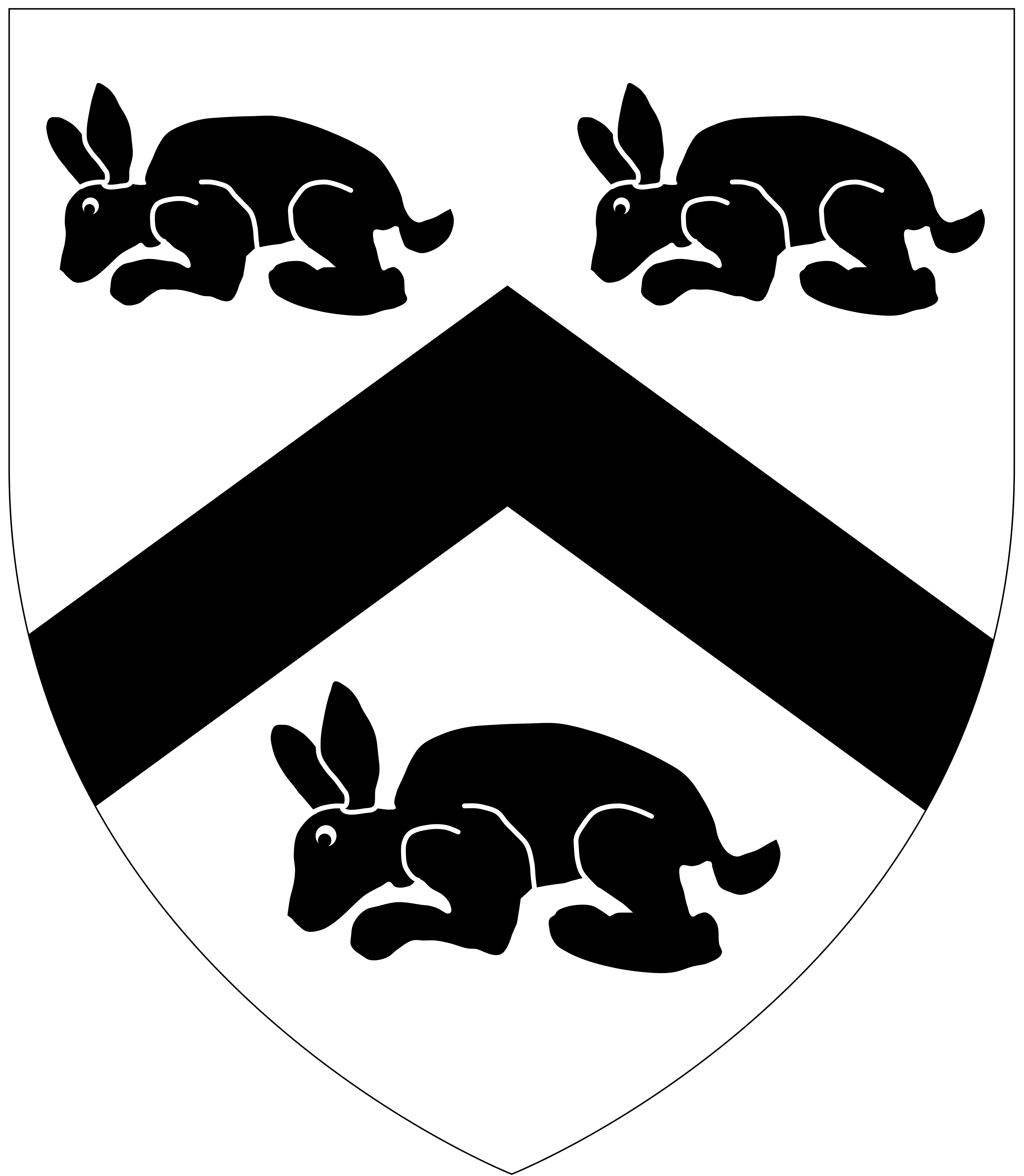
Arms of Strode of Newnham: Argent, a chevron between three conies courant sable

Richard Strode (floruit 1512) was in 1512 a Member of Parliament for Plympton Erle, Devon and was also involved in the tin mining industry. He is best known for having instigated Strode's case, one of the earliest and most important English legal cases dealing with parliamentary privilege.

== Origins ==
Although it is almost certain he belonged to the ancient Strode family seated at Newnham in the parish of Plympton St Mary in Devon, of which many subsequently were MP for Plympton Erle, his identity is not certain. He was possibly the Richard Strode who is known to have married Joan Pennalls, the younger son of Richard Strode (d.1464) of Newnham, whose effigy fully dressed in armour survives in St Mary's Church, Plympton. He would thus have been the heir of his elder brother William Strode (d. 1518) of Newnham. However such an identification cannot be made with certainty.

== Strode's case ==
With the aid of some fellow MPs, Strode attempted to introduce legislation restricting the rights of tin miners on Dartmoor. However, Strode was himself a tinner, and an influential competitor brought charges against Strode in a stannary court, a regional tribunal empowered to judge mining disputes. Strode was fined £160, but refused to pay the fine, whereupon he was imprisoned at Lydford Castle. He was released three weeks later by a letter from the Exchequer; at Strode's request, Parliament had passed a law (Strode's Act) reversing the local court decision and granting him immunity from further prosecution related to his parliamentary activities.

== Sources ==
- Zechariah Chafee Jr. Three Human Rights in the Constitution of 1787. University of Kansas Press, Lawrence, 1956, pp. 27–28.
