= List of acts of the Parliament of England from 1603 =

This is a list of acts of the Parliament of England for the year 1603.

For acts passed during the period 1707–1800, see the list of acts of the Parliament of Great Britain. See also the list of acts of the Parliament of Scotland, and the list of acts of the Parliament of Ireland.

For acts passed from 1801 onwards, see the list of acts of the Parliament of the United Kingdom. For acts of the devolved parliaments and assemblies in the United Kingdom, see the list of acts of the Scottish Parliament, the list of acts of the Northern Ireland Assembly, and the list of acts and measures of Senedd Cymru; see also the list of acts of the Parliament of Northern Ireland.

For medieval statutes, etc. that are not considered to be acts of Parliament, see the list of English statutes.

See also the List of ordinances and acts of the Parliament of England, 1642–1660 for ordinances and acts passed by the Long Parliament and other bodies without royal assent, and which were not considered to be valid legislation following the Restoration in 1660.

The number shown after each act's title is its chapter number. Acts are cited using this number, preceded by the years of the reign during which the relevant parliamentary session was held; thus the Union with Ireland Act 1800 is cited as "39 & 40 Geo. 3. c. 67", meaning the 67th act passed during the session that started in the 39th year of the reign of George III and which finished in the 40th year of that reign. The modern convention is to use Arabic numerals in citations (thus "41 Geo. 3" rather than "41 Geo. III"). Acts of the last session of the Parliament of Great Britain and the first session of the Parliament of the United Kingdom are both cited as "41 Geo. 3".

Acts passed by the Parliament of England did not have a short title; however, some of these acts have subsequently been given a short title by acts of the Parliament of the United Kingdom, such as the Short Titles Act 1896 (59 & 60 Vict. c. 14).

Acts passed by the Parliament of England were deemed to have come into effect on the first day of the session in which they were passed. Because of this, the years given in the list below may in fact be the year before a particular act was passed.

== 1 Jas. 1 ==
The first session of the 1st Parliament of King James I (the 'Blessed Parliament') which met from 19 March 1604 until 7 July 1604.

This session was traditionally cited as 1 Jac. 1, 1 Ja. 1, 1 J. 1, 2 Jas. 1, 2 Jac. 1, 2 Ja. 1, 2 J. 1, 1 & 2 Jas. 1, 1 & 2 Jac. 1, 1 & 2 Ja. 1 or 1 & 2 J. 1.

=== Public acts ===
Short title	Citation	Royal assent
Long title
Succession to the Crown Act 1603 (repealed)	1 Jas. 1. c. 1 (Note: This is the citation in The Statutes of the Realm.); 2 Jas. 1. c. 1 (Note: This is the citation in the Statutes at Large.)	7 July 1604
A moste joyfull and juste Recognition of the immediate lawful and undoubted Succession Descent and Righte of the Crowne. (Repealed by Statute Law Revision Act 1948 (11 & 12 Geo. 6. c. 62))
Union of England and Scotland Act 1603 (repealed)	1 Jas. 1. c. 2; 2 Jas. 1. c. 2	7 July 1604
An Acte authorizinge certaine Commissioners of the Realme of England to treate withe Comissioners of Scotland for the weale of both Kingdomes. (Repealed by Statute Law Revision Act 1863 (26 & 27 Vict. c. 125))
Episcopal Lands Act 1603 (repealed)	1 Jas. 1. c. 3; 2 Jas. 1. c. 3	7 July 1604
An Acte againste the Diminuation of the Posessions of Archbishoprickes and Bishoprickes, and for avoydinge of Dilapidations of the same. (Repealed by Statute Law Revision Act 1948 (11 & 12 Geo. 6. c. 62))
Jesuits etc. Act 1603 (repealed)	1 Jas. 1. c. 4; 2 Jas. 1. c. 4	7 July 1604
An Acte for the due Execution of the Statutes against Jesuites Seminary Preistes Recusants &c. (Repealed for England and Wales by Religious Disabilities Act 1846 (9 & 10 Vict. c. 59) and for the Isle of Man by Statute Law Revision (Isle of Man) Act 1991 (c. 61))
Court Leet Act 1603 (repealed)	1 Jas. 1. c. 5; 2 Jas. 1. c. 5	7 July 1604
An Acte to prevent the overcharge of the People by Stewards of Courte Leets and Courte Barons. (Repealed by Statute Law Revision Act 1958 (6 & 7 Eliz. 2. c. 46))
Labourers Act 1603 (repealed)	1 Jas. 1. c. 6; 2 Jas. 1. c. 6	7 July 1604
An Acte made for the Explanation of the Statute made in the Fifte Year of the late Queen Elizabethe's Reigne, concerninge Labourers. (Repealed by Repeal of Obsolete Statutes Act 1856 (19 & 20 Vict. c. 64))
Vagabonds Act 1603 (repealed)	1 Jas. 1. c. 7; 2 Jas. 1. c. 7	7 July 1604
An Acte for the Continuance and Explanation of the Statute made in the 39 yeere of our late Queene Elizabeth, intituled "An Acte for Punishmente of Rogues Vagaboundes and Sturdie Beggers." (Note: Vagabonds Act 1597 (39 Eliz. 1 c. 4)) (Repealed by Vagrants Act 1713 (13 Ann. c. 26))
Statute of Stabbing 1603 (repealed)	1 Jas. 1. c. 8; 2 Jas. 1. c. 8	7 July 1604
An Acte to take awaye the benefite of Clergie from some kinde of Manslaughter. (Repealed for England and Wales by Offences Against the Person Act 1828 (9 Geo. 4. c. 31) and for India by Criminal Law (India) Act 1828 (9 Geo. 4. c. 74))
Inns Act 1603 (repealed)	1 Jas. 1. c. 9; 2 Jas. 1. c. 9	7 July 1604
An Acte to restraine the inordinate hauntinge and tiplinge in Innes Ale houses and other Victuallinge Houses. (Repealed by Alehouse Act 1828 (9 Geo. 4. c. 61))
Officers of Courts Act 1603 (repealed)	1 Jas. 1. c. 10; 2 Jas. 1. c. 10	7 July 1604
An Acte for the better execution of Justice. (Repealed by Statute Law Revision Act 1863 (26 & 27 Vict. c. 125))
Bigamy Act 1603 (repealed)	1 Jas. 1. c. 11; 2 Jas. 1. c. 11	7 July 1604
An Acte to restrayne all persons from Marriage until theire former Wyves and former Husbandes be deade. (Repealed for England and Wales by Offences Against the Person Act 1828 (9 Geo. 4. c. 31) and for India by Criminal Law (India) Act 1828 (9 Geo. 4. c. 74))
Witchcraft Act 1603 or the Witchcraft Act 1604 (repealed)	1 Jas. 1. c. 12; 2 Jas. 1. c. 12	7 July 1604
An Acte against Conjuration Witchcrafte and dealinge with evill and wicked Spirits. (Repealed by Witchcraft Act 1735 (9 Geo. 2. c. 5))
Privilege of Parliament Act 1603 or the Parliamentary Privilege Act 1603	1 Jas. 1. c. 13; 2 Jas. 1. c. 13	7 July 1604
An Acte for new Executions to be sued againste any which shall hereafter be delivered out of Execution by Priviledge of Parliament, and for discharge of them out of whose Custody such persons shall be delivered.
City of London Court of Conscience Act 1603 (repealed)	1 Jas. 1. c. 14; 2 Jas. 1. c. 14	7 July 1604
An Acte for the Recoverie of Small Debtes, and releevinge of poor Debtors in London. (Repealed by City of London Court of Requests Act 1835 (5 & 6 Will. 4. c. xciv))
Bankrupts Act 1603 (repealed)	1 Jas. 1. c. 15; 2 Jas. 1. c. 15	7 July 1604
An Acte for the better Reliefe of the Creditors againste suche as shall become Bankrupts. (Repealed by Bankruptcy Act 1825 (6 Geo. 4. c. 16))
Thames Watermen Act 1603 (repealed)	1 Jas. 1. c. 16; 2 Jas. 1. c. 16	7 July 1604
An Acte concerninge Wherrymen and Watermen. (Repealed by Thames Watermen and Lightermen Act 1827 (7 & 8 Geo. 4. c. lxxv))
Hats Act 1603 (repealed)	1 Jas. 1. c. 17; 2 Jas. 1. c. 17	7 July 1604
An Acte for the better Execution of former Lawes touchinge the makinge of Hats and Felts, and for the more restrainte of unskilfull and deceivable workmanshippe therein used, to the wronge of all sortes of the People of this Realme. (Repealed by Manufacture of Hats Act 1776 (17 Geo. 3. c. 55))
Hops Act 1603 (repealed)	1 Jas. 1. c. 18; 2 Jas. 1. c. 18	7 July 1604
An Acte for avoydinge of deceiptfull sellinge buyinge or spendinge corrupte and unwholesome Hoppes. (Repealed by Statute Law Revision Act 1863 (26 & 27 Vict. c. 125))
Spices Act 1603 (repealed)	1 Jas. 1. c. 19; 2 Jas. 1. c. 19	7 July 1604
An Acte for the well garblinge of Spices. (Repealed by City of London (Garbling of Spices and Admission of Brokers) Act 1707 (6 Ann. c. 68))
Painting Act 1603 (repealed)	1 Jas. 1. c. 20; 2 Jas. 1. c. 20	7 July 1604
An Act for Redress of certain Abuses and Deceipts used in Paintinge. (Repealed by Repeal of Obsolete Statutes Act 1856 (19 & 20 Vict. c. 64))
Act Against Brokers 1603 (repealed)	1 Jas. 1. c. 21; 2 Jas. 1. c. 21	7 July 1604
An Acte againste Brokers. (Repealed by Sale of Goods Act 1893 (56 & 57 Vict. c. 71))
Leather Act 1603 (repealed)	1 Jas. 1. c. 22; 2 Jas. 1. c. 22	7 July 1604
An Acte concerning Tanners Curriers Shoomakers and other Arfificers occupyinge the cuttinge of Leather. (Repealed by Repeal of Acts Concerning Importation Act 1822 (3 Geo. 4. c. 41))
Fisheries Act 1603	1 Jas. 1. c. 23; 2 Jas. 1. c. 23	7 July 1604
An Acte for the better preservation of Fishinge in the Counties of Somersett Devon and Cornewall, and for the reliefe of Bakers Conders and Fishermen againste malicious Suites.
Sail Cloth Act 1603 (repealed)	1 Jas. 1. c. 24; 2 Jas. 1. c. 24	7 July 1604
An Acte againste the deceiptfull and false makinge of Mildernix and Powle Davies whereof Saile Clothes for the Navie and other Shippinge are made. (Repealed by Statute Law Revision Act 1863 (26 & 27 Vict. c. 125))
Continuance, etc. of Laws Act 1603 (repealed)	1 Jas. 1. c. 25; 2 Jas. 1. c. 25	7 July 1604
An Acte for continuynge and revivinge of divers Statutes and for repealinge of some others. (Repealed by Statute Law Revision Act 1863 (26 & 27 Vict. c. 125))
Exchequer Act 1603 (repealed)	1 Jas. 1. c. 26; 2 Jas. 1. c. 26	7 July 1604
An Acte for the continuance and due observation of certaine Orders for the Exchequer first set downe and established by virtue of a Privie Seale from the late Queene Elizabeth. (Repealed by Statute Law Revision Act 1863 (26 & 27 Vict. c. 125))
Game Act 1603 (repealed)	1 Jas. 1. c. 27; 2 Jas. 1. c. 27	7 July 1604
An Acte for the better execucion of thintent and meaning of former Statuts made againste shootinge in Gunnes and for the preservation of the Game of Pheasantes and Partridges and againste the destroyinge of Hares with Harepipes and tracinge Hares in the Snowe. (Repealed by Game Act 1831 (1 & 2 Will. 4. c. 32))
Berwick-on-Tweed Act 1603	1 Jas. 1. c. 28; 2 Jas. 1. c. 28	7 July 1604
An Acte for Confirmation of the Kinges Majesties Charter and Letters Patentes graunted to the Mayor Bayliffes and Burgesses of the Burroughe of Berwicke upon Twede and theire Successors, and of the Franchises Liberties Priviledges Jurisdictions and Customes of the saide Burroughe.
Increase of Seamen (Fish-days) Act 1603 (repealed)	1 Jas. 1. c. 29; 2 Jas. 1. c. 29	7 July 1604
An Acte to encourage the Seamen of England to take Fishe wherebie they may encrease to furnishe the Navie of England. (Repealed by Statute Law Revision Act 1863 (26 & 27 Vict. c. 125))
Melcombe Regis and Radipole, Dorset (Church) Act 1603 (repealed)	1 Jas. 1. c. 30; 2 Jas. 1. c. 30	7 July 1604
An Acte for the erectinge and buildinge of a Churche in Melcombe Regis to be the Parishe Churche of Radipoll; and for makinge the oulde Churche of Radipoll a Chappell belonginge to the same. (Repealed by Statute Law Revision Act 1948 (11 & 12 Geo. 6. c. 62))
Plague Act 1603 (repealed)	1 Jas. 1. c. 31; 2 Jas. 1. c. 31	7 July 1604
An Acte for the charitable Reliefe and Orderinge of persons infected with the Plague. (Repealed by Punishment of Offences Act 1837 (7 Will. 4 & 1 Vict. c. 91))
Dover Harbour Act 1603 (repealed)	1 Jas. 1. c. 32; 2 Jas. 1. c. 32	7 July 1604
An Acte for repaire of Dover Haven. (Repealed by Statute Law Revision Act 1948 (11 & 12 Geo. 6. c. 62))
Taxation Act 1603 (repealed)	1 Jas. 1. c. 33; 2 Jas. 1. c. 33	7 July 1604
An Acte for a Subsiedie of Tonnage and Poundage. (Repealed by Statute Law Revision Act 1863 (26 & 27 Vict. c. 125))

=== Private acts ===
Short title	Citation	Royal assent
Long title
Queen Anne's Jointure Act 1603	1 Jas. 1. c. 1 Pr.	7 July 1604
An Acte of Confirmation of the Jointure of the moste highe and mightie Princesse Anne Queene of England Scotland France and Ireland.
King's Household Expenses Act 1603	1 Jas. 1. c. 2 Pr.	7 July 1604
An Acte for an Assignment of certaine Sumes of Money for the defrayinge of the Charges of the Kinges most honorable Houshold.
Restitution of the Earl of Southampton Act 1603	1 Jas. 1. c. 3 Pr.	7 July 1604
An Act for restitution of Henry earl of Southampton.
Restitution of the Earl of Essex's Children Act 1603	1 Jas. 1. c. 4 Pr.	7 July 1604
An Act for the restitution of the son and two daughters of Robert late earl of Essex.
Restitution of the Earl of Arundel's Son Act 1603	1 Jas. 1. c. 5 Pr.	7 July 1604
An Act for the restitution of Thomas, only son of Philip late earl of Arundel.
Restitution of the Duke of Norfolk's Descendants Act 1603	1 Jas. 1. c. 6 Pr.	7 July 1604
An Act for the restitution in blood of William Howard, youngest son of Thomas late duke of Norfolk, and of the children of the lady Margaret Sackvile, daughter of the said duke.
Restitution of Lord Pagett's Son Act 1603	1 Jas. 1. c. 7 Pr.	7 July 1604
An Act for the restitution of William Pagett, only son of Thomas late lord Pagett.
Restitution of Thomas Lucas Act 1603	1 Jas. 1. c. 8 Pr.	7 July 1604
An Act for the restitution of Thomas Lucas, gentleman, in blood.
Securing Simpson's debt and the safety of the Warden of the Fleet in Sir Thomas Shirley's Case.	1 Jas. 1. c. 9 Pr. (Note: This act exists twice on the parliament roll (1 Jas. 1. cc. 9 Pr., 10 Pr.), with identical text.)	7 July 1604
An Act to secure Simpson's debt, and save harmless the warden of the fleet in Sir Thomas Sherley's case.
Securing the debt of Simpson and others and the safety of the Warden of the Fleet in Sir Thomas Shirley's Case.	1 Jas. 1. c. 10 Pr. (Note: This is the citation in The Statutes of the Realm.); 1 Jas. 1. c. 9 Pr. (Note: This is the citation in The Statutes at Large.)	7 July 1604
An Act to secure Simpson's debt, and save harmless the warden of the fleet in Sir Thomas Sherley's case.
Naturalization of Duke of Lennox and Children Act 1603	1 Jas. 1. c. 11 Pr. 1 Jas. 1. c. 10 Pr.	7 July 1604
An Act for the naturalizing of Lodovick duke of Lenox, Henry lord of Obiney, (Note: Seigneur d'Aubigny.) his brother, and their children.
Naturalization of the Countess of Nottingham Act 1603	1 Jas. 1. c. 12 Pr. 1 Jas. 1. c. 11 Pr.	7 July 1604
An Act for the naturalizing of the right honourable Margaret countess of Nottingham.
Naturalization of the Earl of Marre and Family Act 1603	1 Jas. 1. c. 13 Pr. 1 Jas. 1. c. 12 Pr.	7 July 1604
An Act for the naturalizing of John earl of Marre, his wife and children.
Naturalization of Sir George Howme and Family Act 1603	1 Jas. 1. c. 14 Pr. 1 Jas. 1. c. 13 Pr.	7 July 1604
An Act for the naturalizing of Sir George Howme, knight, lord treasurer of Scotland, his wife and children.
Confirmation of Sir George Howme's letters patent.	1 Jas. 1. c. 15 Pr. 1 Jas. 1. c. 14 Pr.	7 July 1604
An Act for confirmation of certain letters patents made to Sir George Howme, knight, lord treasurer of Scotland.
Naturalization of Sir Edward Bruce and confirmation of letters patent.	1 Jas. 1. c. 16 Pr. 1 Jas. 1. c. 15 Pr.	7 July 1604
An Act for the naturalizing of Sir Edward Bruce, knight, lord of Kinlosse, his wife and children, and for confirmation of letters patents made to him.
Naturalization of Sir Thomas Areskin and Family Act 1603	1 Jas. 1. c. 17 Pr. 1 Jas. 1. c. 16 Pr.	7 July 1604
An Act for the naturalizing of Sir Thomas Areskyn, knight, and Aleander Areskyn his son, and all other the children of the said Sir Thomas, born in the kingdom of Scotland, or wheresoever within the King's majesty's dominions.
Confirmation of letters patent to Earl of Nottingham, Earl of Suffolk, Sir John Leveson and Sir John Trevor, for use of Lady Cobham.	1 Jas. 1. c. 18 Pr. 1 Jas. 1. c. 17 Pr.	7 July 1604
An Act for confirmation of letters patents made to the right honourable Charles earl of Nottingham, lord admiral of England, Thomas earl of Suffolk, lord chamberlain of the King's houshold, Sir John Leveson, and Sir John Trevor, knights, for the use and benefit of the lady Frances dowager of Kildare, and now wife of Henry late lord Cobham, attainted.
Naturalization of Dame Marie Aston and Family Act 1603	1 Jas. 1. c. 19 Pr. 1 Jas. 1. c. 18 Pr.	7 July 1604
An Act for the naturalizing of dame Mary Aston, wife to Sir Roger Aston, knight, and their children.
Naturalization of Sir John Ramsey Act 1603	1 Jas. 1. c. 20 Pr. 1 Jas. 1. c. 19 Pr.	7 July 1604
An Act for the naturalizing of Sir John Ramsey, knight.
Naturalization of Sir James Hay Act 1603	1 Jas. 1. c. 21 Pr. 1 Jas. 1. c. 20 Pr.	7 July 1604
An Act for the naturalizing of Sir James Hay, knight.
Naturalization of John Gordon and Family Act 1603	1 Jas. 1. c. 22 Pr. 1 Jas. 1. c. 21 Pr.	7 July 1604
An Act for the naturalizing of John Gordon, dean of Sarum, his wife and children.
Naturalization of Sir John Kennedy Act 1603	1 Jas. 1. c. 23 Pr. 1 Jas. 1. c. 22 Pr.	7 July 1604
An Act for the naturalizing of John Kennedy, knight.
Naturalization of Sir John Drummond Act 1603	1 Jas. 1. c. 24 Pr. 1 Jas. 1. c. 23 Pr.	7 July 1604
An Act for the naturalizing of John Drumonde, knight.
Naturalization of Adam Newton Act 1603	1 Jas. 1. c. 25 Pr. 1 Jas. 1. c. 24 Pr.	7 July 1604
An Act for the naturalizing of Adam Newton, esquire.
Restitution in blood of Thomas Littleton, and Family Act 1603	1 Jas. 1. c. 26 Pr. 1 Jas. 1. c. 25 Pr.	7 July 1604
An Act for restitution in blood of Thomas Littleton, eldest son of John Littleton, late of Franckley in the county of Worcester, esquire, deceased, John Littleton, second son of the said John Littleton, deceased, and Edward Littleton, third son of the said John Littleton deceased, Bridget Littleton, eldest daughter of the said John Littleton deceased, Anne Littleton, second daughter of the said John Littleton deceased, and Jane Littleton, third daughter of the said John Littleton deceased.
Naturalization of William, Anne and Barbara Browne Act 1603	1 Jas. 1. c. 27 Pr. 1 Jas. 1. c. 26 Pr.	7 July 1604
An Act for the naturalizing of William Browne, Anne Browne, and Barbara Browne, children of Sir William Browne, knight, lieutenant-governor of his Majesty's cautionarie town of Ulishinge. (Note: The town of Flushing or Vlissingen in the Netherlands, one of the Cautionary Towns garrisoned by the English at this time under the Treaty of Nonsuch.)
Throckmorton's Estate Act 1603	1 Jas. 1. c. 28 Pr. 1 Jas. 1. c. 27 Pr.	7 July 1604
An Act for the enabling of Thomas Throgmorton, esquire, to make sale of certain lands for payment of his debts.
Naturalization of Thomas Glover, Margaret Mordant, Francis Collymore, Alexander Daniell, Nicholas Gilpine and Marie Copcote.	1 Jas. 1. c. 29 Pr. 1 Jas. 1. c. 28 Pr.	7 July 1604
An Act for the naturalizing of Thomas Glover, Margaret Mordant, Francis Collimore, Alexander Daniell, Nicolas Gilpine, and Mary Capcote.
Rowse's Estate Act 1603	1 Jas. 1. c. 30 Pr. 1 Jas. 1. c. 29 Pr.	7 July 1604
An Act for the sale of certain lands of Sir Thomas Rowse, knight, for the payment of his debts.
Rodney's Estate Act 1603	1 Jas. 1. c. 31 Pr. 1 Jas. 1. c. 30 Pr.	7 July 1604
An Act for the quiet establishing and settling of the lands and possessions late of Sir George Rodney, knight, deceased.
Assurance of lands to the Dean and Canons of Windsor, and of a lease of the prebend of Bedwin (Wiltshire) to the Earl of Hertford.	1 Jas. 1. c. 32 Pr. 1 Jas. 1. c. 31 Pr.	7 July 1604
An Act for the assuring of certain lands and tenements to the dean and canons of Windsor, and of assuring a lease of the prebend of Bedwin in the county of Wilts to Edward earl of Hertford.
Henry Jernegan's Estate Act 1603	1 Jas. 1. c. 33 Pr. 1 Jas. 1. c. 32 Pr.	7 July 1604
An Act for Henry Jernegan the younger, for the sale of the manor of Dages in Raveningham and Heringfleete alias St. Olaves in the counties of Norfolk and Suffolk, for the payment of his debts.
Mary Calthrop's Jointure Act 1603	1 Jas. 1. c. 34 Pr. 1 Jas. 1. c. 33 Pr.	7 July 1604
An Act for the jointure of the wife of Martin Calthrope, gentleman.
Relief of Thomas Lovell Act 1603	1 Jas. 1. c. 35 Pr. 1 Jas. 1. c. 34 Pr.	7 July 1604
An Act for the relief of Thomas Lovell, esquire.
Nevill's Estate Act 1603	1 Jas. 1. c. 36 Pr. 1 Jas. 1. c. 35 Pr.	7 July 1604
An Act for explanation of a former act made in the 43d year of the reign of the late Queen Elizabeth, intituled, "An Act for the enabling of Edward Nevile of Birling in the county of Kent, and Sir Henry Nevile, knight, his son and heir apparent, to dispose of certain copyhold lands, parcel of the manor of Rotherfield (Note: Rotherfield, East Sussex.) in the county of Sussex, and of the manors of Allesley (Note: Allesley, Warwickshire.) and Filonley (Note: Fillongley, Warwickshire.) in the county of Warwick." (Note: Nevills' Estate Act 1601 (43 Eliz. 1. c. 4 Pr.))
Tebold's Estate Act 1603	1 Jas. 1. c. 37 Pr. 1 Jas. 1. c. 36 Pr.	7 July 1604
An Act to enable John Tebols, gentleman, to make his wife a jointure of certain of his lands, and to sell some part for preferment of his younger children.
Naturalization of Katherine, Elizabeth, Susan, Hester and Marie Vincents.	1 Jas. 1. c. 38 Pr. 1 Jas. 1. c. 37 Pr.	7 July 1604
An Act for the naturalizing of Katherine Vincent, Elizabeth Vincent, Susanna Vincent, Hester Vincent, and Mary Vincent.
Naturalization of Victor Chauntrell, Peter Martin, Mentia Van Ursell and Sabina, Edward and Peregrine Aldrich.	1 Jas. 1. c. 39 Pr. 1 Jas. 1. c. 38 Pr.	7 July 1604
An Act for the naturalizing of Victor Chauntrel, Peter Martin, Mentia Van Urzell, wife of George Aldriche, esquire, Sabina Aldriche, Edward, and Peregrine Aldriche, her children.

=== Sources ===
- Raithby, John, ed. (1963) [1819]. "1° Jac.". Statutes of the Realm. Vol. 4 Part 2: The Statutes of Queen Elizabeth (An. 28-43) and of King James (1586–1623). London: Dawsons. pp. 1015–1064 – via HathiTrust.
- Raithby, John, ed. (1963) [1819]. "1° Jac.". Statutes of the Realm. Vol. 4 Part 2: The Statutes of Queen Elizabeth (An. 28-43) and of King James (1586–1623). London: Dawsons. p. 1015-1064 – via Google Books.
- Raithby, John, ed. (1963) [1819]. "1° Jac.". Statutes of the Realm. Vol. 4 Part 2: The Statutes of Queen Elizabeth (An. 28-43) and of King James (1586–1623). London: Dawsons. p. 1015-1064 – via Internet Archive.
- Pickering, Danby, ed. (1763). "Anno secundo [vulgo primo] Jacobi". The Statutes at Large. Vol. 7: From the Thirty-ninth Year of Q. Elizabeth to the Twelfth Year of K. Charles. Inclusive. Cambridge: Joseph Bentham. pp. 73–145 – via Internet Archive.
- Journal of the House of Commons. Vol. 1 – 1547-1629. His Majesty's Stationery Office. 1802 – via British History Online.
- Journal of the House of Lords. Vol. 2: 1578-1614. London: His Majesty's Stationery Office. 1830 – via British History Online.
- Chronological Table of and Index to the Statutes. Vol. 1: To the End of the Session 59 Vict. Sess. 2 (1895) (13th ed.). London: Her Majesty's Stationery Office. 1896. pp. 64–65 – via Google Books.
- Chronological Table of the Statutes: Covering the Period from 1235 to the End of 1971. London: Her Majesty's Stationery Office. 1972. p. 62. ISBN 978-0-11-840096-1 – via Google Books.
- "Acts of the English Parliament from 1603". legislation.gov.uk. The National Archives.
- "Chronological Tables of the Private and Personal Acts: Part 2 (1603–1640)". legislation.gov.uk. The National Archives.

== See also ==
- List of acts of the Parliament of England
