= William Strode (disambiguation) =

- William Strode (1598–1645), son of William Strode (1562–1637), was an English politician and MP, and one of the "Five Members".

William Strode may also refer to:

- William Strode (1562–1637), of Newnham, Devon, English landowner, military engineer and MP 1597–1626
- William Strode (of Barrington) (1589–1666), English Parliamentarian officer and MP for Ilchester 1640, 1646
- William Strode (poet) (c.1602 – 1645), English poet
- William Strode (1614–1676), of Newnham, Devon, English landowner and MP (1660–1676)
- William Strode (died 1755), English MP for Reading
- William Strode (1738–1809), English MP for Yarmouth, son of William Strode (died 1755)
- William Strode (British Army officer) (1698–1776), Colonel in Chief of the Wiltshire Regiment
- William Strode III (of Barrington) (1622–1694), MP for Ilchester 1679, son of William Strode (of Barrington)
- Bill Strode (William Hall Strode III, 1937–2006), American photographer
