= Succession to the Crown Act 1603 =

Act of the Parliament of England

- Act of Parliament
- Parliament of England
- Long title: A most joyful and just recognition of the immediate, lawful and undoubted Succession, Descent and Right of the Crown.
- Citation: 1 Jas. 1. c. 1
- Territorial extent: England and Wales

Dates
- Royal assent: 7 July 1604
- Commencement: 19 March 1604 (Note: Start of session.)
- Repealed: 30 July 1948

Other legislation
- Repealed by: Statute Law Revision Act 1948

Status: Repealed

Text of statute as originally enacted

The Succession to the Crown Act 1603 (1 Jas. 1. c. 1), full title A most joyful and just recognition of the immediate, lawful and undoubted Succession, Descent and Right of the Crown, was an act of the Parliament of England enacted during the reign of James I. The act recited the loyalty of Parliament to James, and stated that the English crown, on the death of Elizabeth I, had come to him "by inherent birthright and lawful and undoubted succession", and acknowledged him as the legitimate king "of England, Scotland, France and Ireland".

== Subsequent developments ==
The whole act was repealed by section 1 of, and the first schedule to, the Statute Law Revision Act 1948 (11 & 12 Geo. 6. c. 62), which came into force on 30 July 1948.

== See also ==
- Succession to the British throne
