= List of acts of the Parliament of England from 1512 =

This is a list of acts of the Parliament of England for the year 1512.

For acts passed during the period 1707–1800, see the list of acts of the Parliament of Great Britain. See also the list of acts of the Parliament of Scotland, and the list of acts of the Parliament of Ireland.

For acts passed from 1801 onwards, see the list of acts of the Parliament of the United Kingdom. For acts of the devolved parliaments and assemblies in the United Kingdom, see the list of acts of the Scottish Parliament, the list of acts of the Northern Ireland Assembly, and the list of acts and measures of Senedd Cymru; see also the list of acts of the Parliament of Northern Ireland.

For medieval statutes, etc. that are not considered to be acts of Parliament, see the list of English statutes.

See also the List of ordinances and acts of the Parliament of England, 1642–1660 for ordinances and acts passed by the Long Parliament and other bodies without royal assent, and which were not considered to be valid legislation following the Restoration in 1660.

The number shown after each act's title is its chapter number. Acts are cited using this number, preceded by the years of the reign during which the relevant parliamentary session was held; thus the Union with Ireland Act 1800 is cited as "39 & 40 Geo. 3. c. 67", meaning the 67th act passed during the session that started in the 39th year of the reign of George III and which finished in the 40th year of that reign. The modern convention is to use Arabic numerals in citations (thus "41 Geo. 3" rather than "41 Geo. III"). Acts of the last session of the Parliament of Great Britain and the first session of the Parliament of the United Kingdom are both cited as "41 Geo. 3".

Acts passed by the Parliament of England did not have a short title; however, some of these acts have subsequently been given a short title by acts of the Parliament of the United Kingdom, such as the Short Titles Act 1896 (59 & 60 Vict. c. 14).

Acts passed by the Parliament of England were deemed to have come into effect on the first day of the session in which they were passed. Because of this, the years given in the list below may in fact be the year before a particular act was passed.

== 4 Hen. 8 ==
The second session of the 2nd Parliament of King Henry VIII, which met from 4 November 1512 until 20 December 1512.

This session was also traditionally cited as 4 H. 8.

Note that cc. 9–17, 19, and 20 were traditionally cited as private acts cc. 1–9, 10, and 11 respectively, and that c. 18 was not traditionally included in printed collections of acts.

Short title	Citation	Royal assent
Long title
Bulwarks on the Coast Act 1512 (repealed)	4 Hen. 8. c. 1	20 December 1512
An Act concerning the making of Bulwarks by the Sea. (Repealed by Statute Law Revision Act 1863 (26 & 27 Vict. c. 125))
Murders and Felonies Act 1512 (repealed)	4 Hen. 8. c. 2	20 December 1512
For Murder and Felony. (Repealed by Statute Law Revision Act 1863 (26 & 27 Vict. c. 125))
Juries in London Act 1512 (repealed)	4 Hen. 8. c. 3	20 December 1512
The Act concerning Juries in London. (Repealed by Statute Law Revision Act 1863 (26 & 27 Vict. c. 125))
Outlawry Act 1512 (repealed)	4 Hen. 8. c. 4	20 December 1512
For Proclamations to be made before Exigents be awarded. (Repealed by Statute Law Revision Act 1863 (26 & 27 Vict. c. 125))
Wages of Labourers, etc. Act 1512 (repealed)	4 Hen. 8. c. 5	20 December 1512
The Act repealing Penalties for giving of Wages to Labourers and Artificers. (Repealed by Statute Law Revision Act 1863 (26 & 27 Vict. c. 125))
Sealing of Cloths Act 1512 (repealed)	4 Hen. 8. c. 6	20 December 1512
The Act for sealing of Cloths of Gold and Silk. (Repealed by Statute Law Revision Act 1863 (26 & 27 Vict. c. 125))
Pewterers Act 1512 (repealed)	4 Hen. 8. c. 7	20 December 1512
The Act made for Pewterers, and true Weights and Beams. (Repealed by Repeal of Obsolete Statutes Act 1856 (19 & 20 Vict. c. 64))
Privilege of Parliament Act 1512 or the Parliamentary Privilege Act 1512 or Strode's Act	4 Hen. 8. c. 8	20 December 1512
The Act concerning Richard Strode, for Matters reasoned in the Parliament.
Restitution of Earl of Devon Act 1512 (repealed)	4 Hen. 8. c. 9 (Note: This is the citation in The Statutes of the Realm.); 4 Hen. 8. c. 1 Pr. (Note: This is the citation in The Statutes at Large.)	20 December 1512
An Acte of restitucion for the Erle of Devon. (Repealed by Statute Law (Repeals) Act 1977 (c. 18))
Grant to Earl and Countess of Devon Act 1512 (repealed)	4 Hen. 8. c. 10; 4 Hen. 8. c. 2 Pr.	20 December 1512
An Act for confirmation of an indenture made between the King on one part, and William Courtney late earl of Devon, and the lady Katherine his wife, on the other part. (Repealed by Statute Law (Repeals) Act 1978 (c. 45))
Countess of Devon and Hugh Conway Act 1512 (repealed)	4 Hen. 8. c. 11; 4 Hen. 8. c. 3 Pr.	20 December 1512
This is the Acte of Covenantes byten the Countes of Devon and Sir High Conway. (Repealed by Statute Law (Repeals) Act 1978 (c. 45))
Countess of Devon and William Knyvet Act 1512 (repealed)	4 Hen. 8. c. 12; 4 Hen. 8. c. 4 Pr.	20 December 1512
This is the Acte of Couvenantes between the Countes of Devon and Sir William Knyvet. (Repealed by Statute Law (Repeals) Act 1978 (c. 45))
Estates of Earl of Surrey Act 1512 (repealed)	4 Hen. 8. c. 13; 4 Hen. 8. c. 5 Pr.	20 December 1512
An Act for the assuring of certain lands to the earl of Surrey. (Repealed by Statute Law (Repeals) Act 1978 (c. 45))
Restitution of John and Thomas Wyndham Act 1512 (repealed)	4 Hen. 8. c. 14; 4 Hen. 8. c. 6 Pr.	20 December 1512
An Act of restitution of Thomas Wyndham son of Sir John Wyndham. (Repealed by Statute Law (Repeals) Act 1977 (c. 18))
Restitution of Thomas Empson Act 1512 (repealed)	4 Hen. 8. c. 15; 4 Hen. 8. c. 7 Pr.	20 December 1512
An Act of restitution for Thomas Empson, son of Sir Richard Empson. (Repealed by Statute Law (Repeals) Act 1977 (c. 18))
Restitution of William Baskerville Act 1512 (repealed)	4 Hen. 8. c. 16; 4 Hen. 8. c. 8 Pr. (Note: This act was not included in The Statutes at Large.)	20 December 1512
An Act of restitution for William Baskervile. (Repealed by Statute Law (Repeals) Act 1977 (c. 18))
Expenses of King's Wardrobe Act 1512 (repealed)	4 Hen. 8. c. 17; 4 Hen. 8. c. 9 Pr.	20 December 1512
Pro Magna Garderoba Regis. (Repealed by Statute Law Revision Act 1863 (26 & 27 Vict. c. 125))
Surveyors of Crown Lands, etc. Act 1512 (repealed)	4 Hen. 8. c. 18	20 December 1512
This is the Acte of Auctorite geven to Sir Roƀt Suthwell for surveynge and approvynge the Kinges landes. (Repealed by Statute Law Revision Act 1863 (26 & 27 Vict. c. 125))
Taxation Act 1512 (repealed)	4 Hen. 8. c. 19; 4 Hen. 8. c. 10 Pr.	20 December 1512
An Act for granting a subsidy to the King. (Repealed by Statute Law Revision Act 1863 (26 & 27 Vict. c. 125))
Protection for John Skelton Sheriff of Cumberland Act 1512 or the Fortification of Plymouth Act 1512 (repealed)	4 Hen. 8. c. 20; 4 Hen. 8. c. 11 Pr.	20 December 1512
Pro Johanne Skelton. (Repealed by Statute Law Revision Act 1948 (11 & 12 Geo. 6. c. 62))

=== Sources ===
- "4° Hen. VIII". The Statutes of the Realm. Vol. 3: 1509 to 1547. pp. 48–91 – via HathiTrust.
- "4° Hen. VIII". The Statutes of the Realm. Vol. 3: 1509 to 1547. pp. 48–91 – via Google Books.
- "Anno quarto Henrici VIII". The Statutes at Large. Vol. 4 - 1 Richard III to 31 Henry VIII - 1483-4 to 1539. pp. 119–129 – via Internet Archive.
- "Anno quarto Henrici VIII". The Statutes at Large. Vol. 4 - 1 Richard III to 31 Henry VIII - 1483-4 to 1539. pp. 119–129 – via Internet Archive.
- "Anno quarto Henrici VIII". The Statutes at Large. Vol. 4 - 1 Richard III to 31 Henry VIII - 1483-4 to 1539. pp. 119–129 – via Internet Archive.
- Journal of the House of Lords. Vol. 1: 1509-1577. London: His Majesty's Stationery Office. 1830 – via British History Online.
- Chronological Table of and Index to the Statutes. Vol. 1: To the End of the Session 59 Vict. Sess. 2 (1895) (13th ed.). London: Her Majesty's Stationery Office. 1896. p. 44 – via Google Books.
- Chronological Table of the Statutes: Covering the Period from 1235 to the End of 1971. London: Her Majesty's Stationery Office. 1972. p. 39. ISBN 978-0-11-840096-1 – via Google Books.
- "Acts of the English Parliament from 1512". legislation.gov.uk. The National Archives.

== See also ==
- List of acts of the Parliament of England
