= Strode House =

Coordinates: 33°11′9.65″N 87°30′2.78″W

- Location: 49 Cherokee Road, Tuscaloosa, Alabama

The Strode Mansion is the former residence of Hudson Strode. The residence includes the main house, a small caretaker's cabin, and a separate writing studio, as well as 27 acres (110,000 m^{2}) of woodland. The Strodes bequeathed their residence to the University of Alabama's Department of English. The property is located at 49 Cherokee Road, Tuscaloosa, Alabama.

The home was designated a historic landmark by the Alabama Historical Association in 1987. These days, it is usually occupied by the director of the Hudson Strode Program in Renaissance Studies. In the past, it was assigned to notable visiting faculty.

The caretaker's cabin ("Strode's Cabin") is occupied by a student from the university's Master of Fine Arts program.

== Notable occupants ==
One notable occupant was writer and teacher Richard Yates, a chain-smoker notorious for the way he "trashed the Strode House" with his four-pack a day habit.
