= Cornish Stannary Parliament =

1201–1753 tin-mining legislature in Cornwall, England

The Cornish Stannary Parliament (officially The Convocation of the Tinners of Cornwall) was the representative body of the Cornish stannaries, which were chartered in 1201 by King John. Due to the significant proportion of Cornwall's population involved in the tin trade, it wielded considerable power until it ceased to meet in September 1753.

== History ==
=== Background ===
The stannaries are said to have first been acknowledged by the Crown in 1198, but formal recognition came with a 1201 charter from King John which affirmed the ancient rights tinners (those involved in mining tin) enjoyed. The charter exempted tinners from common taxes (though the stannaries had their own tax system) and made the Lord Warden of the Stannaries the sole magistrate with jurisdiction over them. Tinners were also protected from being called up to provide labour to local lords of the manor while they were working in the tin industry.

=== Parliament ===
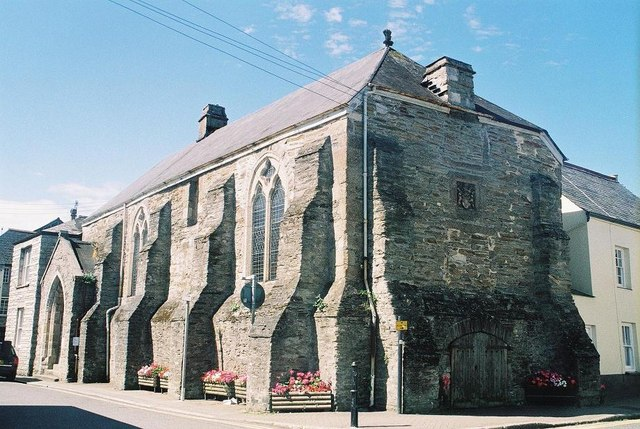
The building in Lostwithiel which was used for the Parliament (though it has since been modified)

A Cornish Stannary Parliament building was built at Lostwithiel in 1305. The suspension of the Stannary Parliament and curtailing of tinners' tax exemption rights in 1496 is seen to be one of the factors in the 1497 Cornish rebellion.

The Stannary Parliament met at Lostwithiel and Truro throughout its existence. Being the seat of the Parliament is credited as one of the factors that caused Truro to become a "significant administrative centre".

According to Thomas Pitt, no Stannary Parliament sat between 1710 and 1750, though efforts had been made from 1744 to try to get the Parliament recalled. The last session of the Stannary Parliament convened in Truro in 1752, being adjourned in September 1753.

Because the Stannary charters have never been revoked, some argue that the powers and rights of the Stannary Parliaments are still extant.

== Procedure and powers ==
Members of the Stannary Parliament were called stannators. The 24 stannators, six from each of the four Cornish stannaries (Tywarnhaile, Blackmoor, Foweymoore and Penwith), had the power to pass laws which had effect over the whole of Cornwall in the same way as an Act of Parliament.

The Parliament was summoned by the Duke of Cornwall and the Lord Warden of the Stannaries issued notices to each of the stannary towns (Truro, Lostwithiel, Helston and Launceston) ordering elections for six stannators from each. At the opening of the Parliament the Lord Warden would make a speech, oversee the election of a speaker, and then be excluded. 24 assistants were appointed to help with the drafting of legislation, forming an informal lower house.

The Stannary Parliament also held the power of veto over Westminster laws that affected the stannaries; to become law, a bill which affected mining needed the approval of every stannator, the Lord Warden, and the Duke of Cornwall. From 1752, bills from the Stannary Parliament needed the assent of sixteen members of the Westminster Parliament but as Cornwall was hugely overrepresented in the unreformed House of Commons, (Note: At times, Cornwall had a similar number of MPs as the whole of Scotland due to royal influence.) this was less of a burden than it would be today.

== See also ==
- Revived Cornish Stannary Parliament
- Stannary Convocation of Devon
- Duchy of Cornwall
- Stannary law
