= Bill Strode =

American photographer

- Born: August 6, 1937; Louisville, Kentucky, US
- Died: May 15, 2006 (aged 68); Versailles, Kentucky, US
- Style: photojournalism environmental photography
- Awards: two shared Pulitzer Prizes (1967 and 1976); Photographer of the Year (1966)

William Hall Strode III (August 6, 1937 in Louisville, Kentucky – May 15, 2006) was an American photographer.

In 1966, the Pictures of the Year Competition hosted by the University of Missouri and the National Press Photographers Association (NPAA) named Strode Photographer of the Year. He was president of the NPAA in 1974. His work for The Courier-Journal earned him two shared Pulitzer Prizes (1967 and 1976). In 1976, he left the Courier-Journal to work as a freelancer. His clients included National Geographic, Time, Life, Sports Illustrated, Esquire, The New York Times, and The Washington Post. He published photographic folios of college campuses, including Washington and Lee University (1983), the University of the South (1984), Rhodes College (1985), and the University of Notre Dame (1988). Strode also worked as a photographer for the Environmental Protection Agency's Documerica project in the early 1970s.

Strode's photos have been exhibited at the Smithsonian Institution, the Corcoran Gallery of Art, the Museum of Modern Art, and the Speed Art Museum.

Bill Strode died of cancer on May 15, 2006, in Versailles, Kentucky, at the age of 68.
