= Privilege of Parliament Act 1512 =

Act of the Parliament of England

Privilege of Parliament Act 1512 (Note: The citation of this act by this short title was authorised by section 5 of, and the second schedule to, the Statute Law Revision Act 1948. Due to the repeal of those provisions, it is now authorised by section 19(2) of the Interpretation Act 1978.)
- Act of Parliament
- Parliament of England
- Long title: Pro Ricardo Strode. (Note: These words are printed against this act in the second column of the second schedule to the Statute Law Revision Act 1948, which is headed "Title".)
- Citation: 4 Hen. 8. c. 8
- Territorial extent: England and Wales

Dates
- Royal assent: 20 December 1512
- Commencement: 4 November 1512 (Note: Start of session.)
Other legislation
Amended by	Statute Law Revision Act 1888
Relates to	Privilege of Parliament Act 1603

Status: Amended

Text of statute as originally enacted

Revised text of statute as amended

Text of the Privilege of Parliament Act 1512 as in force today (including any amendments) within the United Kingdom, from legislation.gov.uk.

The Privilege of Parliament Act 1512 or the Parliamentary Privilege Act 1512 (4 Hen. 8. c. 8), commonly known as Strode's Act, is an act of the Parliament of England. It enacted parliamentary privilege in law, prohibiting any suit or prosecution from being brought or punishment being imposed against any MP or peer for speaking on any matter in parliament.

The act was originally a private act, passed in response to Strode's case, in which Strode had been imprisoned for obstructing tin mining, namely by introducing a bill for improving the working conditions of tin miners. In 1667, Parliament declared it to be of more general application. The privilege was later strengthened and generalised by the Bill of Rights 1689.

The act was retained for the Republic of Ireland by section 2(2)(a) of, and part 2 of schedule 1 to, the Statute Law Revision Act 2007.

== Text of act ==
=== Section 1 ===
Bills brought into Parliament by Ric. Strode, to regulate the Tinners. Consequent Recovery of Penalties against Strode in Stannary Courts, as for breach of an Act of the Parliament of Tinners at Crockerentor. Imprisonment of Strode in execution thereon; Further Duress of Imprisonment. Bond by Strode to be relieved therefrom. The said Judgment, Execution, & Bond declared void.

Lamentably compleyneth and shewith unto your most discrete wisdoms in this present parliament assembled Richard Strode Gentilman of the Countie of Devonshire one of the Burgesses of this honorable House for the Burgh of Plympton in the Countie foresaid; That where the said Richard conducended and greed with other of this house to putte forth certeyn bylles in this present parliament ageynst certeyn persones named Tynners in the Countie foreseid for the reformacion of the perysshyng hurtyng and distroyng of dyvers Portis Havyns and Crekys and oder billys for the comen wele of the said Countie the which here in this high Couurte of Parliament shuld and ought to be commendd and treated of; And for by cause the said Richard is a Tynner for the causes and maters afore rehersed one John Fursse Tynner Understeward of the Steyinary in the said Countie in and at fower courtes of the said Steinary at dyvers placis and tymes before hym severally holden in the said Countie he and other hath condempned the said Richard in the Summe of £160 that is to wit at every Courte £40 and that by the Procurement of the said John Fursse at the seid iiij severall Courtes and lawdays in the said Steinary by hym holden in this maner pupplysshed and seid, that the seid Richard at the last parliament holden at Westminster wold avoyded and utterly destroyed all liberties pryvylegys and fraunches concernyng the Steyinary by reason wherof the said Richard uppon fower bylles hadde and made therof by the said John Fursse and other caused that the saide Richard was presented and founde gilte of the premysses in every of the said Courtes in £40 to be lost and forfeyt by hym, by reason of an Acte and Ordynaunce by Tynners made and hadde at a place in the said Countie called Crockerentor the tenour of whiche Acte apperith in a Sedule to this Bill annexed, to the which the said Richard was never warned nor called to make answere to the premysses contrary to all lawes right reason and good conscience: And for the execucion of the same one John a Gwyllam, upon a sourmyse by hym made to the Kyngges Highnes of the said condempnacion to be to his Grace forfeyte therof, atteyned a byll assigned of £20 parcell of the said £160 to be to hym graunted by the seid Kyngges Highnes; Wheruppon the seid John a Gwyllam and other caused the said Richard was taken and imprisoned in a doungen and a depe pytt under grounde in the Castell of Lidford in the said Countie, and there and elswhere remayned by the space of thre wekys and more unto such tyme he was delyvered by a Wrete of Privilege out of the Kyngges Eschequer at Westminster, for that he was one of the Collectours in the said Countie for the first of the twoo quyndezims graunted at and in this present parliament; the which prison is oon of the most anoyous contagious and detestablest place withyn this Realme, so that by reason of the same imprisonament he was putt in greate jepardie and perill of his lyff; And the said Richard so beyng yn prison and the said John a Gwillam seyng the same cruell imprisonament of the said Richard intreated and instantly desyred one Philippe Fursse then beyng Keper of the said Prisone streytly to kepe the said Richard in prison and to putte irons uppon hym to his more gretter payne and jopardie and to geve hym but bredde and water oonly, to the entente to cause the said Richard to be fayn to contente and pay hym the said £20 and for the same promysed the seid keper fower markes of Money, for the which iiij marcs the said Richard for to be yeased of his irons and paynfull imprisonament aforesaid for savegard of his liff promysed and graunted to pay to the said keper iiij marcs wherof he payed to the said keper in hande xiij s. iiij d. And over that the said Richard for to be eased of his said paynfull imprisonament was also of necessitie dryven to be bounden to Thomas Denys deputie unto Sir Henry Marney Knyght Wardeyn of the said Steinary in an Obligacion of the Summe of £100 uppon condicion wherof parte is as herafter folowith, that is to say, that if the above bounden Richarde Strode defende and save harmeles the said Thomas Denys and to use hym self as a true prisoner duryng the tyme it shall please the Kyng to have hym prisoner in the Castell of Lidford, and also to do no thyng wherby he shall in the lawe be demed out of Prison, and other articles comprised in the said condicion the which the said Richard perfetly rememberith not; Wherefore the premysses by your greate wisedoms tenderly considered the said Richard humbly prayth that it may be ordeyned establisshed and inactled by the Kyng our Sovereigne Lord and by the Lordes spirituall and temporall and the Comens in this present parliament assembled and by auctoritie of the same that the said condempnacion and condempnacions of the said £160 and every parcell therof and jugementes and execucions had or to be hadde for the same, and also the said obligacion and all demaundes had or to be hadde for the premisses or any of theym to be utterly voyde ageynst the said Richard and of none effecte.

=== Section 2 ===
The words from "ov that" to "auctoritie", wherever those words occurred in this section, were repealed by section 1(1) of, and part I of the schedule to, the Statute Law Revision Act 1888 (51 & 52 Vict. c. 3).

Suits against any for Bills or Speeches &c. in Parliament declared void. Action on the Case given to the Party grieved: Treble Damages, &c. Schedule, above referred to.

And that sutes accusementes condempnacions execucions fynes amerciamentes punysshmentes correccions greviances charges and imposicions putte or had or here after to be put or hadde unto or uppon the said Richard and to every other of the person or persons afore specified, that nowe be of this present parliament or that of any Parliament herafter shalbe for any bill spekyng reasonyng or declaryng of any mater or maters concernyng the parliament to be commened and treated of, be utterly voyd and of none effecte. And that if the said Richard Strode or any of all the said oder person or persons here after be vexed trobeled or other wise charged for any causes as is aforseid, that then he or they and every of theym so vexed or troubeled of and for the same to have accion uppon the case ageynst every such person and persons so vexyng or troubelyng any contrarie to this ordynaunce and provysion, in the which accion the partie greved shall recover trebyll damages and costes, Be it inquyred for our Sovereyng Lord the Kyng that where as at the Parliament holden at Crockerentor before Thomas Denys deputie to Sir Henry Marney Knyght Wardeyn of the Steinary the xxiiij day of Septembre the second yere of the reigne of Kyng Henry the viijth it was ordeyned establisshed and enacted that frome the day aforsaid it shalbe lawfull for every man to dygge Tyn within the Countie of Devonshire in all placis where as Tyn may be founde; And also to cary the Water to ther Werkes without any lette or trouble of any person or persones accordyng to our usages and confirmacion and our chartour and accordyng to our Custome out of mynde: And if any person or persons let troble or vex any man to digge Tyn or to cary Water for the same contrarie to our olde custome and usage and if it be founde by verdyt of xij men at the Lawday, he that so lettyth vexeth or troubleth any such person or persons shall fall in the penaltie of £40 as ought as he so vexeth or troubleth the one halfe to my Lord Prince and the other halfe to hym that was so letted vexed or troubled, And a fieri facias to be warded as well for my Lord Prince as for the partie, if one Richard Strode of Plympton Tynner at the Parliament holden at Westmynster the iiijth day of Februarie last past letted vexed or troubled one William Rede the yongger and Elys Elford Tynners and all other Tynners in the same parliament for dyggyng of Tyn in the severall Soyle of the said Richard and other persons contrarie to this our Acte made.
