= Stannary law =

Tin mining law in Cornwall and Devon, England

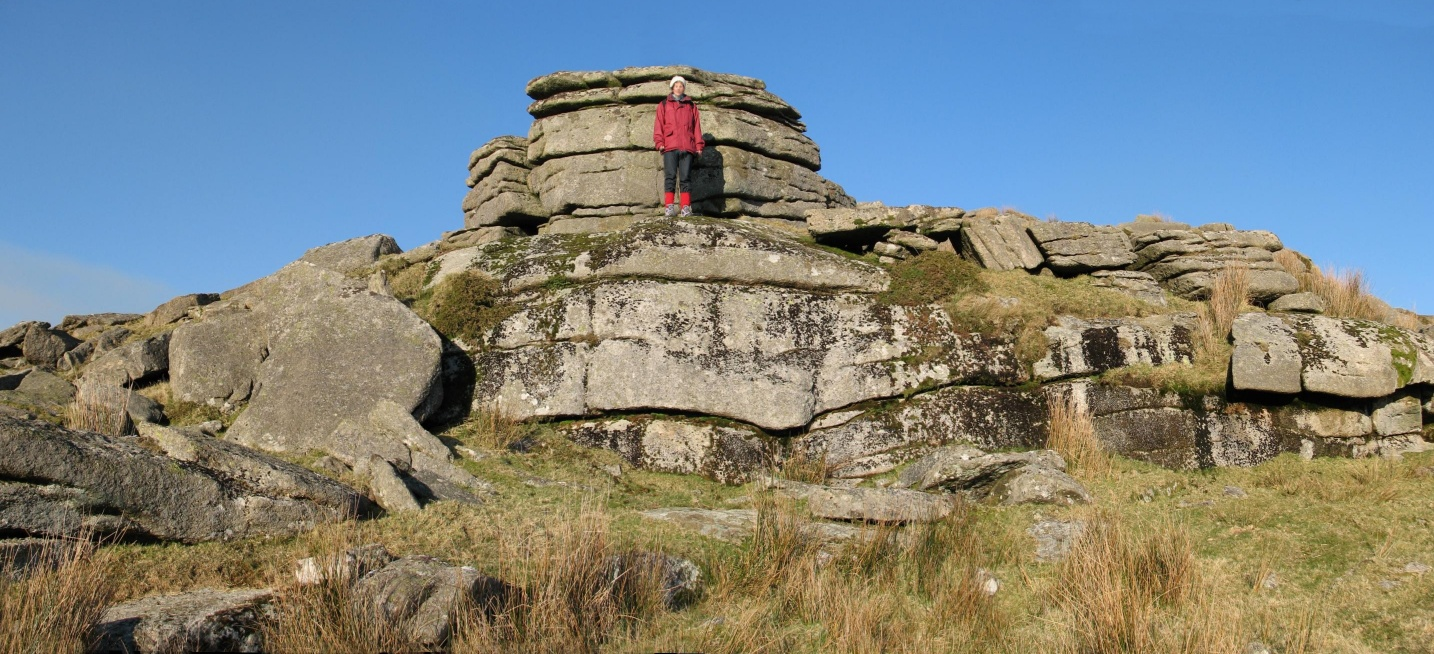
Crockern Tor, the meeting place of the Stannary Convocation of Devon

Stannary law (derived from the Latin: stannum for tin) is the body of English law that governs tin mining in Cornwall and Devon; although no longer of much practical relevance, the stannary law remains part of the law of the United Kingdom and is arguably the oldest law incorporated into the English legal system.

The stannary law's complexity and comprehensive reach into the lives of tin miners necessitated the existence of the legislative Stannary Convocations of Devon and Cornwall, the judicial Courts of the Vice-Warden of the Stannaries, and the executive Lord Warden of the Stannaries. The separate and powerful government institutions available to the tin miners reflected the enormous importance of the tin industry to the English economy during the Middle Ages. Special laws for tin miners pre-date written legal codes in Britain, and ancient traditions exempted everyone connected with tin mining in Cornwall and Devon from any jurisdiction other than the stannary courts in all but the most exceptional circumstances.

== Stannary Convocation of Devon ==
Edward I's 1305 Stannary Charter established Tavistock, Ashburton and Chagford as Devon's stannaries, with a monopoly on all tin mining in Devon, a right to representation in the Stannary Parliament and a right to the jurisdiction of the stannary courts. Plympton became the fourth Devon stannary town in 1307.

The parliament consisted of ninety-six jurates, with twenty-four being chosen by each of the four Devon stannaries. The jurates were chosen at special courts held in each stannary by "tinners": a term broad enough to include not just miners and tin work owners, but others concerned with the tin industry. The Parliament usually met in an open air forum at Crockern Tor. The last convocation of the Devon Parliament was in 1786, but as late as the 1980s, an honorary stannator would be named whenever a new tin mine was opened.

== Cornish Stannary Parliament ==
A charter of King John had given the tin miners of Cornwall certain legal rights which were confirmed by King Edward I in 1305. They had the rights of "bounding" (prospecting for and working tin ore deposits), of trial before their own stannary court, and of exemption from ordinary taxation. The stannaries were: Foweymore (district of Bodmin Moor), Blackmore (district of St Austell); Tywarnhayle (district of St Agnes and Carn Brea); and Kerrier and Penwith (district between Godolphin and Land's End). The courts were normally held every three weeks and presided over by the steward who had been appointed by the warden of the stannaries. As there are no extant records before the 16th century the court procedure is unknown; if tinners were compelled to appear before another court they could insist that half the jury be tinners.

The privileges of the stannaries of Cornwall were confirmed by Edward III on the creation of the Duchy of Cornwall in 1337. This confirmed that the tin miners were exempt from all civil jurisdiction other than that of the Stannary Courts, except in cases affecting land, life or limb. There was at this period no definition of the districts of each stannary.

The Cornish stannaries were suspended in 1496, the year before the Cornish Rebellion of 1497. Henry VII restored them in return for a payment from the tin miners of the sum, enormous at the time, of £1,000, to support his war on Scotland. In addition to restoring the stannaries and pardoning the people who participated in the rebellion, Henry's Charter of Pardon, 1508 provided that no new laws affecting miners should be enacted without the consent of 24 stannators, six being chosen from each of the four stannaries:

- Foymore (or Foweymore): chosen by the mayor and corporation of Lostwithiel
- Blackmore: by the mayor and corporation of Launceston (Note: The Blackmore Stannary, centred at Hensbarrow Beacon, kept its records stored in the church of Luxulyan.)
- Tywarnhaile (or Tynwarnhail): by the mayor and corporation of Truro
- Penwith and Kerrier: by the mayor and corporation of Helston

The stannators were described in 1831 as being "some of the principal gentlemen of the mining district". On assembly the stannators elected a speaker, the meeting being termed a Stannary Parliament. The parliaments were convened occasionally by the Lord Warden of the Stannaries when it was felt that laws concerning the miner's rights needed to be made or revised.

The Cornish Stannary Parliament last assembled at Truro in 1752, and continued until 11 September 1753. In 1977, responding by letter to a written question in the House of Commons from Plaid Cymru MP Dafydd Wigley to the Attorney General for England and Wales, Lord Chancellor Lord Elwyn-Jones said he could find no record of the charter having been formally amended or withdrawn but also noted academic opinion that "no doubt has ever been expressed about Parliament's power to enact legislation for the stannaries without the need to obtain the consent of Convocation". (Note: In 1978 Dafydd Wigley deposited his papers regarding this in the National Library of Wales, Aberystwyth.)

In March 2007, Bridget Prentice, Parliamentary Under-Secretary of State in the Ministry of Justice, stated in a Commons written answer that "there are no valid Cornish stannary organisations in existence" and that there "are no treaties today that apply to Cornwall only".

== Stannary courts ==
The Devon stannary courts met in Lydford and operated a prison there, while the Cornish stannary courts met primarily in Truro. The Devon and Cornwall stannary courts were merged into a single Stannaries Court following the Stannaries Act 1855, but their powers were later transferred to county authorities by the Stannaries Court (Abolition) Act 1896.

The relations between the stannaries and Westminster were discussed in Strode's Case (1512).

== Mining courts and customs in other counties ==
While the stannaries of Cornwall and Devon had the most developed legal systems, a number of other mining communities had similar privileges. The customs of the community were usually confirmed by charter, with the miners having the right to seek for minerals in all areas other than tilled fields, subject to paying taxes to the Crown.

Examples included:

- Gloucestershire: The Free Miners of coal and iron of the Forest of Dean had their customs confirmed by charter attributed to Edward I, with a miner's court to try cases between the miners, and a miner's parliament.
- Derbyshire: The hundreds of High Peak and Wirksworth (an area known as the "King's Field") were divided into eight "liberties" for the purposes of lead mining, and disputes were heard in the barmote courts.
- Somerset: The customs of the lead-mining district of the Mendip Hills were encoded under Edward IV. Two courts, consisting of twelve miners, were held annually to enforce the code.
- Cumberland: The lead miners of Alston Moor enjoyed legal privileges from the thirteenth century. By the reign of Henry V there was in existence a court of mines, and the miners elected a coroner and bailiff, with the king's officers having no authority to serve writs in the area.

== Present day ==
Some Cornish political activists claim to have revived the Stannary Parliament since 1974, along with the right to veto British legislation. Indeed, it purports to have actually vetoed acts passed by the Parliament of the United Kingdom, although it has been unable to enforce this.

On 12 December 1974 the Home Office replied to letters from the members of this revived parliament, saying that the Home Office could only accept elections by the stannary towns as constitutive of a valid stannary parliament. However, the stannaries were not abolished, and the Home Office has made no effort to hold these elections. The Revived Cornish Stannary Parliament is driven primarily by Cornish nationalism and demands for greater local autonomy, along with arguments about the constitutional status of Cornwall.

== See also ==
- Barmote court – similar institution for lead mining in Derbyshire
- Warden's court – similar institution in Australia
- Stannary
- List of topics related to Cornwall
- Cornish Stannary Parliament
- Stannary Convocation of Devon
- Duchy of Cornwall
