= Lord Warden of the Stannaries =

Office in the governance of Cornwall

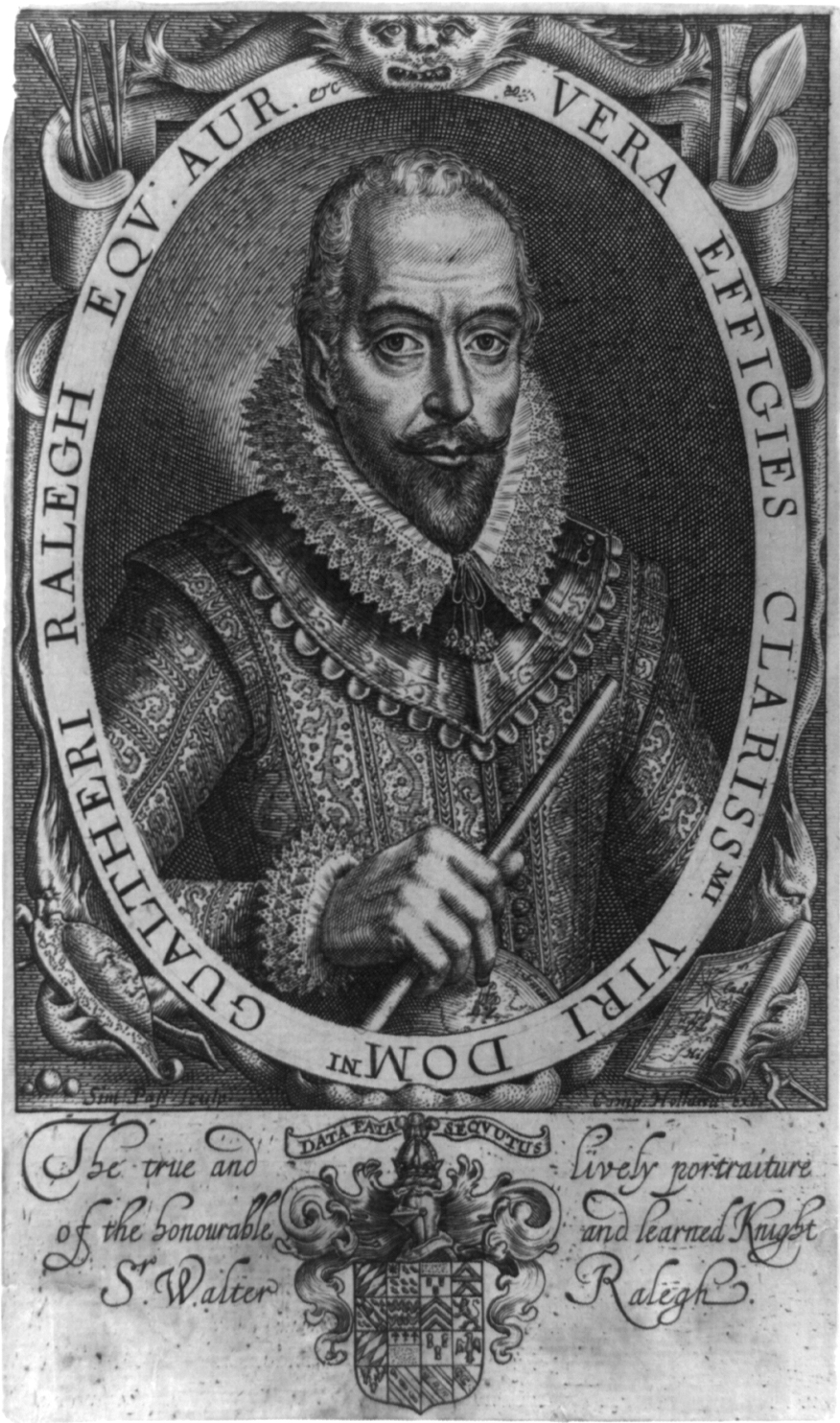
Sir Walter Raleigh was a Lord Warden of the Stannaries

The Lord Warden of the Stannaries used to exercise judicial and military functions in Cornwall, England, and is still the official who, upon the commission of the monarch or Duke of Cornwall for the time being, has the function of calling a stannary parliament of tinners. The last such parliament sat in 1753. The word "stannary" denotes a tin-mining district, and derives from Latin stannum, meaning tin.

The first Lord Warden of the Stannaries of Cornwall and Devon was William de Wrotham, who was appointed during the reign of Richard I on 20 November 1197. Until 1502 normally separate Lords Warden were appointed for Cornwall and Devon (as shown in brackets below) and these also acted as stewards for Duchy estates in those counties.

In 1502, Robert, 2nd Lord Willoughby de Broke, was appointed as Lord Steward for Duchy estates in Cornwall and Devon, Lord Warden of the Stannaries in both, Master Forester of Dartmoor. The successors appointed since have been granted these offices/titles.

In the present day, the Lord Warden is de facto Deputy Chairman of the Prince's Council (the Chairman being the Duke of Cornwall); as such, he or she plays a key role in administering the Duchy of Cornwall estate. The current holder of the post (since December 2022) is Hugo van Vredenburch.

A relevant Vice-Warden, frequently for one of the two counties for a warden who normally lived elsewhere, existed through many of the years 1386 to 1870. Other than being assigned roles connected to the occasional parliaments, these had responsibilities as controller of the coinage and master of assay, working in concert with the Royal Mint, which dominated high-value coinage end products through its jury system of trial of the Pyx.

== Lord Steward and Lord Warden of the Stannaries in Cornwall and Devon (1197–present) ==
- 1197 William de Wrotham (Cornwall & Devon)
- 1215 Henry Fitz-Count, 1st Earl of Cornwall
- 1220 William de Putot (Cornwall)
- 1220 John FitzRichard (Cornwall & Devon)
- 1220 Stephen du Croy (Cornwall)
- 1221 Waleram Teutonicus (Devon)
- 1234 Richard de Langford (Devon)
- 1253 Adam Wymer (Devon)
- 1262 Ralph de Oddiscumb (Devon)
- 1264 Hugh Peverell (Devon)
- 1289 Walter de Aylesbury (Cornwall)
- 1306 Thomas de la Hyde (Cornwall)
- 1312 John de Bedewynde (Cornwall)
- 1314 Thomas Lercedekne (Cornwall)
- 1318 Henry de Wylyngton (Cornwall)
- 1321 Simon Belde (Devon)
- 1321 Gilbert de la Forde (Devon)
- 1328 Thomas de Shirygg (Devon)
- 1328 Richard Caleware (Devon)
- 1330 William de Montacute (Devon)
- 1337 Thomas West (Cornwall)
- 1346 Sir Edmund de Kendale (Cornwall)
- 1350 Sir John Dabernon (Cornwall)
- 1350 Bartholomew de Berghersh (Devon)
- 1357 Robert de Elford (Cornwall)
- 1359 Sir John Dabernon (Cornwall)
- 1361 Bartholomew de Burghersh Jnr (Cornwall & Devon)
- 1366 John de Skirbec (Cornwall)
- 1375 John Cary (Devon)
- 1376 Hugh de Segrave (Cornwall)
- ? Robert Tresilian
- 1378 Sir John de Kentwode (Cornwall)
- 1384 Richard Ruyhale Jnr
- 1386 Richard Breton (Cornwall)
- 1388 Sir Philip de Courtenay (Cornwall)
- 1388 John de Copplestone
- 1389 Warin Waldegrave (Devon)
- 1392 John Colshull (Cornwall)
- 1397 Richard Chelmswyke (Cornwall)
- 1398 Thomas Shelle (Cornwall & Devon)
- 1399 John Wynter (Cornwall)
- 1399 John de Waterton (Devon)
- 1400 Sir John Arundell (Cornwall)
- 1413 Thomas Tickhill (Cornwall & Devon)
- 1413–1422: John Wilcotes (Devon)
- 1422: John Copplestone (Devon) (jointly)
- 1422 Thomas Congreve (Devon)
- 1423 Lewis John (Devon)
- 1430 Sir Philip Courtenay (Cornwall)
- 1437 Sir William Bonville, later 1st Lord Bonville (Cornwall)
- 1439 Ralph Babthorpe (Cornwall)
- 1441 Thomas Courtenay, Earl of Devon (Cornwall)
- 1442 John Trevelyan (Devon)
- 1452 William, Lord Bonville (Cornwall)
- 1454 Richard Plantagenet, Duke of York (Cornwall & Devon)
- 1457 John Beaumont, Viscount Beaumont (Cornwall & Devon)
- 1461 Thomas Clemens (Cornwall)
- 1461 Humphrey Stafford, 1st Earl of Devon (Cornwall)
- 1461 Roger Dinham (Devon)
- 1465 Humphrey Stafford, 1st Earl of Devon (Cornwall & Devon)
- 1469 John, Lord Dinham (Devon)
- 1469 Sir John Stafford (Cornwall & Devon)
- 1473 Anthony Woodville, 2nd Earl Rivers (Cornwall & Devon)
- 1476 Sir Thomas Bourchier (Cornwall)
- 1477 Thomas Grey, 1st Marquess of Dorset (Cornwall)
- 1483 John Dynham, 1st Baron Dynham (Cornwall & Devon)
- 1484 Sir James Tyrell (Cornwall)
- 1485 Sir Robert Willoughby (Cornwall & Devon)
- 1485 Sir Walter Courtenay (Devon)
- 1486 Sir John Halliwell (Cornwall)
- 1502 Robert Willoughby, 2nd Baron Willoughby de Broke (Cornwall & Devon)
- 1509 Sir Henry Marney
- 1523 Henry Courtenay, 1st Marquess of Exeter
- 1539 John Russell, 1st Earl of Bedford
- 1553 Francis Russell, 2nd Earl of Bedford
- 1585 Sir Walter Raleigh
- 1604 William Herbert, 3rd Earl of Pembroke
- 1630 Philip Herbert, 4th Earl of Pembroke
- 1642–6 Interregnum
- 1646–48 Edward Herbert, 1st Baron Herbert of Chirbury (Parliamentary)
- 1660 John Granville, 1st Earl of Bath
- 1701 Charles Robartes, 2nd Earl of Radnor
- 1702 John Granville, 1st Baron Granville
- 1705 Francis Godolphin, Viscount Rialton
- 1708 Hugh Boscawen, 1st Viscount Falmouth
- 1734 Richard Edgcumbe, 1st Baron Edgcumbe
- 1742 Thomas Pitt of Boconnoc, Esq.
- 1751 James Waldegrave, 2nd Earl Waldegrave
- 1763 Humphry Morice
- 1783 Viscount Lewisham
- 1798 Sir John Morshead, 1st Baronet
- 1800 Rear-Admiral Sir John Willett Payne
- 1803 Sir Thomas Tyrwhitt
- 1812–1842: Francis Seymour-Conway, 3rd Marquess of Hertford
- 1842 Prince Albert of Saxe-Coburg and Gotha
- 1862 Henry Pelham-Clinton, 5th Duke of Newcastle-under-Lyne
- 1865 Edward Portman, 1st Viscount Portman
- 1888 Henry Reynolds-Moreton, 3rd Earl of Ducie
- 1908 Alexander Bruce, 6th Lord Balfour of Burleigh
- 1921 Charles Hepburn-Stuart-Forbes-Trefusis, 21st Baron Clinton
- 1933 William Pleydell-Bouverie, 7th Earl of Radnor
- 1965 Geoffrey Waldegrave, 12th Earl Waldegrave
- 1977 Peter Kerr, 12th Marquess of Lothian
- 1983 Oliver Franks, Baron Franks
- 1985 Sir Nicholas Henderson
- 1990 John Baring, 7th Baron Ashburton
- 1994 William Peel, 3rd Earl Peel
- 2006 Sir Nicholas Bacon, 14th Baronet
- 2022 Hugo van Vredenburch

== Vice-Warden (Deputy Lord Warden) of the Stannaries (Controllers of the Coinage and Masters of Assay) in Cornwall and Devon (1386–1870) ==
- 1382 Walter Reynell
- 1386 Nicholas FitzHerbert
- 1386 William Wyncelowe
- 1387 Thomas Trewyn
- ? John Skirbeck
- 1389 Nicholas FitzHerbert
- 1397 John Shelle
- ? Thomas Frankelein
- 1422 Richard Hore
- 1423 John Smart
- 1428 Richard Maumfield
- 1430 John Fortescue
- 1432 John Merston
- 1455 Avery Cornburgh
- 1461 John Wykes
- 1471 Sir Thomas Vaughan
- 1483 Avery Cornburgh
- 1485 Thomas Hourde
- 1485 William Treffry
- 1490 John Sapcotes
- 1504 Michael Vivian
- 1508 Thomas Arundell
- 1509 John Glyn
- 1509 Sir Hugh Trevanyon
- 1510? Sir Thomas Deneys (Devon)
- 1520 Sir William Godolphin
- 1520 John Godolphin
- c.1529 Sir William Godolphin (Cornwall)
- 1532 Sir Philip Champernowne (Devon)
- c.1540 William Beare (Cornwall)
- 1548 Sir Thomas Smith (Cornwall)
- 1551 Sir John Charles (Devon)
- 1554 Sir William Godolphin (Cornwall)
- 1555 William Isham
- 1570 James Godolphin
- 1578 Sir Richard Grenville (Cornwall)
- 1580 William Carnsew (Cornwall)
- 1584 John Bonython
- 1586 Sir Francis Godolphin (Cornwall)
- 1591 Christopher Harris (Cornwall)
- 1601 Hannibal Vyvyan
- 1603 William Coryton (Cornwall) (dismissed)
- 1607 John Verdon
- 1607 Edward Leech
- 1608–1610: Hannibal Vyvyan
- 1617 Richard Bonython
- ? Sir Simon Harvey (appointed assayer 1625 for life)
- 1620–1626: William Coryton (Cornwall) (dismissed 1626)
- 1626–1629: John Mohun, 1st Baron Mohun of Okehampton(Cornwall)
- 1630–1640: William Coryton (Cornwall) (reinstated but re-dismissed 1640)
- 1641 John Trefusis (Cornwall)
- 1660 William Scawen (Cornwall)
- 1678 Sir John Trelawney (Cornwall)
- 1681 Sir Joseph Tredenham (Cornwall)
- c.1688 Sir Nicholas Slanning (Devon)
- 1689 John Waddon (Cornwall)
- 1701 Hugh Tonkin (Cornwall)
- 1702 Sir Richard Vyvyan, 1st Baronet (Cornwall)
- c.1704 Samuel Rolls (Devon)
- 1708 Walter Moyle (Cornwall)
- 1711 John Gregor (Cornwall)
- 1723 Thomas Hearle (Cornwall)
- 1740 John Hearle (Cornwall)
- 1744 Christopher Hawkins (Cornwall)
- 1747 Francis Gregor (Cornwall)
- 1751 John Hearle (Cornwall)
- 1756 Rev. Walter Borlase (Cornwall)
- 1763 William Bickford (Devon)
- 1776 Henry Rosewarne (Cornwall) (Mayor of Truro, 1774)
- 1783 John Thomas (Cornwall)
- 1784 Warwick Hele Tonkin (Devon)
- 1812 Richard Gurney (Devon)
- 1817 John Vivian (Cornwall)
- 1818 John Parry (Devon)
- 1824 John Farnham Cock (Devon)
- 1826 John Wallis (Devon)
- 1826 John Wallis (Cornwall)
- 1827 Thomas Commins (Devon)
- 1834 John Lucius Dampier (Cornwall)
- 1850 John Lucius Dampier (Devon)
- 1852 Edward Wynne-Pendarves
- 1853 Edward Smirke (Cornwall & Devon)
- 1870 Herbert William Fisher (Cornwall & Devon)

== See also ==
- Revived Cornish Stannary Parliament
- Stannary law
- Duchy of Cornwall

== Bibliography ==
For list of Lords Steward and Lords Warden of the Stannaries in Cornwall and Devon, and Vice-Wardens of the Stannaries (1197–1965):

- Pennington, R.R. (1973), Stannary Law: A History of the Mining Law of Cornwall and Devon, Newton Abbot: David and Charles, pp. 223–6, ISBN 978-0715357835.
- Stansfield-Cudworth, R.E. (2013), "The Duchy of Cornwall and the Wars of the Roses: Patronage, Politics, and Power, 1453–1502", Cornish Studies, 2nd Series, 21: 104–50, doi:10.1386/CORN.21.1.104_1, ISSN 0308-2679.
