= Miss Susan Gay's Falmouth chronology =

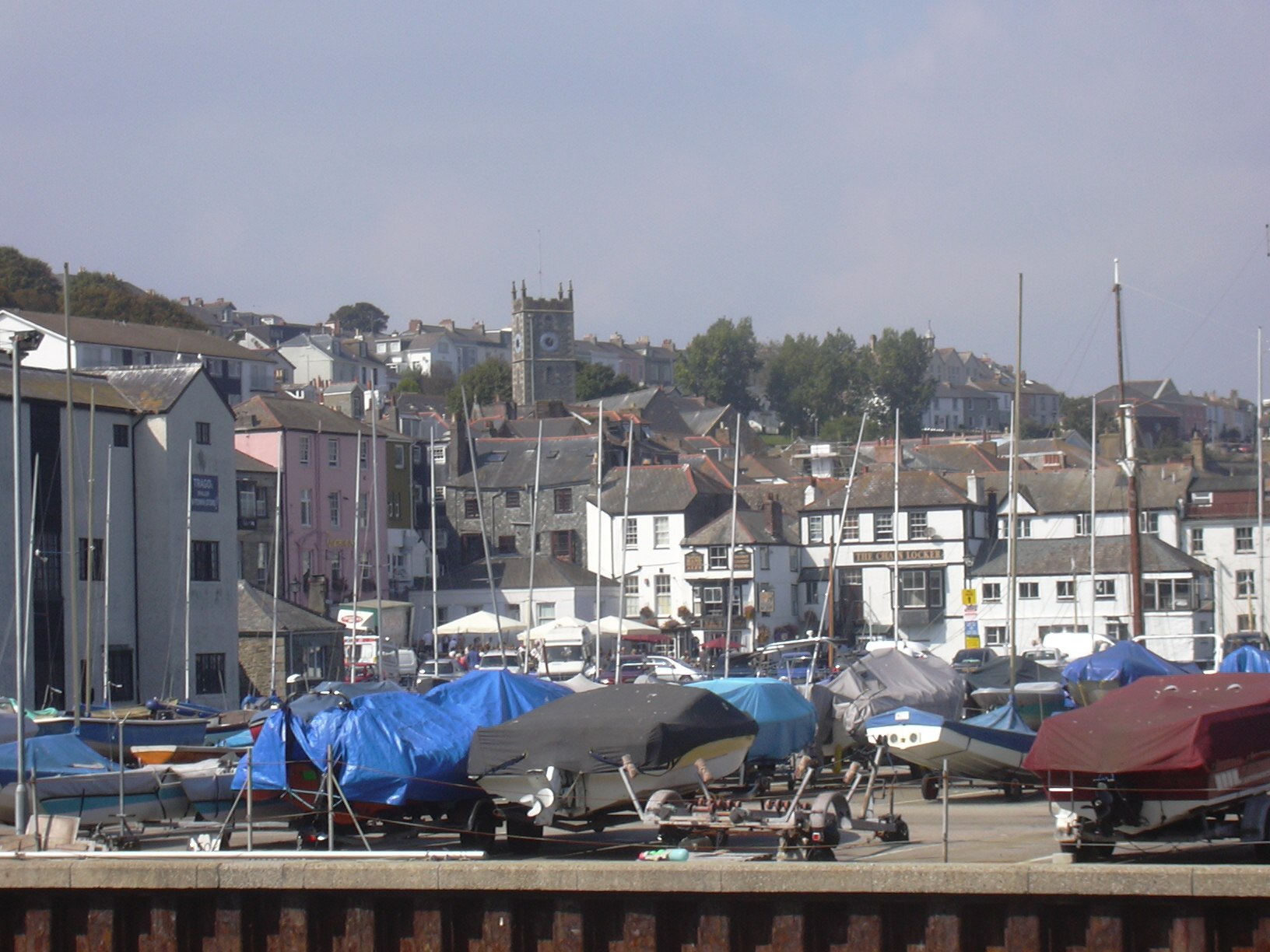
Falmouth Church of St. Charles, view from Events Square

A chronology of the town of Falmouth was described by Miss Susan E. Gay in Old Falmouth (1903), pages 230–238.

== Before the eighteenth century ==
- 9th century. Pendennis supposed to have been fortified by the Danes.
- 1120 The naming of Gyllyngvase.
- 1403 Manor of Arwenack acquired by the Killigrew family, temp. Richard II; Landing of the Duchess Dowager of Bretagne at Falmouth Haven, on her way to wed Henry IV.
- 1538 Old Fort erected on Pendennis Point; oldest (existing) fortification of Pendennis built.
- 1542 St. Mawes Castle built.
- 1542–44 Pendennis Castle built, temp. Henry VIII. Sir John Killigrew first Governor, which office he retained until 1567.
- 1544 Supposed date of Henry VIII's visit to the two castles.
- 1552 Date of Sir Walter Raleigh's visit.
- 1567 Arwenack manor house built by John Killigrew.
- 1600 Ale-house called "Penny-come-quick," near Greenbank quay, established by Mr. Pendarves' servant."
- 1600 Arwenack House, and a few fishermen's huts, all that were built (1550 has also been mentioned as the date, possibly of the erection of the house).
- 1613 Date of the rise of Falmouth; Sir John Killigrew's plan.
- 1613 Petitions of Truro, Penryn and Helston to James I against its progress.
- 1619 Sir John established a lighthouse at the Lizard.
- 1620 Visitation of the Heralds.
- 1642 Prince Charles (Charles II) at Pendennis Castle, protected by the Governor, John Arundel.
- 1644-5 Duke of Hamilton confined in Pendennis Castle.
- 1644 Queen Henrietta Maria at Pendennis Castle on her way to France.
- 1646 Pendennis Castle besieged by Cromwell's forces under Sir Thomas Fairfax, in March, and Arwenack House partly destroyed by fire. Surrendered in August 1646.
- 1650 The Custom-house removed from Penryn to Falmouth, near the Market Strand.
- 1652 Markets established by Sir Peter Killigrew.
- 1655 George Fox (the founder of the Quakers) visited Falmouth.
- 1660 The names of Smithike and Penny-come-quick changed to Falmouth by Charles II's proclamation, 20 August.
- 1660 William Killigrew created a baronet.
- 1660 A prison built.
- 1661 October 5. Charter of the Incorporation of Falmouth granted by Charles II.
- 1661 A quay authorised.
- 1662 Parish church built; opened 1663; consecrated 1664.
- 1662 An Independent Congregation formed by Thomas Tregosse.
- 1663 Register of baptisms at Falmouth Church commences.
- 1664 Registers of marriages and burials commence.
- 1664 Falmouth Parish separated from Budock and Gluvias by Act of Parliament.
- 1664 Falmouth Parish Church consecrated by Dr. Seth Ward, Bishop of Exeter.
- 1664 Two hundred houses in Falmouth.
- 1664 (or 61) Earldom of Falmouth created by Charles II.
- 1670 Society of Friends (Quakers) first established.
- 1670 Sir Peter Killigrew built a new quay near Arwenack.
- 1670 Baptist Society established.
- 1684 Chancel built at east end of Parish Church, by Walter Quarme, rector.
- 1686 Gallery built at west end of Parish Church by Sir Peter Killigrew and Mr. Bryan Rogers.
- 1688 Falmouth became a Packet station.
- 1696 Constitution of Falmouth drawn up and adopted.
- 1699 Gallery on north side of Parish Church, built by contributions.
- Close of 17th century, 350 houses in Falmouth

== Eighteenth century ==
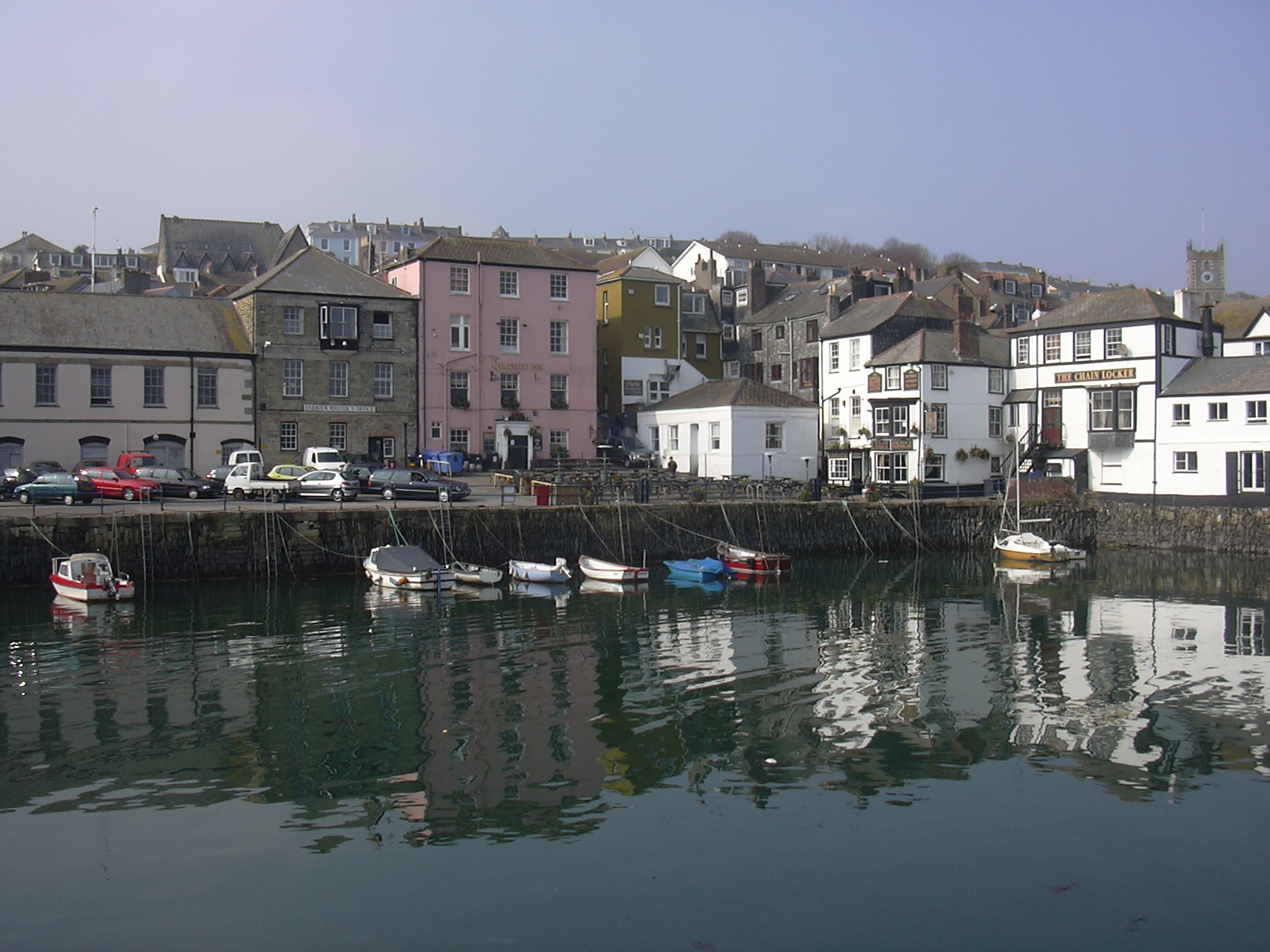
Custom House Quay, Falmouth. The new Custom-house is on the left of the picture.

- 1703 Gallery on south side of Parish church built, and also organ at west end.
- 1704 Sir Peter Killigrew (second) d. at Ludlow, Shropshire, 8 January. Interred in Falmouth Church.
- 1705 Five Packets sailed between Falmouth and the West Indies.
- 1709. The Mayor and Corporation of Falmouth established their claim against Truro to the jurisdiction of Falmouth harbour. (1703/4 also given)
- 1713–15 Independent Chapel erected in Prince Street.
- 1715 Congregational Chapel built; enlarged 1789.
- 1717 Pendennis Castle struck by lightning and seriously damaged.
- 1723 Independent Chapel in High Street.
- 1725 Town Hall in High Street given by Mr. M. L. Killigrew, a brick building, previously a chapel.
- 1737-8 Granite pyramid built by Mr. M. L. Killigrew, near Arwenack.
- 1740 Large church bell provided by Mr. M. L. Killigrew.
- 1745 John Wesley at Falmouth.
- 1748 Fairs at Falmouth; July and October.
- 1749 Alterations made at the Parish Church, probably to the tower, etc.
- 1750 Seamen's Hospital established.
- 1750 Church enlarged at West End.
- 1750 Between 500 and 600 houses in Falmouth.
- 1751 Freemasons Lodge (of Love and Honour) established (the "Mother Lodge" of the Province).
- 1753 New Independent Chapel built in High Street.
- 1754 Methodists first established in Falmouth by John Wesley.
- 1757 Benjamin Franklin landed at Falmouth on his way to America.
- 1766 First Jews' Synagogue, near Mount Sion.
- 1769 Baptist Chapel in Well Lane.
- 1779 Death of Joan Davis, aged 101.
- 1780 Mrs. Ann Davell's Charity of £9 per annum to poor widows or their sons.
- 1781 Falmouth Bank established; Joseph Banfield and Co., afterwards Came, Lake and Co.
- 1781 October 25. A fire, which caused distress to twenty-five families.
- 1785 New Custom House built near Arwenack.
- 1788 August 16. A great fire in Church Street, extending up Well Lane, and as far as the present Public Rooms.

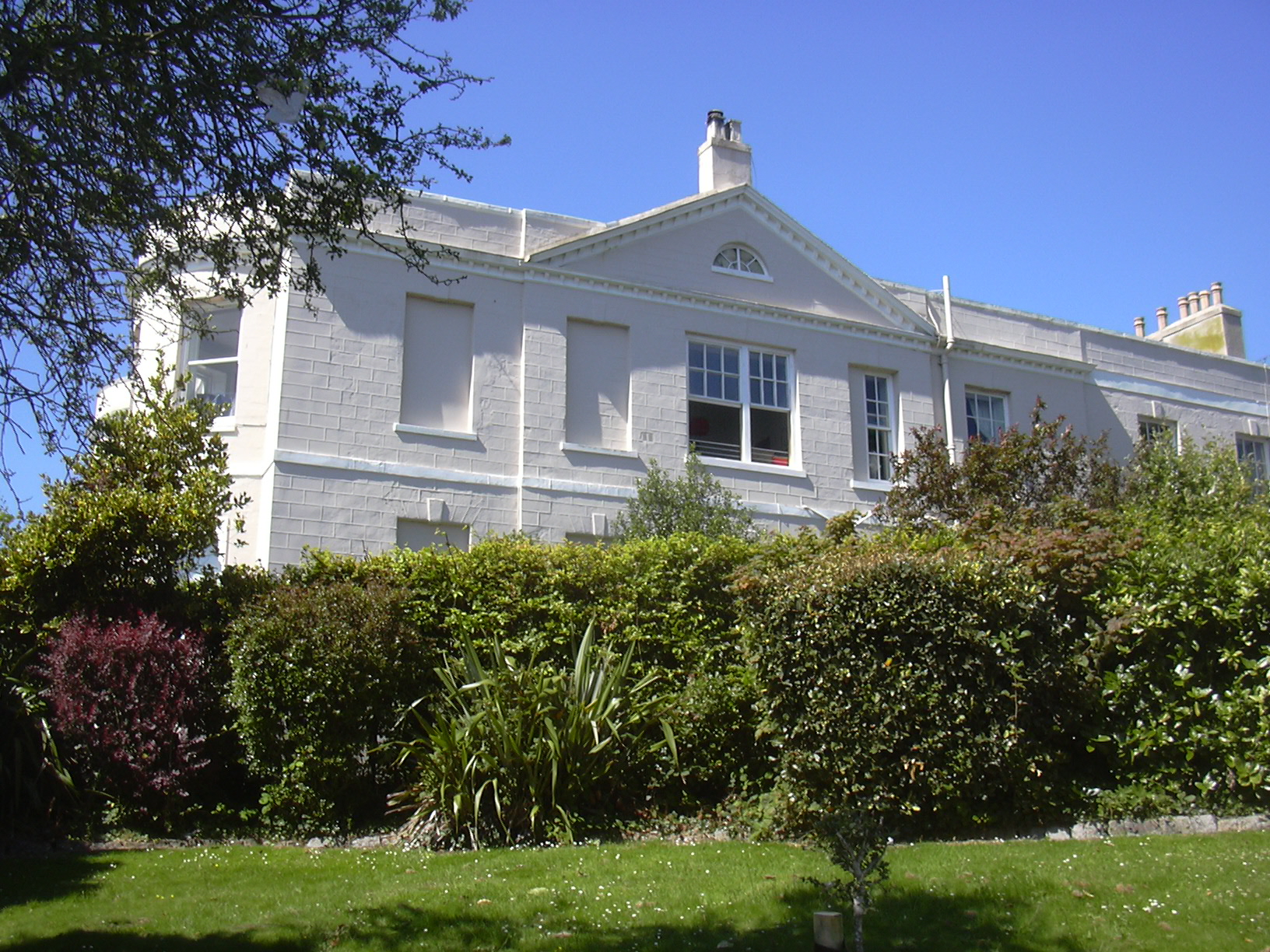
The home of Lucy and George Croker Fox in Wood Lane: Grove Hill House

- 1789 Grove Hill House begun.
- 1790 New Independent Chapel in High Street; Mr. Wildbore, minister.
- 1791 Methodist (or Wesleyan) Chapel in Killigrew Street, enlarged in 1814, organ in 1859; great thunderstorm; Trescobeas and ships in harbour struck.
- 1792 August 21. Great fire which destroyed forty-two houses and the theatre.
- 1792 Market-house re-built owing to insecurity of the old foundation.
- 1792 Sunday Schools founded from 1792 to 1810.
- 1793 Death of Catherine Freeman, aged 117.
- 1794 A brew-house built, disclosing a bed of beach sand under the ground.
- 1795 Crab Quay and Half Moon batteries built below the Castle.
- 1795 The Crown purchased the land on which the Castle stands (about sixty acres), from Sir John Wodehouse.
- 1797 Pendennis Volunteer Artillery commissioned.
- 1798 Organ placed in the gallery of the Parish Church.
- 1799 Baptist Chapel built.
- 1800 The Church tower raised for the clock.

== Nineteenth century ==
=== 1801–1810 ===
- 1801 Falmouth population: 4,849. 1801–11: 719 houses.
- 1801 Illuminations on peace being proclaimed.
- 1801 Cornwall Gazette and Falmouth Packet started.
- 1802 Richard Pidgeley bequeathed £5 per annum for distribution of bread to the poor, from the estate of Mulberry Square, for 1,000 years.
- 1802 Church Charity School founded for girls, and in 1804 for boys.
- 1803-5 Friends' Meeting-house built in Quay Street.
- 1803 Roman Catholic Mission founded.
- 1804 Baptist Chapel built in Webber Street; enlarged in 1807 and re-built in 1814; and enlarged by a gallery, 1834.
- 1805 Methodist Sunday School.
- 1806 Cornish Naval Bank (afterwards Cornish Bank), opened in Church Street.
- 1806 Second Jews' Synagogue built on Forhan Hill.
- 1807 April 3. Public Dispensary opened.
- 1807 Misericordia Society founded by Lieut.-Governor Melvill.
- 1808 October 9. Expedition under Sir David Baird of 150 transports carrying between 12,000 and 13,000 men, convoyed by H.M.S. Louis, Amelia and Champion. On 13th entered Corunna Harbour.
- 1809 Celebration of fifty years reign of George III.
- 1809 Church Sunday School founded by the Rev. R. H. Hitchins and Captain Melvill.
- 1809 The harbour pilots regulated by the Trinity Board.
- 1809 A Basking shark 31 feet (9.4 m) long caught at Penryn.
- 1809 Second Freemasons' Lodge founded, "Love and Unity." Other orders.
- 1809 National Schools on Wodehouse Terrace.
- 1810 Charitable Society founded.
- 1810 Widows' Retreat founded by Lord Wodehouse and Mr. Samuel Tregelles.
- 1810 Mutiny of the Packets-men.
- 1810 Baptist Sunday School.

=== 1811–1820 ===
- 1811 Howellian Girls' Free School; Boys' ditto; organised by Miss Howell.
- 1811 Bible society established.
- 1812 Lord Clinton, bearer of the news of the victory of Salamanca, on 21 July.
- 1812 Death of John Zouster, aged 105.
- 1812 Unitarian Society founded.
- 1812 Parish Church lengthened one-third at east end, at a cost of £1,643.
- 1812 250 sail sheltered from a storm in Falmouth Harbour, convoyed by several of H.M's. ships.
- 1812 Lancastrian Boys' School established.
- 1812 Accident at the Parish Church, causing loss of several lives, 29 November.
- 1812 Removal of the Market.
- 1813 Market-house built by Lord Wodehouse.
- 1813 British Girls' School founded at Smithick Hill.
- 1813 Humane Society founded.
- 1814 Proclamation of peace and rejoicings in Falmouth, 2 November. .
- 1814 The Queen transport wrecked at Trefusis Point on her way home from Lisbon to Plymouth, and 195 persons drowned.
- 1814 Adult School founded.
- 1814 Infant School founded.
- 1815 Between thirty and forty Packets sailing to and from Falmouth.
- 1815 Napoleon brought into Falmouth Harbour on board HMS Northumberland.
- 1817 Provident Institution for the relief of poor in winter founded.
- 1817 Falmouth Savings Bank founded.
- 1818 Unitarian Chapel built in the Moor.
- 1819 Cornish Naval Bank carried on by Messrs. Praed, Rogers, Tweedy, and Williams.
- 1819 First Gas-Works established by Mr. Wynne.
- 1820 Roman Catholic Chapel built on Green Bank (formerly in Well Lane).

=== 1821–1830 ===
- 1821 850 houses, and 7,000 population.
- 1824 Classical and Mathematical School built, Headmaster, Rev. T. Sheepshanks. Endowed 1892 by a bequest from Miss Curgenven, aunt of H. M. Jeffery, F.R.S.
- 1825 Loss of the E.I.C. ship Kent by fire in the Bay of Biscay, on 24 February: 547 persons rescued and brought in the Cambria to Falmouth.
- 1826 Public Reading and News Rooms built and opened in Church Street.
- 1826 Swanpool tunnel made.
- 1827 National School on Mount Sion opened, including Church Charity School, through the exertions of the Rev. L.Mathias and Mr. B. B. Falck, jun.
- 1827 Fire at Quay Street, and another at Tregedna.
- 1827 900 houses, and over 8,000 inhabitants.
- 1827 Visit of H.R.H. the Duke of Clarence, Lord High Admiral, in the Royal Sovereign yacht, and inspection of the Packets.
- 1827-8 Penwerris Church built.
- 1828 Donna Maria da Gloria, second Queen of Portugal, landed at Falmouth, 27 September.
- 1828-9 Losses of the Redpole, Hearty, Arid, and Myrtle Packets.
- 1828 Disaster at a Falmouth ball.
- 1829 Falmouth Packet and Cornish Herald started (discontinued in 1848).
- 1829 Wesleyan Chapel in Porhan Street built.
- 1830 Bible Christian Chapel built on Smithick Hill.

=== 1831–1840 ===
- 1831 The ex-Emperor and Empress of Brazil visited Falmouth (on board the Volage).
- 1832 United Borough of Penryn and Falmouth incorporated, returning two MPs. In 1885 Flushing added, and the representation reduced to one. St. Mawes disfranchised.
- 1832 Steam Packet to Lisbon twice a month.
- 1832 Primitive Methodist Chapel built in Chapel Terrace; enlarged by gallery in 1836.
- 1833 Royal Cornwall Polytechnic Society founded and Public Library.
- 1833 Cholera at Falmouth.
- 1834 Polytechnic Hall built.
- 1834 Act creating Unions passed; meetings of Guardians shortly after.
- 1834 St. Anthony's lighthouse begun.
- 1835 The cone and iron standard on the Black Rock built by the Trinity House.
- 1835 Municipal Corporations Act 1835 passed.
- 1835 Lieut.-Governorship of Pendennis Castle abolished.
- 1836 Meridian Stone placed in field near Beacon.
- 1836 The Killigrew obelisk removed to the top of the old ropewalk.
- 1837 The office of Governor of Pendennis Castle abolished.
- 1837 Some forty Packets sailing to and from Falmouth.

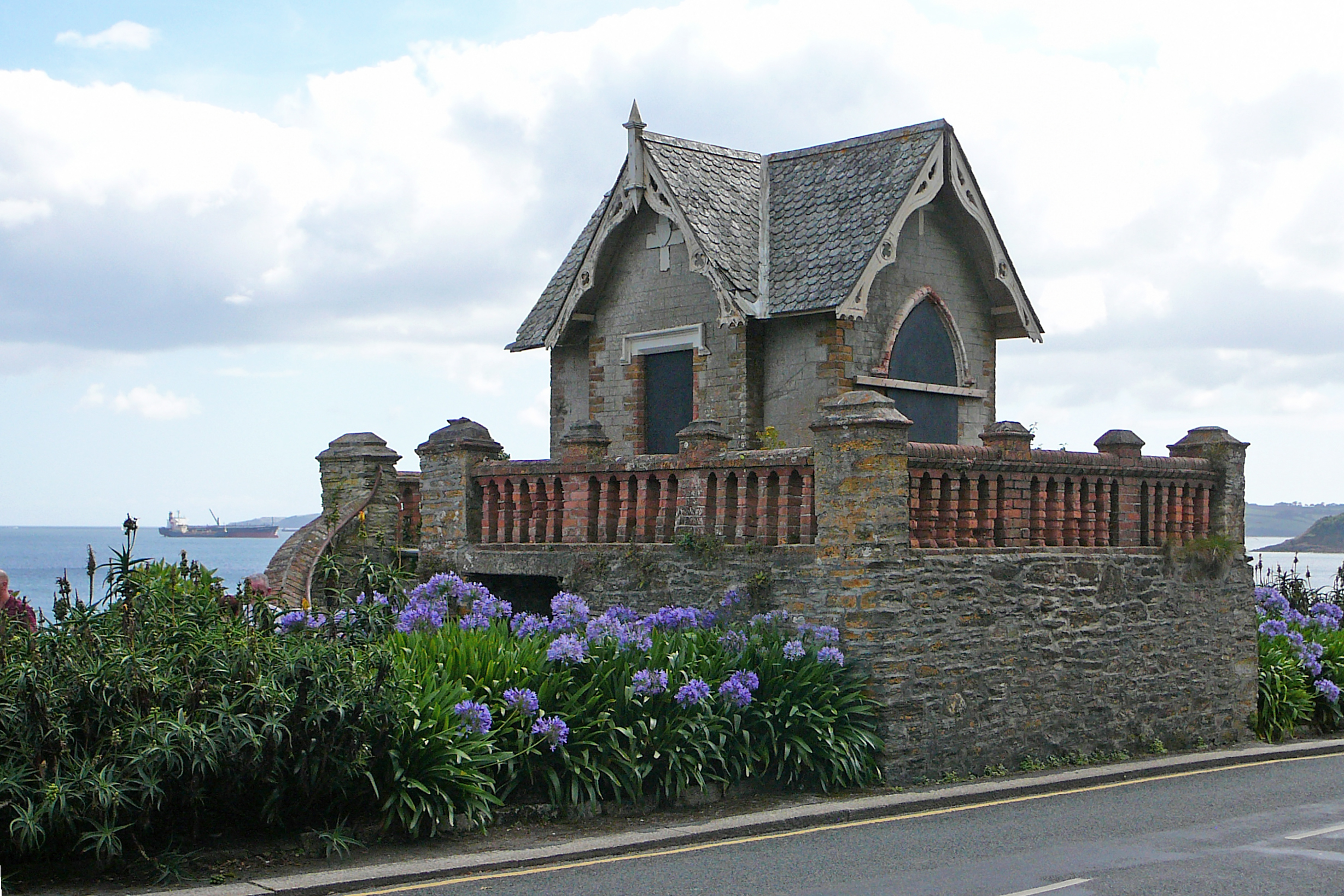
Seafront chapel built for William Coope

- 1838 Rev. William J. Coope, Rector of Falmouth.
- 1840 Gyllyngdune House built by the Coope family.

=== 1841–1850 ===
- 1842 Governorship of St. Mawes Castle abolished.
- 1843 Queen Victoria and Prince Albert visited Falmouth, 1 September, Mr. Joseph Fox, Mayor.
- 1845 Oddfellows' Lodge opened.
- 1845 Destructive fire at the Market Strand in January.
- 1846 Second visit of Queen Victoria and the Prince Consort on 14 September, in steam yacht Victoria and Albert. Mr. R. R. Broad, Mayor.
- 1846 County Court founded: held in Old Town Hall (now Oddfellows' Hall).
- 1847-8 Falmouth Water-works established.
- 1848 Western Provident Association founded.
- 1848 Atheneum Library and Museum founded.
- 1848 Penwerris made a District Church.
- 1849 British and Foreign Sailors' Society founded-Seamen's Bethel and Institute.
- 1849 Vestry added on north side of Parish Church.
- 1850 Falmouth ceased to be a Packet Station.

=== 1851–1860 ===
- 1851 H.M.S. Astrea left Falmouth Harbour.
- 1851 Union Workhouse founded.
- 1852 Royal Cornwall Sailors' Home founded.
- 1852 Art Union formed in connection with the Roryal Cornwall Polytechnic Society.
- 1852 Swanpool Mine first worked, 16 March.
- 1853 Congregational Chapel built in High Street.
- 1853 July 23. 149 vessels for orders in Falmouth under 21 different flags.
- 1853 Town Mission established.
- 1855 Young Men's Christian Association.
- 1855 Lake's Falmouth Packet started.
- 1857 Falmouth Cemetery laid out; consecrated (church ground) in 1857.
- 1857 Electric Telegraph Company opened a station in Arwenack Street.
- 1858 H.M.S. Russell, training-ship, at Falmouth.
- 1859 Cornwall Railway opened to Truro.
- 1860 The Docks begun.
- 1860 Mail S.S. Hungarian lost with all hands, including G. P. Nash, of Falmouth, mail master.
- 1860 Greenwich Time generally adopted at Falmouth.
- 1860 Falmouth Archery Club.

=== 1861–1870 ===
- 1861 Parish Church provided with three bells.
- 1861 Repairs at Parish Church, Sir Peter Killigrew's vault seen, 24 April.
- 1861 Foresters' Court opened.
- 1861 The Duke and Duchess de Montpensier arrived in a Spanish Man-of-War, 5 July.
- 1861 Missions to Seamen commenced.
- 1861 Maria Camilla Training School for girls founded.
- 1862 Testimonial to Mr. T. H. Tilly, for his work in behalf of the Docks.
- 1862 Penny Savings Bank opened.
- 1862 Falmouth Debating Society.
- 1862 H.R.H. Prince Arthur visited Falmouth.
- 1862 April 12. Great fire in High Street, destroying thirty houses. A smaller fire same year in Church Street.
- 1863 Falmouth adopted the Local Government Act.
- 1863 Gyllyngdune sold by Rev. W. J. Coope to Mr. Sampson Waters for £10,000.
- 1863 Old Rectory premises sold for £720.
- 1863 August 21. Railway opened to Falmouth; town decorated and illuminated; and great whale 75 feet (23 m) long, and 25 feet (7.6 m) round, towed in from Cadgwith.
- 1863 Catholic and Apostolic (Irvingite) Church closed.
- 1864 New Town Hall begun.
- 1864 April 7. General Garibaldi in Duke of Sutherland's yacht, at Falmouth.
- 1864 May 10. H.M.S. St. George (training) at Falmouth.
- 1865 Falmouth Hotel opened.
- 1865 Drive made round Pendennis Castle.
- 1865 July 10. H.R.H. the Duke of Cornwall and Grand Duke Alexis visited Falmouth, 1866.
- 1865 March. Hoard of 960 Roman Brass Coins, A.D. 306, found at Pennance Head.
- 1865 Fire at Masonic Lodge, destroying valuable paintings, etc.
- 1866 February 10. Church of Saint Laud, Mabe injured by lightning.
- 1866 Working Men's Club and Institute at Bell's Court opened.
- 1866 Wesleyan Chapel built at Pike's Hill.
- 1866 Chamber of Commerce founded.
- 1866 New Gas Works opened.
- 1867 Falmouth Observatory established by the Royal Cornwall Polytechnic Society; (first Meteorological) maintained by grant from the Meteorological Council.
- 1867 Life-boat established; launched 29 August.
- 1867 Bible Christian Chapel built.

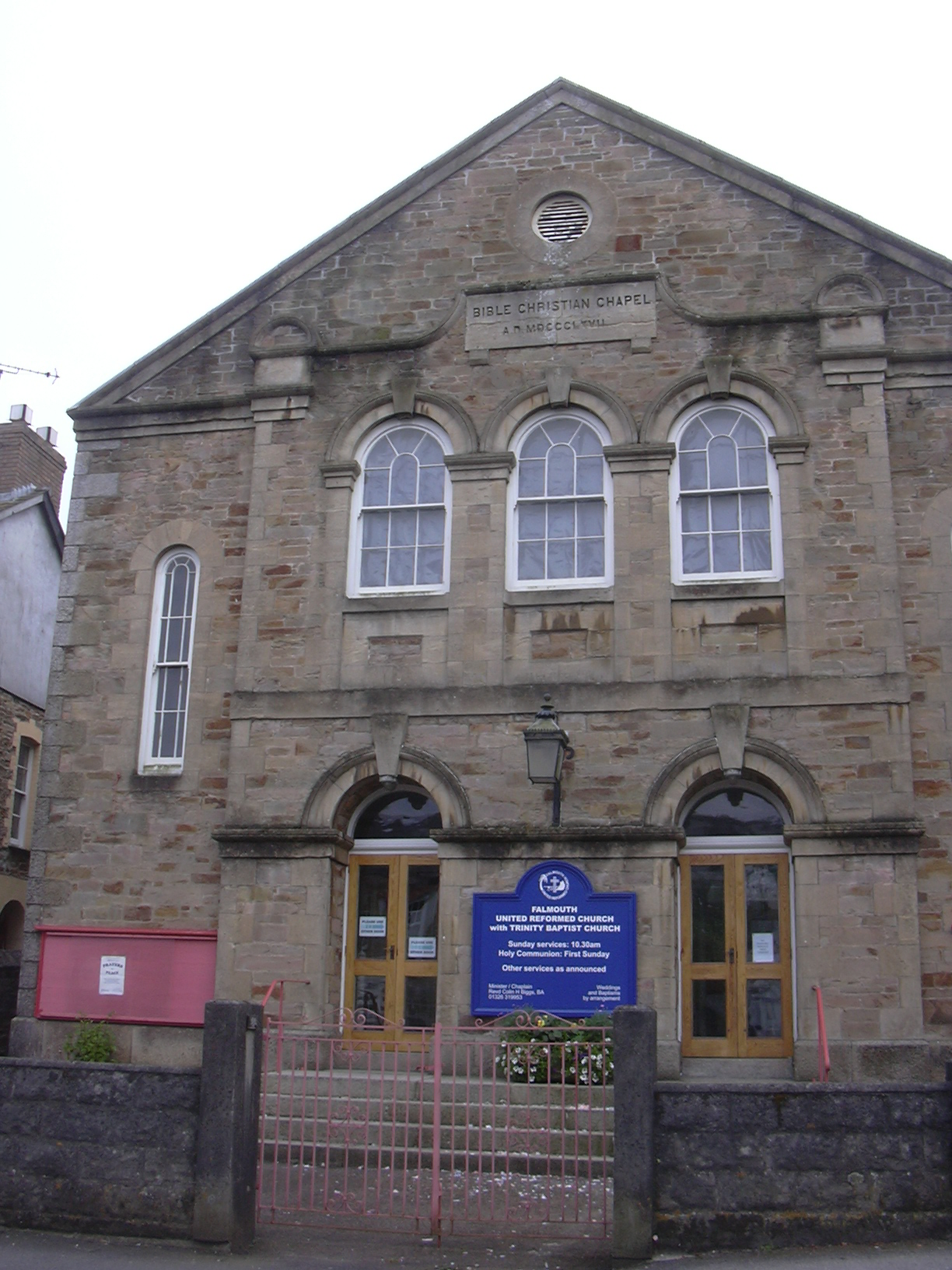
Bible Christian Chapel, now URC and Baptist church.

- 1867 Wesleyan Chapel built at Pike's Hill.
- 1867 Three wrecks at Gyllyngvase, and damage to shipping.
- 1867 Royal Cornwall Home for Destitute Girls built.
- 1868 March 14. Bank House burnt down.
- 1868 June 1. Exhibition of Bath and West of England Agricultural Society.
- 1868 St. Mawes Steamboats established.
- 1869 Roman Catholic Church built in Killigrew Street.
- 1869 Earle's Retreat built for aged persons, by Mr. George Earle, of Philadelphia, D.S.A., and Falmouth.
- 1870 June 5. Great Fire at Market Street.
- 1870 Harbour Board.

=== 1871–1880 ===
- 1871 New landing places at Fish Strand and Market Strand built. At the latter a sub-marine forest discovered. Foundation stones laid by Lord Kimberley.
- 1871 Penwerris Day Schools opened.
- 1871 The Killigrew Obelisk removed to green in front of Arwenack.
- 1872 Royal Cornwall Yacht Club opened (1874 also given).

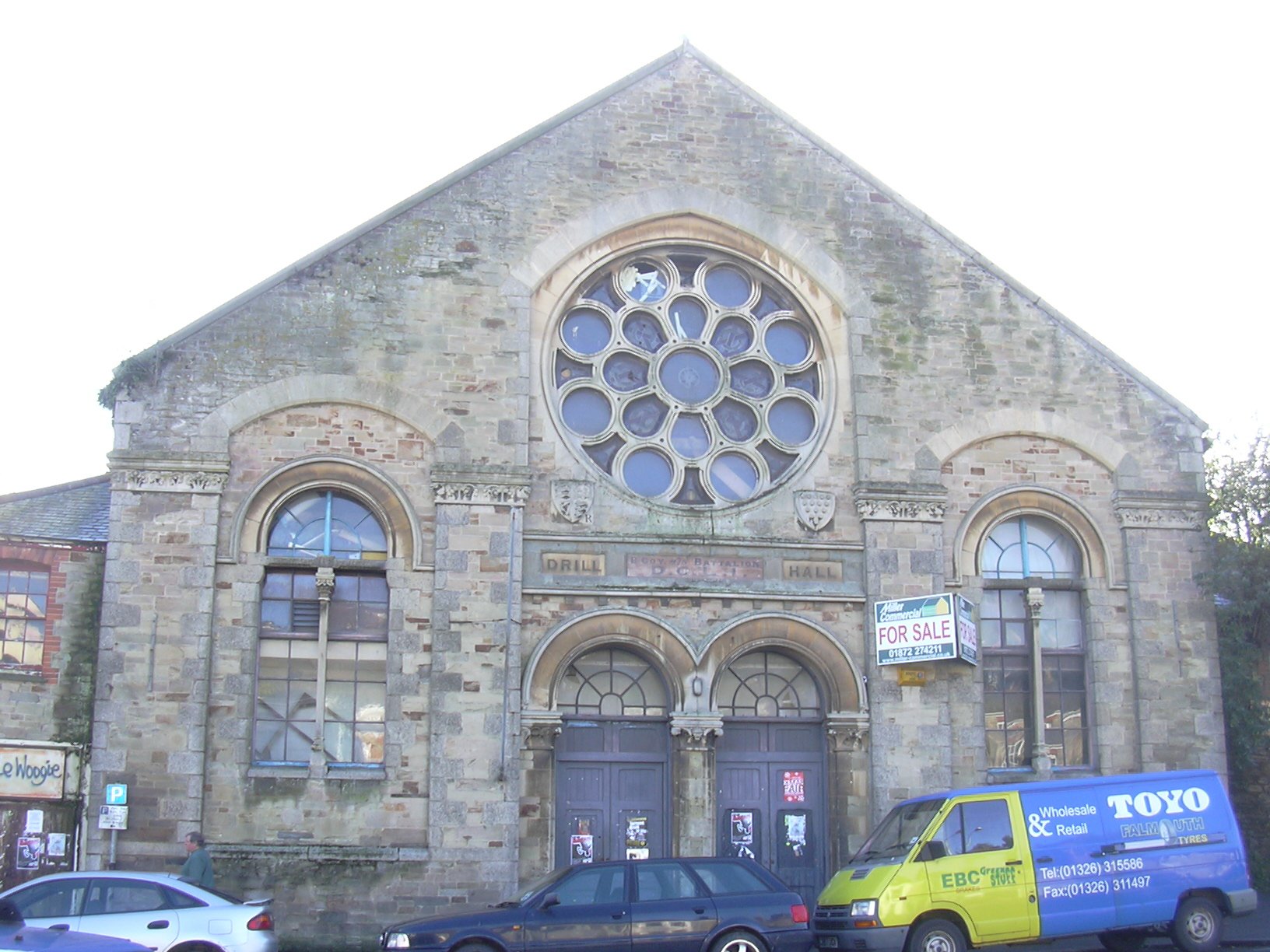
Drill Hall

- 1873 Direct Spanish Telegraph established.
- 1873 Friends' New Meeting-house built.
- 1873 H.M.S. Russell removed.
- 1873 Volunteer Drill hall built.
- 1874 May 13. H.M.S. Ganges arrived.
- 1874 Wesleyan Chapel rebuilt in the Moor.

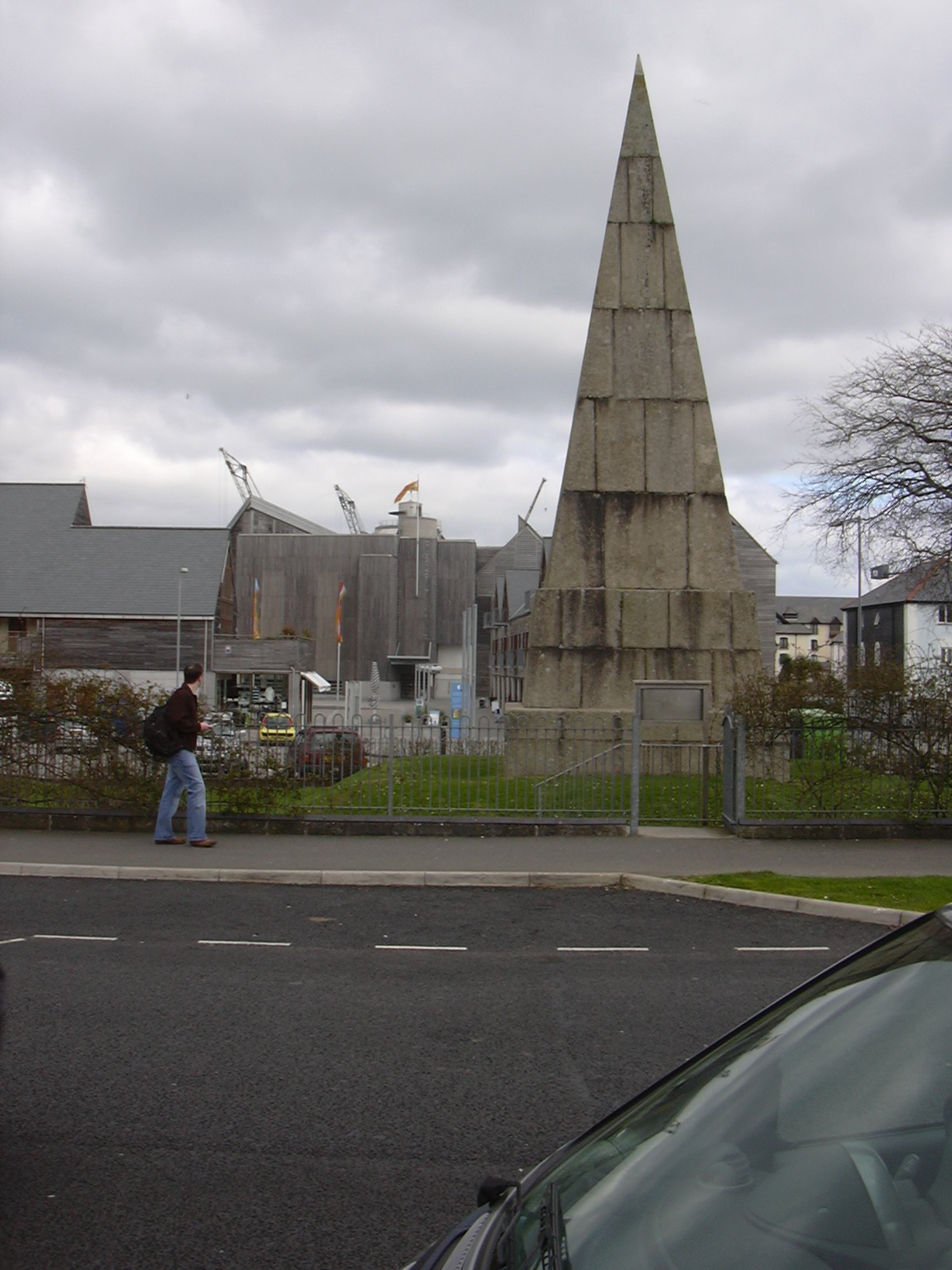
Killigrew Obelisk, opposite Arwenack Manor House, Falmouth.

- 1875 Baptist Chapel built in Market Street.
- 1875 School Board formed.
- 1876 Mission Church or Chapel-of-Ease established in Lower Killigrew Street.
- 1877 Kimberley Park presented by the Earl of Kimberley
- 1877-8 Trevethan Girls' and Infants' Board Schools built.
- 1878 August 14. Portrait of Mr. R. R. Broad, Senr., presented by Lord Northbrook at banquet at the Royal Hotel.

=== 1881–1890 ===
- 1881 Congregational Sunday School erected in Prince Street.
- 1881 Climatological Station established at Observatory.
- 1882 Young Women's Christian Association founded.
- 1882 Girls' British School (Clare Terrace) opened in May.
- 1882 Jubilee Exhibition of the Polytechnic Society.
- 1882 The Rev. Brian Christopherson became Rector.
- 1883 Cottage Hospital and Nursing Home founded by Mrs. FitzGerald.
- 1883 Church Institute founded.
- 1883 Cornwall Volunteer Artillery established.
- 1884 August 12. Foundation stone of second Meteorological Observatory laid by Earl of Mount Edgcumbe.
- 1885 New Masonic Hall built, opened in 1886.
- 1885 Falmouth lost one Member of Parliament by the Redistribution of Seats Act.
- 1886 Self-recording magnetographs placed in new Observatory.
- 1887 High School for Girls built.
- 1887 Recreation Ground opened.
- 1887 Jubilee of Queen Victoria's reign celebrated.
- 1887 Visit of H.R.H. the Prince of Wales, who laid the foundation stone of All Saints' Church.
- 1888 Good Templars' Lodge founded.
- 1889 Consecration of All Saints' Church.
- 1890 All Saints' Church opened.

=== 1891–1900 ===
- 1891 March 9 and l0th. Great Snow Blizzard. Trains snowed up in Cornwall.
- 1891 Census, 2,400 houses, and over 10,000 inhabitants (excluding ships).
- 1891 Association for befriending Young Servants founded.
- 1892 Order of Rechabites founded.
- 1892 Maria Camilla School closed.
- 1892 May 20. Broad gauge altered to narrow on G.W.R., from Exeter, in 50 hours.
- 1892 Extension and consolidation of the Borough.
- 1892 Bequest of nearly £2,000 from Mr. Octavius Ferris for a Free Library.
- 1893 Mission Church in Killigrew Street repaired and opened.
- 1893 May 3. Foundation stone of Falmouth Hospital laid by Mr. Passmore Edwards.
- 1893 July. Pendennis Hotel opened.
- 1893 The Mayor's gold chain purchased for £125.
- 1894 Municipal Building and Free Library built by Passmore Edwards.

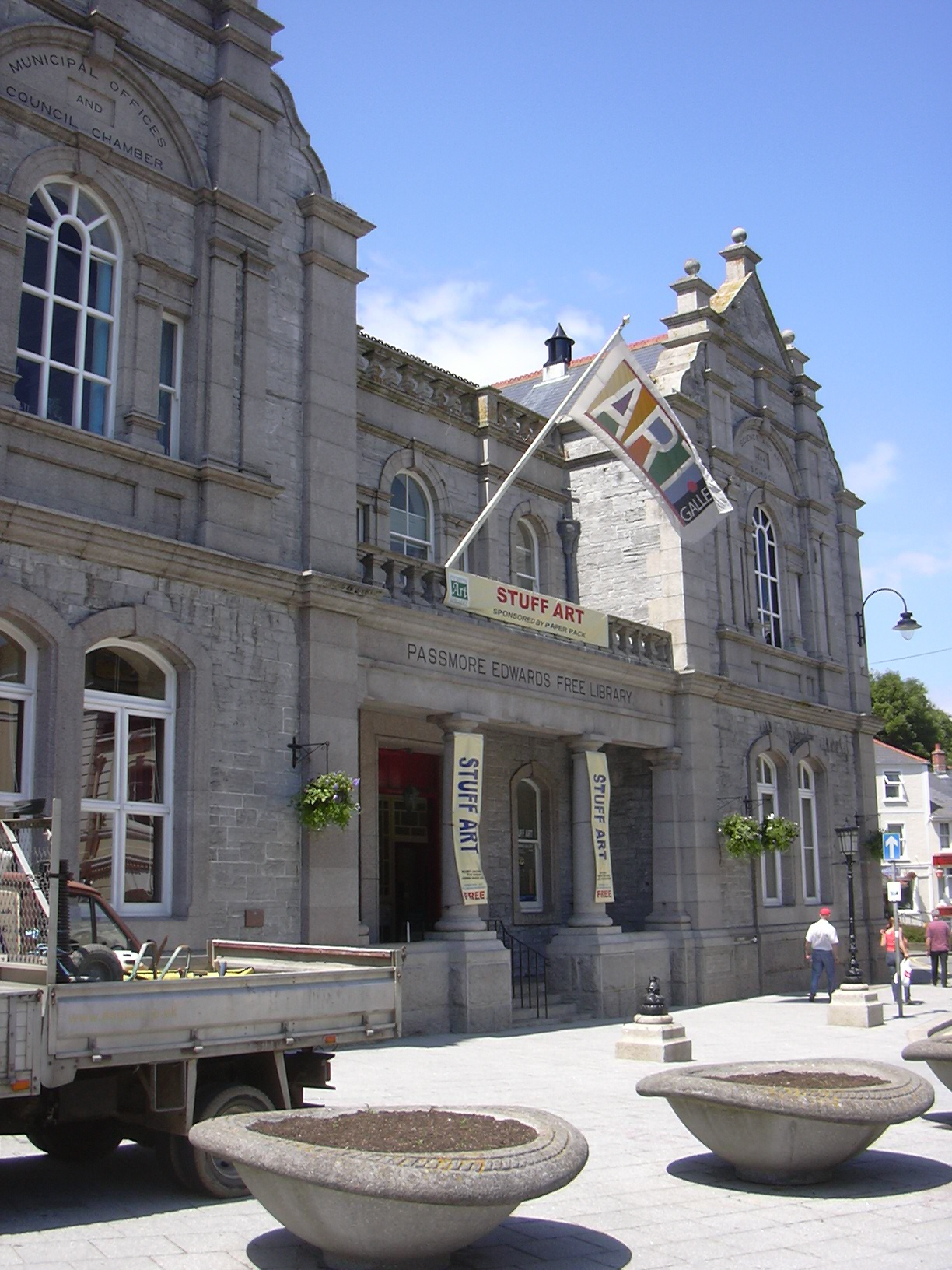
Public Library and Art Gallery, on the Moor

- 1894 Falmouth Sailing Club founded.
- 1894 R.C. Agricultural Show held at Falmouth.
- 1894 Art Gallery built.
- 1894 Golf Club and Links at Higher Argal; removed to Higher Kergillick in 1898.
- 1895 Buffaloes Lodge founded.
- 1896 Presentation of his portrait and some plate to Mr. Thos. Webber, "eight times Mayor of Falmouth."
- 1896 March 9, Science and Art Rooms opened in Municipal Buildings.
- 1897 Board School for boys built at Wellington Terrace.

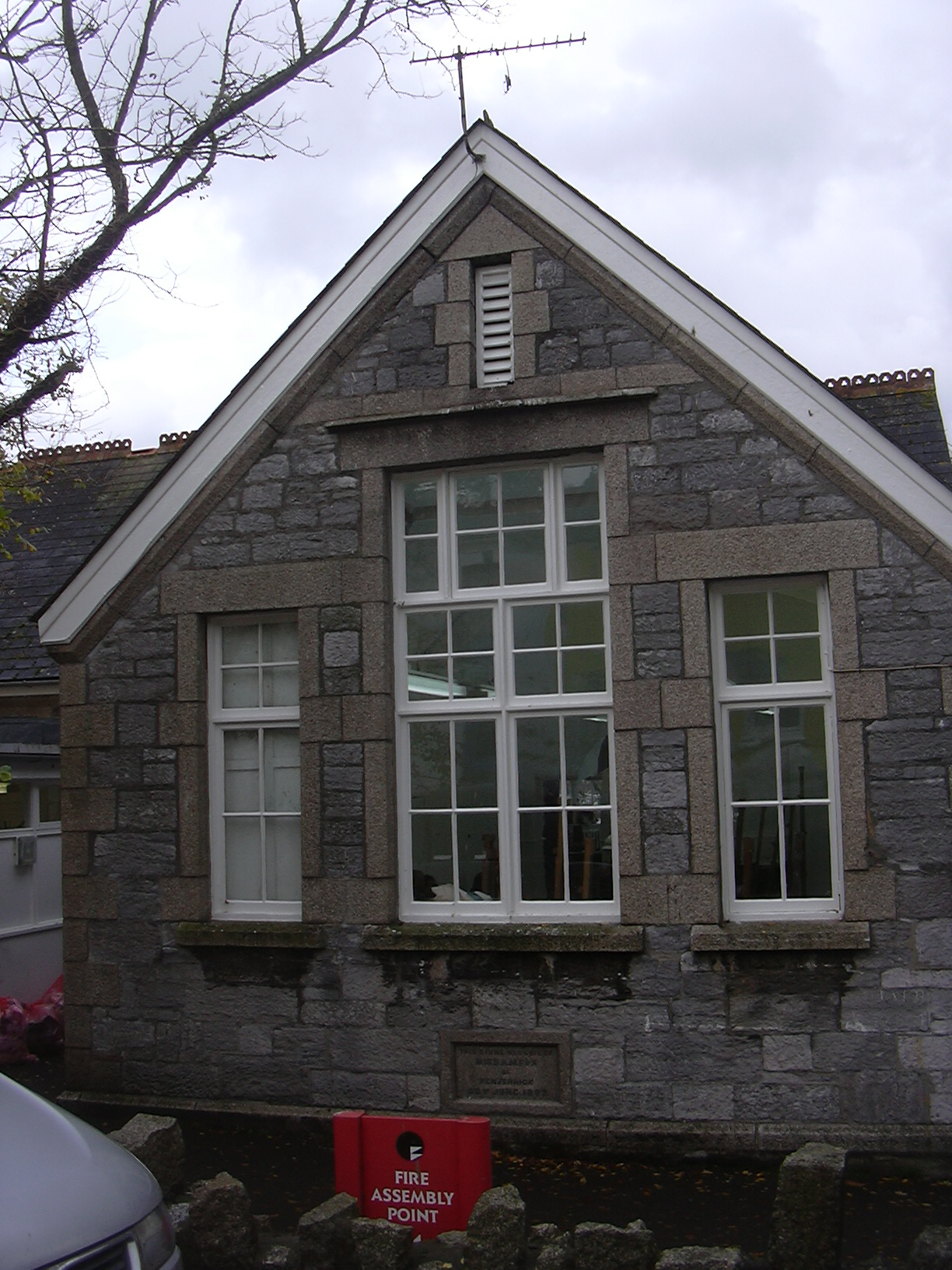
Wellington Terrace school.

- 1897 Smithick (Infants') Board School purchased from Trustees of British School.
- 1897 January 16, the Falmouth Rector's rate abolished as such by special Act of Parliament.
- 1897 Diamond Jubilee (60 years) of the reign of Queen Victoria celebrated. Bonfires on all heights.
- 1897 Time-ball fixed at Pendennis Castle.
- 1898 Restoration of Parish Church completed. The tower struck by lightning without damage.
- 1898 March 26. Fire at Ellerslie, Melville Road.
- 1898 Packet Memorial erected in the Moor, and unveiled Moor.

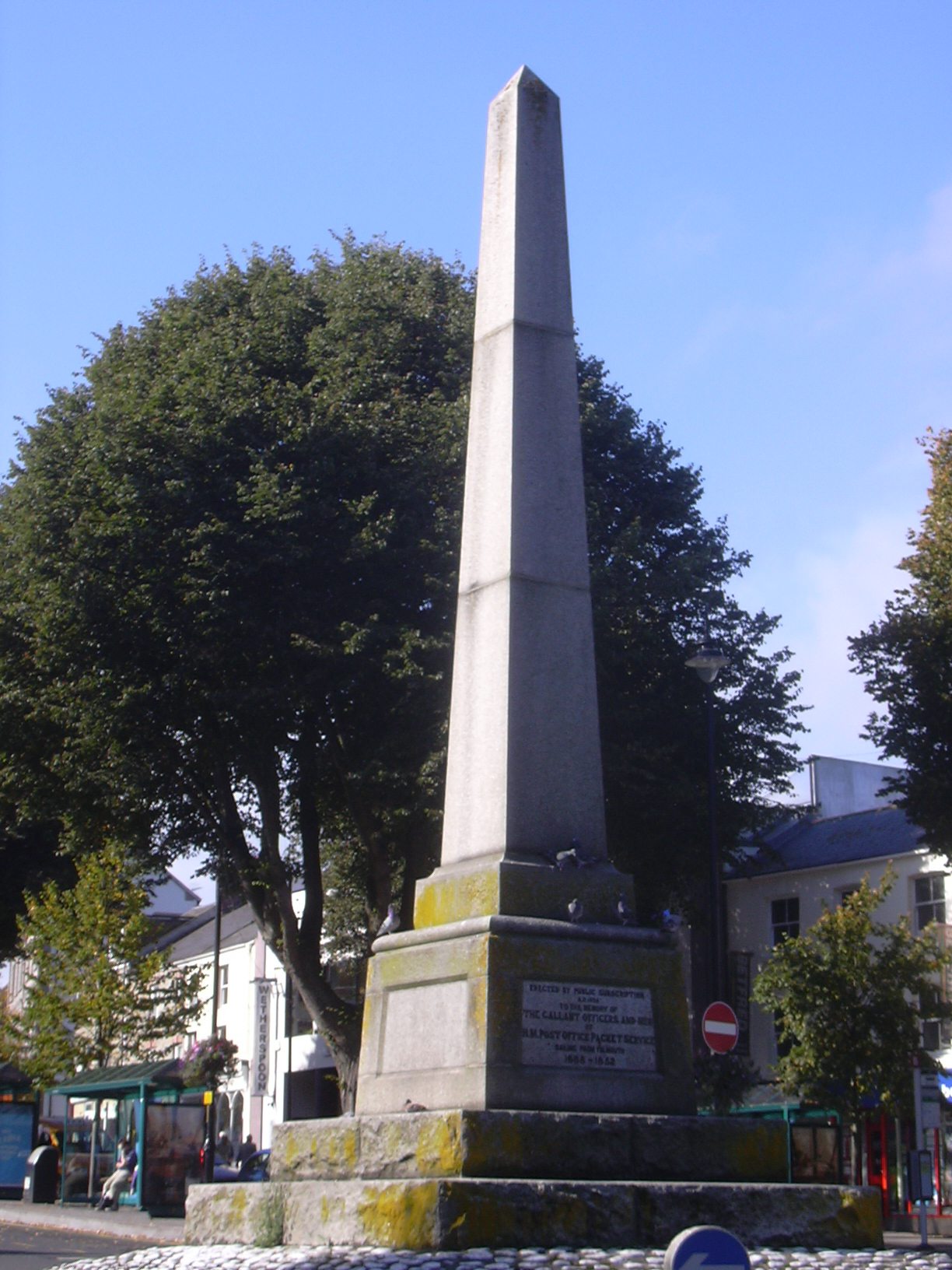
Packet Service memorial

- 1898 Wreck of the SS Mohegan on The Manacles.

, and loss of 106 lives.

- 1899 H.M.S. Ganges left Falmouth, 28 August.
- 1899 Stranding of the SS Paris near the Manacles.
- 1899 May 26. Devon and Cornwall Regiment, marching through Cornwall, received at Falmouth.
- 1899 Gallery, etc., added to Drill Hall.
- 1899 October 6. First Conversazione of Polytechnic Society held (alternately with Exhibition).
- 1900 Rifle Club formed.

== Twentieth century ==
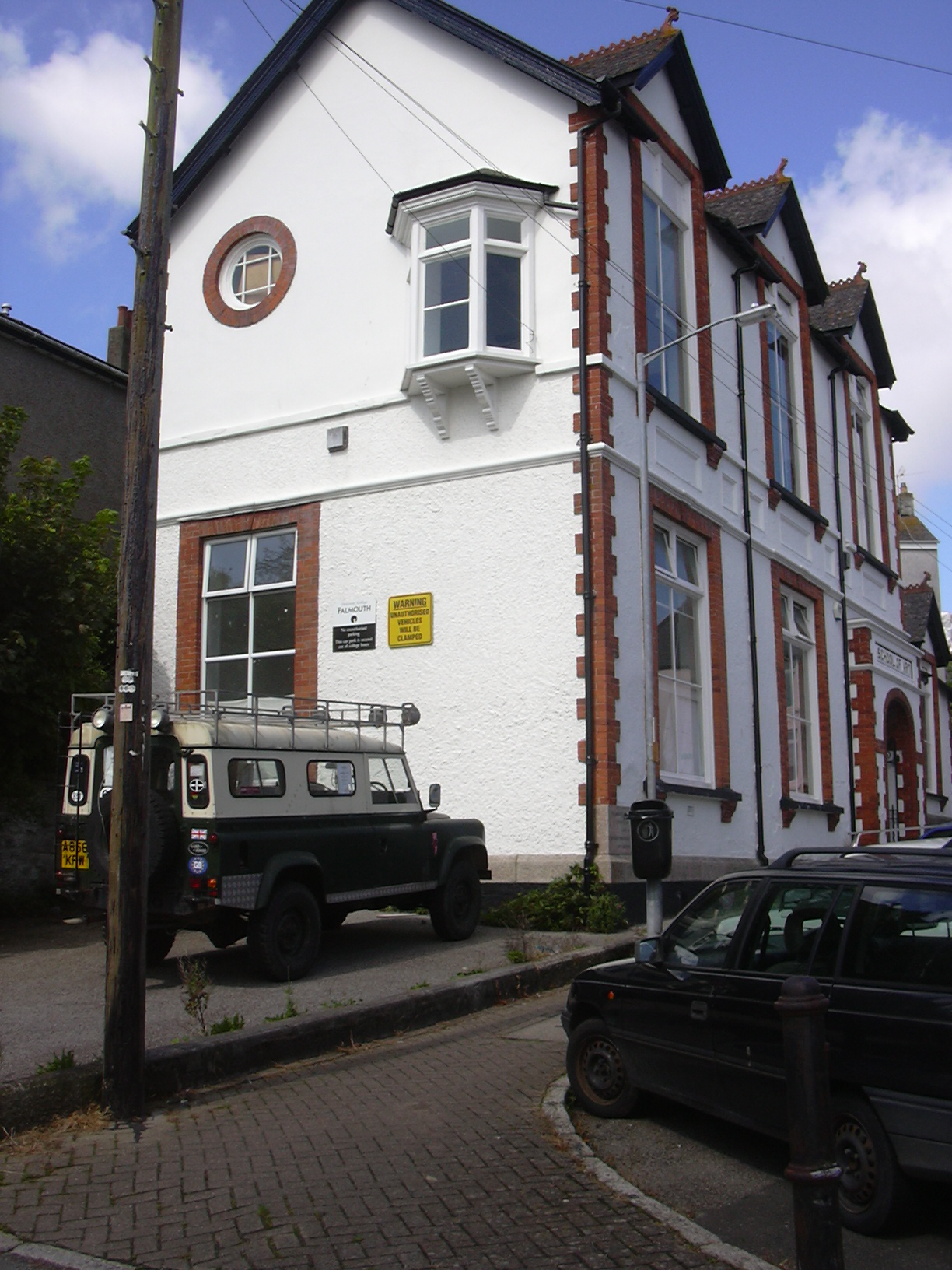
Art School

- 1901 January 26. King Edward VII proclaimed.
- 1901 August 19. Art School commenced in Manor Avenue, in memoriam Anna Maria Fox; stone laid by Lord St. Levan.
- 1901 Church House in memoriam E. D. ALDERTON opened in Arwenack Street.
- 1901 New Police Station built in the Moor.
- 1901 Census taken; Falmouth population, 11,173.
- 1901 Old King's Arms Inn pulled down at Market Strand.

== Sources ==
- Gay, Susan E., Old Falmouth, The Story of the town from the days of the Killigrews to the earliest part of the 19th Century
