= Thomas Tregosse =

- Title: Reverend

Personal life
- Born: c. 1600s St Ives, England
- Died: c. 1670-71 Penryn, England
- Resting place: Mabe, England

Religious life
- Religion: Puritan
- School: Exeter College, Oxford
- Ordination: 1657

Senior posting
- Post: Vicar, Mylor and Mabe, England
- Period in office: 17th century

Rev. Thomas Tregosse (alternate spellings: Tregrosse, Tregoss, Tregoose) (c. 17th century, St Ives, England - c. 1670-71, Penryn, England) of Cornwall was a Puritan minister and vicar of the Rebellion period who was silenced for being a Nonconformist.

== Early years ==
He was born in St Ives, the son of William Tregosse. He received his BA from Exeter College of Oxford University in 1655.

== Career ==
After taking Holy Orders, he preached for two years as an English Presbyterian minister at St. Ives. In October 1659, he was instituted as vicar in Mylor and Mabe, and ejected 24 August 1662 under the Act of Uniformity for being a nonconformist. According to Miss Susan Gay's Falmouth chronology, Tregosse formed an Independent Congregation in Falmouth in 1662. At the first congregation at the Congregational Sunday School, Falmouth was gathered by the Reverend Mr. Tregoss. After preaching to this family and neighbours, Falmouth was jailed for three months.

In 1663, he preached privately at Budock. For preaching at the Church of Saint Laud, Mabe, he was again jailed for three months at Launceston gaol (jail). After his release, he preached again at the same church, and was subsequently imprisoned again. Under the Conventicle Act 1664 non-Anglican services were only permitted in private homes, limited to members of the household and no more than five others. Tregosse's imprisonment for holding a Conventicle at Budock is noted in "The Episcopal Returns of 1665-6" section of the Congregational Historical Society's Transactions. After his fourth time in custody, he was set free September 1667 by special order of King Charles. He was jailed again in 1669 for preaching privately in a house at Great Torrington. In his later years, he preached on Sundays, Tuesdays, and Thursdays.

== Personal life ==
Tregosse married Margaret Sparnan of Gwynier in 1658, and had at least one child, a son, the Rev. James Tregoss.

Though Tregosse was committed to Launceston Gaol on multiple occasions, Wesley bestowed high praises upon Tregosse a century later.

Tregosse died in Penryn. Different sources place his date of death at different years in the 1670s: 18 January 1670, January 1672, 18 January 1673, or even 18 January 1679. However, Theophilus Gale's biography, The life and death of Thomas Tregosse late minister of the Gospel at Milar and Mabe in Cornwal [sic]: With his character, and some letters of his, not long before his death, published in 1671, makes the year of death likely to be 1671 or earlier.
