= St Gluvias =

Suburb of Penryn, Cornwall, England

Coordinates: 50.172°N 5.106°W

St Gluvias: Cornish: Bosheydhlann
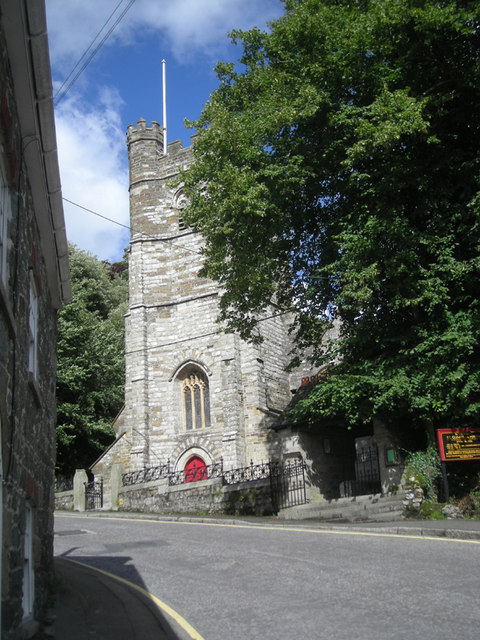
- St Gluvias Church

- Location within Cornwall
- OS grid reference: SW782345
- Civil parish: Penryn
- Unitary authority: Cornwall
- Ceremonial county: Cornwall
- Region: South West
- Country: England
- Sovereign state: United Kingdom
- Post town: PENRYN
- Postcode district: TR10
- Dialling code: 01326
- Police: Devon and Cornwall
- Fire: Cornwall
- Ambulance: South Western
- UK Parliament: Truro and Falmouth

St Gluvias is a settlement in Cornwall, England, United Kingdom. The village is now a suburb on the northern edge of Penryn which is two miles (3.2 km) northwest of Falmouth. St Gluvias was also the name of an ancient parish centred on the settlement and its church. The parish historically covered an extensive area, including Penryn. The borough of Penryn was removed from the parish of St Gluvias in 1866, and in 1934 Penryn's borough boundaries were enlarged to take in the settlement of St Gluvias. The civil parish of St Gluvias after 1934 therefore excluded its namesake settlement and the church after which it was named, and instead just covered the rural northern parts of the old parish which had not been absorbed into Penryn. The civil parish was renamed Ponsanooth in 2021.

== Church history ==
The historic parish church of St Gluvias, dedicated to Gluvias of Cornwall (or Gluviacus) serves the Church of England parish of St Gluvias with Penryn. Gluvias of Cornwall was the son of Gwynllyw the warrior, King of Gwentlog, and a nephew of St Petroc. The church was founded in the 6th century and the parish was in the Middle Ages sometimes called Behethlan or Bohelland. There was a church here by 1291 which was re-dedicated in 1321 and associated with Glasney College; four of the vicars were later to be provosts of Glasney.

In 1881 the church was in a dilapidated state and in need of thorough repair. It was rebuilt by J. P. St Aubyn in 1883 although the medieval tower survived and is built of blocks of granite.

The church contains the brass of Thomas Kyllygrewe, c. 1485. There are also three wall-monuments of interest: Samuel Pendarves, d. 1693, and his wife; William Pendarves, d. 1671, and his wife (both are curiously positioned with the figures which should face each other on either side of the corners of a window opening); and J. Kempe, d. 1711, bust under drapery.

In 1476 William Worcester reoorted that there was a pilgrim chapel of St Mary Magdalene at Cosawes.

The Wesleyan missionary Benjamin Carvosso was born in this parish. Samuel Argall was buried here on 28 January 1626.

There are two Cornish crosses in the parish; one at Enys and one at Penryn. The cross at Enys was originally at Sancreed and was set up at Enys in 1848. The small cross at Penryn was once built into the fish market; when this was pulled down the cross was saved and resited near the town hall in 1895.

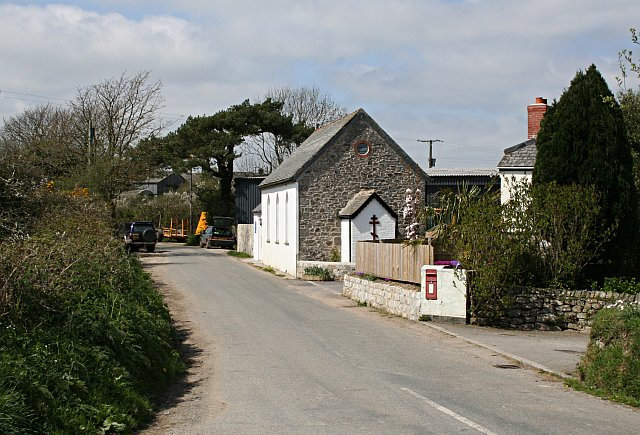
A former Methodist chapel at Laity Moor, now a Greek Orthodox church

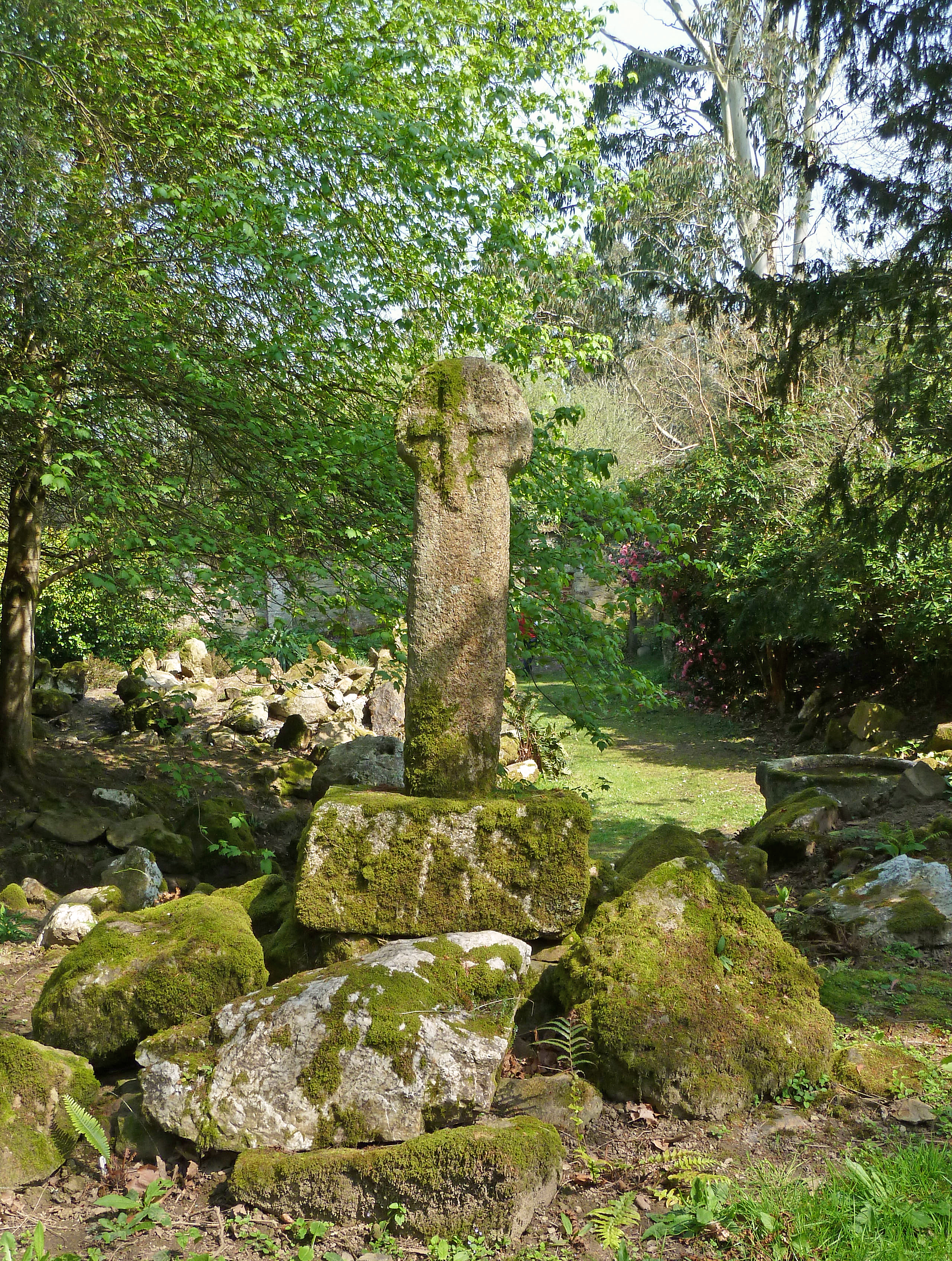
The Cornish cross at Enys

== Parish ==
St Gluvias was an ancient parish in the Kerrier Hundred of Cornwall. The parish covered an extensive area, including Penryn, Ponsanooth and surrounding rural areas. In the 16th century the neighbouring parish of Budock (which covered Falmouth) was downgraded to be a chapelry of St Gluvias for ecclesiastical purposes, although Budock continued to be treated as a separate parish for civil purposes. Falmouth was made a separate parish in 1664, and the rest of Budock regained its ecclesiastical independence from St Gluvias in 1890.

From the 17th century onwards, parishes were gradually given various civil functions under the poor laws, in addition to their original ecclesiastical functions. In some cases, including St Gluvias, the civil functions were exercised by subdivisions of the parish rather than the parish as a whole. Poor law functions were administered separately for the borough of Penryn and the rest of St Gluvias parish. In 1866, the legal definition of 'parish' was changed to be the areas used for administering the poor laws, and so Penryn became a separate civil parish from St Gluvias.

The borough of Penryn was enlarged in 1934 to take in areas from the neighbouring parishes of Budock, Mabe and St Gluvias. The part of St Gluvias absorbed into the borough included the parish church of St Gluvias and the adjoining settlement of the same name, which by then had effectively become a suburb of Penryn. Despite no longer including the namesake church or settlement, a reduced civil parish of St Gluvias continued to exist after 1934, covering the remaining northern parts of the old parish that had not been absorbed into Penryn. The St Gluvias civil parish was renamed Ponsanooth in 2021.

== See also ==
- Enys family of Enys in Cornwall
- Glasney College
- Tremough
