= Mabe, Cornwall =

Village and civil parish in Cornwall, England

Coordinates: 50.1634°N 5.1326°W

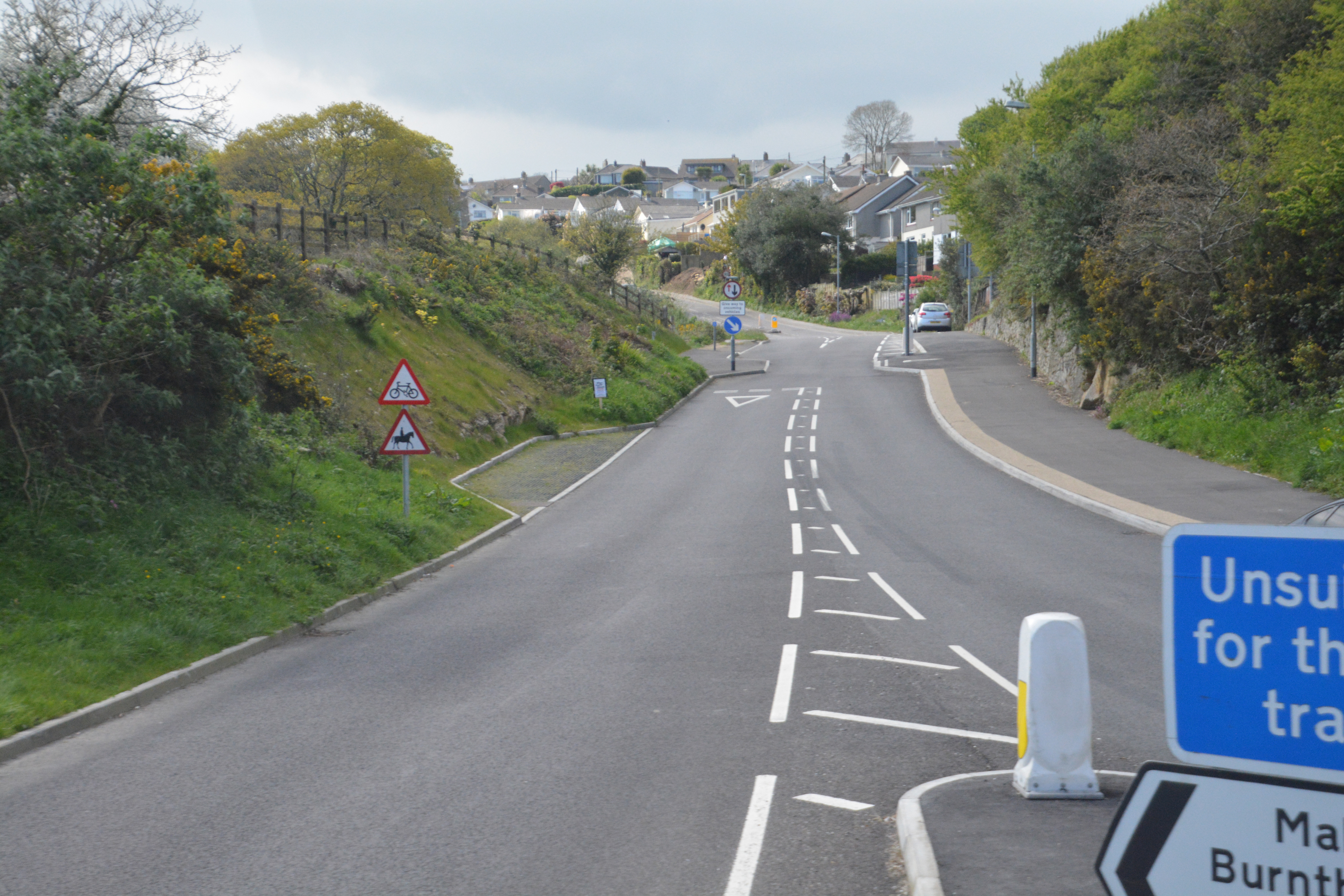
Mabe Burnthouse from bottom of Antron Hill

Mabe (variant: La Vabe, Cornish: Lannvab) is a village and civil parish in Cornwall, England, United Kingdom. The village is situated one mile (1.6 km) west of Penryn. The village is known locally as 'Mabe Burnthouse'.

Mabe parish is bounded by Stithians and Ponsanooth to the north, Budock to the east, Mawnan and Constantine to the south and Wendron to the west. Mabe parish is twinned with the Breton town of Primelin. Mabe parish population was 2,936 at the 2021 census, whereas the ward population covering a larger area was 5,802.

The parish lies at the eastern edge of the Carnmenellis Granite intrusion. It is surrounded by several working and closed quarries which date back to the 1800s. The Argal and College reservoirs, managed by the South West Lakes Trust, lie to the south of the village.

The settlement of Mabe Burnthouse is situated on a hill overlooking Penryn and to the southwest is the location of the parish church, the Church of Saint Laud, which is dedicated to Saint Laudus, Bishop of Coutances. The meaning of "Mabe" is doubtful; the Cornish "Lanvabe" could mean the "lan" of a saint Mabe but the dedication appears as St Laud in all early records.

== History ==
Mabe was located in the Deanery of Carnmarth and belonged to the hundred of Kerrier. Its population was approximately 512 in 1837. In addition to the chapel, there was an almshouse.

There are granite quarries at Carnsew which belonged to the firm of Freeman & Macleod. As of 1972 the Trolvis quarry was still working.

The nearby Tremough university campus - now host to several university facilities as well as spectacular historical gardens - is home to Tremough House.

== Culture and community ==
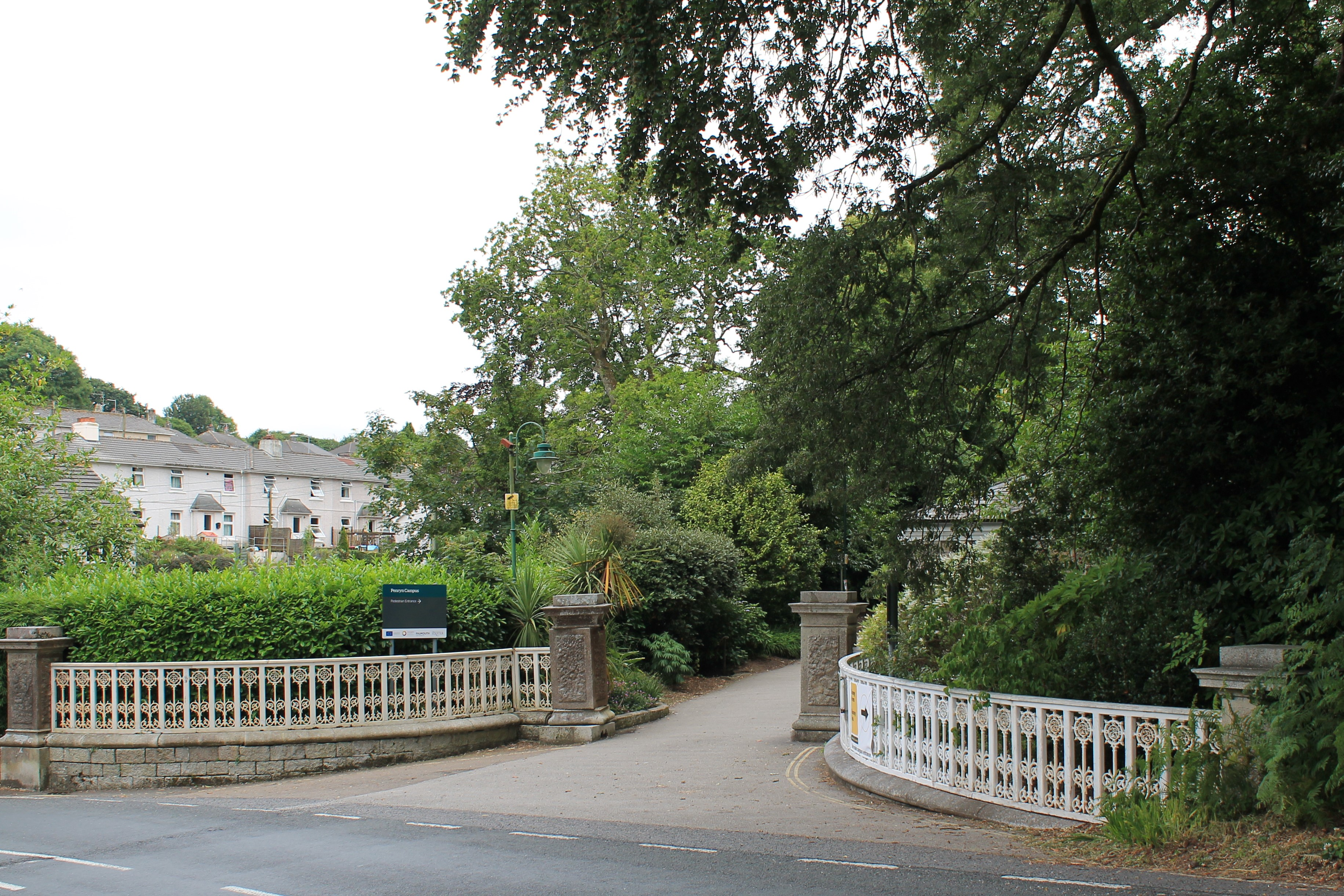
Gateway lower entrance to Penryn campus

A community primary school with 176 pupils serves the area. Near the Antron Hill cross-roads, there is a pub, "The New Inn", and a Post Office general stores. The village also benefits from a children's playground for mixed ages, and two community halls which are used for a range of events and community activities throughout the year.

Mabe Ladies' Choir was founded in 1931 by Edgar S. Kessell MBE and continues to this day. Other active community groups include a climate-focused action group and a bio-diversity group, Bloomin' Mabe.

The village is located adjacent to the shared campuses of the leading creative arts institutions Falmouth University and the University of Exeter, situated within the parish boundary and opened in 2004.

== Parish Church ==
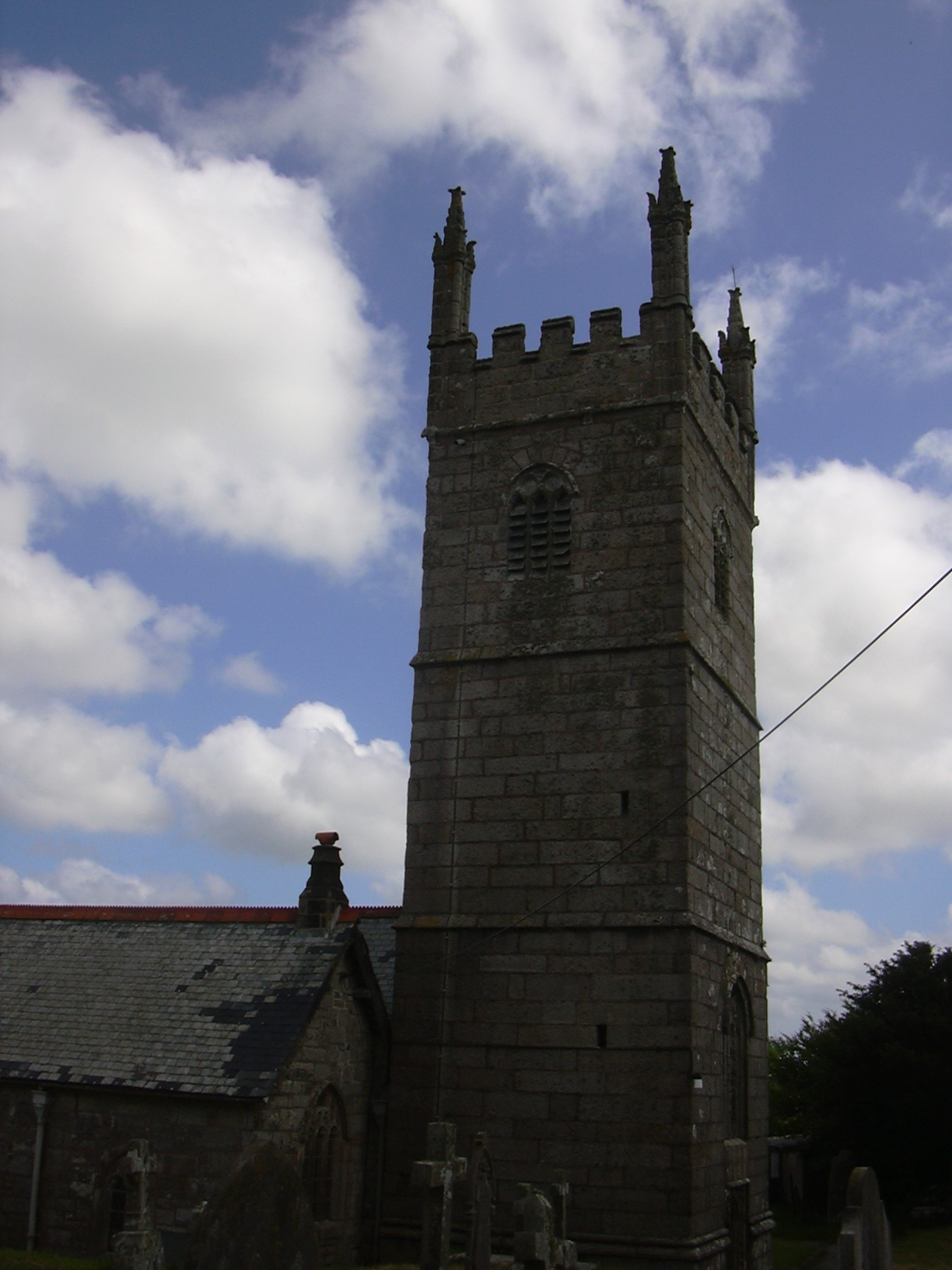
The 15th century tower of the Church of St Laudus, Mabe

The 15th-century tower and porch survived a lightning strike. The remainder of the church was re-built from 1866, under the direction of Piers St. Aubyn. In the churchyard, there is an ancient menhir and a Celtic cross. The latter was found in the vicarage garden and installed near the porch, at some time between 1919 and 1930. There is another cross at Helland, a farm where there was a garden formerly the site of an ancient chapel.

== Cornish wrestling ==
Cornish wrestling tournaments, for prizes, were held in Mabe in the 1900s.

== Landscape ==
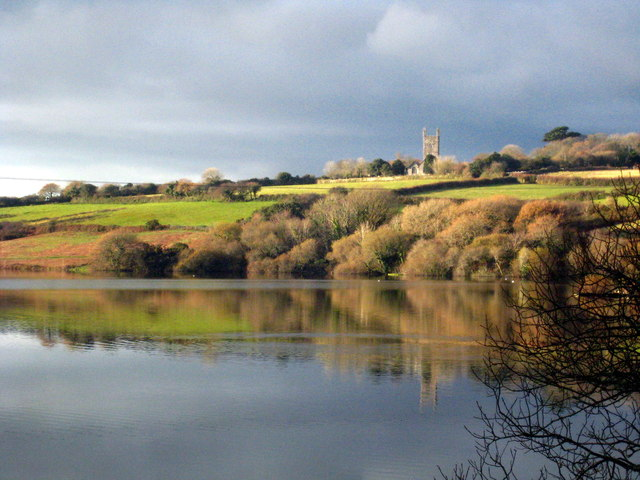
Argal Reservoir

The Argal and College Reservoirs are located nearby.

== Notable residents ==
- Thomas Tregosse (c.1600 - c.1671) Puritan minister, sometime Vicar of Mylor and Mabe, was ejected from his benefices for his religious views.
- Sam Toy (1923–2008), industrialist, former chairman of Ford of Britain
- Roger Hosen (1933–2005), rugby union player, played 54 games for Cornwall and 10 games for England

== Gallery ==
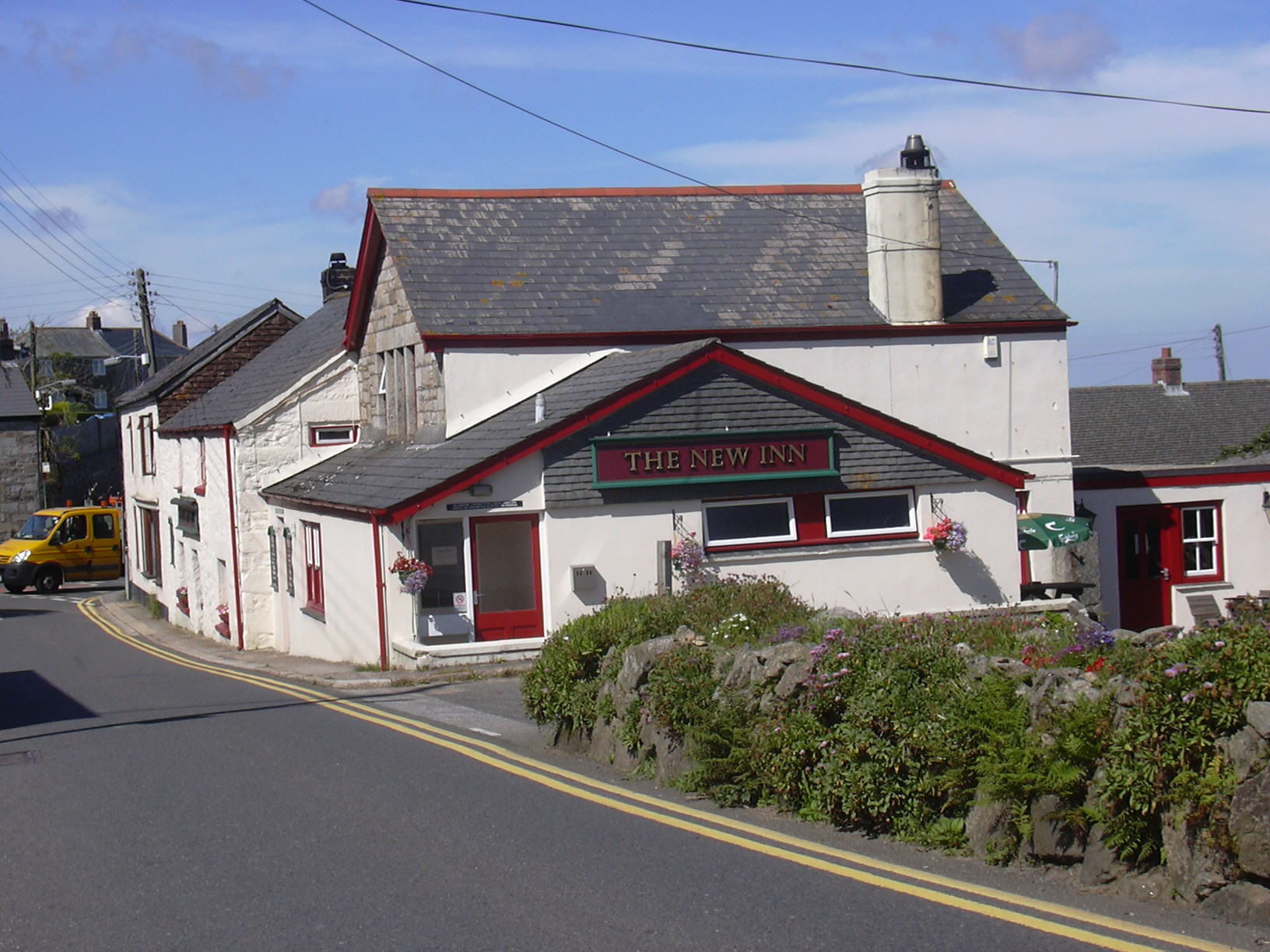
The New Inn at the crossroads, Mabe Burnthouse

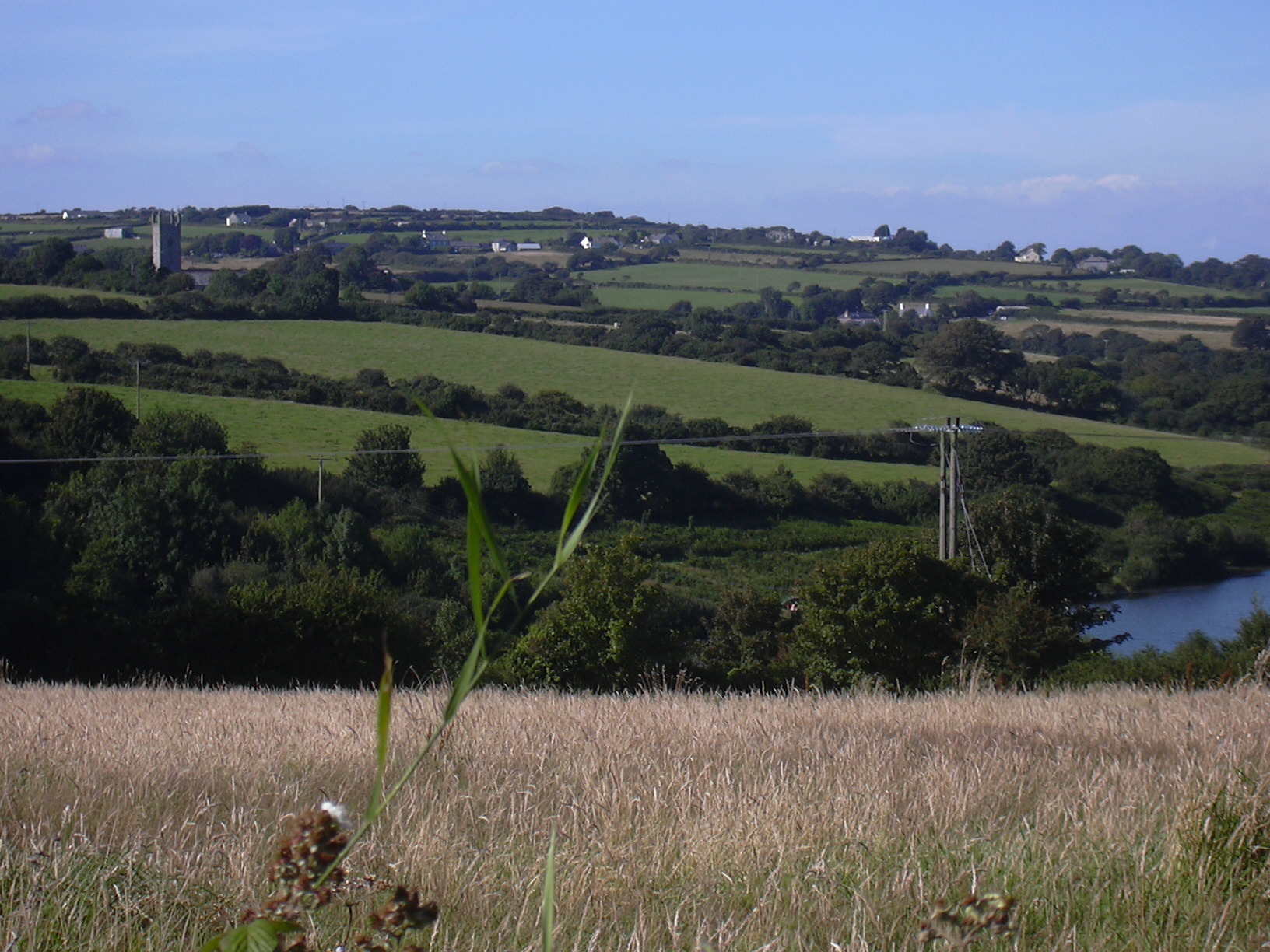
Mabe Church from Treverva

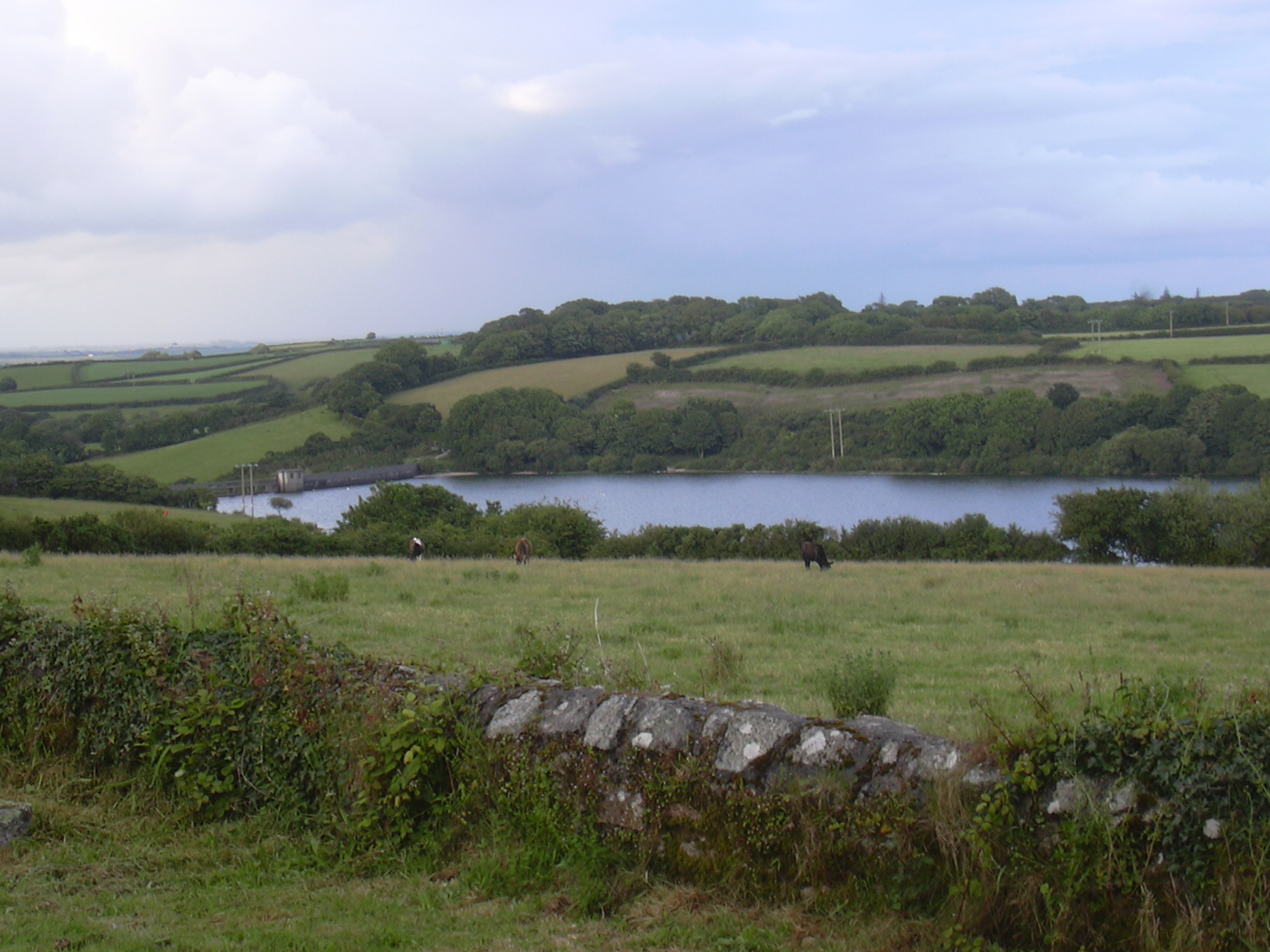
View across the Argal Reservoir

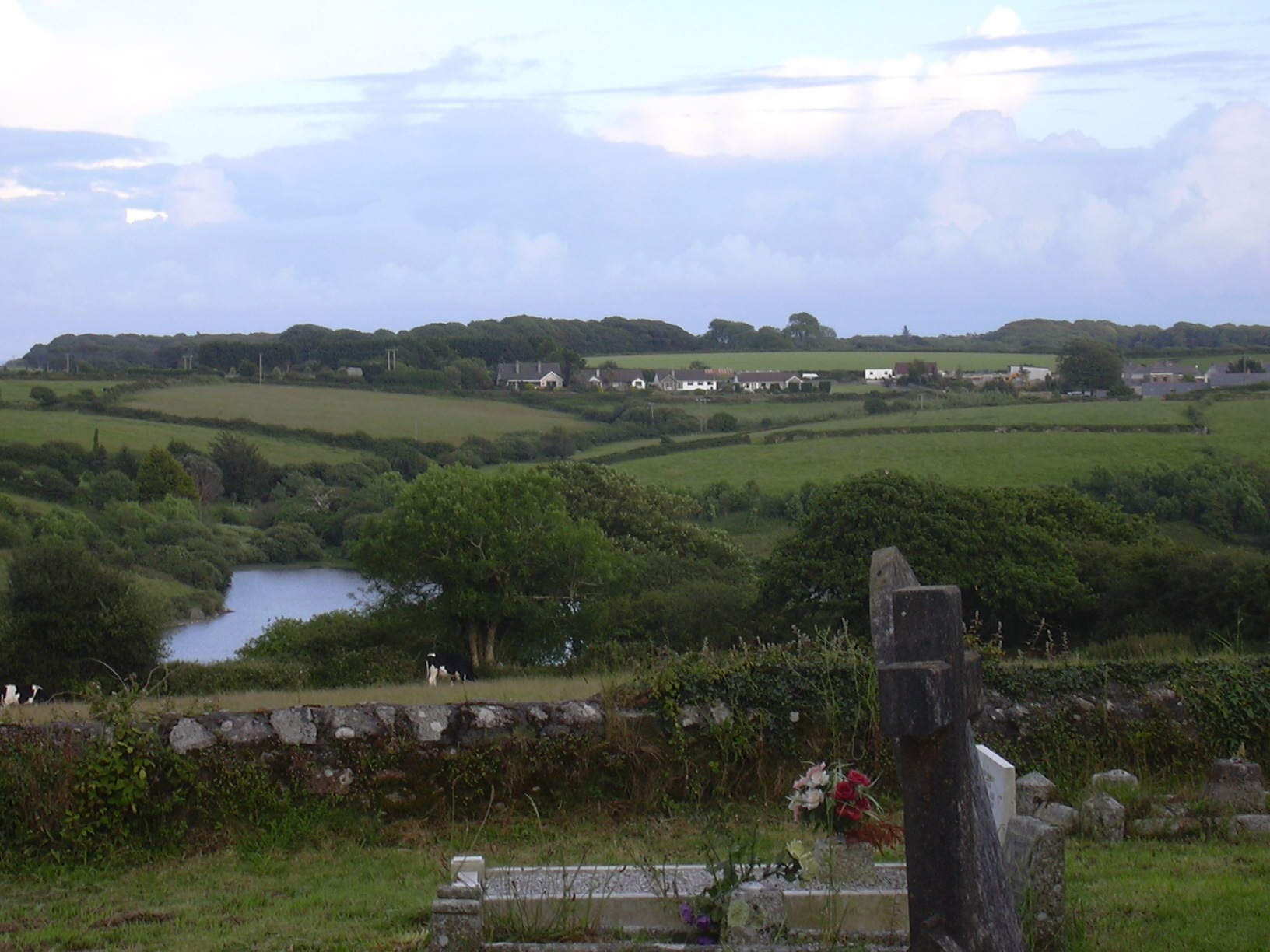
View of Lamanva from Mabe churchyard

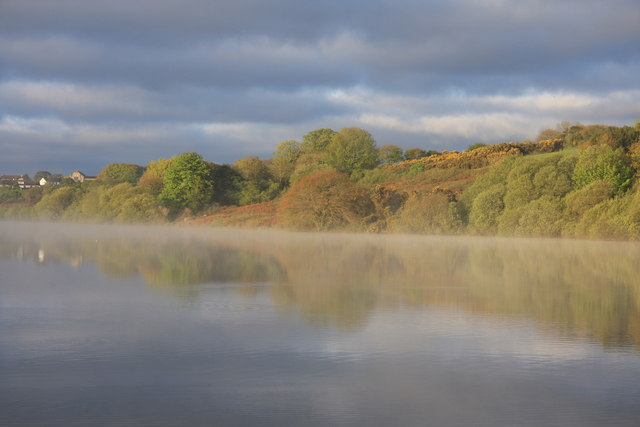
Misty Argal

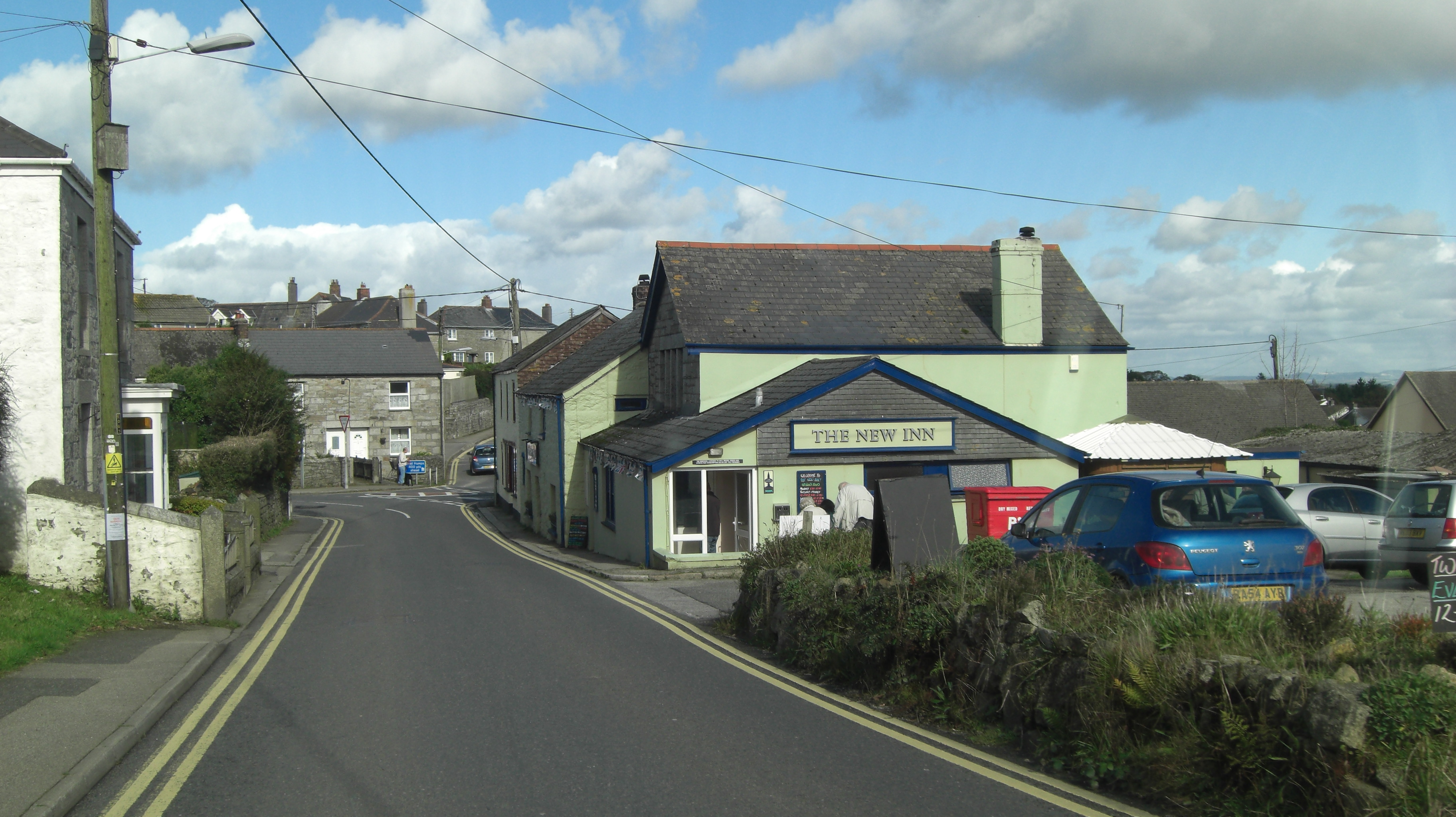
The New Inn, Church Road

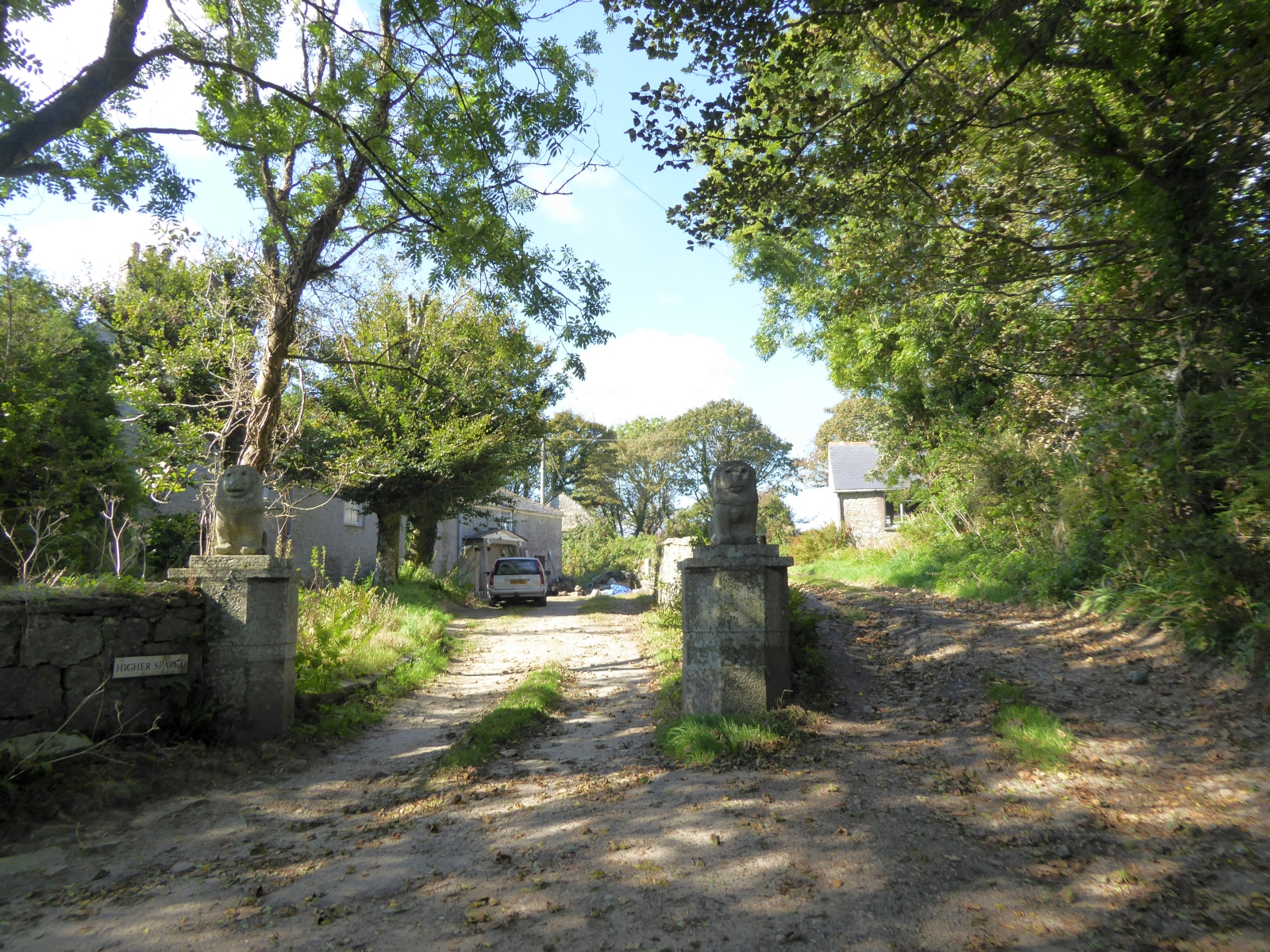
Higher Spargo

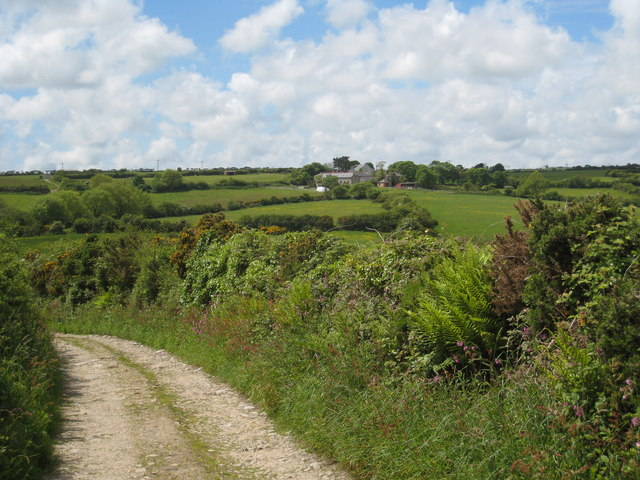
Halvasso to Higher Spargo

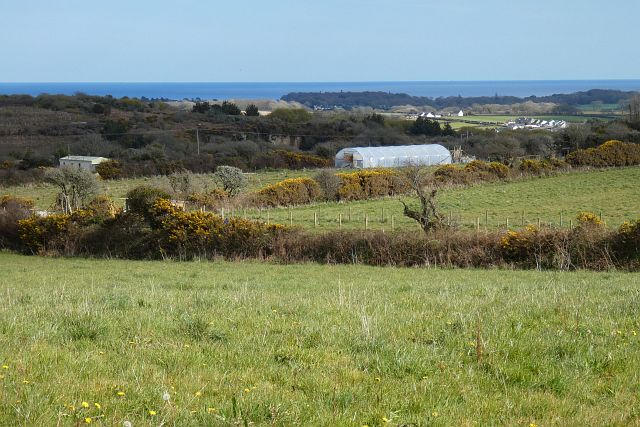
View over Falmouth Bay from Mabe
