= St Laud's Church, Mabe =

Church in Cornwall, England

Church of Saint Laudus, Mabe
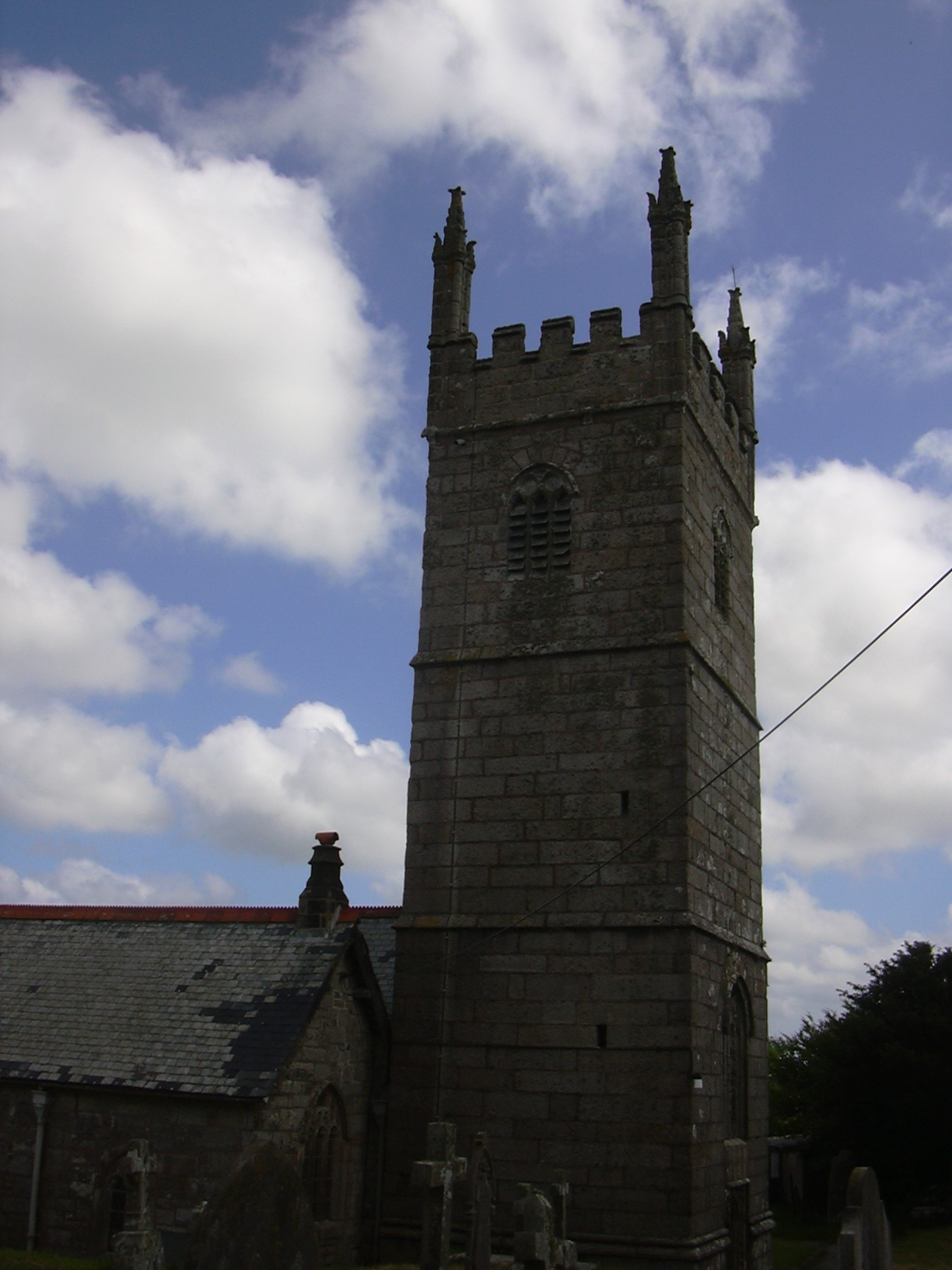
- The 15th-century tower of the Church of Saint Laudus.
- Church of Saint Laudus, Mabe
- 50.1499°N 5.1404°W
- Location: Mabe, Cornwall, England
- Denomination: Anglican

History
- Status: Parish church

Architecture
- Architectural type: Church
- Style: Gothic, Gothic Revival

Specifications
- Materials: Rubble with granite dressings Slate roofs

Administration
- District: Diocese of Truro

Listed Building – Grade II*
- Official name: Church of Saint Laud
- Designated: 10 July 1957
- Reference no.: 1328122

The Church of Saint Laudus (variant: Mabe Church) is an active parish church in Mabe, Cornwall, England, UK, originally built in the 15th century and dedicated to the sixth-century Saint Laudus of Coutances. It is part of the Church of England Diocese of Truro. Struck by lightning in the 19th century, much of it had to be rebuilt, though parts of the original church remain. It has been a Grade II* listed building since 10 July 1957.

St Laudus' church is part of the Parish of Mabe with Ponsanooth and both are open, inclusive churches.

== Current status ==
The church remains an active parish church with at least one service each week. It is now part of a larger benefice, sharing a single vicar with St Michael and All Angels, Ponsanooth. The benefice is part of the Deanery of Carnmarth South in the Diocese of Truro.

== Early history ==
Mabe was in early times a chapelry to Mylor and within the episcopal fief and peculiar deanery of Penryn. The old form "Lavabe" suggests that it is derived from "lan" and "Mabe" though old records always show the dedication as being to St Laud. In 1308 or 1309 Bishop Stapeldon consecrated the cemetery and held an ordination at the Chapel of St Laud (capelle Sancti Laudi) (it had been recorded as capella Sancti Laudi in 1302 and in 1340 appears as capella Sancti Laudy). The parochia Sancti Laudi is recorded as early as 1327. However, alternative sources state that the church was dedicated to St Mabe.

== Later history ==
The parish of Mabe was separated from Mylor during the 19th century. Only parts of the church, including the tower and porch, survived a February 1866 lightning strike. Most of the church was rebuilt in 1868, under the direction of Piers St. Aubyn, mainly through the financial contributions of Miss Williams of Falmouth and William Shilson of Tremough.

The rebuilt north aisle included reused 15th century light windows on the north wall and at each gable end. A stoup is located in the porch wall to the right of the doorway. The original octagonal, Gothic-panelled font is now buried under the church floor.

== Architecture ==
The church consists of a chancel, nave, and north and south aisles. While most of the original church was built in the 15th century, including the west tower, the north aisle, the south aisle, and the south porch, parts of the chancel are from the 13th or 14th century. The church's interior is made of plastered walls, octagonal piers, and arches. Most of the rest of the construction is composed of granite rubble with granite dressings.

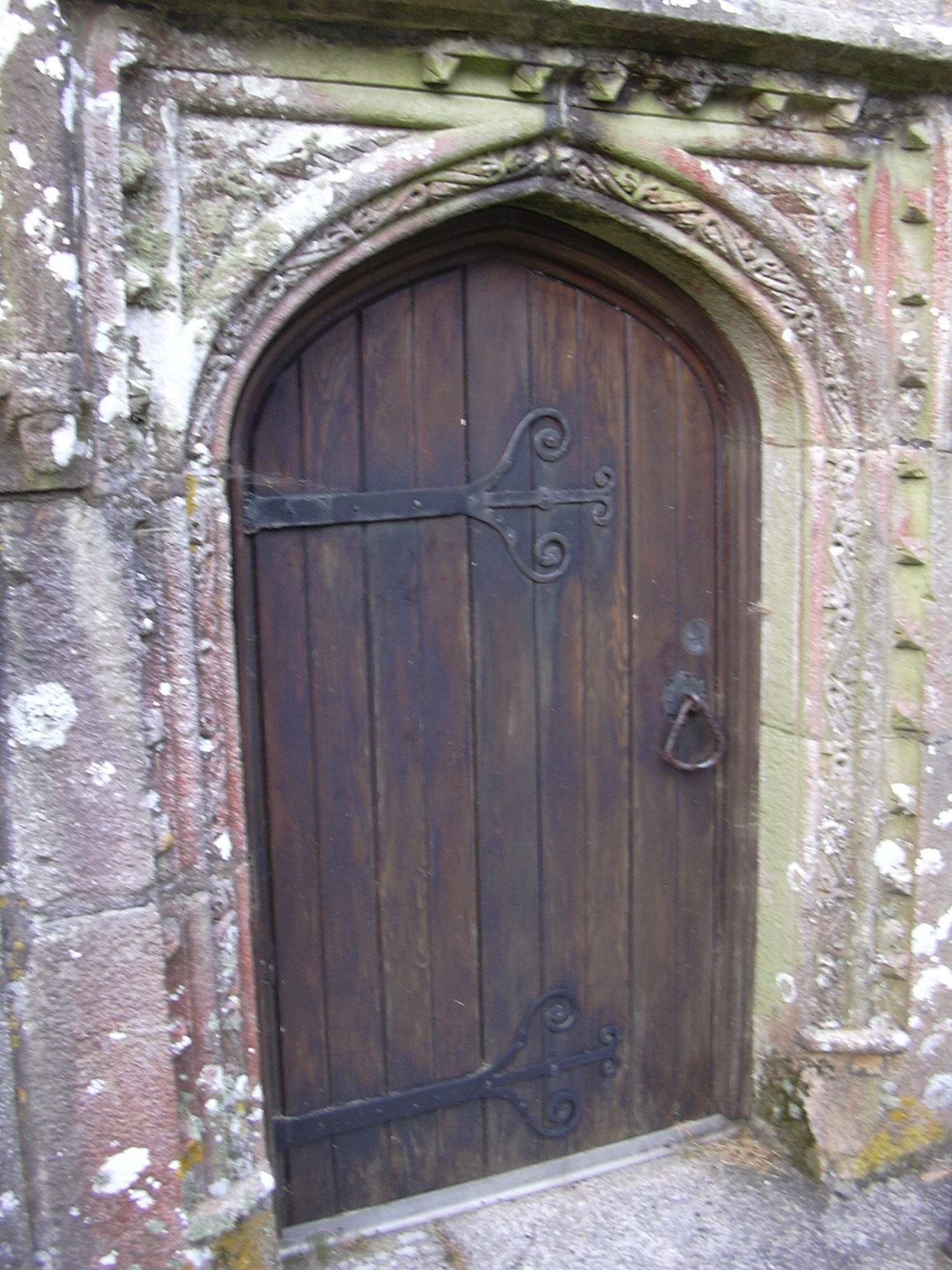
South door

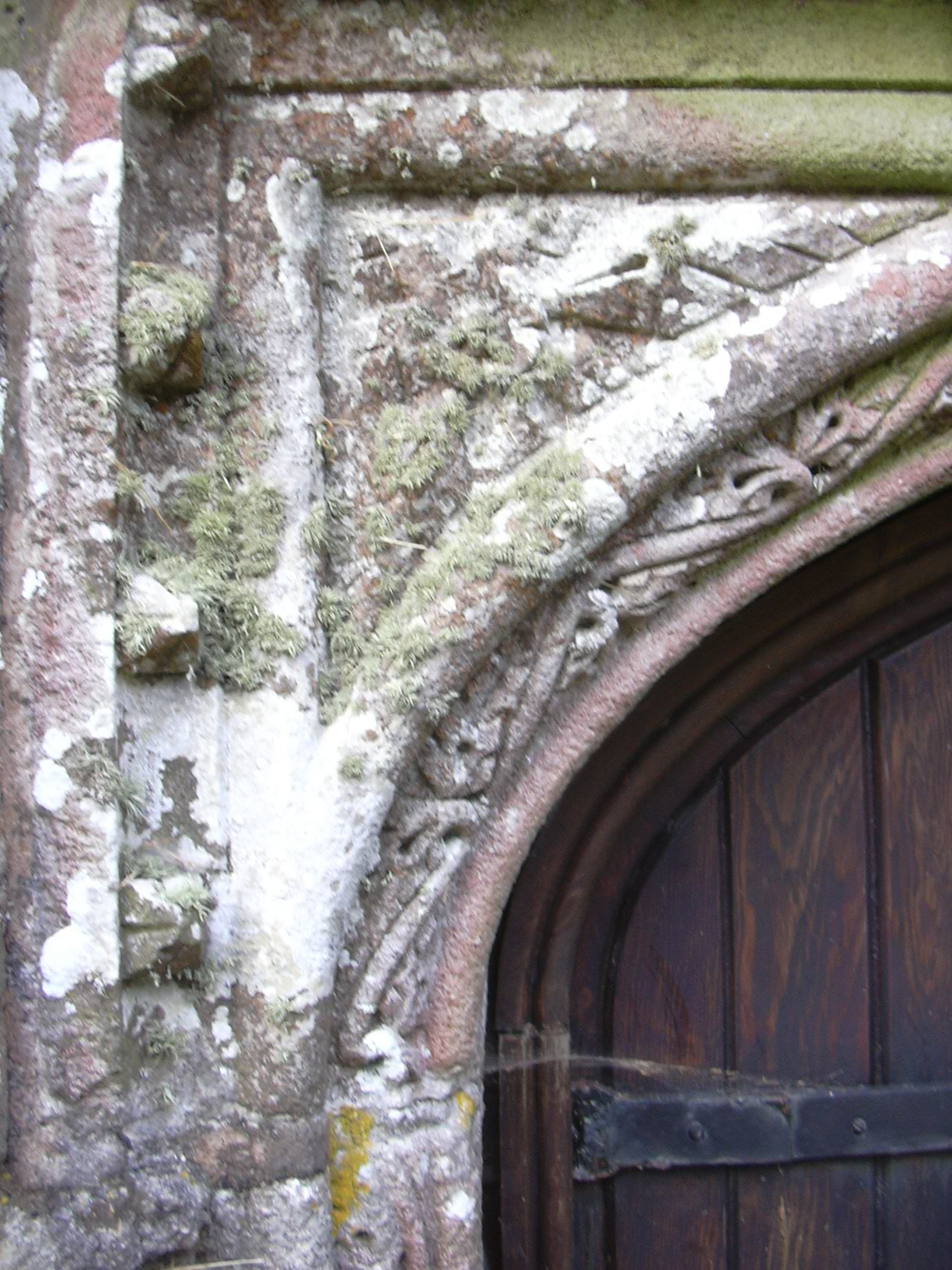
Detail of south door

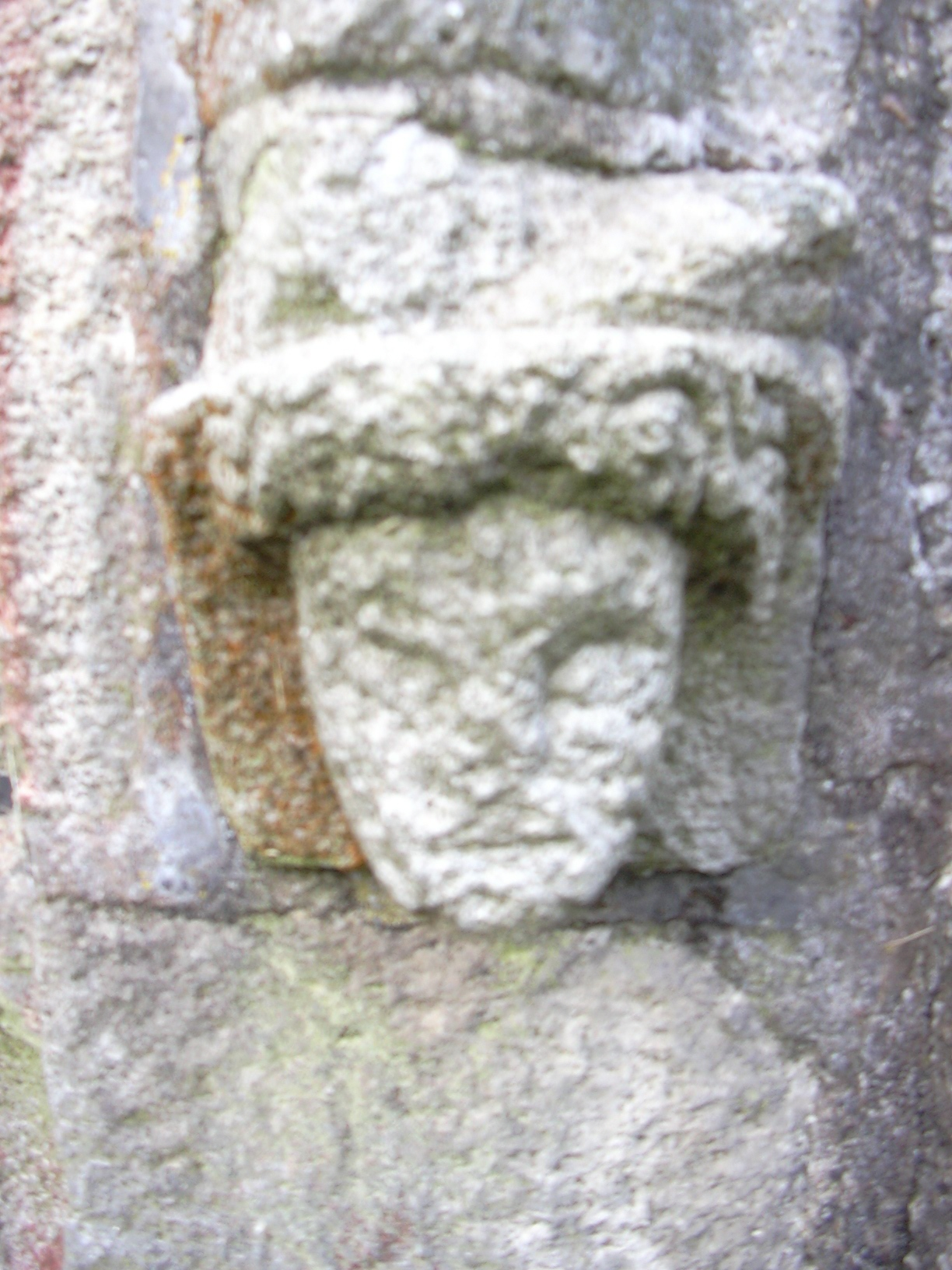
Portrait head on right of south door

The chief entrance is a south-facing porch with an inner and outer arch. The outer arch is ornamented with cable moulding and foliage. On one of the spandrels of the inner arch, which is made of Caen stone, is the monogram i h c, while on another can be found an encircled Greek cross. An arched west doorway includes carved moulding and carved heads are used as label stops. A priest's doorway to the right of the stair projection is small and rounded. The arcades are characterized by granite arches supported on granite pillars.

The nave and chancel are under one roof. The roof is both arch-braced and wind-braced. The Delabole slate roofs have gable ends. The rood stair projection leads to the south wall. The tower and the south aisle are granite ashlar. The unbuttressed west tower is embattled and includes crocket pinnacles over the cornice.

The Perpendicular windows are mostly of the 3-light variety, though there is a 4-light east window. A traceried Perpendicular window is located above a doorway while other traceried windows are located at the church's upper stage. The chancel's east window is adorned with bosses.

== Organ ==
In 1920, a new organ was inaugurated in the church. It is a two-manual instrument with pedals, with 10 stops.

== Bells ==
In 1870 it was recorded that of the church's four or five bells cast in 1744, only one was still sound. At least four new bells were cast for the church in 1876 by the firm of John Warner & Sons, these survive as the back four of the present ring of six bells, hung for change ringing. The front two bells were cast by John Taylor & Co of Loughborough in 1930.

== Churchyard ==
The church and its churchyard measure 0.164 hectares (1 rood 25 perches). The churchyard contains a menhir and several gravestones that are of historical significance.

On 24 November 1988, several nearby structures became Grade II listed buildings. These include: the chest tomb and three headstones to the Rail Family located 8 m (26 ft) southwest of the church, the chest tomb that adjoins the church's north wall, consisting of a slate lid, that is otherwise buried, the cross located approximately 1 m (3.3 ft) southwest of the church's porch, the headstone located approximately 3 m (9.8 ft) east of the church, the 1774 granite headstone dedicated to "MH" located approximately 0.5 m (1.6 ft) south of the church, the stone monolith dating probably to pre-Norman conquest of England and located approximately 10 m (33 ft) south of the church's tower, and the Wills granite headstone slab circa 1840, located approximately 4 m (13 ft) south of the church.

== Gallery ==
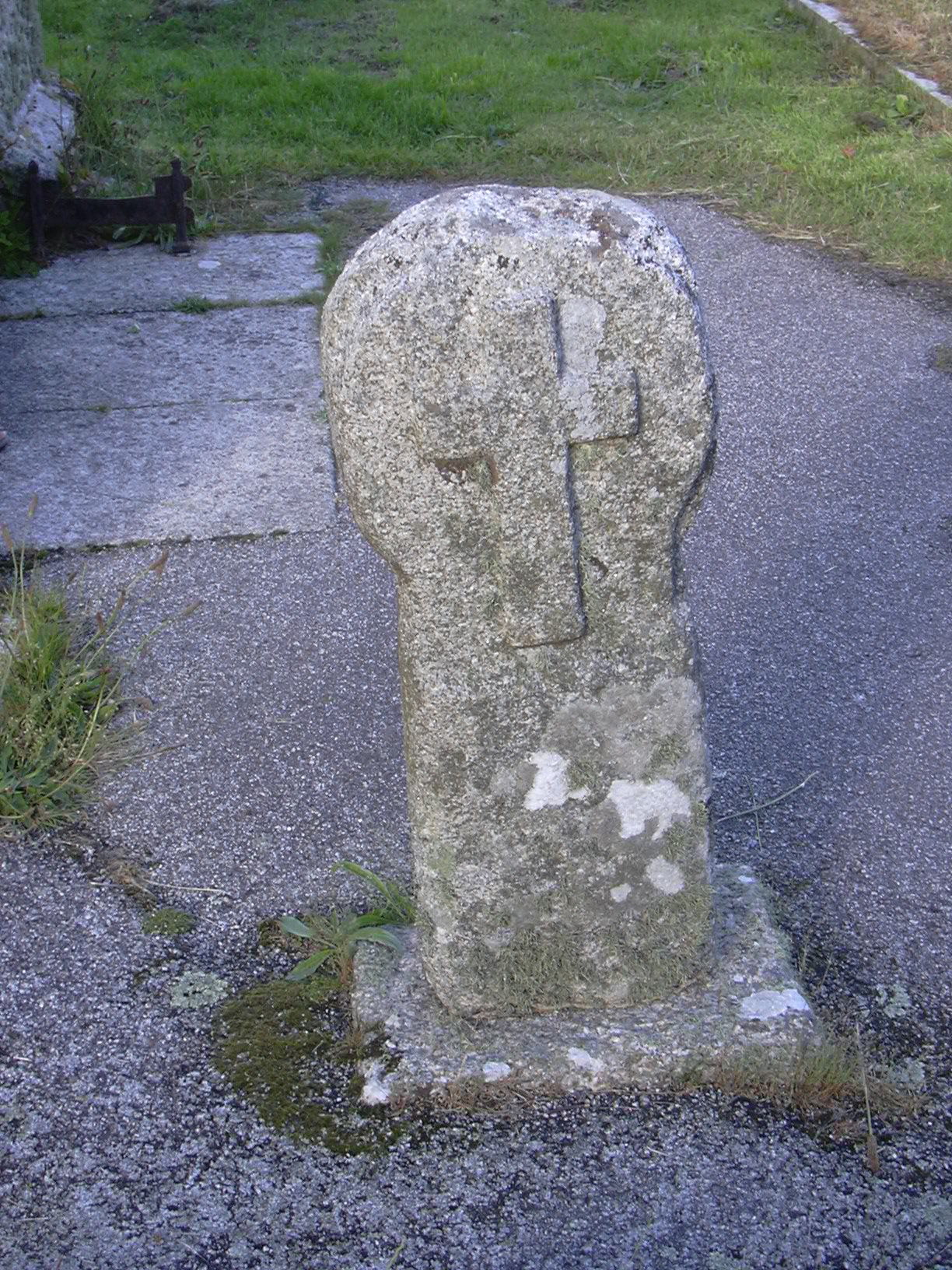
Reworked Celtic cross near west door

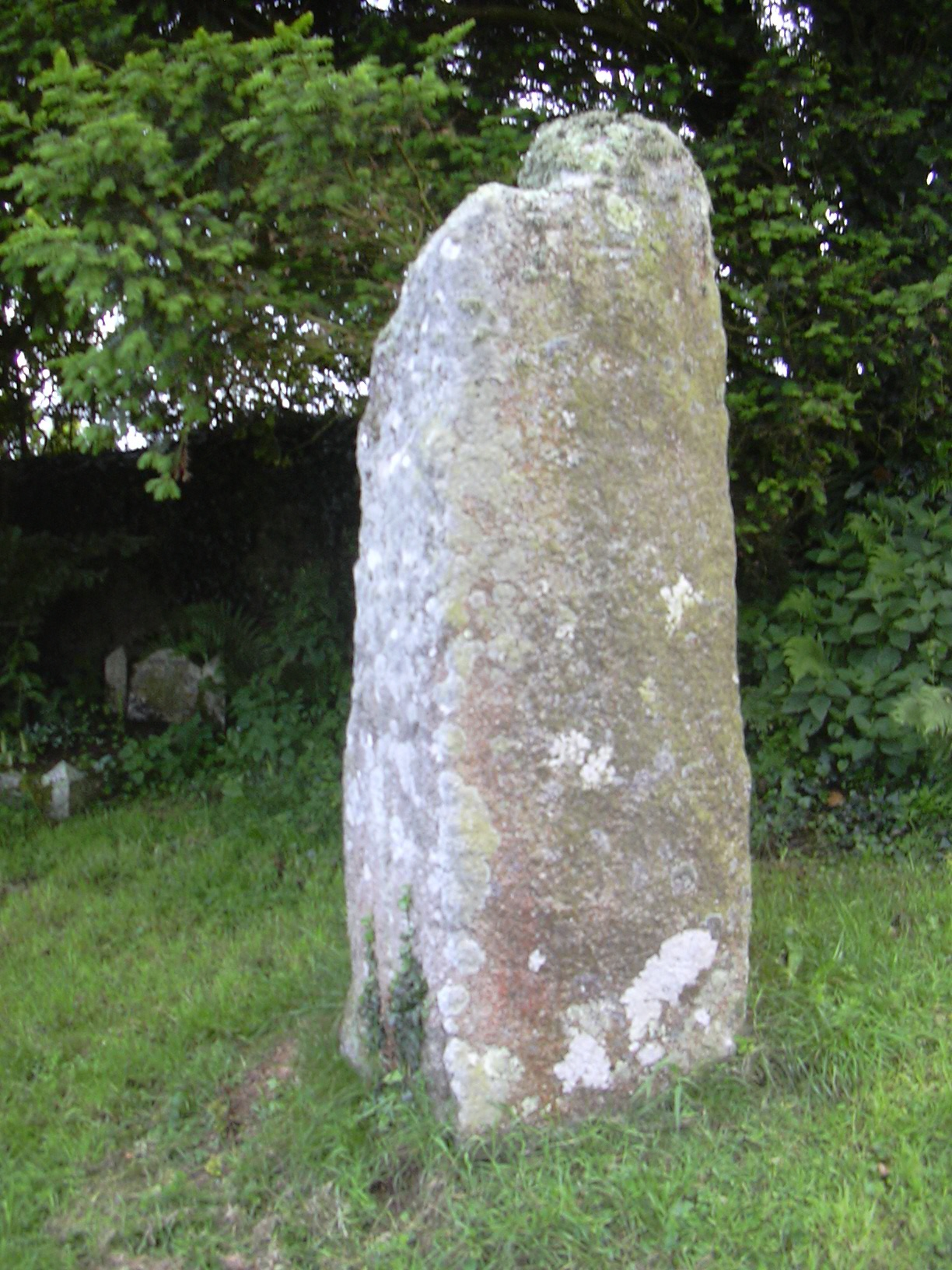
Menhir in churchyard

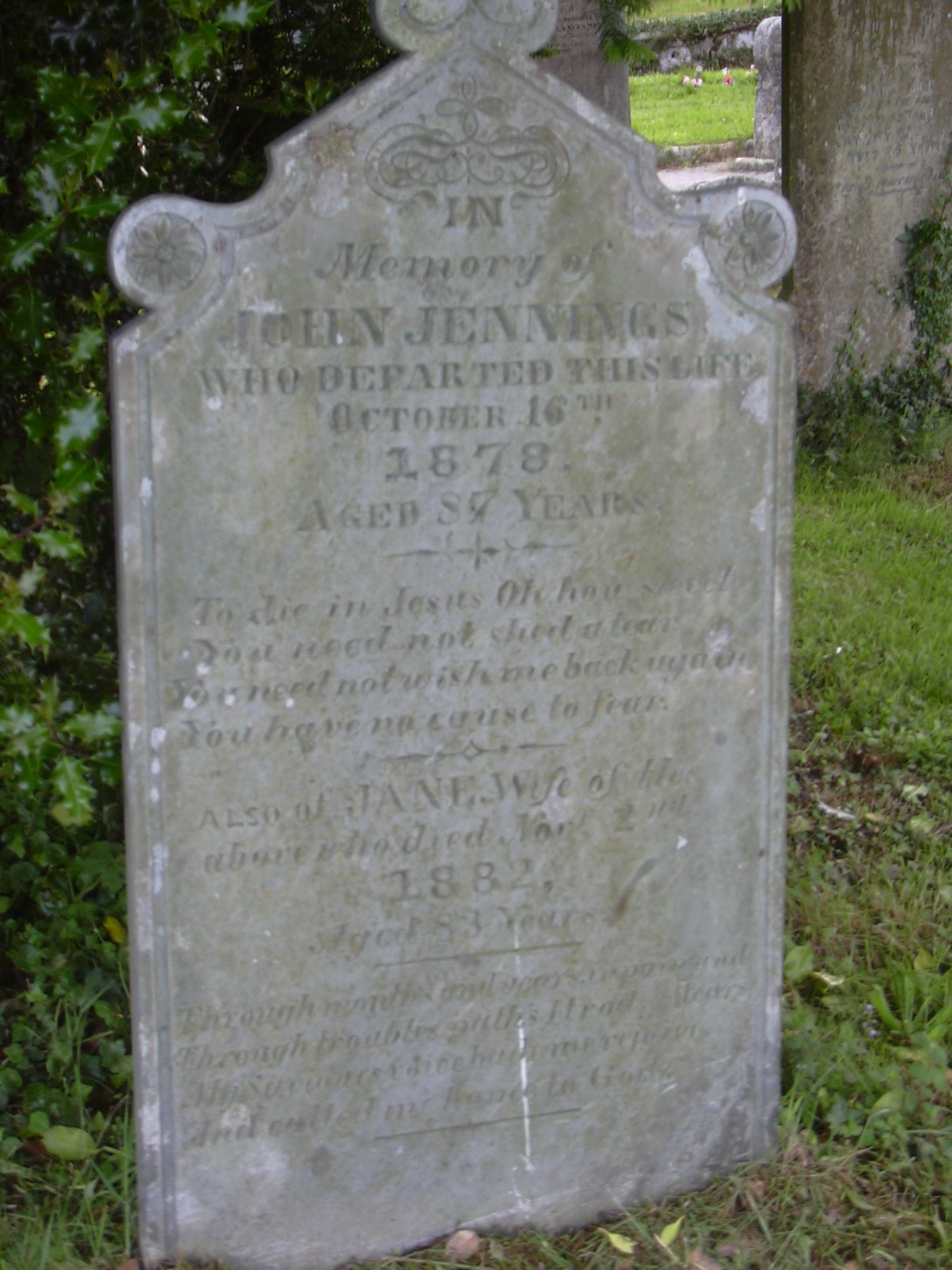
Gravestone of John Jennings (died 1878) in churchyard
