= Ponsanooth =

Coordinates: 50.19700°N 5.14296°W

Ponsanooth: Cornish: Pons an Woodh
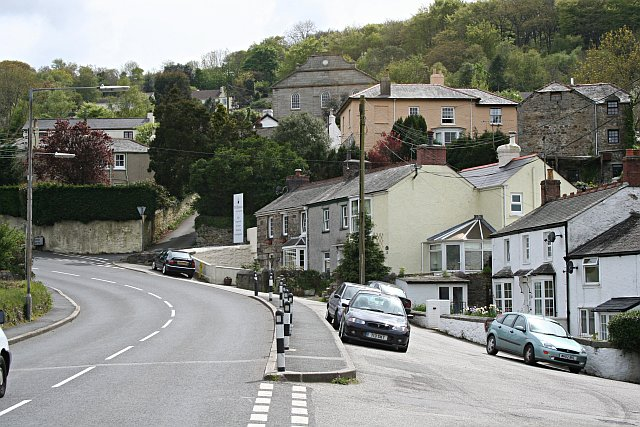

- Location within Cornwall
- Area: 0.4175 km^{2} (0.1612 sq mi)
- Population: 1,184 (2019 estimate)
  - Density: 2,836/km^{2} (7,350/sq mi)
- OS grid reference: SW755375
- Civil parish: Ponsanooth
- District: Cornwall
- Shire county: Cornwall
- Region: South West
- Country: England
- Sovereign state: United Kingdom
- Post town: Truro
- Postcode district: TR3
- Dialling code: 01872
- Police: Devon and Cornwall
- Fire: Cornwall
- Ambulance: South Western

Ponsanooth (Cornish: Pons an Woodh, meaning "bridge of the goose") is a village and civil parish in Cornwall, England, United Kingdom. It is about 4 mi (6.4 km) southeast of Redruth and 2.5 mi (4.0 km) northwest of Penryn on the A393 road Redruth to Falmouth road. In 2019 it had an estimated population of 1184.

== Description ==
The church of St Michael and All Angels is now part of a larger benefice, sharing a single vicar with Mabe. Also the village has a shop which includes a post office, village hall, primary school and a public house called The Stag Pub.

The River Kennall runs nearby: in the 19th century, this river worked a flour mill and a number of gunpowder mills, machinery at a foundry, and a paper mill. The gunpowder mills supplied many of the mines of west Cornwall until 1910, by which time gunpowder had been largely replaced by high explosives. The site of one of the ruined mills is now within a Nature Reserve.

== Civil parish ==
Until 1 April 2021 the civil parish was called St Gluvias which does not include the Penryn suburb St Gluvias. The parish population at the 2011 census was 1,668.

== Cornish wrestling ==
Cornish wrestling tournaments, for prizes, were held in Ponsanooth in the 1800s and 1900s.

== Notable people ==
Botanist Frederick Hamilton Davey (died 23 September 1915) was born at Ponsanooth and was buried in the Wesleyan cemetery there.

== See also ==
- Cornish Yarg
