= Cornwall Services =

English service station

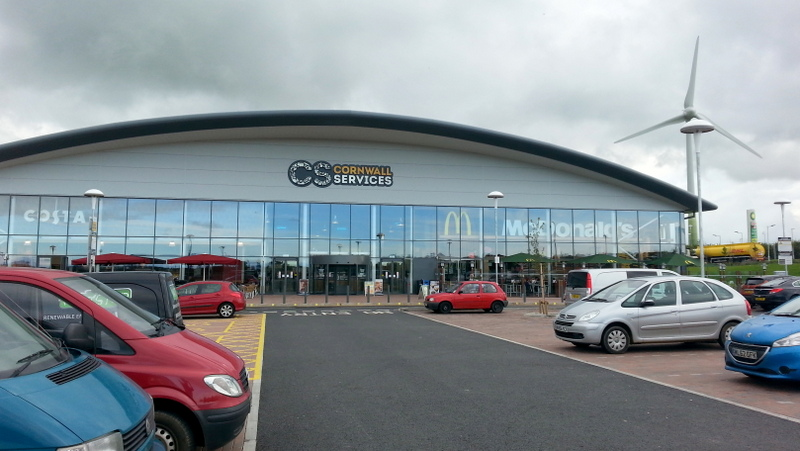
- Cornwall Services in 2014

- Location within Cornwall

Information
- County: Cornwall
- Road: A30
- Coordinates: 50.4262°N 4.8162°W
- Date opened: 1 July 2014
- Fuel: Shell
- Website: cornwall-services.com

Cornwall Services is a service station on the A30 near Bodmin, Cornwall, England.

== History ==
After construction began in early 2013, Cornwall Services opened on 1 July 2014 as part of the first phase of a wider project. It served 600,000 vehicles in its first year of operation, with this number doubling to 1.2 million vehicles annually by 2024; more than 10 million people went to the services in its first 10 years.

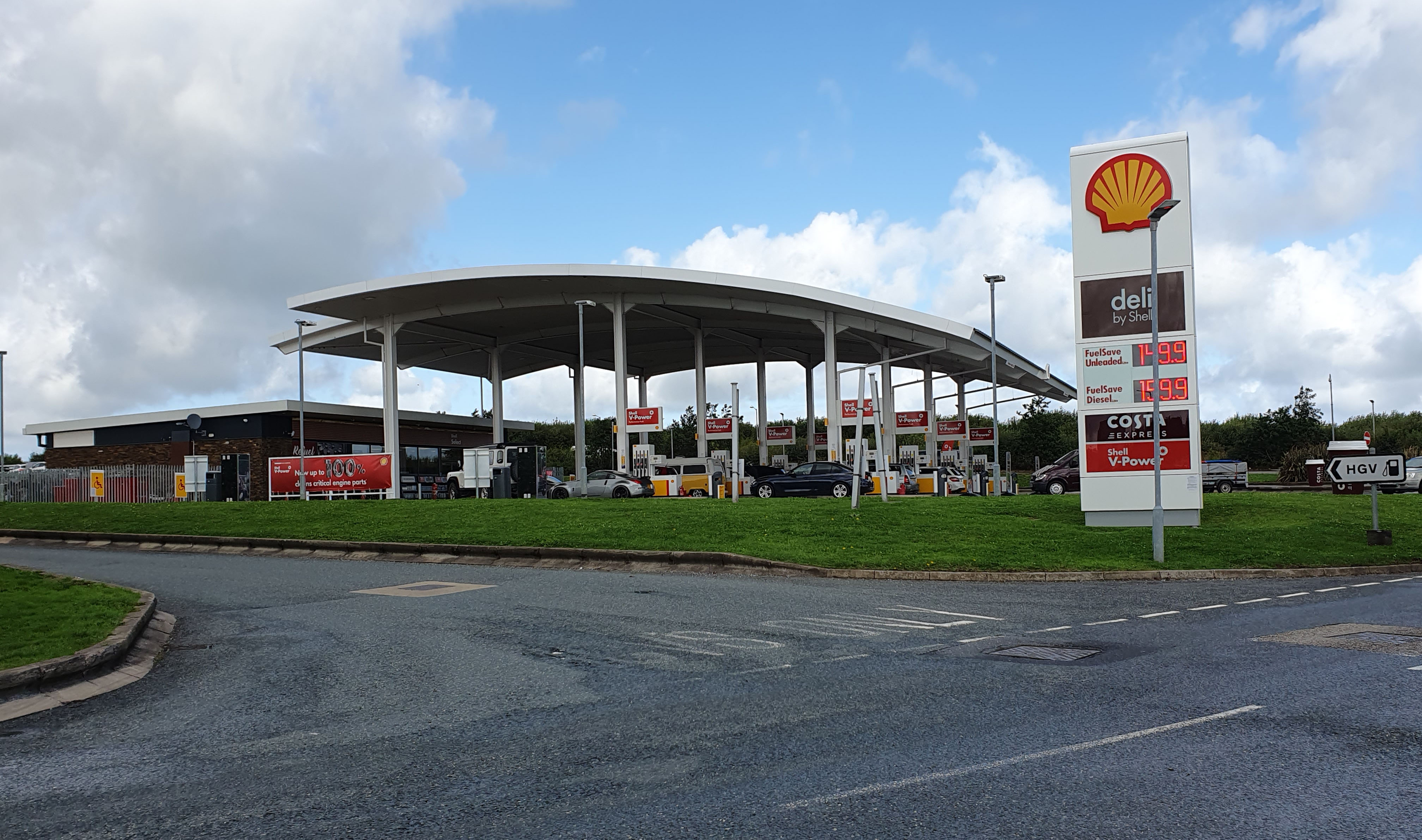
The Shell Cornish Gateway fuel station at the services.

At the time of its opening the service station only had two big brands: Costa Coffee and McDonald's. Other brands which have opened there since include Greggs and Subway in 2020 and Co-op in 2021. There are also a number of shops at the services, including Saltrock which opened in 2019 and Mountain Warehouse which opened in 2022. Additionally, the service station is home to some local businesses such as Mango Surfing, Miami's, Rowe's Cornish Bakers and Teddy Freddy's Barber Hut. In 2015, the public Quick Charger for electric vehicles (EVs) in Cornwall was installed by Ecotricity at the services. It was opened on 16 January as part of an exhibition of Kia, Nissan, Mitsubishi, Peugeot and Renault's latest EVs hosted by ecodrive at the services. In 2023, the service station's fuel station was rebranded from BP to Shell Cornish Gateway. The services became the home of Cornwall's first Taco Bell in 2023. GRIDSERVE opened a UK-first EV charging station at the services in 2023, including 12 chargers and a solar canopy.

Phase 2 of the services was confirmed in 2015 on the services' first anniversary, with the construction of a 70-bed hotel with a restaurant, a tourist information centre, a dog walking area and an outdoor picnic and play area starting in early 2016. Between its opening and this announcement, two leisure facilities opened at the site in May 2015: a Clip 'n 'Climb climbing centre and a soft play centre. However, the Clip 'n' Climb centre was dismantled and moved to a holiday park near Newquay in 2021. Work on Cornwall's first Holiday Inn Express began at the services in early 2019, with a hotel including 71 rooms and a bar and eating area being built to the left of the main building.

In 2021, the service station was awarded Tripadvisor's Travellers' Choice Award for the second consecutive year, an award that is given to the top 10% of all Tripadvisor listings. A 2024 study revealed that the services' McDonald's restaurant was the highest rated by Google reviewers in the UK, with 52.42% leaving five-star reviews.
