= Nicholas Pocock (historian) =

English academic and cleric (1814–1897)

Nicholas Pocock (1814–1897) was an English academic and cleric, known as a historical writer.

== Life ==
Born at Falmouth, Cornwall in January 1814, he was eldest son of Nicholas Pocock of Falmouth and grandson of Nicholas Pocock the marine painter; Isaac Pocock and William Innes Pocock were his uncles. He was educated at a private school in Devon by the Rev. John Manly, and on 3 February 1831 matriculated at The Queen's College, Oxford, as Michel exhibitioner; in 1834 he was elected scholar. He graduated B.A. that year with a first class in the final mathematical school, and a second class in literae humaniores In 1835 he won the Johnson mathematical scholarship, and the senior mathematical scholarship in 1836. In 1837 he graduated M.A.

In 1838 Pocock became Michel fellow of Queen's, where later he was mathematical lecturer. He had a reputation as mathematical tutor, and among his pupils was Bartholomew Price; he was public examiner in mathematics in 1839, 1844, and 1848, and in literae humaniores in 1842 and 1852. He was ordained deacon in 1838 and priest in 1855, but never held any ecclesiastical preferment. He married in 1852 Edith, a daughter of James Cowles Prichard, and moved to Clifton, Bristol, where he spent the remainder of his life with the exception of a year when he was in charge of Codrington College in Barbados. He died at Clifton on 4 March 1897, survived by his widow, sons and daughters.

== Works ==
Pocock did much to undermine the traditional Protestant view of the Reformation. His major work was his edition of Gilbert Burnet's History of the Reformation, published in seven volumes by the Clarendon Press in 1864–65. The seventh volume consisted of Pocock's discussion on Burnet's authorities, sources, and errors.

In 1847 Pocock edited the third edition of Henry Hammond's Miscellaneous Theological Works, and in 1852 published The First two Books of Euclid … with additional figures. Later he devoted himself almost exclusively to the history of the Reformation in England. The series Records of the Reformation issued by the Clarendon Press in 1871 was stopped at the year 1535, because of poor sales: and Pocock's collections remained mostly in manuscript, though some were published in Troubles connected with the Prayer-Book of 1549 (Camden Society, 1884).

Pocock also edited, for the Camden Society, Nicholas Harpsfield's Treatise of the Pretended Divorce of Catherine of Aragon (1878). Other works included:

- The Ritual Commission, Bristol, 1872.
- The Abolition of the Thirty-nine Articles, 3 parts, London, 1874.
- The Principles of the Reformation, London, 1875.
- The Recovery from the Principles of the Reformation, London, 1877.

He contributed articles on Reformation history to the Saturday Review, the Union Review, Quarterly Review, Church Quarterly Review and English Historical Review, and to The Athenæum and The Academy. He also wrote for the Dictionary of National Biography.

== Notes ==
Attribution

This article incorporates text from a publication now in the public domain: Lee, Sidney, ed. (1901). "Pocock, Nicholas (1814-1897)". Dictionary of National Biography (1st supplement). Vol. 3. London: Smith, Elder & Co.
