= Robert Barclay Fox =

Falmouth businessman and Conservative Party politician (1873–1934)

Robert Barclay Fox (24 July 1873 – 22 April 1934) was a Falmouth businessman and Conservative Party politician in Cornwall. He was known as Barclay Fox.

Fox was born the son of Robert Fox (1845–1915) and his wife Ellen Mary Bassett.

He was the grandson of another "Robert Barclay Fox" (1817–1855) and was also known as Barclay Fox, one of the influential local Quaker family of Fox, of Falmouth, Cornwall. He inherited "Grove Hill" and Penjerrick Garden, that his grandfather and great-grandfather had developed.

== Education ==
He was educated at Winchester College and Magdalen College, Oxford.

== Family business ==
He became the senior partner in the conglomerate business, G.C. Fox & Co (originally a Shipping Agent). He was a director of the Falmouth Dock Board and Consul for Denmark and Vice-Consul for Norway, Germany and Finland. The King of Norway awarded him a knighthood of the order of St. Olav.

== Local politics ==
He served as a Cornwall County Councillor and as a governor of a number of local schools, and of the School of Art. He was High Sheriff of Cornwall in 1920. He was the chairman of the Penryn & Falmouth Unionist Association.

== Other interests ==
Barclay Fox supported the Royal Cornwall Polytechnic Society, like many of his family. He was its Vice-president 1909–1912. Its Annual Report 1934 included a photographic portrait of him.

Barclay Fox also followed his family in his interest in horticulture and continued his father, grandfather and great-grandfather's development of Penjerrick.

== Marriage and death ==
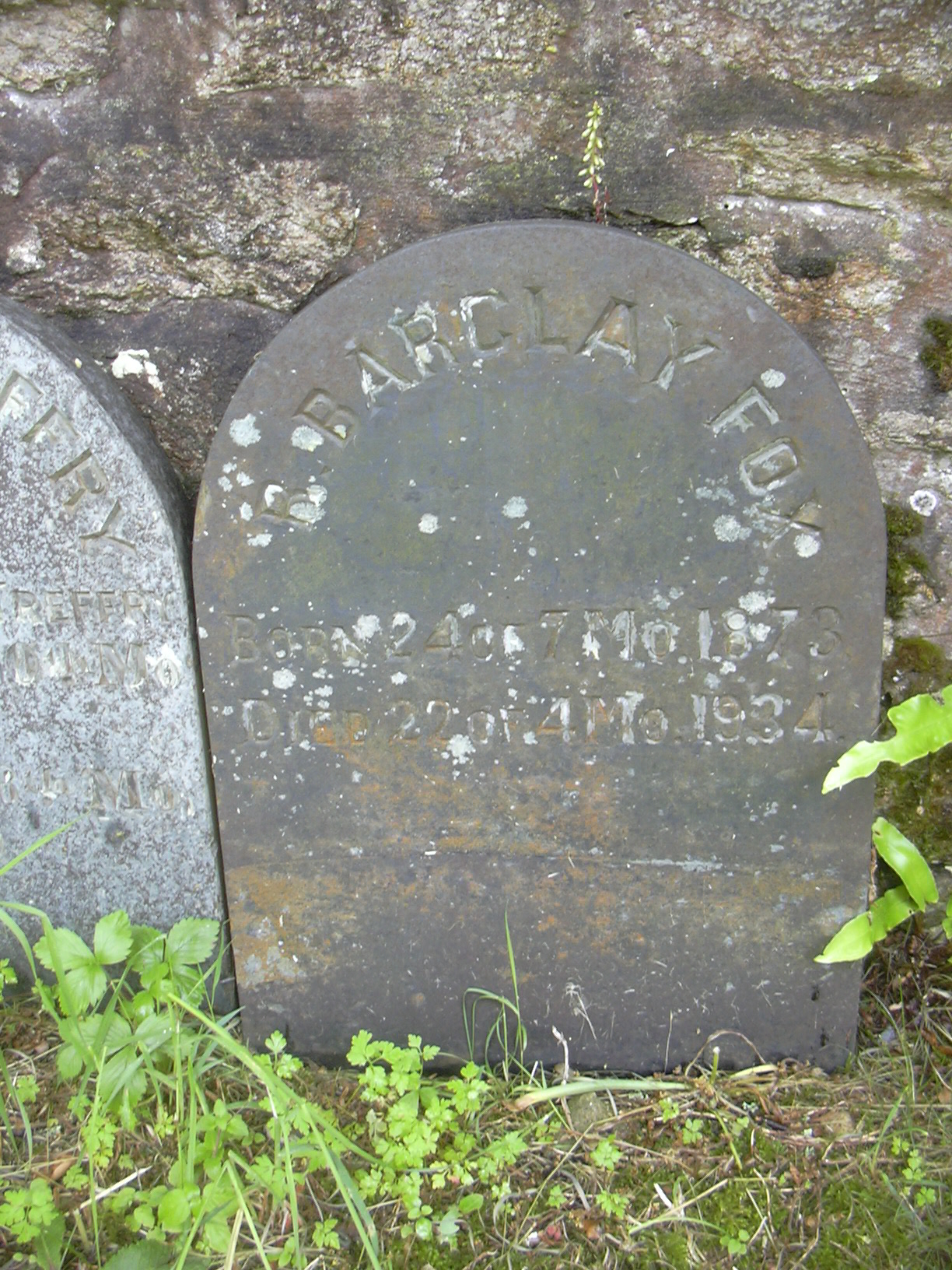
R. Barclay Fox's gravestone at the Quaker Burial Ground, Budock, near Falmouth

Barclay Fox married his cousin, Margaret (Peggy) Bassett. His sister, Naomi Bassett Fox was born on 1 February 1886. Margaret and Naomi were members of a Women's Suffrage society in Falmouth affiliated to National Union of Women's Suffrage Societies. Naomi was its Secretary.

Margaret Fox died in 1928.

Barclay Fox died on 22 April 1934, aged 61.
