= Elizabeth Philp =

English singer, music educator and composer

Elizabeth Philp, from an 1880 publication

Elizabeth Philp (1827 – 26 November 1885) was an English singer, music educator and composer.

Philp was born in Falmouth, Cornwall, the eldest daughter of geographer James Philp. She was a protegee of Charlotte Cushman, and studied harmony with German composer Ferdinand Hiller at Cologne. She published a collection How to Sing an English Ballad including sixty songs. In London she was a neighbor and friend of Catherine Hogarth, and part of a community of musicians and writers there.

Philp died in London in 1885, aged 58 years, from liver disease and was buried on the eastern side of Highgate Cemetery.

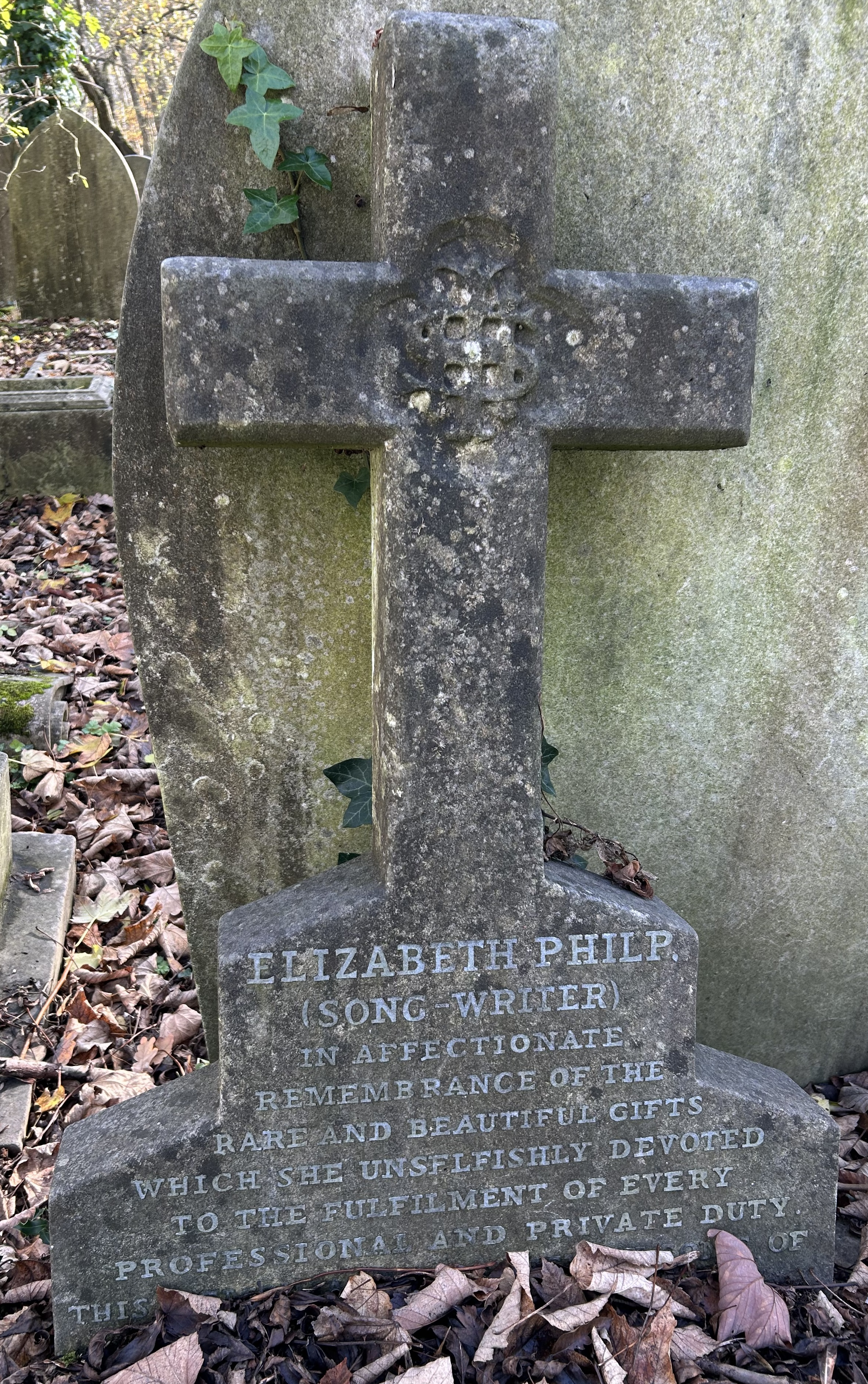
Grave of Elizabeth Philp in Highgate Cemetery

== Works ==
Philp composed songs and song cycles. Selected works include:

- Alone (Text: James Russell Lowell)
- Good night, beloved (Text: Henry Wadsworth Longfellow)
- Inclusion (Text: Elizabeth Barrett Browning)
- Insufficiency (Text: Elizabeth Barrett Browning)
- O moonlight deep and tender (in Six Songs) (Text: James Russell Lowell)
- Serenade (in Six Songs) (Text: James Russell Lowell)
- Sweetest eyes (Text: Elizabeth Barrett Browning)
- Tell me, the summer stars (Text: Edwin Arnold)
- The sea hath its pearls (Text: Henry Wadsworth Longfellow after Heinrich Heine)
- The violets of spring (Text: Elizabeth Philp after Heinrich Heine)
- When all the world is young (Text: Charles Kingsley)
