= Peter Pook =

British writer

John Anthony Miller (25 April 1918 – 8 September 1978), better known by his pseudonym Peter Pook, was a British author of humorous novels.

== Biography ==
Born John Anthony Miller on 25 April 1918, in Falmouth, Cornwall, he grew up in Southsea, Hampshire and was educated at Portsmouth Grammar School. At various times in his life he was a boxer, footballer, bank clerk, diver, Royal Marine, Indian Navy Lieutenant, antique dealer, schoolmaster, lecturer and author. His first novel, Banking on Form, was published and reprinted by Robert Hale in March 1962, when he was forty-four, but his sense of humour won him a national literary competition when he was only nine. His pen name was from his mother as she was born a Pook and came from a Portsmouth family which had its origins in Devon. Peter Pook died suddenly on 8 September 1978.

== Writing ==
Writing between 1960 and 1978, Pook produced a series of twenty-three "autobiographical" novels in which the real events of his life were mingled with fanciful situations, and Pook himself is presented as an amiable dunderhead who is taken advantage of at every turn. After the first book in the series, Banking on Form, every subsequent volume has Pook's name in the title: Pook in Boots, Pook in Business, Pook Sahib, etc.

Pook's first novel, Banking on Form, was well received. The Daily Telegraph reviewer wrote that it "provides plenty of amusement". Another reviewer compared it with Richard Gordon's Doctor at Sea, saying "Mr Pook takes the lid off banking quite irreverently, often hilariously, but never offensively ... There is nothing deep about the humour but I cannot recall many modern novels in which it is so well sustained." An Australian reviewer considered Pook "an outstanding humorous writer", and wrote "it is a relief and a joy to find a book like .. Banking on Form .... wonderful fun."
Pook became The Daily Mirror reviewer's "favourite "funny ha-ha" author of many years' chortling", while a later reviewer of The Teacher's Hand-Pook found it a "very funny little book", and suggested that "many a teacher might do worse than to take a few tips from the various Pookisms."

Recurring themes in the books are Pook's obsession with physical culture and sport, his military career in the Royal Marines, his teaching and banking careers, overseas travels, his ambition to be an actor and his own writing career. The earlier books are totally light-hearted, though in some of the later works, particularly those depicting the war years, occasional glimpses of grim reality break in.

== Bibliography ==
- Banking on Form (1962)
- Pook in Boots (1963)
- Pook in Business (1963)
- Pook Sahib (1965)
- Bwana Pook (1965)
- Professor Pook (1966)
- Banker Pook Confesses (1967)
- Pook at College (1968)
- Pook and Partners (1969)
- Pook's Tender Years (1969)
- Playboy Pook (Oct 1970)
- Pook's Class War (1971)
- Pook's Tale of Woo (1972)
- Pook's Eastern Promise (1972)
- Beau Pook Proposes (1973)
- Pook's Tours (1974)
- The Teacher's Hand-Pook (1975)
- Gigolo Pook (1975)
- Pook's Love Nest (1976)
- Pook's China Doll (1977)
- Pook's Curiosity Shop (1977)
- Marine Pook Esquire (1978)
- Pook's Viking Virgins (1979)
