= St Michael and All Angels Church, Penwerris =

Church in Cornwall, England

Coordinates: 50°09′45″N 05°04′41″W

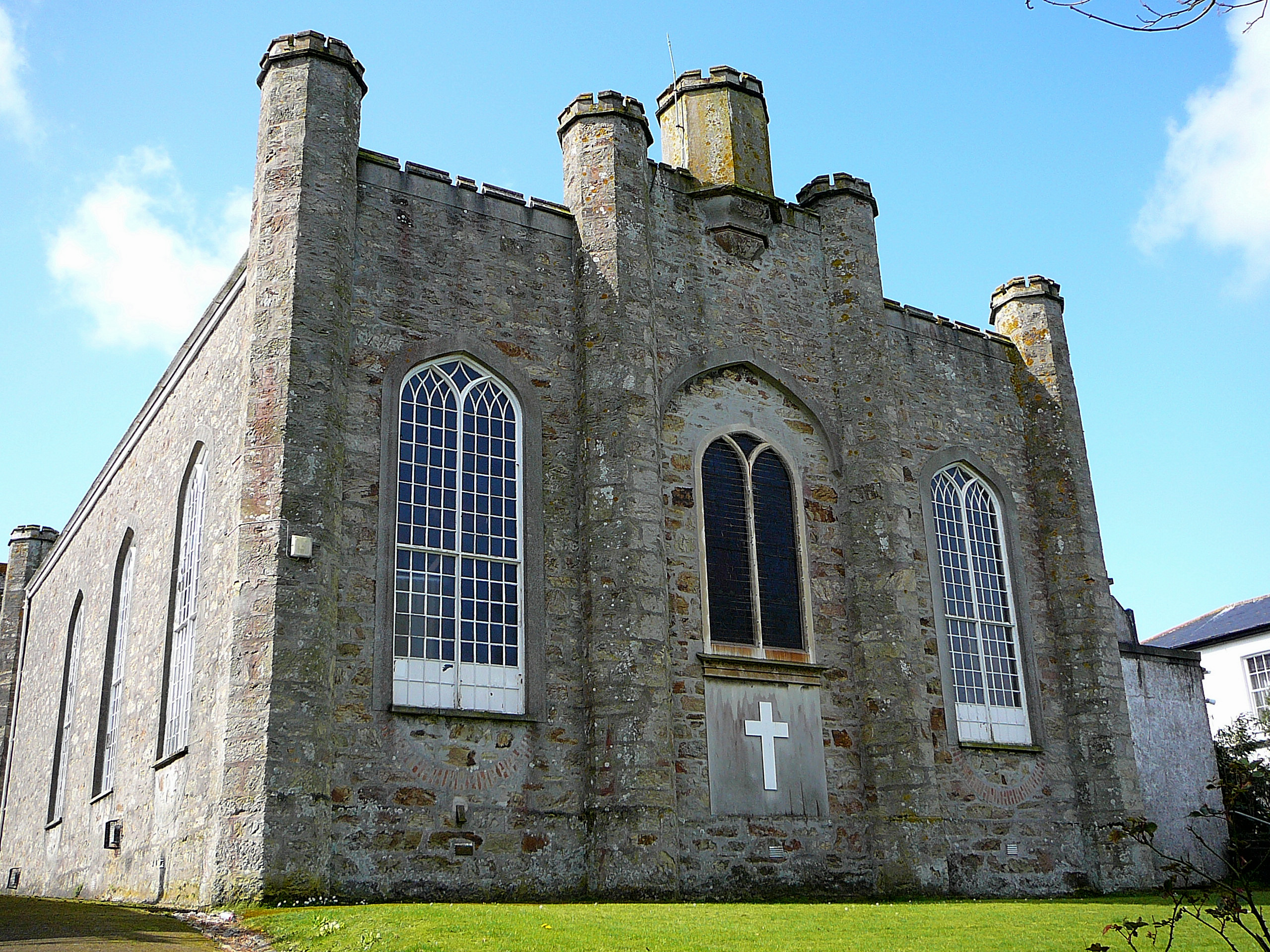
- St Michael and All Angels Church, Penwerris
- St Michael and All Angels Church, Penwerris
- Denomination: Church of England
- Churchmanship: Anglo-Catholic

History
- Dedication: St Michael and All Angels

Administration
- Province: Canterbury
- Diocese: Truro
- Parish: Penwerris, Cornwall

Clergy
- Priest: Revd Mark Terence Mesley SSC

St Michael and All Angels Church, Penwerris is a parish church of the Church of England located in Penwerris, near Falmouth, Cornwall. The church is Anglo-Catholic and under the care of the Bishop of Oswestry rather than the diocesan bishop.

The church was originally dedicated to the Holy Trinity, but this was later changed to St Michael & All Angels. It is a plain rectangular building of stone erected in 1827 and opened on 9 January 1828. It consists of a nave only and a western gallery. Penwerris only became a parish in 1848; until then it was part of the parish of Budock. St Michael and All Angels is a Grade II listed building; it was listed in 1973. The east chancel window was installed in 1908 and depicts the virtues Fortitude and Purity, as well as a pelican pricking itself to feed its young.

== Organ ==
The church has a two-manual pipe organ by Hele & Co dating from 1889. A specification of the organ can be found in the National Pipe Organ Register.
