= Penmere Manor Hotel, Cornwall =

Hotel in Cornwall, England

Coordinates: 50°08′54″N 5°05′21″W

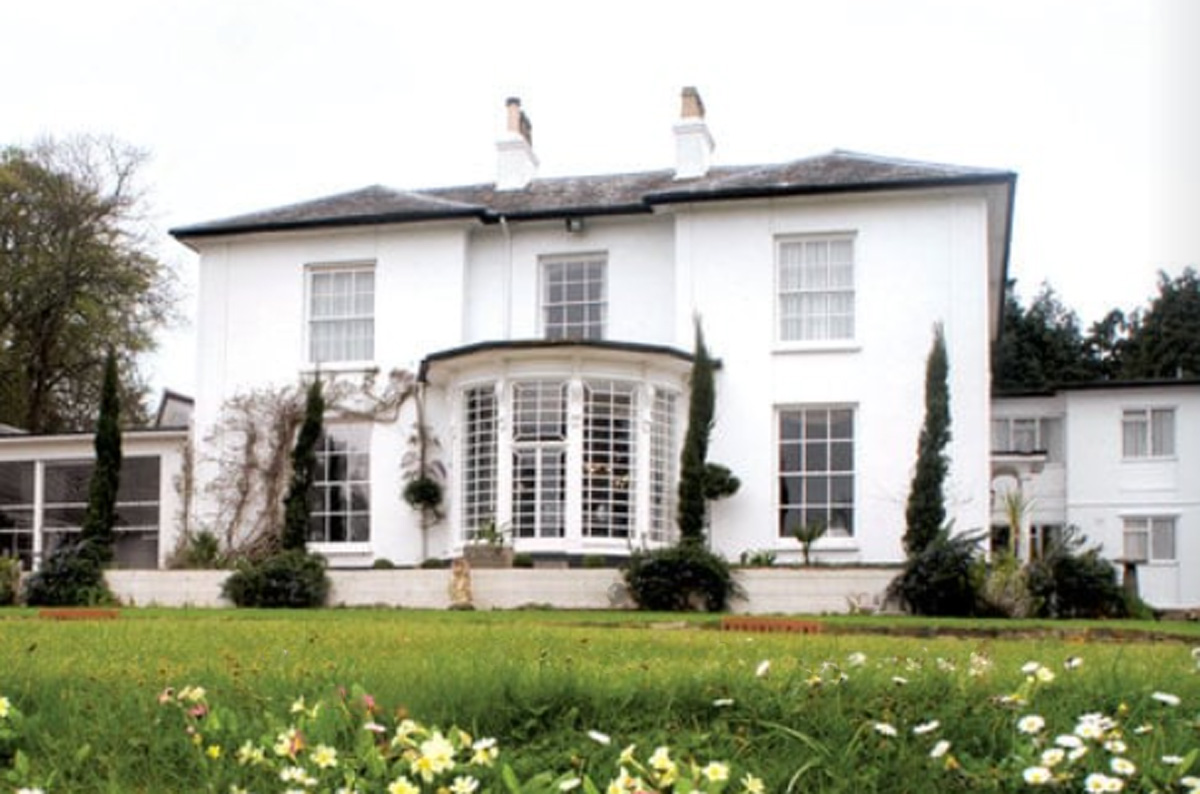
Penmere Manor Hotel

Penmere Manor Hotel near Falmouth, Cornwall, is a house of historical significance and is Grade II listed on the English Heritage Register. It was built in about 1825 by a wealthy sea captain and was the home of numerous notable people over the next 150 years. It is now a hotel which provides accommodation and restaurant facilities and has a leisure club.

== The early residents ==
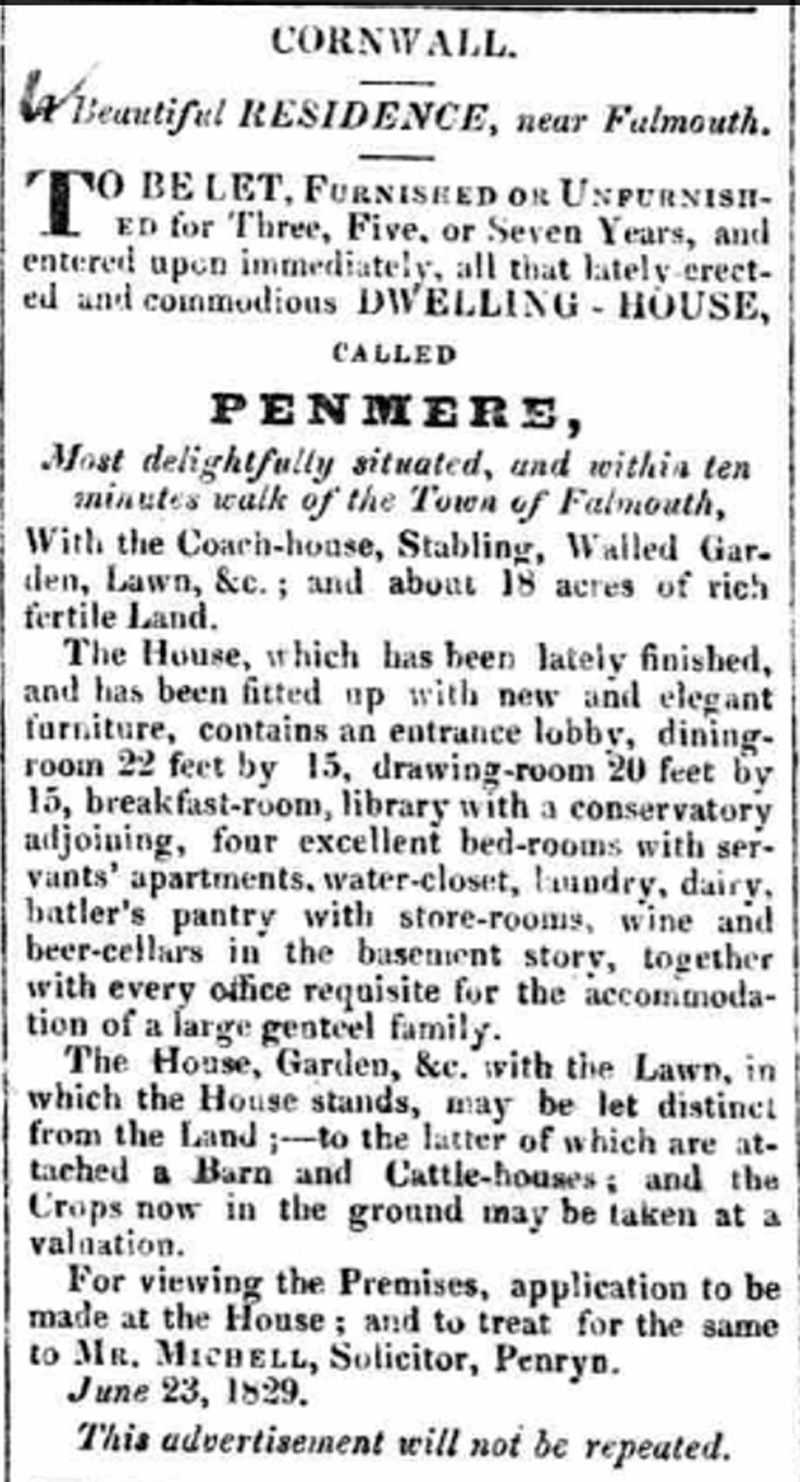
Rental notice for Penmere Manor 1829.

Captain John Bullock (1778-1828) built Penmere Manor in about 1825. He was born in Falmouth in 1778. His father was Peter Bullock (1749-1830) who lived in Falmouth and his mother was Eleanor Johns. He married three times. His first two wives died before 1815 and by them he had two sons John James Adolphus Bullock and Henry Bawden Bullock who became a clergyman. His third wife was Betsy Lovell Bullock (maiden name not known). His Will reveals that he owned a considerable amount of property. He had two houses in Falmouth and was the proprietor of the Navy Tavern now the Navy Hotel.

He was a Captain in His Majesty’s Packet Service which was responsible for transporting the mail between Britain and other countries. For many years he was the commander of a boat called Walsingham. A watercolour was painted of this ship which is in the Falmouth Maritime Museum. In 1825 Captain Bullock was transferred to the ship Redpole but in 1828 it was attacked by pirates and he was killed. An account of this incident is given here

After his death Penmere Manor was advertised for rent. The rental notice is shown which gives a good description of the whole property in 1829.

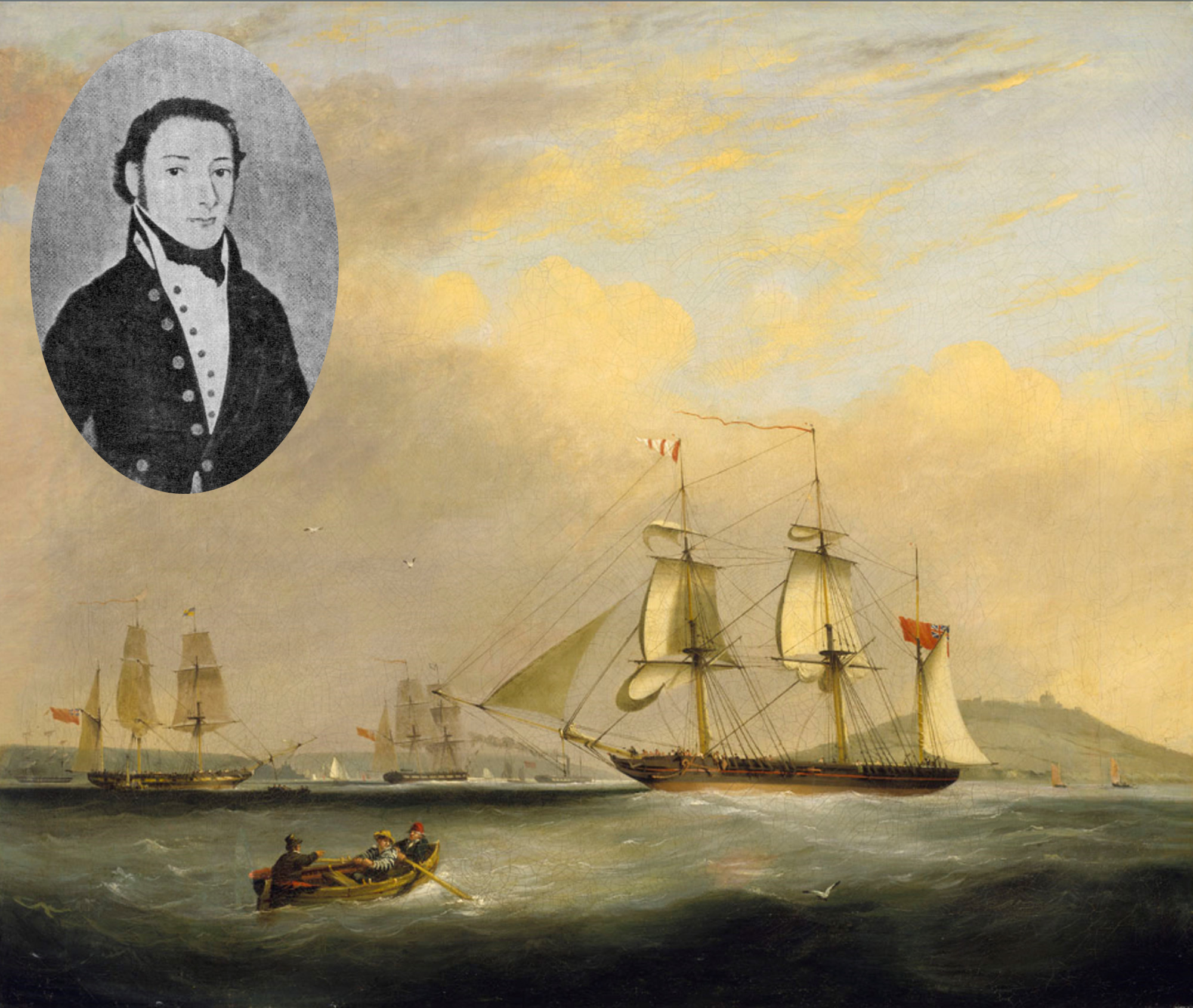
The Packet ship Sheldrake under the command of Captain Passingham entering Falmouth Harbour, 1834

The Passingham family were the next residents of the house and they moved there in the 1830s. Augustus Robert Lloyd Passingham (1795-1844) was born in 1795, in Truro. He was educated at the Royal Naval College in Plymouth and rose rapidly through the ranks of the military. He joined the Packet Service and served on several ships. From 1832 until 1841 he was Captain of the ship Sheldrake. A painting by Matthew Condy of this ship entering Falmouth Harbour in 1834 with Commander Passingham at the helm is in the National Maritime Museum and is shown here.

In 1822 he married his cousin Augusta Passingham (1800-1867) who was the daughter of Lieutenant Colonel Robert Passingham. The couple had nine children, three boys and six girls. He died in 1844 and was buried at the Church of England in Falmouth.

The next resident was Richard Taylor (1810-1883) who lived there with his wife Caroline and children from 1845 until 1851. He was a mining engineer and is listed in Graces Guide to British Industrial History. He was one of the founders of the Royal Cornwall Polytechnic Society, of which he was honorary secretary for thirty-seven years, and president in 1877 and 1878.

Mrs Molesworth rented the house from about 1852 until 1863 She was Frances Susannah Buller the widow of Reverend William Molesworth (1792-1851) who died in 1851. When she left in 1863 the house was placed on the market for sale. It was bought by the Fox family.

== Residents after 1860 ==
Alfred Lloyd Fox (1829-1885) bought Penmere Manor in 1863 shortly before his marriage and remained here with his family until his death in 1885. Alfred was born in 1829. His father was Alfred Fox who was a member of the influential Fox family of Falmouth. He joined the family firm of G. C. and R. W. Fox & Co., merchants and shipping agents at Falmouth after he left school. In 1864 he married Mary Jane Fox who was a distant relative and the couple had three sons. His cousin was the diarist Caroline Fox who mentions that she visited Penmere and met the famous astronomer Sir George Biddell Airy while she was there. Alfred died in 1885 and his wife Mary Jane continued to own Penmere until 1901. when it was bought by the Bolitho family.

Horton Bolitho (full name John Williams Horton Bolitho) lived at Penmere Manor with his family for about forty years. He was born in 1873 in Madron, Cornwall. He was a member of the well-known Cornish Bolitho family and worked as a Manager in their tin mining business. In 1901 he married Charlotte Harriet Hope Hodge and the couple had three children.

During the Second World War the Bolitho family, vacated the house and it became a home for injured officers. It then became a teaching convent for girls. In the late 1950s it was converted to a hotel and retains this function today.
