= Samuel Gosnell Green =

English Baptist minister (1822–1905)

Samuel Gosnell Green (20 December 1822 – 15 September 1905) was an English Baptist minister, educator, author, and bibliophile.

Born in Falmouth, Cornwall, Green was the eldest son among the nine children of a Baptist minister and was sent to a private school in Camberwell. After leaving school, he worked in the printing office of John Haddon in Finsbury and then as a tutor until the age of nineteen. He matriculated in 1840 at the Baptist College, Stepney to prepare for the Baptist ministry and graduated in 1843 with a B.A. from the University of London.

He served two churches, High Wycombe (1845–1847) and Taunton (1847–1851), before taking a position at the Yorkshire Baptist College (Rawdon) as tutor in classics (1851–1863). In 1863, Green became principal at the college, serving until 1876.

In 1876 Green came to London to serve as editor, and in 1881 as editorial secretary, of the Religious Tract Society. Thenceforth his main energies were devoted to literary work, in which towards the end of his long life he was aided by his elder son, Prof. S. W. Green. His most important work was his Handbook to the Grammar of the Greek Testament, published in 1870 (revised editions in 1880, 1885, 1892, and 1904), which was followed in 1894 by a primer which had also a wide circulation. A companion volume on the Hebrew of the Old Testament appeared in 1901.

Green was the editorial secretary of the Religious Tract Society until 1891. In 1900 the University of St Andrews bestowed upon him the honorary degree of D.D. He was the author of eighteen books.

He married in 1848. His wife died in May 1905 shortly before he died in September 1905 in Streatham. There were three sons and a daughter from the marriage.

== Selected publications ==
- Biblical and Theological Dictionary. 1840.
- Religious hindrances to religious revival. 1845.
- The working-classes of Great Britain, their present condition, &c. 1850.
- Clerical subscription and national morality (Bicentenary Lectures). 1862.
- Handbook to the grammar of the Greek Testament. 1870. Revised and improved edition, 1886
- Bible sketches and their teachings, for young people. 1871.
- with illustrations by English and foreign artists: French pictures drawn with pen and pencil. 1878.
- with illustrations by Samuel Manning: English pictures drawn with pen and pencil. 1879.
- What do I believe?. 1880. (Welsh translation, 1882)
- reviser of Harmony of the four Gospels in the words of the Authorised Version. 1890.
- The Psalms of David and modern criticism. 1893.
- A brief introduction to New Testament Greek with vocabularies and exercises. 1894.
- The Christian creed and the creeds of Christendom; seven lectures delivered in 1898 at Regent's Park College, London. 1898.
- The story of the Religious Tract Society for one hundred years. 1899.
- Handbook to Old Testament Hebrew. 1901.
- with Joseph Angus: The Bible hand-book: an introduction to the study of Sacred Scripture. 1904.
- Handbook of Church History. 1904.
