= James George Philp =

British painter

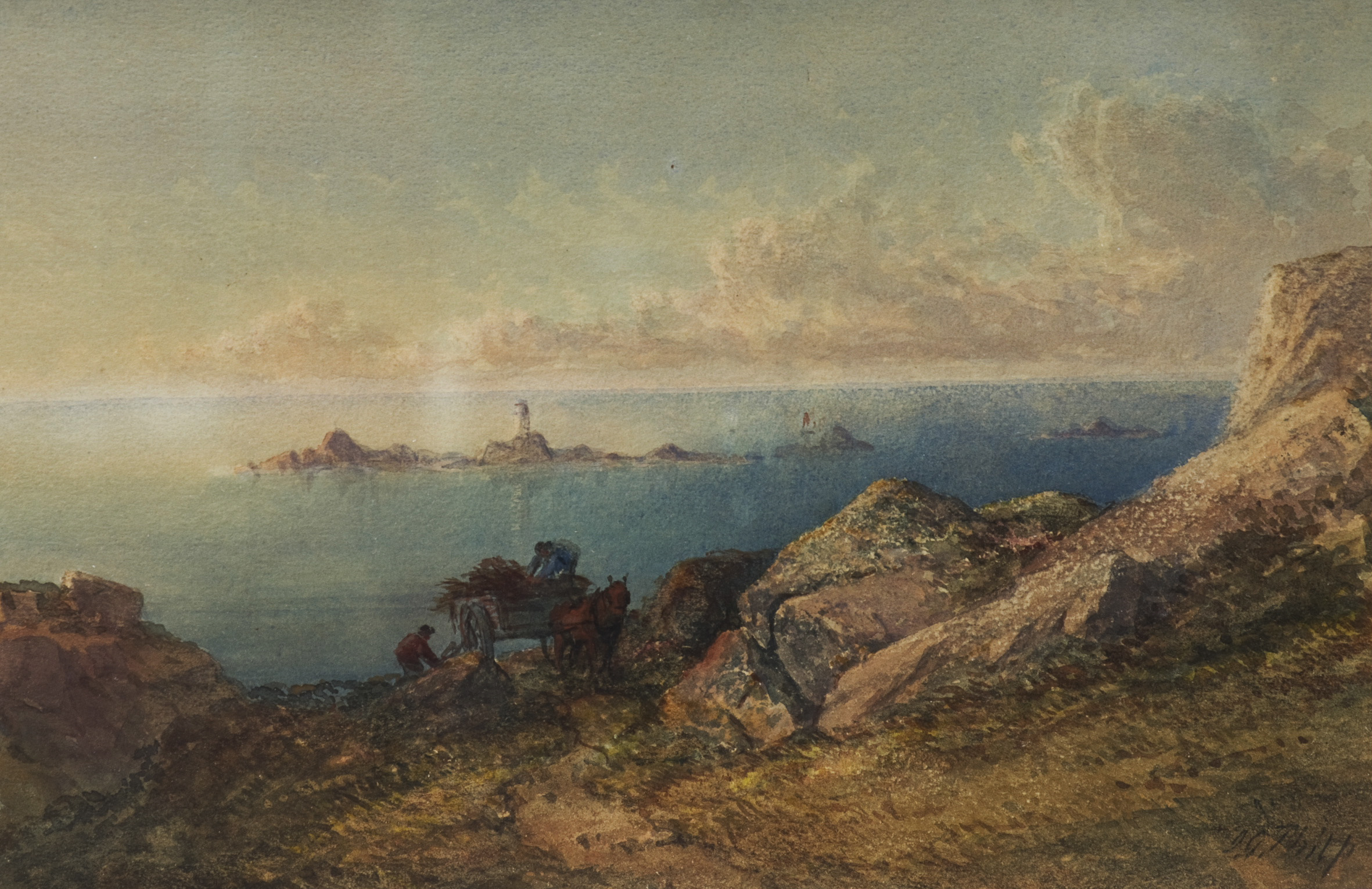
Kelp Gatherers

James George Philp (1816– 11 April 1885), of Falmouth, Cornwall, was a landscape and coastal painter.

Most of his subjects were found in Devon and Cornwall. He exhibited from 1846 to 1885 including the 1880 Winter Exhibition at the Institute of Painters in Water Colours. Philp was described by the critic of The Times as "...the veteran, and most distinguished, coast painter of which Cornwall can boast", and impressed by A Cornish Bulwark describing it as a "striking work" and "a passage of great beauty".

Eighteen months before his death he suffered ″paralysis″, and just before his death in Falmouth he had a seizure. He left a widow and son.
