= Hele & Co =

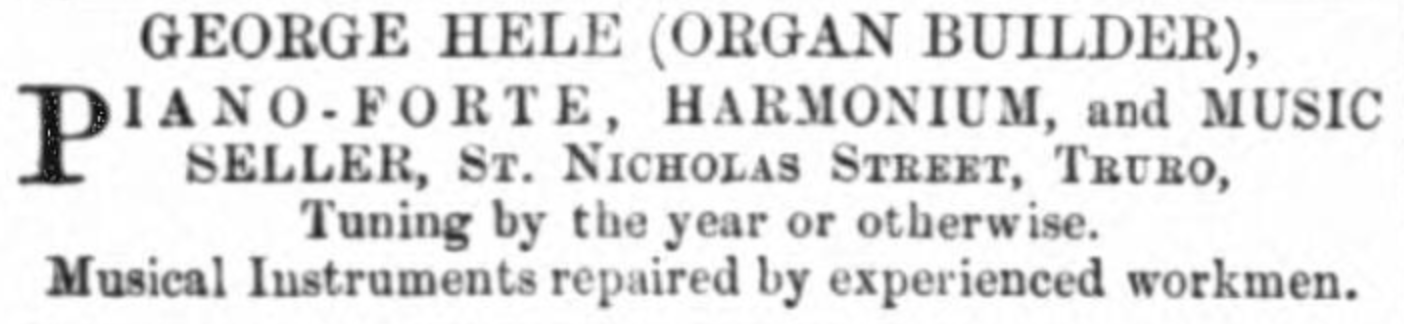
Advertisement from the Royal Cornwall Gazette 15 November 1866

Hele & Co (also known as Hele & Sons) were the main organ builders in the south west of England from 1865 to 2007.

== History ==
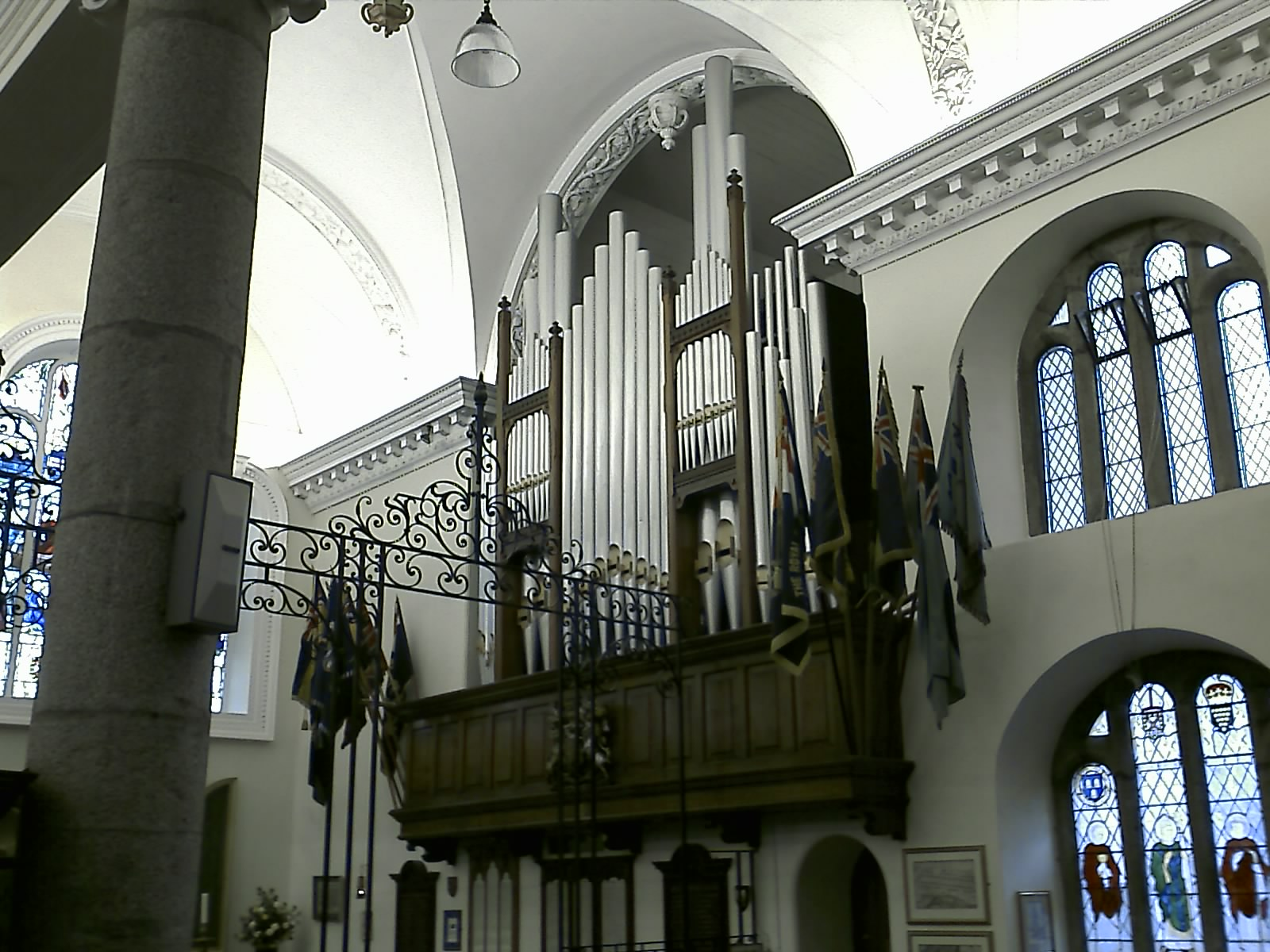
The Hele & Co organ at the Church of King Charles the Martyr, Falmouth dating from 1881

The company was founded by George Hele (1836–1919). Initially George concentrated on selling organs, pianos and harmoniums, but in 1865 he started work in Truro building his first instrument, an organ for Devoran Wesleyan Methodist Chapel.

On 12 June 1859 at Stoke-Damerel he married Mary Ann Calvert (1835–1919).

In 1870 he moved to Plymouth where the company was based until 2007.

During the early years of the twentieth century Hele & Co. expanded, building organs for many churches in the locality.

After the Second World War, J. W. Walker & Sons Ltd took a controlling interest which lasted for several years. After regaining independence, the company continued, but in 2007 it merged with The Midland Organ Company under a new name, Midland Organ Hele and Company Ltd.

== Notable instruments ==
- Devoran Wesleyan Methodist Chapel 1865
- Church of King Charles the Martyr, Falmouth 1881
- St Michael and All Angels Church, Penwerris 1889
- St Michael the Archangel's Church, Chagford 1891
- All Saints' Church, Falmouth 1894
- St Uny's Church, Lelant 1913

Britannia Naval College (on board HMS Hindostan 1892) then moved to Royal Naval College Osborne 1903, then sold in 1921 to Wesleyan Church East Cowes Isle of Wight.
