= William Watson (bow maker) =

William D Watson (1930 – 2018) was an English bow maker. The last pupil of William Retford, William Watson worked for the firm of W.E. Hill & Sons from 1945 to 1962. He continued to make exemplary bows after leaving the firm and built a reputation as an authority on the history of British bow making. His bows for Hill are stamped with the number 7. He lived in Falmouth, Cornwall.
