= Falmouth, Cornwall =

Town in Cornwall, England

Coordinates: 50°09′N 5°04′W

Falmouth: Cornish: Aberfal(a) or Peny-cwm-cuic
- Town and civil parish
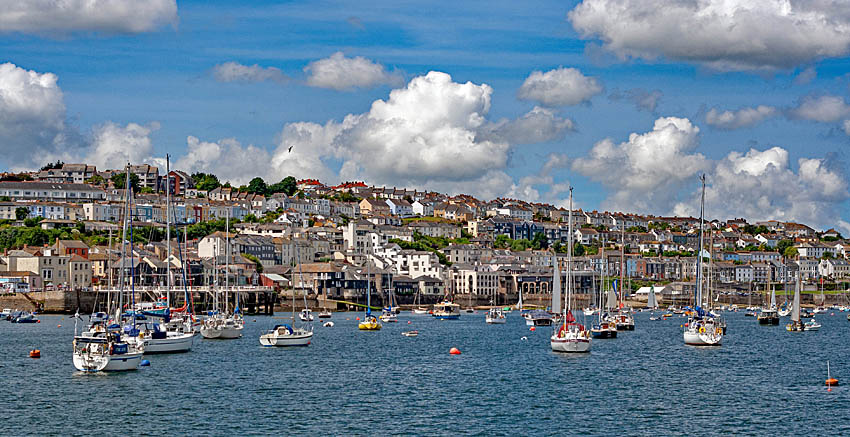
- Falmouth viewed from the estuary

- Location within Cornwall
- Interactive map of Falmouth
- Population: 24,032 (Parish, 2021); 24,070 (Built up area, 2021)
- OS grid reference: SW810325
- Civil parish: Falmouth
- Unitary authority: Cornwall
- Ceremonial county: Cornwall
- Region: South West
- Country: England
- Sovereign state: United Kingdom
- Post town: FALMOUTH
- Postcode district: TR11
- Dialling code: 01326
- Police: Devon and Cornwall
- Fire: Cornwall
- Ambulance: South Western
- UK Parliament: Truro and Falmouth
- Website: www.falmouth.co.uk

Falmouth (/ˈfælməθ/ FAL-məth; Cornish (SWF): Aberfala [abɛrfala]) is a town, civil parish and port on the River Fal on the south coast of Cornwall, England.

Falmouth was founded in 1613 by the Killigrew family on a site near the existing Pendennis Castle. It developed as a port on the Carrick Roads harbour, overshadowing the earlier town of Penryn. In the 19th century after the arrival of the railways, tourism became important to its economy. In modern times, both industries maintain a presence in Falmouth and the town is also home to the National Maritime Museum Cornwall, a campus of Falmouth University and Falmouth Art Gallery. At the 2021 census the parish had a population of 24,032.

== Etymology ==
The name Falmouth is of English origin, a reference to the town's situation on the mouth of the River Fal. The Cornish language name, Aberfala or Aberfal, is of identical meaning.

== History ==
=== Early history ===
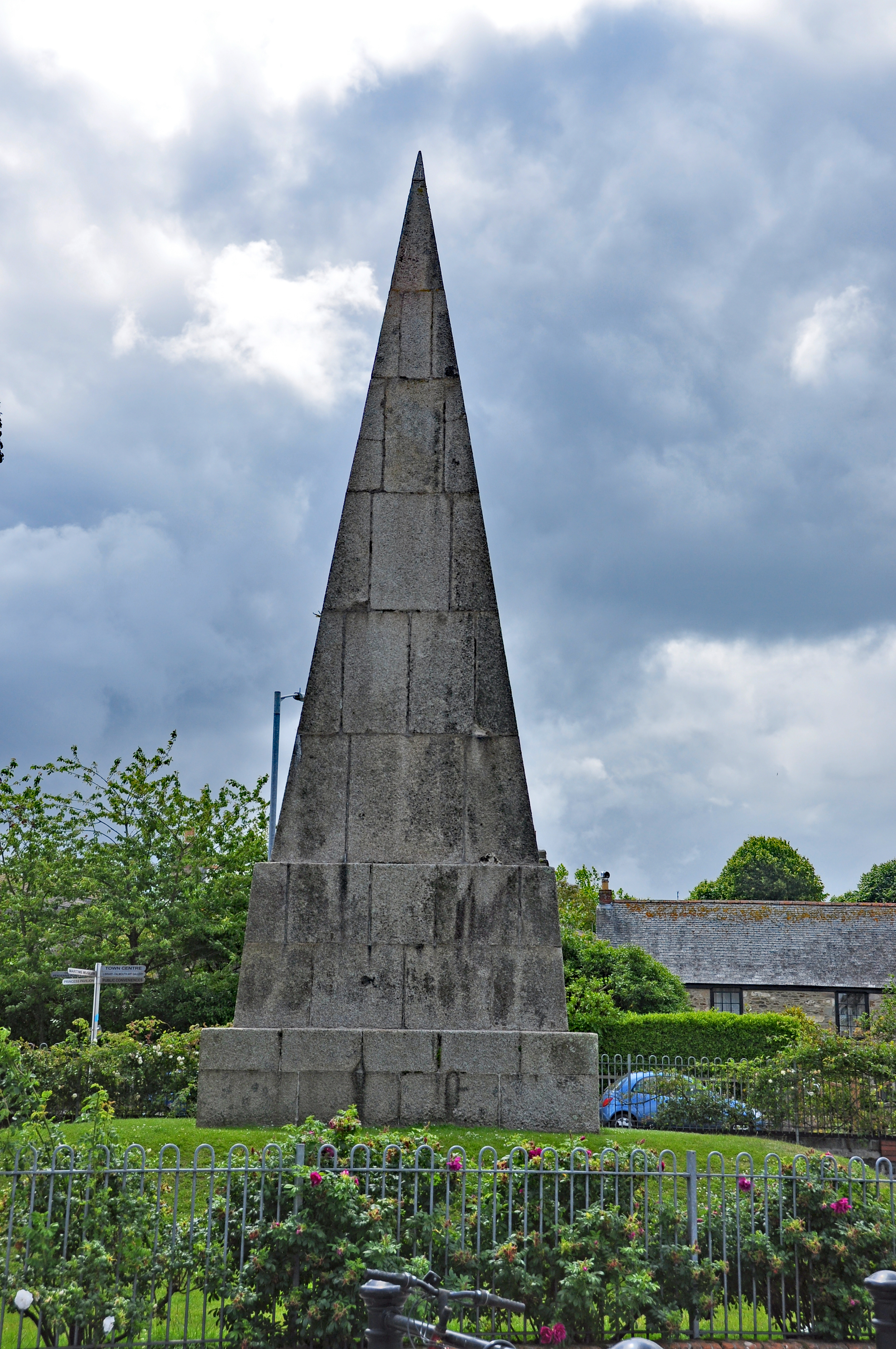
The Killigrew monument

In 1540, Henry VIII built Pendennis Castle in Falmouth to defend Carrick Roads. The main town of the district was then at Penryn. A late-16th century map shows 'Arweneck' manor house with some ordinary dwellings at 'Smithick, alias Pennycomequick' near today's Market Strand. Pennycomequick is an Anglicisation of the Celtic Pen-y-cwm-cuic 'head of the creek'; there is still a Pennycomequick district in Plymouth.

In the late 16th century, under threat from the Spanish Armada, the defences at Pendennis were strengthened by the building of angled ramparts. During the Civil War, Pendennis Castle was the second to last fort to surrender to the Parliamentary Army.

Sir John Killigrew created the town of Falmouth shortly after 1613.

After the Civil War, Sir Peter Killigrew received royal patronage when he gave land for the building of the Church of King Charles the Martyr, dedicated to Charles I, "the Martyr".

The seal of Falmouth was blazoned as "An eagle displayed with two heads and on each wing with a tower" (based on the arms of Killigrew). The arms of the borough of Falmouth were "Arg[ent]. a double-headed eagle displayed Sa[ble]. each wing charged with a tower Or. in base issuant from the water barry wavy a rock also Sa. thereon surmounting the tail of the eagle a staff also proper flying therefrom a pennant Gu[les]".

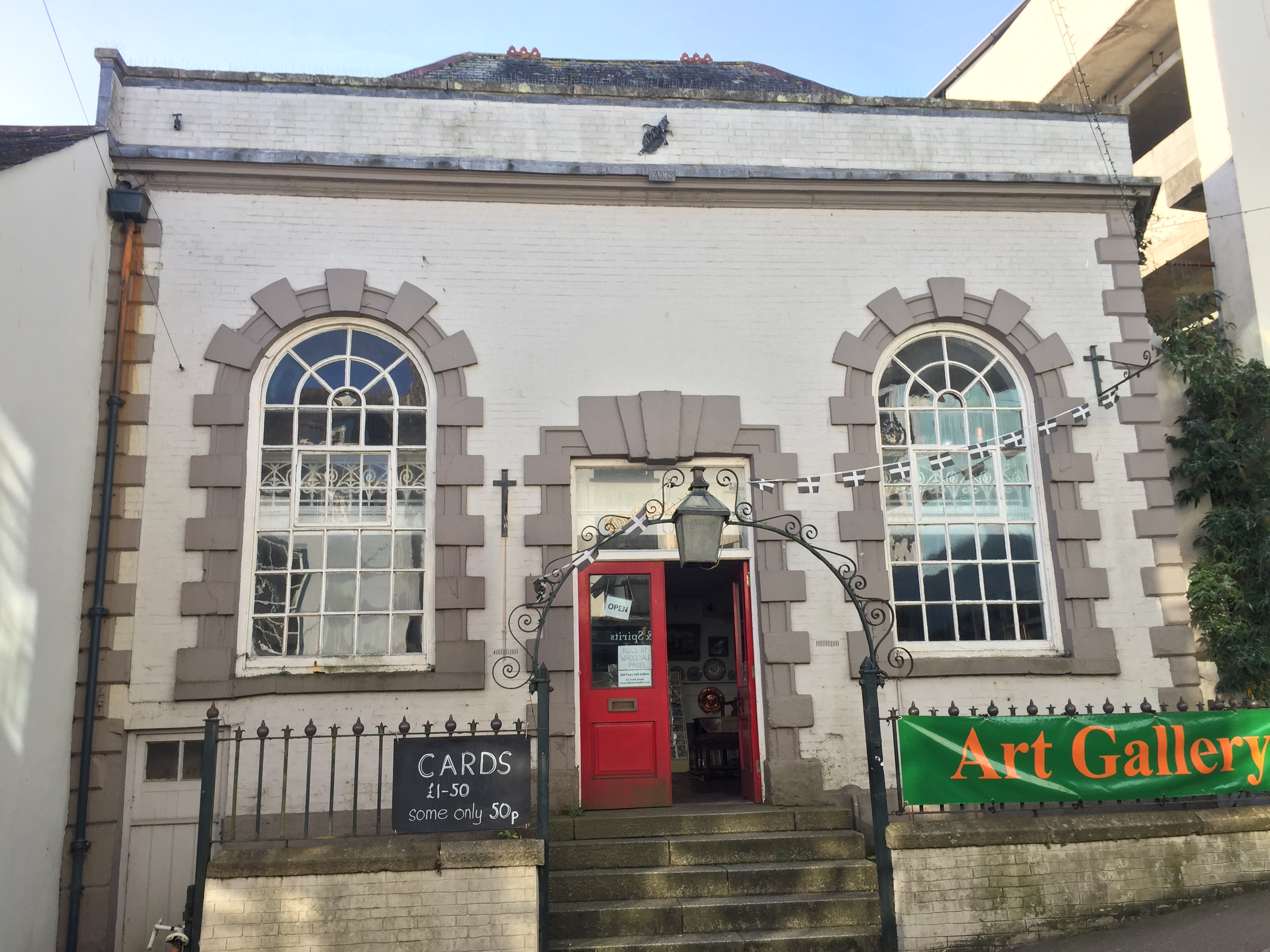
The Old Town Hall

=== 17th and 18th centuries ===
The Falmouth Packet Service operated out of Falmouth for over 160 years between 1689 and 1851. Its purpose was to carry mail to and from Britain's growing empire. At the end of the 18th century, there were thirty to forty, small, full rigged, three-masted ships. The crews were hand picked and both officers and men often made large fortunes from the private contraband trade they took part in, while under the protection of being a Government ship, free from customs and excise searches and therefore payment of duty. Captain John Bullock worked in the Packet Service and built Penmere Manor in 1825.

Being the nearest large harbour to the entrance of the English Channel, two Royal Navy squadrons were permanently stationed here. In the 1790s, one was under the command of Sir Edward Pellew (later Viscount Exmouth) and the other under the command of Sir John Borlase Warren. Each squadron consisted of five frigates, with either 32 or 44 guns. Pellew's flagship was HMS Indefatigable and Warren's was HMS Révolutionnaire. At the time of the French Revolutionary Wars, battle ships and small vessels were continually arriving with war prizes taken from the French ships and prisoners of war. Near Penryn, at Tregellick and Roscrow, were two large camps for the French prisoners.

The Old Town Hall in the High Street was completed in 1710. The corporation moved to a new town hall on The Moor, now the Palacio Lounge, in 1866.

=== 19th and 20th centuries ===
In 1805 news of Britain's victory and Admiral Nelson's death at Trafalgar reached Falmouth from the schooner Pickle and was taken to London by post chaise. On 2 October 1836 HMS Beagle anchored at Falmouth at the end of her noted survey voyage around the world. That evening, Charles Darwin left the ship and took the Mail coach to his family home at The Mount, Shrewsbury. The ship stayed a few days and Captain Robert FitzRoy visited the Fox family at nearby Penjerrick Gardens. Darwin's shipmate Sulivan later made his home in the nearby waterside village of Flushing, then home to many naval officers.

In 1839 Falmouth was the scene of a gold dust robbery when £47,600 worth of gold dust from Brazil was stolen on arrival at the port.

The town had 4,844 inhabitants in 1841.

The Falmouth Docks were developed from 1858, and the Royal National Lifeboat Institution (RNLI) opened Falmouth Lifeboat Station nearby in 1867. The present building dates from 1993 and also houses HM Coastguard. The RNLI operates two lifeboats from Falmouth: Richard Cox Scott, a 17-metre (56 ft) Severn-class all-weather boat, and B-916 Robina Nixon Chard, an Atlantic 85 inshore lifeboat.

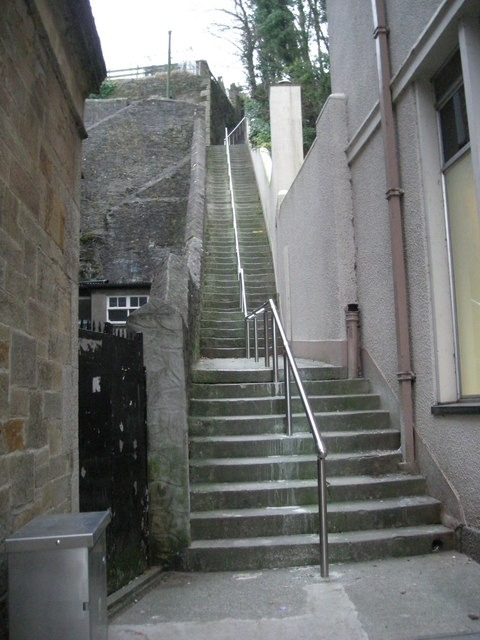
Jacob's Ladder, an 1840s flight of mostly dressed granite steps, rises from Killigrew Street to Vernon Place.

Near the town centre is Kimberley Park, named after the Earl of Kimberley who leased the park's land to the borough of Falmouth. Today the park has exotic and ornate plants and trees.

Falmouth was connected to Plymouth and the rest of the United Kingdom by electric telegraph on 30 August 1857. The telegraph office was adjoining the Custom House and Globe Hotel. In 1869 the telegraph office moved to the new Falmouth Post Office on Church Street.

A telephone trunk line to Falmouth was opened in January 1899. It was noted in Lake's Falmouth Packet and Cornwall Advertiser of 14 January 1899 that "the tariff for conversations carried on over any distance is too high to suggest the use of the telephone for anything except urgent business". The exchange was over the Post Office on The Moor.

The Cornwall Railway reached Falmouth on 24 August 1863. The railway brought new prosperity to Falmouth, as it made it easy for tourists to reach the town. It also allowed the swift transport of the goods recently disembarked from the ships in the port. The town now has three railway stations. Falmouth Docks railway station is the original terminus and is close to Pendennis Castle and Castle beach. Falmouth Town railway station was opened on 7 December 1970 and is convenient for the National Maritime Museum Cornwall, the waterfront, Gyllyngvase beach and town centre.

Penmere railway station opened on 1 July 1925 towards the north of Falmouth and within easy walking distance of the top of The Moor. All three stations are served by regular trains from Truro on the Maritime Line. Penmere Station was renovated in the late 1990s, using the original sign and materials.

The town saw a total eclipse of the Sun at 11:11 a.m. on 11 August 1999. This eclipse lasted just over two minutes at Falmouth, the longest duration in the United Kingdom.

==== Second World War ====
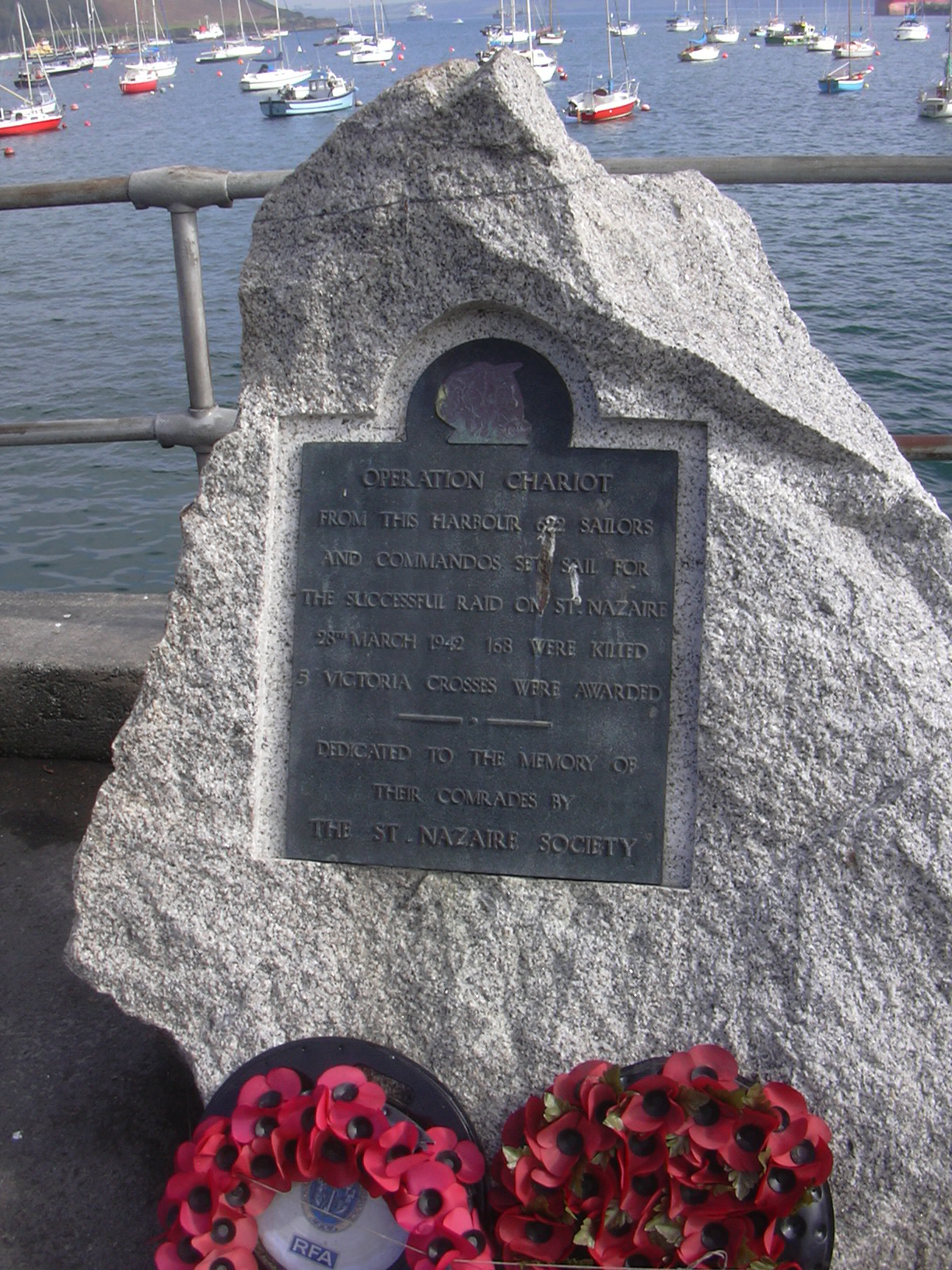
St Nazaire memorial

During World War II, 31 people were killed in Falmouth by German bombing. An anti-submarine net was laid from Pendennis to St Mawes, to prevent enemy U-boats entering the harbour.

It was the launching point for the St Nazaire Raid in 1942. Between 1943 and 1944, Falmouth was a base for American troops preparing for the D-Day invasions. Many of the troops involved embarked from Falmouth harbour and the surrounding rivers and creeks. There are commemorative plaques at Turnaware Point, Falmouth Watersports marina, Tolverne and Trebah gardens. The United States Navy had a large base in Falmouth harbour as well.

==== Post War ====
The SS Flying Enterprise, a cargo vessel that had sailed from Hamburg on 21 December 1951, ran into a storm on the Western Approaches to the English Channel. A crack appeared on her deck and the cargo shifted. A number of vessels went to her aid including the tug Turmoil which was stationed in Falmouth, but they found it initially impossible to take the Flying Enterprise in tow. The ship was finally taken in tow on 5 January 1952 by the Turmoil when she was some 300 nautical miles (560 km) from Falmouth. It took several days to reach port. On 10 January the tow line parted when the ship was still 41 nautical miles (76 km) from Falmouth. Two other tugs joined the battle to save the ship and cargo, but the Flying Enterprise finally sank later that day. Captain Carlsen and the tug's mate Kenneth Dancy, the only crew members still on board, were picked up by Turmoil and taken to Falmouth to a hero's welcome.

=== Historic estates ===
- Arwenack, of which a small portion remains, was the estate which occupied the site before the development of the town of Falmouth; it was long the seat of the Killigrew family.

== Governance ==
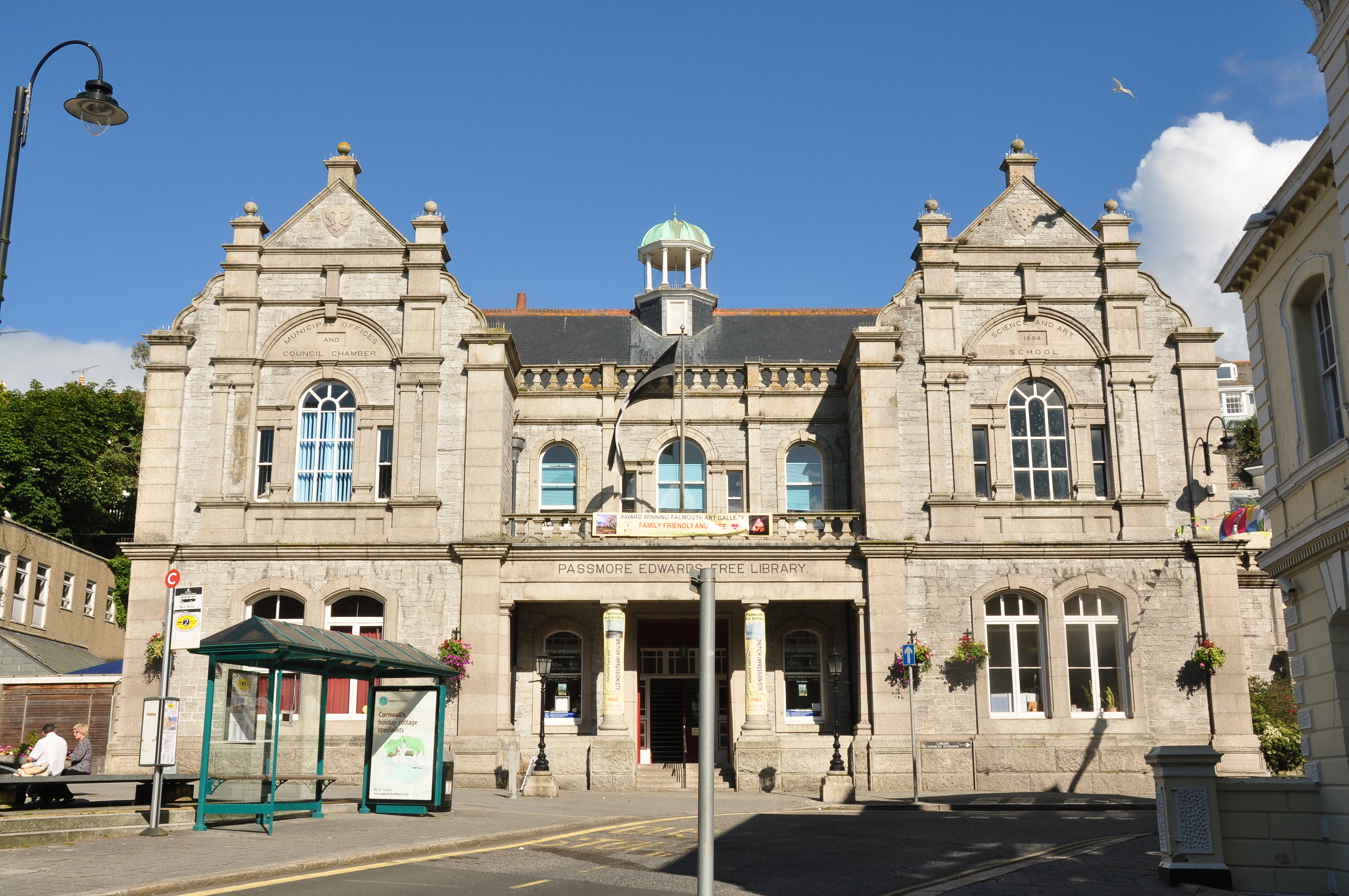
Municipal Building, The Moor: Town council's meeting place

There are two tiers of local government covering Falmouth, at parish (town) and unitary authority level: Falmouth Town Council and Cornwall Council. The town council has its offices at the Old Post Office on The Moor, and meets at the adjoining Municipal Building (built 1896), which also houses the town's library and an art gallery.

For elections to Cornwall Council, there are four electoral divisions with Falmouth in their names: Falmouth Arwenack, Falmouth Boslowick, Falmouth Penwerris, Falmouth Smithick, and Falmouth Tescobeads and Budock (the latter also covers the parish of Budock). Each division elects one councillor.

=== Administrative history ===
Falmouth historically formed part of the ancient parish of Budock in the Kerrier Hundred of Cornwall. The town was incorporated as a borough by a charter from Charles II dated 5 October 1661. Three years later, in 1664, a new parish of Falmouth was also created from part of Budock. The borough only covered the core of the nascent town, comprising 31 acres (13 hectares) of land around High Street, Market Street and Church Street, whereas the parish also covered surrounding rural areas ceded from Budock. The borough was reformed to become a municipal borough in 1836 under the Municipal Corporations Act 1835, which standardised how most boroughs operated across the country.

The urban area increasingly grew beyond the borough boundaries, and in 1864 the part of Falmouth parish outside the borough was made a local government district administered by an elected local board. After 1864 there was therefore a borough council responsible for the central part of the town and a separate local board responsible for the suburbs. Parish responsibilities under the poor laws were also administered separately for the borough and the remainder of Falmouth parish outside the borough. As such these two areas became separate civil parishes called Falmouth Borough and Falmouth in 1866, when the legal definition of 'parish' was changed to be the areas used for administering the poor laws.

By 1892, it was estimated that the borough only contained a third of the population of the urban area. The borough was therefore extended in 1892 to take in Falmouth parish (the local board of which was abolished) plus parts of Budock parish, including Pendennis Castle south of the town and the area around Greenbank Quay north of the town. Civil parish boundaries were not automatically changed by the borough's extension in 1892. The parishes within the borough were subsequently united into a single parish of Falmouth matching the borough in 1920. The borough was enlarged again in 1934, taking in further areas west of the town.

The borough of Falmouth was abolished in 1974 under the Local Government Act 1972, when the area became part of the Carrick district. A successor parish called Falmouth was created at the same time, covering the area of the abolished borough. As part of the 1974 reforms, parish councils were given the right to declare their parishes to be a town, allowing them to take the title of town council and giving the title of mayor to the council's chairperson. The new parish council for Falmouth exercised this right, taking the name Falmouth Town Council.

Carrick district was abolished in 2009. Cornwall County Council then took on district-level functions, making it a unitary authority, and was renamed Cornwall Council.

== Economy, industry and tourism ==
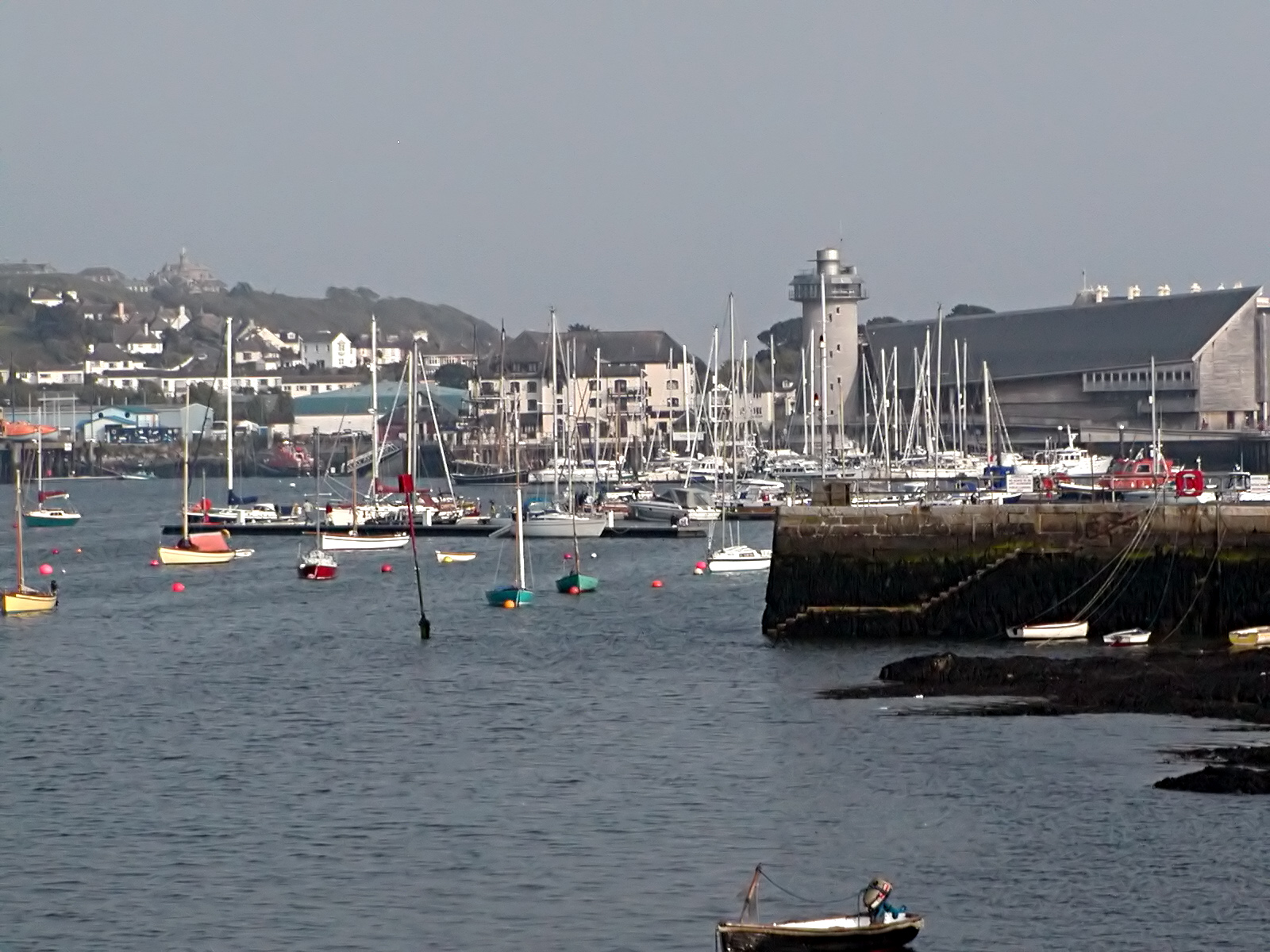
Falmouth Harbour, National Maritime Museum, Cornwall and Pendennis Castle.

While Falmouth's maritime activity has much declined from its heyday, the docks are still a major contributor to the town's economy. It is the largest port in Cornwall. Falmouth remains a cargo port and the bunkering of vessels and the transfer of cargoes also keep the port's facilities busy. The port is popular with cruise ship operators.

Further up the sheltered reaches of the Fal there are often several ships laid up, awaiting sailing orders and/or new owners/charterers.

Falmouth is a popular holiday destination and it is now primarily a tourist resort. The five main beaches starting next to Pendennis Castle and moving along the coast towards the Helford river are Castle, Tunnel, Gyllyngvase, Swanpool and Maenporth beaches. The National Maritime Museum Cornwall opened in February 2003. The building was designed by the architect M. J. Long.

The Falmouth & Penryn Packet, first published in 1858, is still based in the town as the lead title in a series of Packet Newspapers for central and western Cornwall.

The West Briton newspaper, first published in 1810, is a weekly tabloid newspaper which has a Falmouth & Penryn edition reporting on the area.

Rowe's Cornish Bakers, a bakery chain operating in South England & South Wales, was founded in Falmouth on Market Street in 1949 and continues to operate on the same street to this day.

== Culture ==
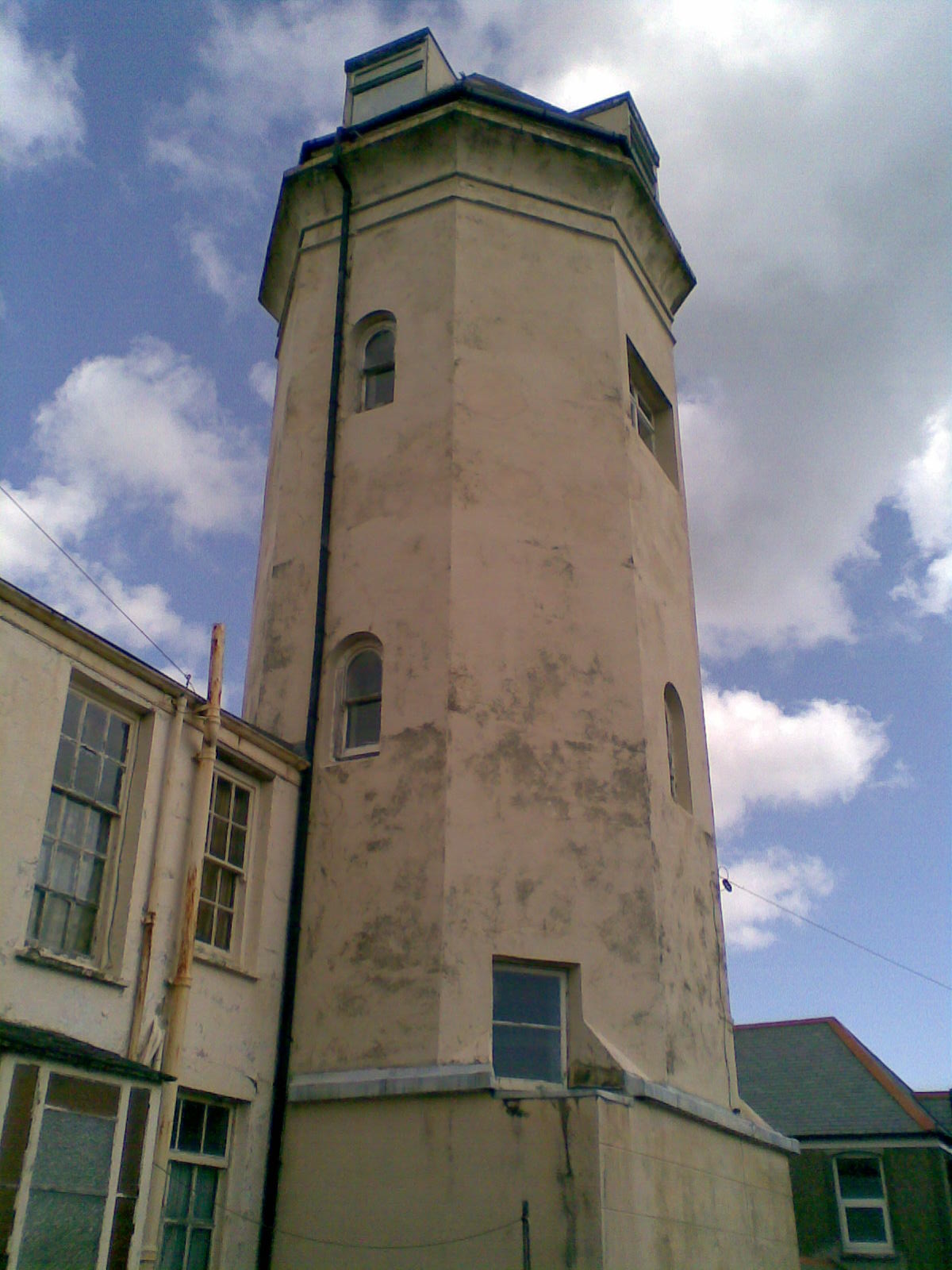
Meteorological Observation Tower, built by the "Poly"

Falmouth has many literary connections. The town was the birthplace of Toad, Mole and Rat: Kenneth Grahame's classic The Wind in the Willows began as a series of letters sent to his son. The first two were written at the Greenbank Hotel whilst Grahame was a guest in May 1907. Reproductions of the letters are currently on display in the hotel. Poldark author Winston Graham knew the town well and set his novel The Forgotten Story (1945) in Falmouth.

The town has been the setting for several films and television programmes. British film star Will Hay was a familiar face in Falmouth in 1935 whilst filming his comedy Windbag the Sailor. The film had many scenes of the docks area. The docks area was featured in some scenes with John Mills for the 1948 film Scott of the Antarctic. Robert Newton, Bobby Driscoll and other cast members of the 1950 Walt Disney film Treasure Island (some scenes were filmed along the River Fal) were visitors to the town. Stars from the BBC TV serial The Onedin Line stayed in the town during filming in the late 1970s. In 2011 Paramount Pictures filmed parts of the film World War Z starring Brad Pitt in Falmouth Docks and off the coast.

Falmouth had the first "Polytechnic": Royal Cornwall Polytechnic Society which went into administration briefly in 2010 but is now a feature of the town with frequent art exhibitions, stage performances and an art house cinema.

Falmouth is home to many theatre groups, including Falmouth Theatre Company, Falmouth Young Generation and Amity Theatre. Falmouth Theatre Company, also known as FTC, is the oldest local company with performances dating back to 1927.

The Falmouth Art Gallery is a public gallery with a diverse 19th and 20th century art collection including many notable modern Cornish artists exhibited in four to five seasonal exhibitions a year, as well as a "family friendly and free" community and schools education programme.

Falmouth has its own community radio station Source FM broadcasting on 96.1 FM and online.

In 2016, Falmouth won the "Great British High Street 2016" award, in the 'Coastal Community' category.

== Religious sites ==
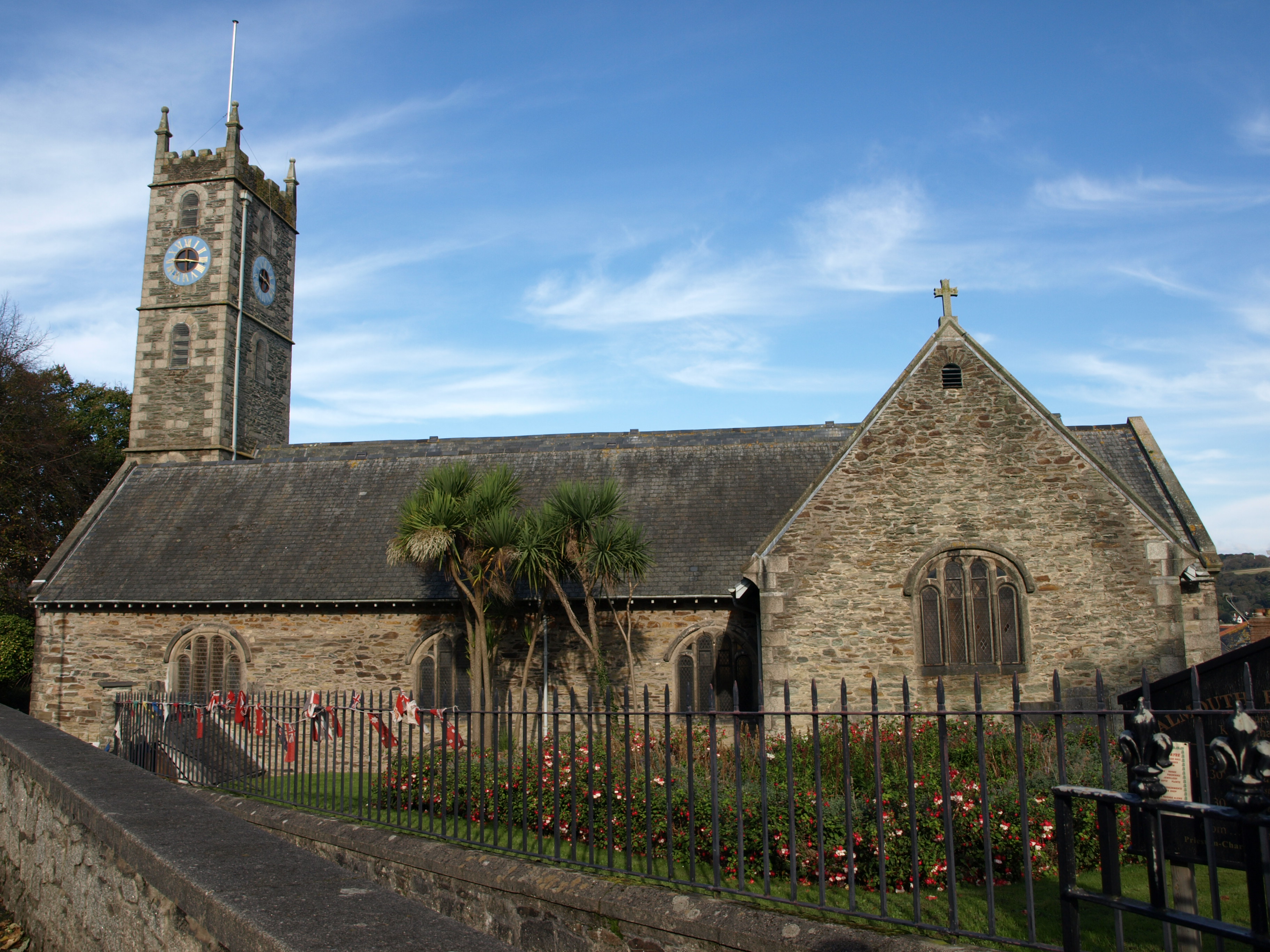
Falmouth Parish Church, Church Street, dedicated to "King Charles the Martyr"

The Anglican parish churches are dedicated to King Charles the Martyr and to All Saints. A third church is St Michael's Church, Penwerris. The Roman Catholic church of St Mary Immaculate is in Killigrew Street. It was designed by J. A. Hansom and built in 1868; the tower and spire (1881) are by J. S. Hansom; the baptistery and porch were added in 1908 to the original designs. The style is a blend of Gothic and Burgundian Romanesque, creating a very French effect. Two of the stained glass windows are early works of Dom Charles Norris. Falmouth Methodist Church is also in Killigrew Street; the street façade is "one of the grandest expressions of Methodism in Cornwall". The United Reformed Church (originally Bible Christian) is in Berkeley Vale. The former synagogue (1816) is one of the earliest surviving synagogue buildings in England; it was in use until 1879.

== Transport ==
=== Falmouth harbour ===
Falmouth Harbour Act 1845
- Act of Parliament
- Parliament of the United Kingdom
- Long title: An Act for deepening, regulating, and otherwise improving Falmouth Harbour in the County of Cornwall, and for forming Basins, Docks, and other Works in Penryn Creek in the aforesaid Harbour; and for other Purposes.
- Citation: 8 & 9 Vict. c. clxxiii

Dates
- Royal assent: 31 July 1845

Text of statute as originally enacted

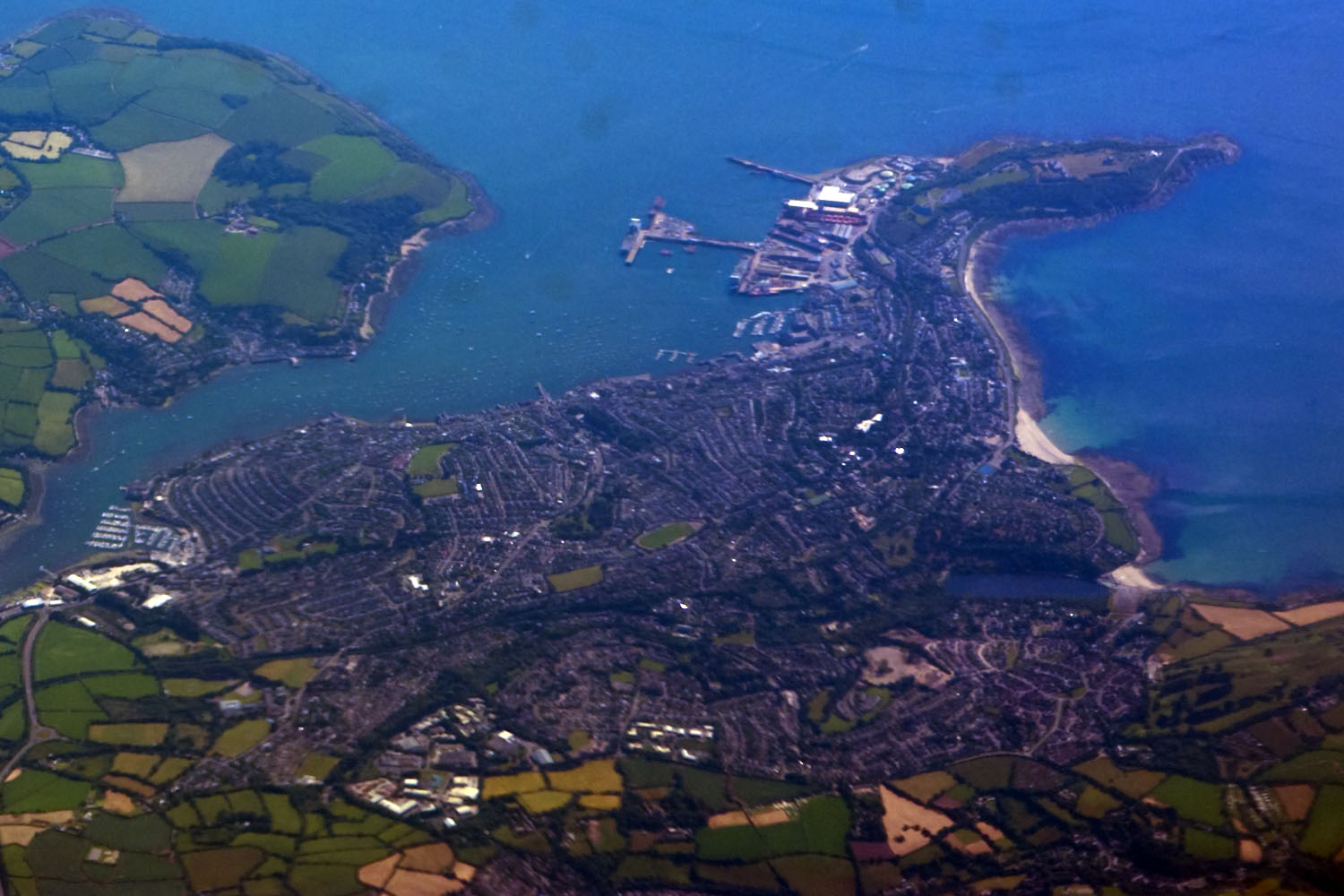
Aerial view of Falmouth: Penryn River centre left; part of Carrick Roads top; part of Falmouth Bay right

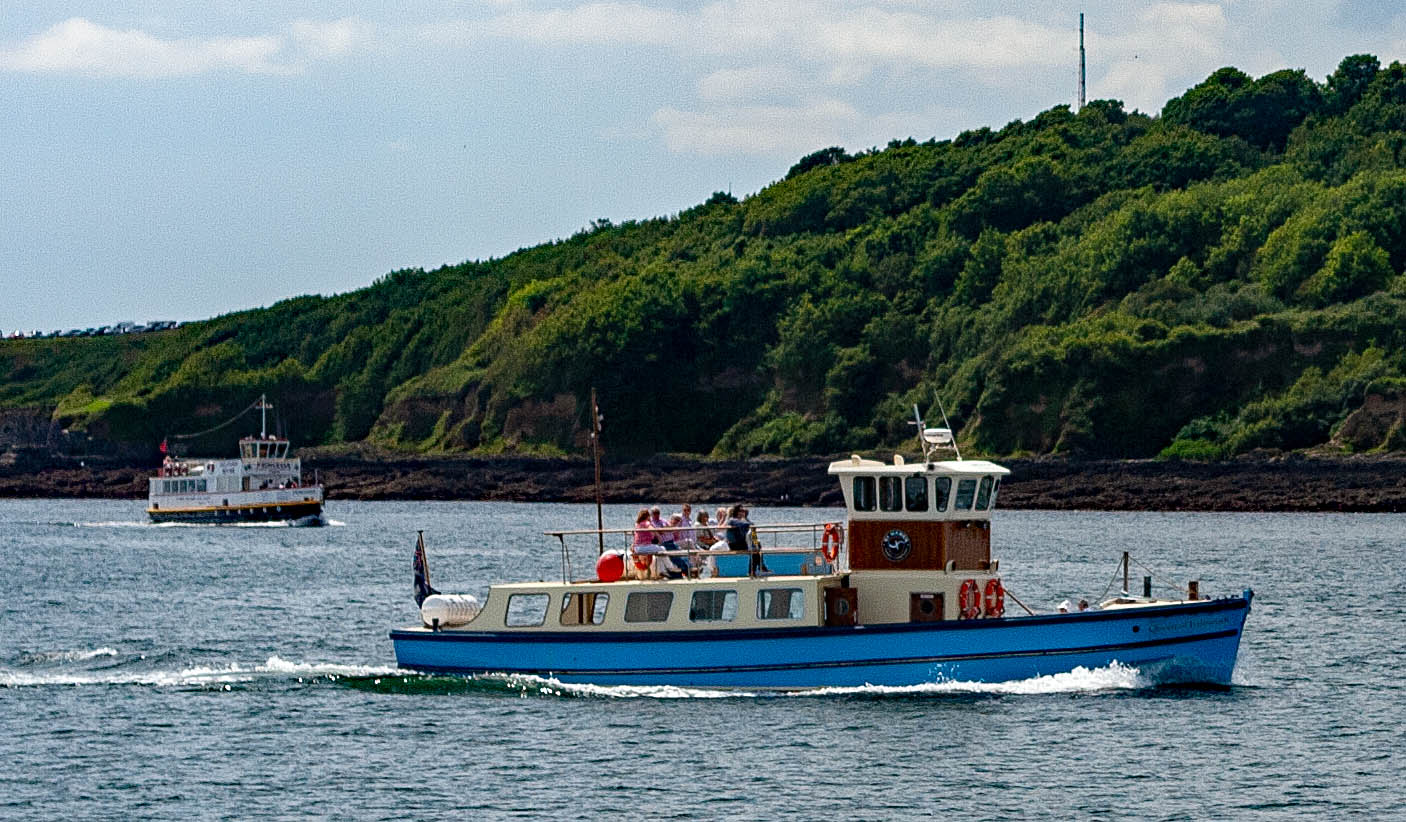
St Mawes ferry returning to Falmouth

Falmouth is famous for its harbour. Together with Carrick Roads, it forms the third deepest natural harbour in the world, and the deepest in Western Europe. It has been the start or finish point of various round-the-world record-breaking voyages, such as those of Robin Knox-Johnston and Dame Ellen MacArthur. Falmouth Harbour Commissioners were first formed by the Falmouth Harbour Act 1845 (8 & 9 Vict. c. clxxiii), and were re-incorporated in their current form by the Falmouth Harbour Order 1870.

=== Road ===
Falmouth is a terminus of the A39 road, connecting to Bath, Somerset some 180 miles (290 km) distant although such a route has now been surpassed by the A303, A37 and A367. The A39 connects Falmouth with the A30 via Truro. The A30 provides a fast link between Falmouth and the M5 motorway at Exeter 98 miles (160 km) to the northeast.

Most commercial bus services are provided by Go Cornwall Bus who have an outstation in Falmouth. Other services are run by Office & Transport Services on behalf of Transport for Cornwall.

=== Railway ===
Falmouth has three railway stations (described above) at the southern end of an 11 3/4 miles (19 km) branch line (the Maritime Line) from Truro. The train takes roughly 28 minutes inbound and 24 minutes outbound with stops at Perranwell, Penryn, Penmere, Falmouth Town and Falmouth Docks.

=== Ferries ===
Falmouth has regular ferry routes connecting to St Mawes, Flushing and Trelissick, Malpas and Truro.

== Education ==
There are five primary schools in the town and one secondary school, namely Falmouth School.

Falmouth University has a campus at the original town site, Woodlane, and another in the Combined Universities in Cornwall campus at Tremough, Penryn, which it shares with the University of Exeter. It offers undergraduate and postgraduate courses chiefly in the fields of Art, Design and Media. The University of Exeter, Cornwall Campus offers a range of undergraduate and postgraduate courses, often with a particular focus on the environment and sustainability, and also hosts the world-renowned Camborne School of Mines (formerly located nearby in Camborne), which specialises in the understanding and management of the Earth's natural processes, resources and the environment.

In 2015, actor and comedian Dawn French was installed as Falmouth University's chancellor.

Falmouth Marine School, formerly Falmouth Technical College, specialises in traditional and modern boat-building, marine engineering, marine environmental science and marine leisure sport. The campus is part of Cornwall College.

== Sport and recreation ==
The town has a football team in the Southern Football League Division One South, Falmouth Town A.F.C., who play at Bickland Park in the north-west of the town, and also Falmouth RFC, a rugby union club who play at The Recreation Ground, a site at the top of The Moor.

Falmouth is also home to one of Cornwall's biggest cricket clubs, where four teams represent the town in the Cornwall Cricket League, with the 1st team playing in the Cornwall Premier League. Falmouth CC play at the Trescobeas ground on Trescobeas Road.

With its proximity to sheltered and unsheltered waters, Falmouth has long been a popular boating and water sports location. It is, for example, a centre of Cornish pilot gig rowing, the home of Gyllyngvase Surf Life Saving Club (founded 2008) and a popular location for sea swimming. Solo yachtsman Robert Manry crossed the Atlantic from Falmouth, Massachusetts (which is named after Falmouth) to Falmouth, Cornwall, from June–August 1965 in the thirteen-and-a-half-foot Tinkerbelle—this was the smallest boat to make the crossing at the time. The town was the location for the 1966, 1982 and 1998 and 2014 Tall Ships' Race in which approximately ninety Tall Ships set sail for Lisbon, Portugal. The town is also hosted the start of the 2021 race.

=== Cornish wrestling ===
Falmouth has been a major centre for Cornish wrestling for centuries. Tournaments were often badged as "the championship of the West of England". Bouts were held at various venues around the town, including Pendennis Castle. Alfred Ernest Trenoweth (1868–1942) from Falmouth was well known as light weight champion wrestler of Cornwall. Another champion wrestler from Falmouth was Pellew, who was especially notable, since he only had one arm!

== Climate ==
Climate data for Falmouth (1916–1995 averages)
Month	Jan	Feb	Mar	Apr	May	Jun	Jul	Aug	Sep	Oct	Nov	Dec	Year
Mean daily maximum °C (°F)	9 (48)	9 (48)	10 (50)	12 (54)	14 (57)	17 (63)	19 (66)	19 (66)	17 (63)	14 (57)	12 (54)	10 (50)	14 (56)
Mean daily minimum °C (°F)	6 (43)	5 (41)	6 (43)	7 (45)	10 (50)	12 (54)	14 (57)	14 (57)	13 (55)	11 (52)	8 (46)	7 (45)	9 (49)
Average precipitation mm (inches)	109.3 (4.30)	83.1 (3.27)	78.3 (3.08)	67.7 (2.67)	62.6 (2.46)	57.5 (2.26)	61.5 (2.42)	64.2 (2.53)	73.3 (2.89)	107.4 (4.23)	113.7 (4.48)	118.2 (4.65)	996.8 (39.24)
Mean monthly sunshine hours	56.7	73.8	121.4	178.3	213.8	215.0	205.0	195.7	147.1	106.0	69.4	53.7	1,635.9

== Notable people ==
=== Sailors and other Military ===
- Rear-Admiral Bartholomew James (1752–1828), an English naval officer and writer.
- Josiah Fox (1763 in Falmouth–1847), British naval architect, involved in the design and construction of the original six frigates of the United States Navy
- James Silk Buckingham (1786–1855), a British mariner, parliamentarian, author, journalist and traveller.
- Henry George Raverty (1825 in Falmouth–1906) was a British Indian Army officer and linguist, he studied Afghan poetry.
- William Odgers (1834 in Falmouth–1873), Royal Navy sailor, recipient of the Victoria Cross in the First Taranaki War
- Edwin Welch (1838 in Falmouth–1916), English naval cadet, surveyor, photographer, newspaper proprietor and journalist
- Admiral Sir Tom Phillips, (1888–1941), Royal Navy officer who served during WW1 & WW2, Commanded Force Z when he went down with his flagship, the battleship HMS Prince of Wales.
- Sir John Carew Pole, 12th Baronet (1902–1993) landowner, soldier, politician and Lord Lieutenant of Cornwall 1962/1977
- Colonel James Power Carne (1906 in Falmouth–1986) Army officer, Korean War recipient of the Victoria Cross
- Lieutenant Commander Robert Peverell Hichens (1909–1943) most highly decorated officer of the Royal Navy Volunteer Reserve (RNVR) lived in Bodrennick House at Flushing, Cornwall

=== Public service including Politicians and Landowners ===
- Sir Robert Killigrew (1580–1633), courtier, Member of Parliament 1601 to 1629, ambassador to the United Provinces, and knight of Arwenack.
- Sir William Trelawny, 6th Baronet (c.1722–1772), British politician and colonial administrator, MP for West Looe from 1757 to 1767, then Governor of Jamaica
- John Laurance (1750 in Falmouth–1810), American lawyer and politician from New York.
- Philip Melvill (1762–1811), philanthropist, founded Falmouth Misericordia Society 1807
- Mary Lloyd (1795 in Falmouth–1865), joint secretary of the Birmingham Ladies Society for the Relief of Negro Slaves in 1825
- Reverend Henry Melvill (1798 in Pendennis Castle–1871), priest in the Church of England, principal of the East India Company College from 1844 to 1858 and Canon of St Paul's Cathedral
- Samuel Prideaux Tregelles (1813 in Falmouth–1875), English biblical scholar, textual critic, and theologian.
- Anna Maria Fox (1816 in Falmouth–1897) promoted Royal Cornwall Polytechnic Society, from Fox family of Falmouth
- John Charles Williams (1861–1939) English Liberal Unionist politician, gardener at Caerhays Castle, where he grew and bred rhododendrons, MP for Truro 1892/95, High Sheriff of Cornwall 1888 and Lord Lieutenant of Cornwall 1918/36
- Sir Edward Hoblyn Warren Bolitho (1882–1969) Cornish landowner and politician. He was Chairman of Cornwall County Council 1941/52 and Lord Lieutenant of Cornwall 1936/62
- Harold Hayman (1894–1966) British Labour Party politician, MP for Falmouth 1950 to 1966
- George Boscawen, 9th Viscount Falmouth (born 1919) peer and landowner, Lord Lieutenant of Cornwall, 1977 to 1994
- David Mudd, (born 1933), British politician, Conservative MP for Falmouth and Camborne from 1970 to 1992
- Lady Mary Holborow, (born 1936), magistrate, daughter of Earl of Courtown, Lord Lieutenant of Cornwall 1994-2004

=== Writers ===
- Eleazer Oswald (1750 in Falmouth–1795), journalist and soldier in British America and the American War of Independence
- Sibella Elizabeth Miles (1800 in Falmouth–1882), was an English schoolteacher, poet and writer.
- John Sterling (1806–1844), Scottish author, moved to Falmouth in 1841
- Nicholas Pocock (1814 in Falmouth–1897), English academic and cleric, known as an historical writer.
- Robert Kemp Philp (1819 in Falmouth–1882) was an English journalist, author and Chartist.
- Caroline Fox (1819 in Falmouth–1871) Cornish diarist, member of the influential Fox family of Falmouth
- John Harris (1820–1884), poet and a fellow of the Royal Historical Society, died locally.
- Samuel Gosnell Green (1822–1905), Baptist minister, educator, author and bibliophile.
- Susan Elizabeth Gay (1845 - 1918 in Crill, Budock), chronicler of Falmouth in a book called Old Falmouth published in 1903
- Joseph Conrad (1857–1924), writer, stayed at Falmouth in 1882 and later recalled his sojourn in a short story titled Youth.
- Howard Spring (1889 - 1965) writer, lived in Falmouth from 1947 onwards
- William John Burley (1914 in Falmouth - 2002) British crime writer whose work includes the Wycliffe detective series
- John Anthony Miller aka Peter Pook (1918 in Falmouth–1978) British author of humorous novels
- Caroline Bammel (1940 in Falmouth - 1995) British ecclesiastical historian
- Penelope Shuttle (born 1947) British poet, lived in Falmouth since 1970, founded the Falmouth Poetry Group in 1972.

=== Artists ===
- James George Philp (1816–1885), a landscape and coastal painter.
- Elizabeth Philp (1827 in Falmouth–1885), English singer, music educator and composer
- Charles Napier Hemy (1841–1917 in Falmouth), British painter of marine paintings, moved to Falmouth in 1881
- Henry Scott Tuke (1858–1929), English visual artist, primarily a painter, but also a photographer
- Hugh St Clair Stewart (1910 in Falmouth–2011) British film editor and producer, filmed Bergen-Belsen concentration camp following its liberation in April 1945
- William D Watson (born 1930) bow maker who worked for W.E. Hill & Sons, lived in Falmouth.
- Rex Thomas Vinson (1935 in Falmouth - 2000) art teacher, artist and science fiction author, wrote as Vincent King
- Patrick Woodroffe (1940-2014) fantasy artist, taught art at Falmouth School of Art.
- Jon Mark (born 1943 in Falmouth) singer-songwriter, recorded with Marianne Faithfull, John Mayall and Mark-Almond.
- Paul Martin (born 1959) antiques dealer, professional drummer, presents BBC antiques programmes including Flog It!, attended Falmouth Grammar School.
- Zapoppin' (formed 2007 in Falmouth) are an alternative folk and skiffle band, noted by Clash magazine for their "black humour and obtuse lyrical themes".

=== Science, Engineering and Business ===
- Thomas Corker (c.1669 in Falmouth - 1700) was a prominent English agent for the Royal African Company and worked in the Sherbro Island Sierra Leone.
- Robert Were Fox the Younger (1789 in Falmouth–1877), British geologist, natural philosopher and inventor, worked on the temperature of the earth and a compass to measure magnetic dip at sea.
- Charles Fox (1797 in Falmouth–1878), a Quaker scientist, developed Trebah garden near Mawnan Smith, part of the influential Fox family of Falmouth.
- Edwin Octavius Tregelles (1806 in Falmouth–1886) was an English ironmaster, civil engineer and Quaker minister.
- William Lobb (1809–1864), Cornish plant collector, employed by Veitch Nurseries of Exeter, introduced into England Araucaria araucana (the monkey-puzzle tree) from Chile
- Lovell Squire (1809–1892), Quaker schoolteacher, meteorologist and writer of sacred verse.
- Robert Barclay Fox (1817–1855), businessman, gardener and diarist, from the influential Quaker Fox family of Falmouth
- Howard Fox (1836 in Falmouth–1922), shipping agent and consul, member of the influential Fox family of Falmouth.
- John Andrewartha (1839 in Falmouth–1916), Cornish-born American architect and civil engineer
- John Sydney Hicks (1864 in Falmouth–1931) British physician and surgeon. He lived in Australia from 1891 to 1912, and was a member of the Western Australian Legislative Assembly
- Charles Masson Fox (1866 in Falmouth–1935) businessman, prominent in chess problems and has his place in gay history.
- Robert Barclay Fox (1873–1934) Falmouth businessman and Conservative politician, inherited Penjerrick Garden
- Elizabeth Lepper (1883–1971), physician and pathologist, worked in the Royal Army Medical Corps in WW1

=== Sport ===
- John Jackett, (1878 in Falmouth-1935) English rugby union player for British Lions and competed in the 1908 Summer Olympics, brother of Richard Jackett
- James Trick "Jimmy" Jose (1881-1963) was Cornish rugby union player for Plymouth Albion R.F.C. and Falmouth R.F.C., competed in the 1908 Summer Olympics
- Edward Aylmer (1892 - 1974) First-class cricketer and Royal Navy officer
- Tony Kellow, (1952 in Budock Water - 2011) professional footballer, over 400 appearances mainly for Exeter City FC
- Kevin Miller (born in Falmouth 1969) retired goalkeeper, played for Barnsley F.C. Crystal Palace F.C. Exeter City F.C. and Watford
- Sebastian Newbold Coe, Baron Coe, (born 1956), referred to as Seb Coe, British politician and former track and field athlete. Won four Olympic medals at the 1980 and 1984 Summer Olympics. MP for Falmouth and Camborne from 1992 to 1997. Elected president of the International Association of Athletics Federations in 2015.
- Matthew Etherington (born 1981 in Truro) footballer played for Falmouth Town under 14s and then for Peterborough United F.C. Tottenham Hotspur F.C. West Ham and Stoke
- Jamie Robert Day (born 1986 in Falmouth) English former footballer who mainly played for Peterborough United F.C., and Rushden & Diamonds F.C.

== Landmarks ==
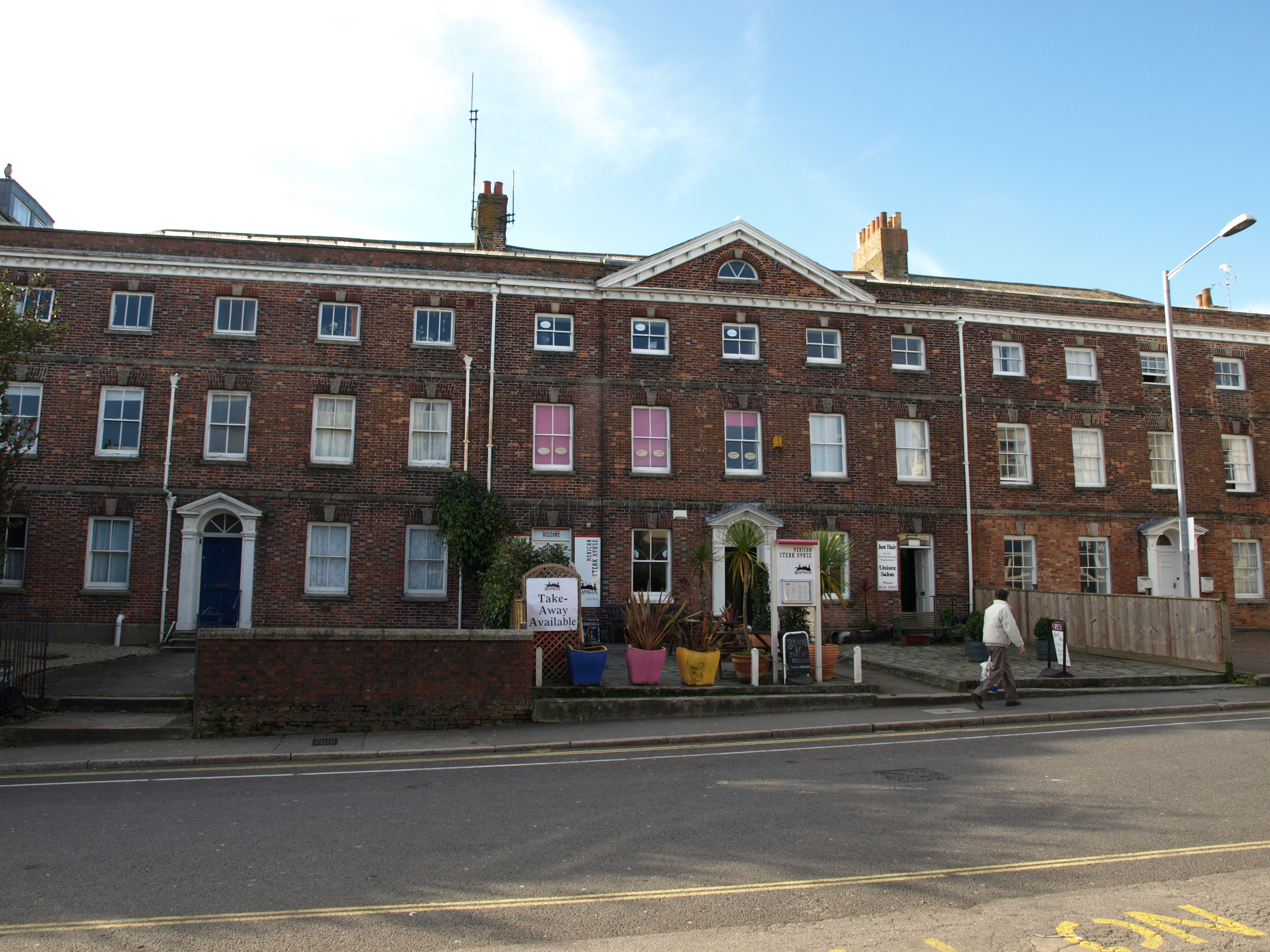
Admiralty House, Arwenack Street

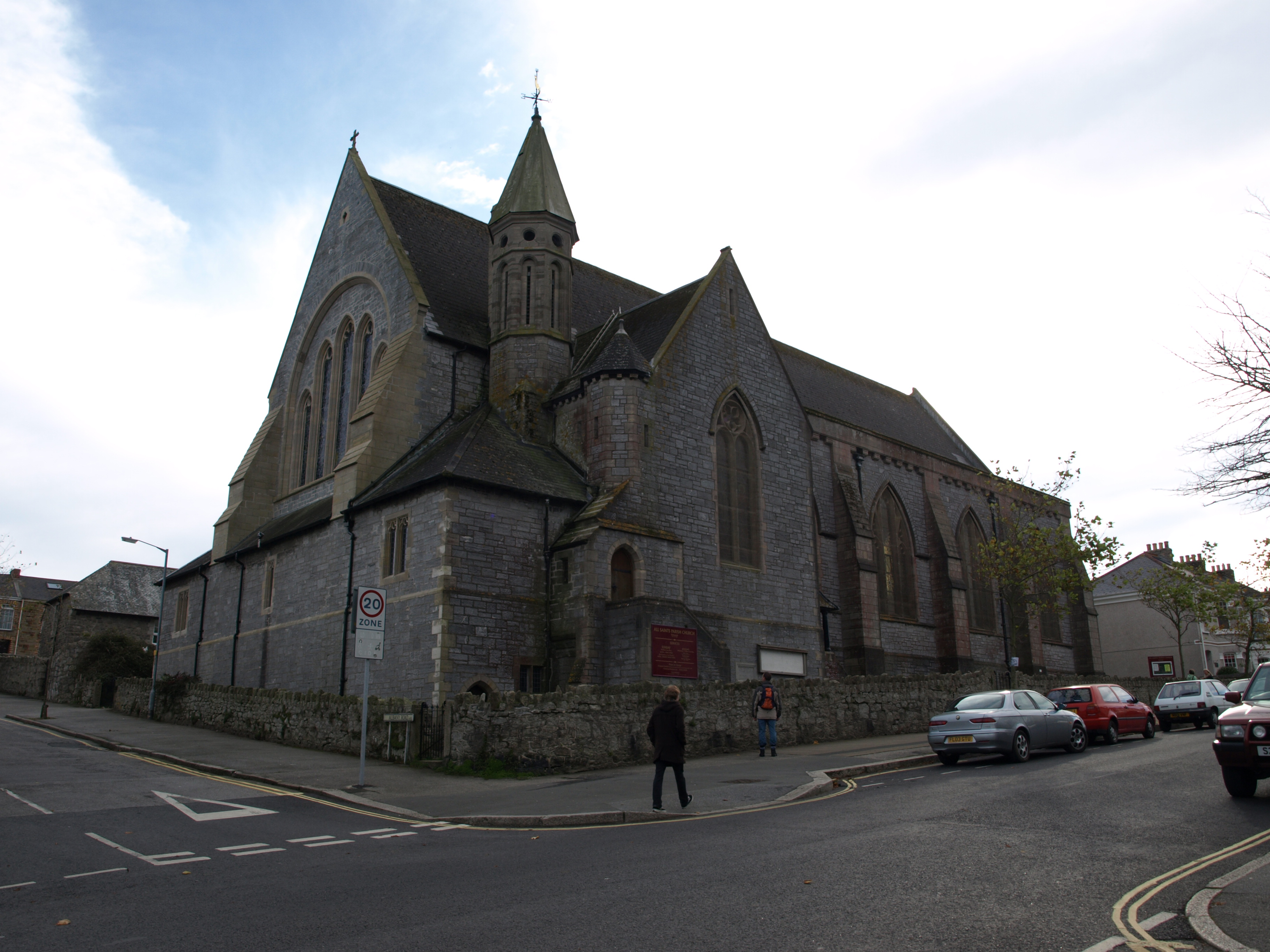
All Saints Church, Killigrew Street

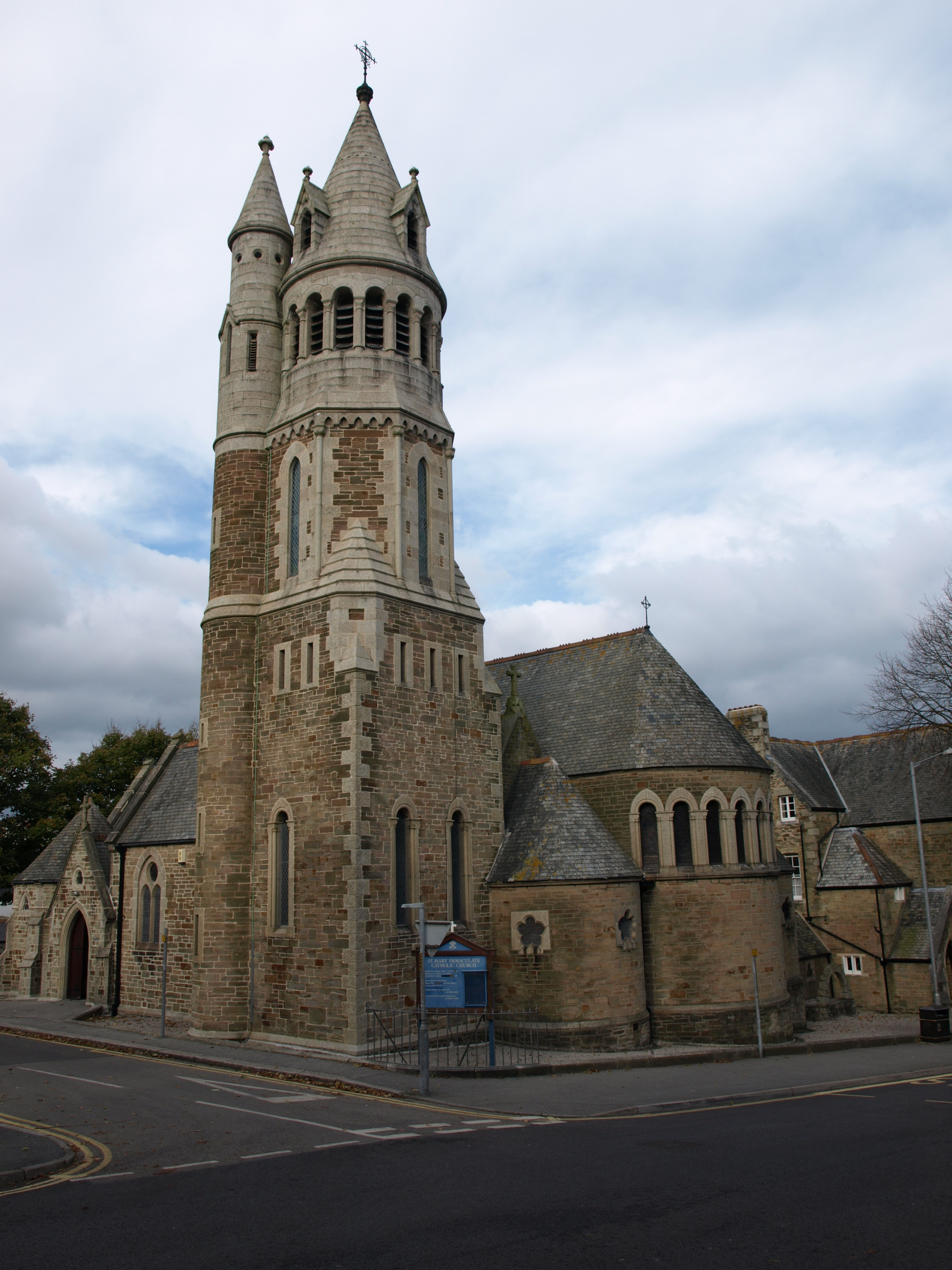
RC Church of St Mary Immaculate

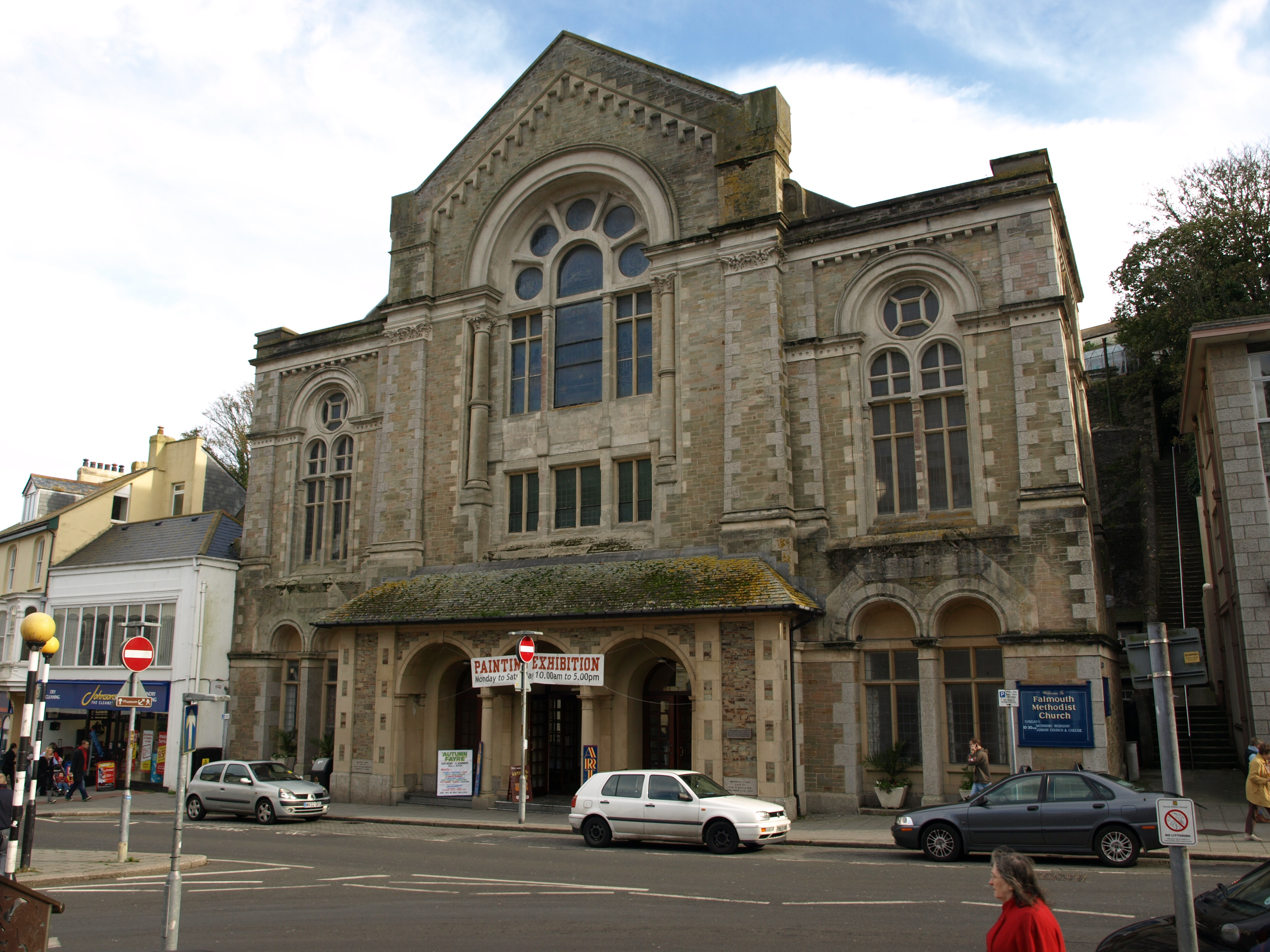
Central Methodist Church

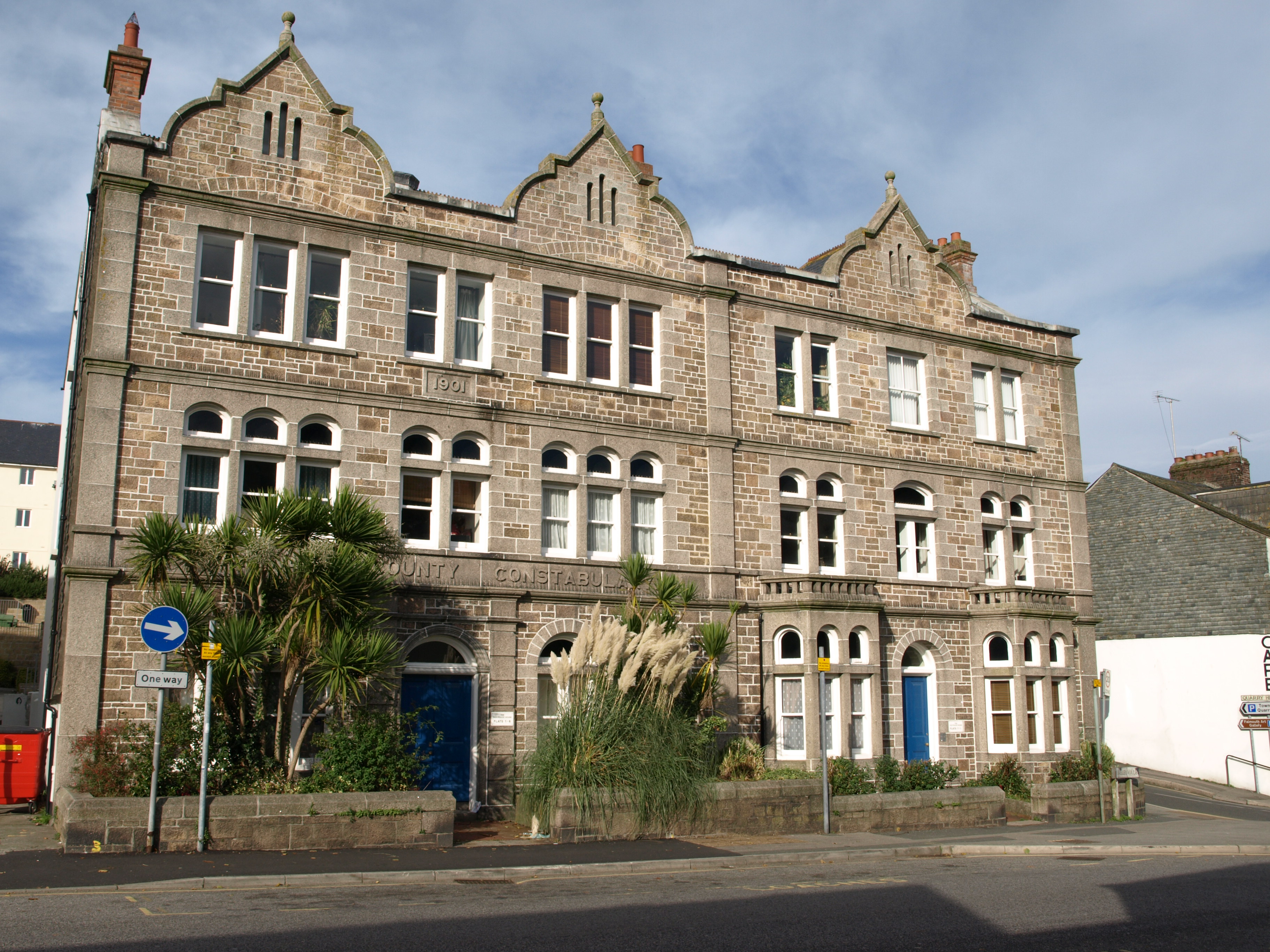
Old Constabulary

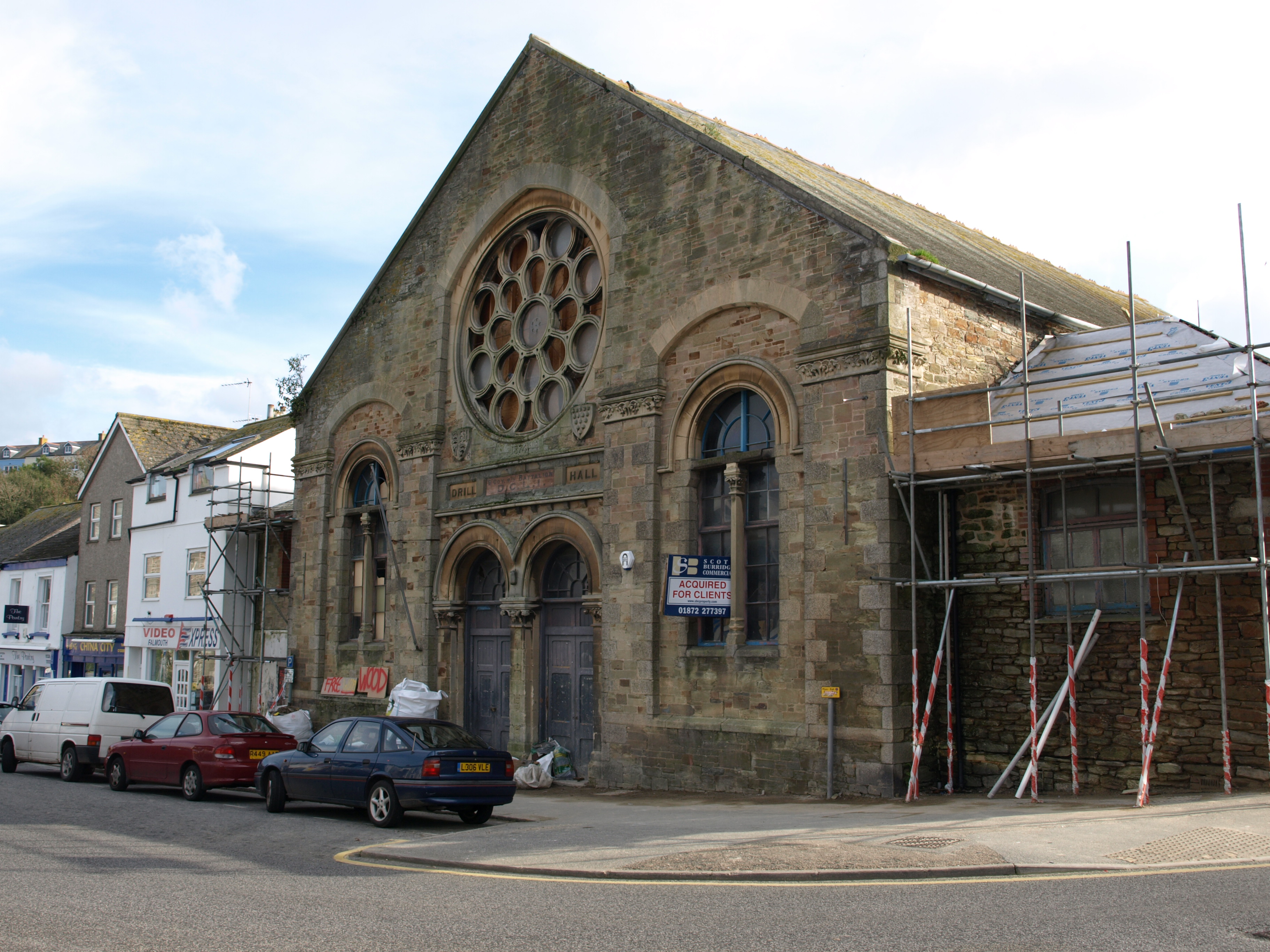
Old Drill Hall, Brook Street, prior to its conversion to the Phoenix Cinema

== Twinning ==
Falmouth is twinned with Douarnenez in Brittany, France and Rotenburg an der Wümme, in Lower Saxony, Germany.

== See also ==
- Falmouth, Jamaica
- List of topics related to Cornwall
- All Saints' Church, Falmouth
- St. Michael and All Angels Church, Penwerris
- Falmouth Synagogue
- Cornish and Breton twin towns
