= Rowe's Cornish Bakers =

British bakery chain

W.C. Rowe (Falmouth) Ltd
- A Rowe's Cornish Bakers location in Falmouth, Cornwall, 2026.
- Trade name: Rowe's Cornish Bakers
- Type: Private
- Industry: Bakery
- Founded: 1949; 77 years ago
- Headquarters: Falmouth, Cornwall, UK
- Number of locations: ▲60 (2026)
- Area served: South England & South Wales (concessions only)
- Website: rowesbakers.co.uk

W.C. Rowe (Falmouth) Ltd, trading as Rowe's Cornish Bakers, is a bakery chain operating in England and Wales, specialising in Cornish pasties. Founded in 1949, the company had, as of 2026, more than 20 bakery shops and two purpose-built production facilities. These facilities also supply businesses across the UK, including Sainsbury's, Tesco, Waitrose and The West Cornwall Pasty Company.

== History ==
Rowe's Cornish Bakers was founded in Falmouth, Cornwall, UK, in 1949 by former RAF officer Bill Rowe and his wife, Phyllis, originally operating under the name 'Rowe's Bakery'.

In 1975 the business moved to a larger bakery near Falmouth in Penryn due to a growth in demand. W.C. Rowe (Falmouth) Ltd was formally incorporated the same year on the 19th of December.

In 2003, Rowe's opened a new food factory dedicated to savoury products at Bickland Industrial Park, on the outskirts of Falmouth. In July 2014, an electrical fault caused a fire at the factory, resulting in its temporary closure. During this period, the Penryn factory took over production of pasties until the Bickland factory reopened 72 days later.

The Penryn factory continued to produce sweet baked goods until October 2018, when Rowe's relocated after 40 years of operation, as the age of the building made it increasingly difficult to meet modern food production requirements. A new 'Bakehouse', located a quarter of a mile from the former site, was opened to replace it.

In 2017 Rowe's Cornish Bakers was acquired by Iberia Industry Capital, a Luxembourg based industrial holding firm, for an undisclosed sum.

In 2026 Rowe's Cornish Bakers celebrated their 75th anniversary. As a part of the anniversary they stated that they would lower prices on a selection of their most popular items.

== Awards ==
Year	Award	Category	Result
2019	World Pasty Championships	Cornish Pasty Company	First place (Champion)
2020	World Pasty Championships	Open Savoury Company	First place, with a chicken, leek, potato and onion pasty.

== Concession Stands ==
Rowe's operates numerous concession stands at Tesco and Asda locations in England & Wales. Wales has no independent bakery stores with Rowe's only operating concession stands there.

A Rowe's concession at a Tesco Express in Oxford, England, August 2025.

== Community Involvement ==
Rowe’s is a partner of the Cornish Pirates, a rugby union team, for the 2025–26 season. They became the 'official pasty' of the Cornish Pirates on 12 September 2025 when the team played against Exeter Chiefs. Rowe's Pasties are available for purchase during games inside the club's home ground, Mennaye Field.

A Large Cornish Pasty from Rowe's Cornish Bakers, 2024

== Criticism ==
=== Employee Relations ===
On 16 January 2026, as Storm Goretti swept across Cornwall, workers at the Bickland factory in Falmouth said they felt "frightened" and "angry" after being required to remain on-site despite power failures. They also claimed they had been threatened with dismissal if they attempted to leave before receiving permission from management.

Rowe's said that half the shift present at the time of the power failure were already on break and those remaining were directed to the canteen as managers had decided it was safer to remain indoors than send them outside in the storm.

Staff were permitted to leave at 10:50pm as wind speeds had dropped significantly. One employee was offered the option to stay overnight as they were unable to get to their home as roads were blocked.
