= Helford =

Helford may refer to:

== People ==
- Bruce Helford (born 1952), American television writer and producer

== Places ==
- Helford, Cornwall, village in west Cornwall, England
- Helford Passage, village in west Cornwall, England
- Helford River, river in Cornwall, England
