= Falmouth Bay =

Body of water near Cornwall, England

Coordinates: 50.13°N 5.06°W

- Baya Aberfala (Cornish)
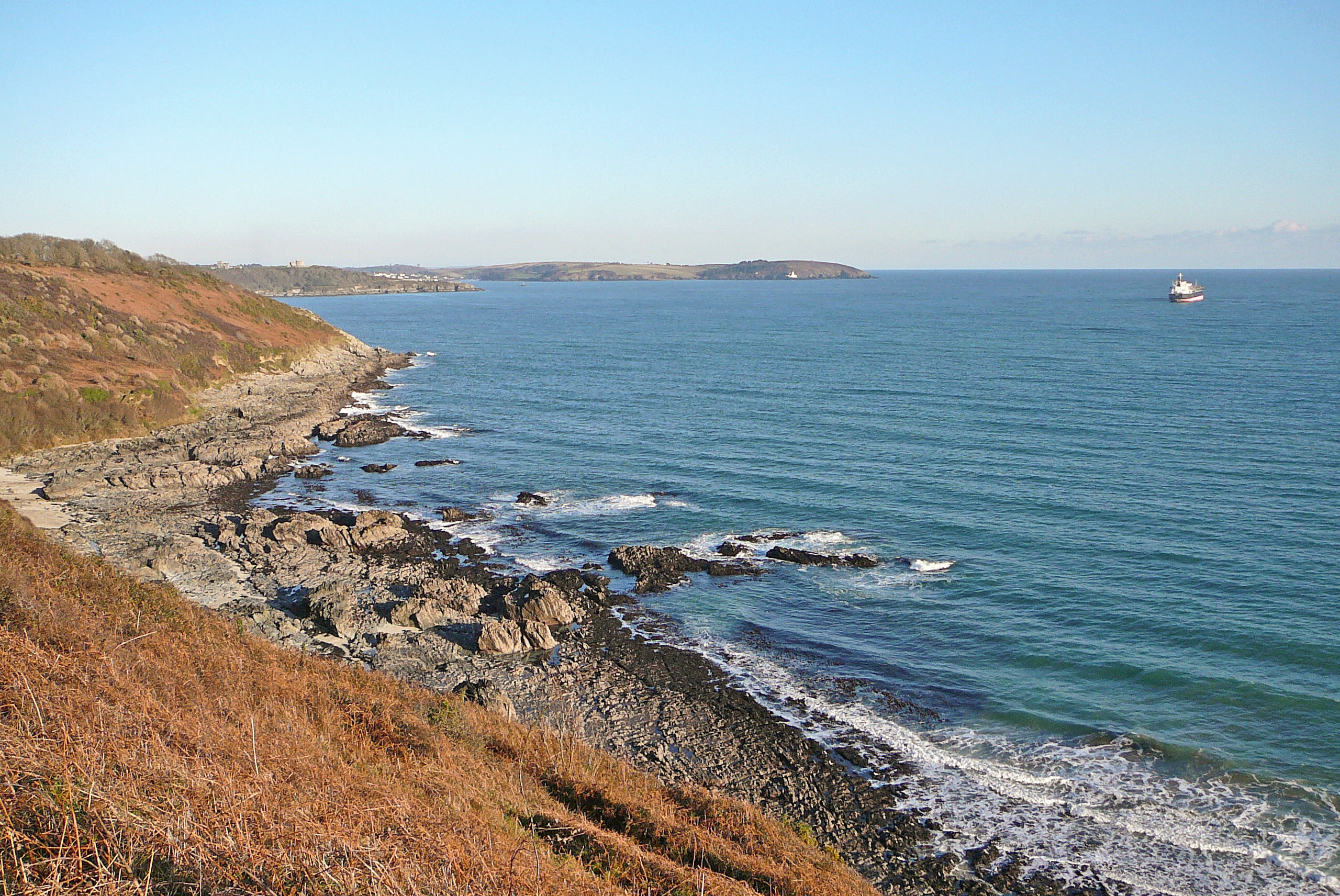

- Location within Southwest Cornwall
- Location: Cornwall, United Kingdom
- Part of: English Channel
- Settlements: Falmouth, Cornwall

Falmouth Bay (Cornish: Baya Aberfala) is a body of water off the south coast of Cornwall, England, United Kingdom, with Rosemullion Head and Pendennis Point as its extremities. It separates the estuaries of Helford River (Helford) and River Fal (also known as Carrick Roads, with the harbours of Falmouth and St Mawes).

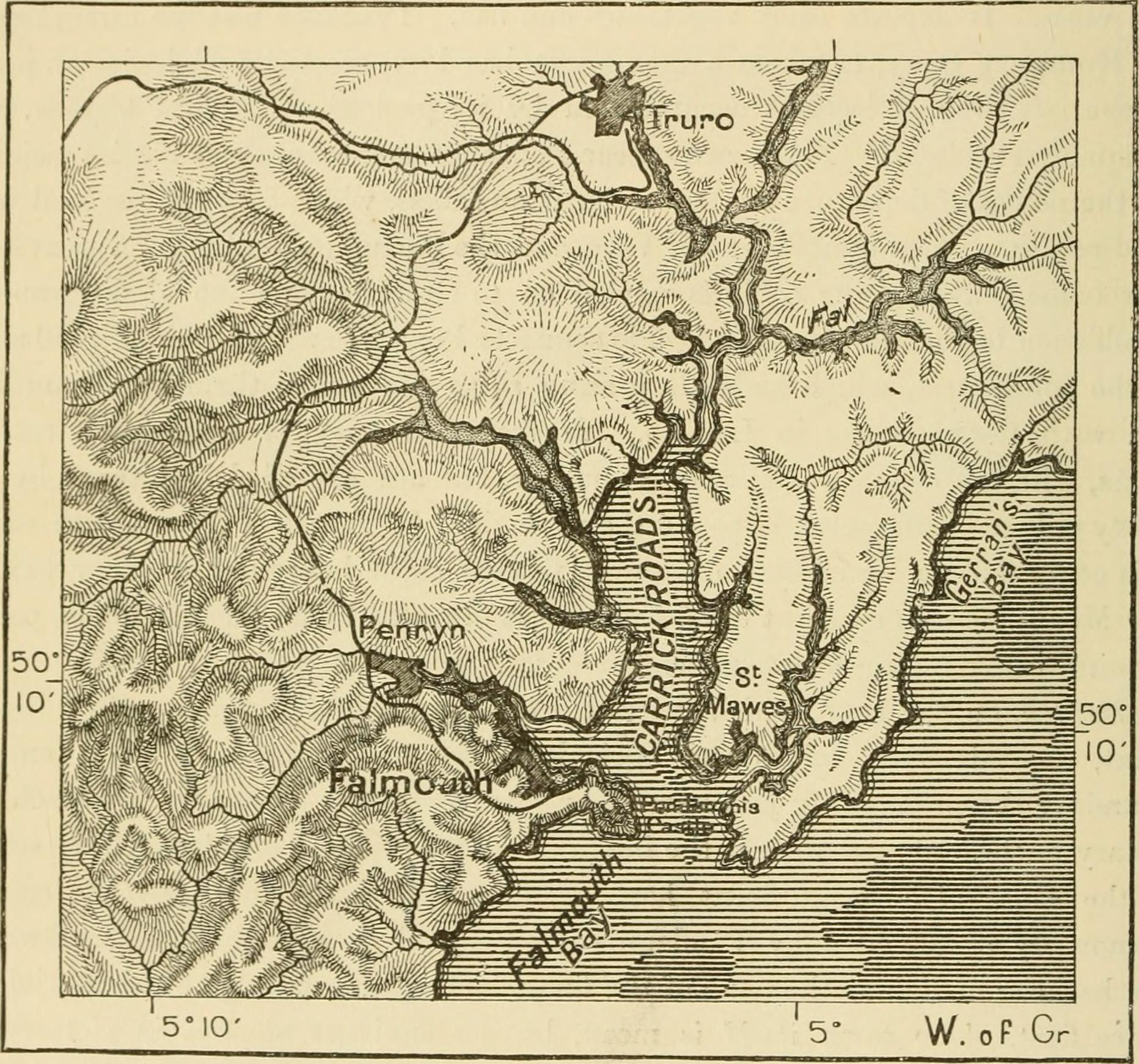
Map of the Fal district (1881)
