= Alice Hext =

Alice Hext (2 March 1865 – 14 September 1939) was a Cornish philanthropist, garden developer and magistrate. She was the owner of the Trebah Estate and leisure garden, near Falmouth in Cornwall from 1907 to her death in 1939, and generously supported the development of sports and social activities in the parishes of Constantine and Mawnan.

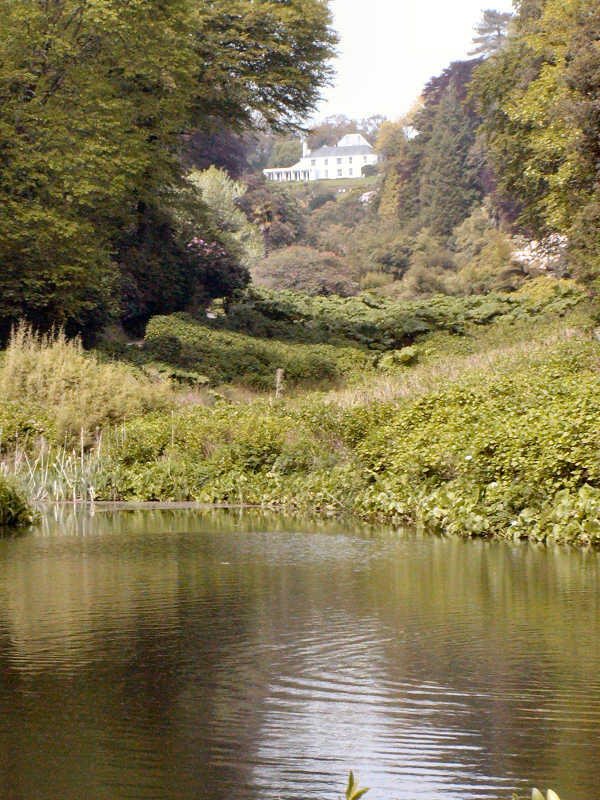
View of Trebah House from the "Mallard Pond", before the New Bridge was erected.

== Birth and marriage ==
Alice Petherick was born in St. Austell, on 2 March 1865, the daughter of George Petherick, a bank manager and his wife, Emily (born Barratt).

She married Charles Hawkins Hext, a banker, on 16 April 1891 in Kensington. Both her father and her husband bore names "well-known among West Country gentry".

Charles and Alice Hext are shown in the 1901 census as resident at Polgwin in the civil parish of Bodmin, Cornwall. Charles is described as "Retired Banker" aged 49. Alice is shown as aged 36. In 1907, they moved to Trebah. Charles Hext served as Mayor of Bodmin in 1895 and as High Sheriff of Cornwall in 1915. He died on 3 January 1917.

== Trebah Garden ==
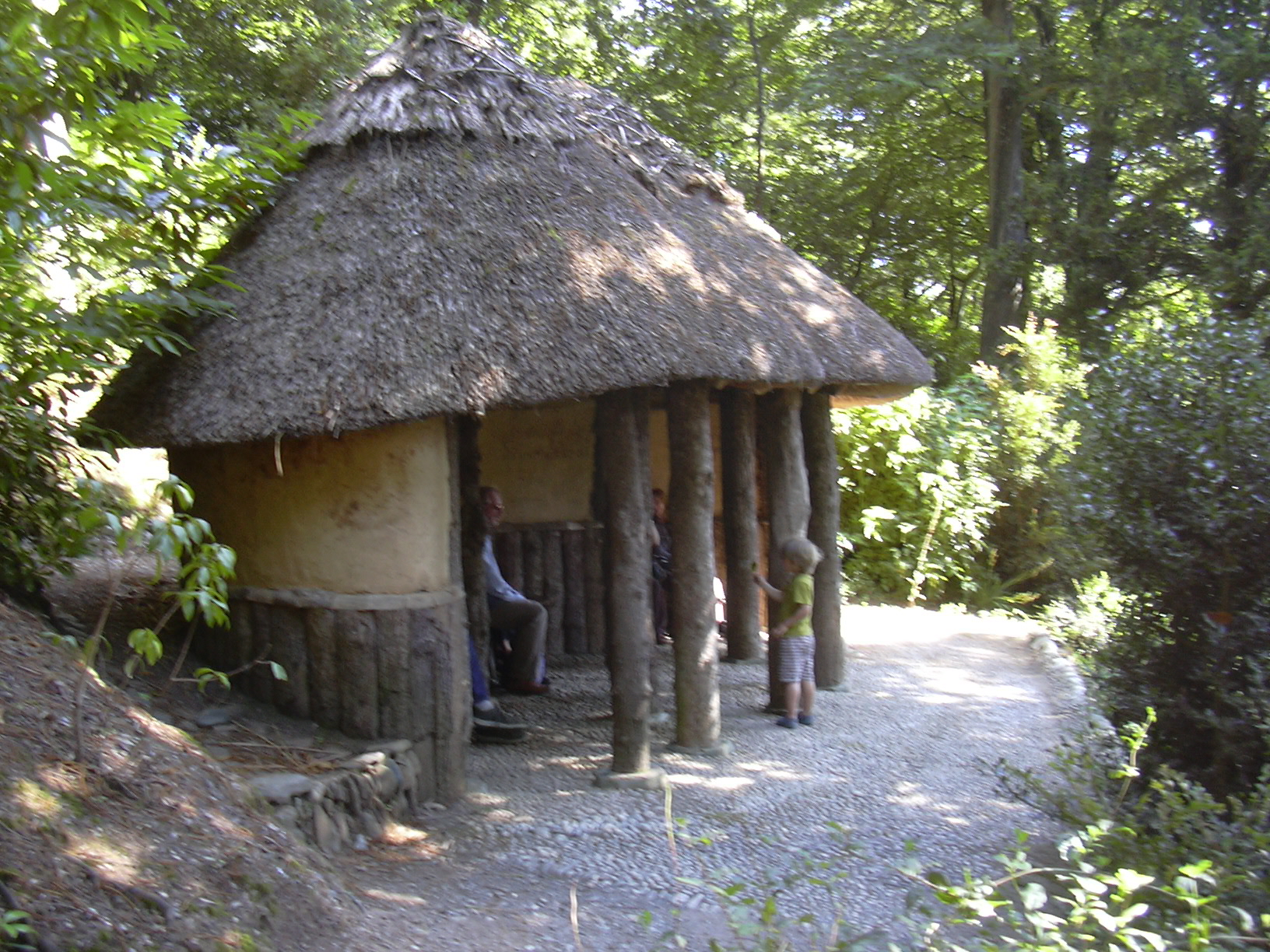
Alice's Seat at Trebah Garden

She developed Trebah Garden, the beautiful garden created by the Fox family of Falmouth, on the northern side of the Helford River at Trebahwortha, near Mawnan Smith.

"Mrs. Hext was a keen horticulturist and a frequent exhibitor at county and local garden shows and in her support of these she did much to help allotment holders and small gardeners. Her grounds were always open to the public and were often used for fetes and garden parties".

After her death, the estate was split up and the garden passed between several owners and decayed. The "lost garden" at Trebah was rescued by the Hibbert family, who established a charitable trust to enable the garden to be open to the public again. A cob and thatch arbour in the garden was restored and given the name "Alice's Seat".

== Philanthropy ==
She was a noted benefactor, to the county and in the parishes of Constantine and Mawnan. In particular, she gave the playing field and sports pavilion to the village of Constantine in 1921, in memory of her husband, Charles Hawkins Hext. There is a commemorative plaque at Constantine Social Club, recalling her generosity to the village.

== Protective covenant ==
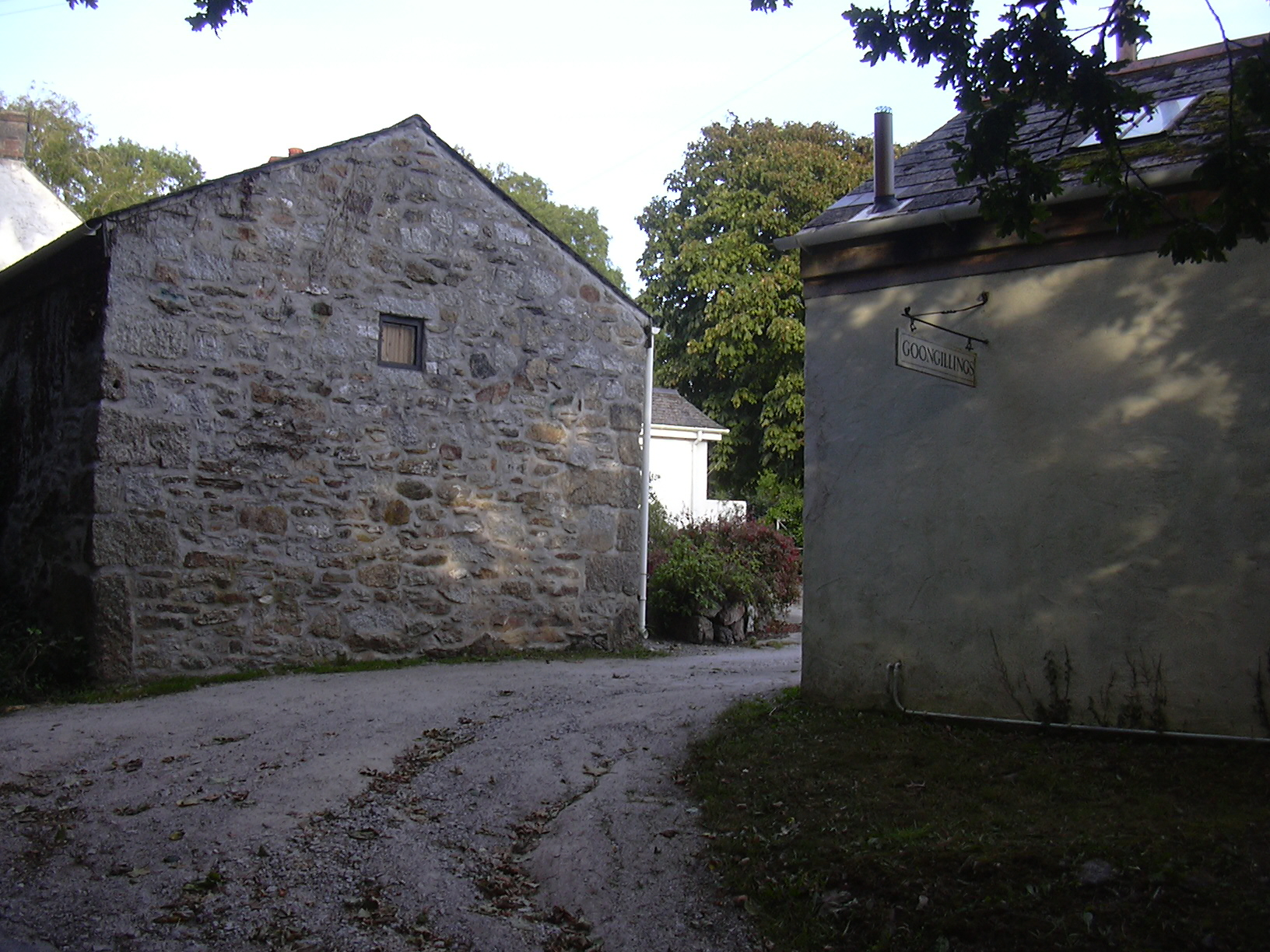
GoonGillings farm

In 1928, she acquired Goongillings Farm and rebuilt the old quay as a decorative feature. She created a public right of way, from the village of Constantine to the river, through her land and covenanted its future use against inappropriate development.

== Public service ==
She served as Justice of the Peace from June 1921 until 1939.

Her obituary in The West Briton says:

"A Justice of the Peace for the East Kerrier District, Mrs. Hext regularly attended the monthly meetings of the court at Penryn and she took a particular interest in the welfare of young people unfortunate enough to come before the magistrates.

One of her greatest interests was the Girls' Friendly Society. She was president of the county the branch, and she was constantly active in furthering the good causes of that organisation in Cornwall and beyond it.
Some years ago, she presented a fine house, Miramar, at Grove-place, Falmouth, as a G.F.S. lodge for the Truro Diocese, enabling girls to be trained there for domestic service and affording hundreds of young women from other parts of the country and from abroad to enjoy holidays under the auspices of the movement at Falmouth.
A keen advocate of every possible facility for children in both elementary and secondary schools, Mrs. Hext was a valued education worker in the county and in the Falmouth area, being associated with both the Mawnan and Constantine elementary schools, a governor of Falmouth County High School for Girls, and a frequent benefactor to the Falmouth Grammar School. When village or secondary schools were in need of some improvements, Mrs. Hext not infrequently made herself responsible for them, and she often provided prizes as an inducement to scholars in some particularly commendable direction.

In the Constantine-Mawnan area she was interested in and almost invariably a helper in, anything for the betterment of village life. She gave to Constantine its present recreation ground and pavilion, and in both villages she supported sporting and social organisations, almost without exception".

== Death and legacy ==
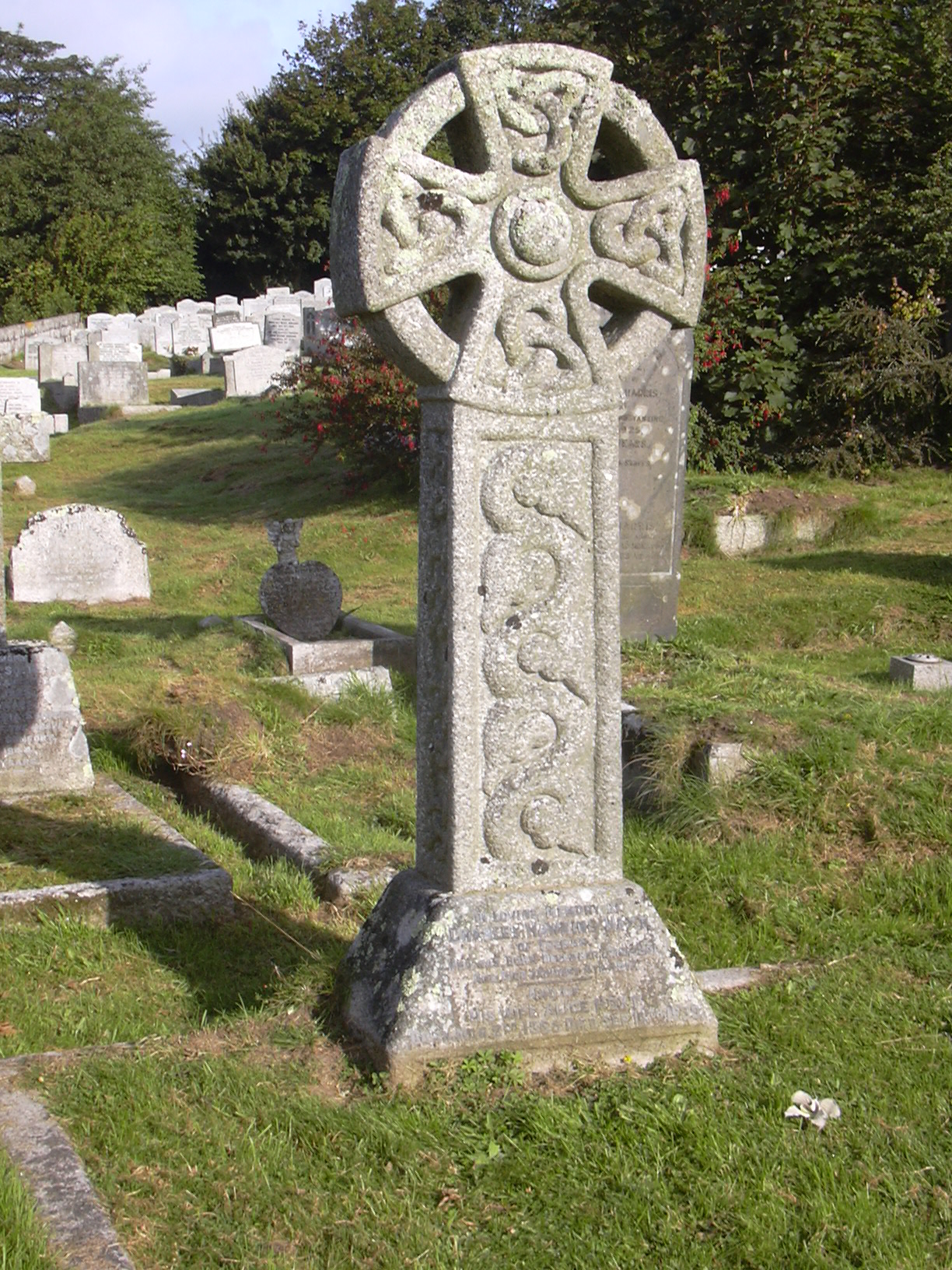
Grave of Charles Hawkins Hext and Alice, his wife, at Constantine Church, near the south wall of the "new" burial ground.

She died on 14 September 1939, and was buried in the churchyard of Saint Constantine's church.

"Among the wreaths were tributes from the presidents, vice-presidents and members of the Truro Diocesan Council of the G.F.S.; Constantine Parochial Church Council, Constantine Nursing Association, Constantine Recreation Committee, Constantine Garden Society, the teachers and pupils of Ponjeravah Day Schools, Constantine Branch of the G.F.S.; the indoor staff; the outdoor staff; and "the garden she loved".

Also present were a number of her nieces and nephews, including the MP for Penryn and Falmouth, Maurice Petherick.

The Girls Friendly Society no longer functions in Falmouth but is a global organisation. The Constantine Sports and Social Club, that she endowed, still functions and the land she protected from development by covenant is still green. The garden that she and Charles Hext developed gives much pleasure to many people.
