= Mawnan =

Civil parish in south Cornwall, England

Coordinates: 50°06′N 5°06′W

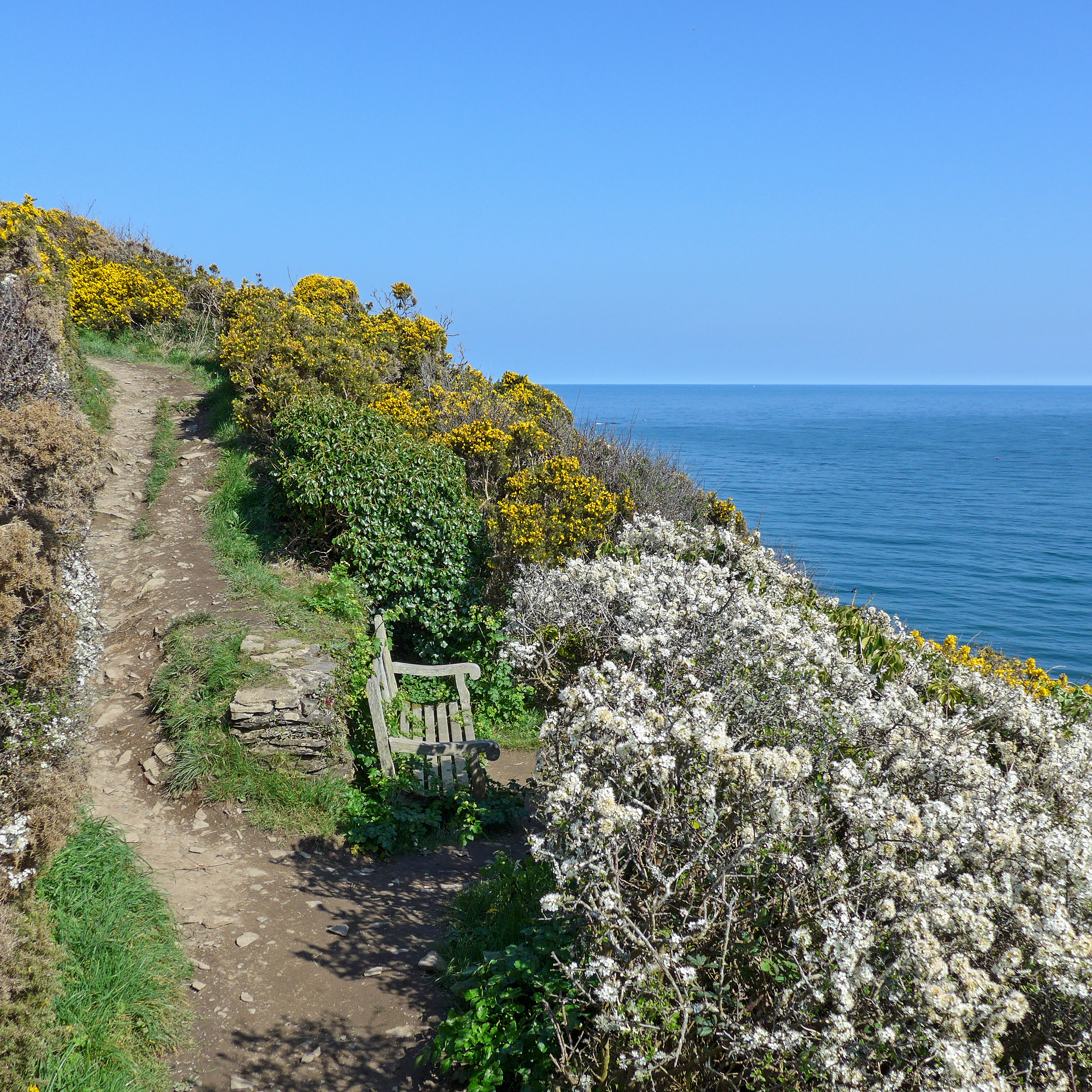
Cornwall Coast Path, Mawnan

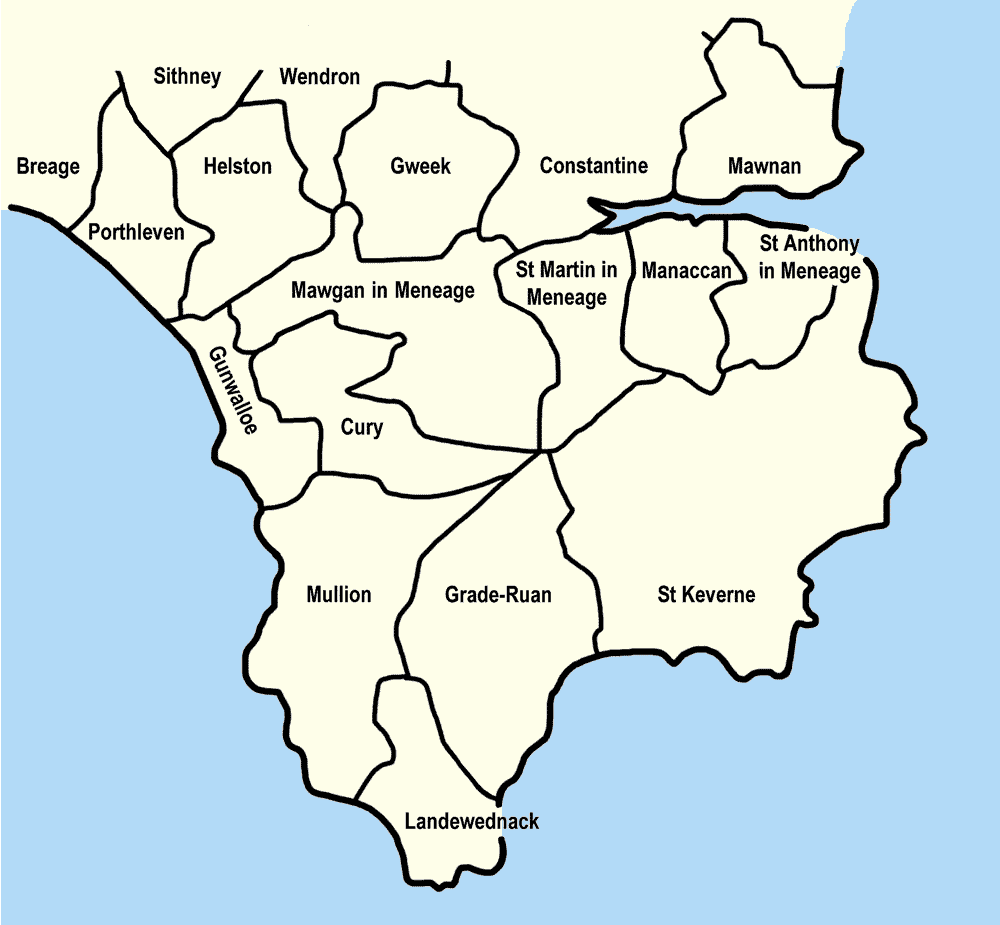
Mawnan (top right) in relation to surrounding parishes

Mawnan (Cornish: Maunan, meaning St Maunan) is a village and civil parish in south Cornwall, England, United Kingdom. It is in the former administrative district of Kerrier and is bounded to the south by the Helford River, to the east by the sea, and to the west by Constantine parish. The population was 1,454 in the 2001 census, rising slightly to 1,476 at the 2011 census. The church town of the parish is Mawnan Church, also known simply as Mawnan, and the only large village in the parish is Mawnan Smith, approximately three miles south of Falmouth.

== Geography ==
The parish is entirely rural and, as well as Mawnan Smith, includes the hamlets of Carlidnack, Bareppa, Penwarne, Helford Passage, Maenporth and Durgan. The parish also contains several Victorian gardens, now open to the public: Glendurgan, Trebah, Carwinion, and Penjerrick.

The coastline and cliffs south-east of the church town from Toll Point to Rosemullion Head forms the Rosemullion SSSI (Site of Special Scientific Interest), noted for its geological and biological interest. Marine species found here include Mytilus mussels, various seaweeds and sea sponges, such as Botryllus schlosseri.

Mawnan lies within the Cornwall Area of Outstanding Natural Beauty (AONB) and the South West Coast Path follows the coast of the parish.

== Etymology ==
It is suggested that Mawnan takes its name from a 6th-century Saint Maunanus, who was probably a Breton monk who landed here about AD 520.

== Churches ==
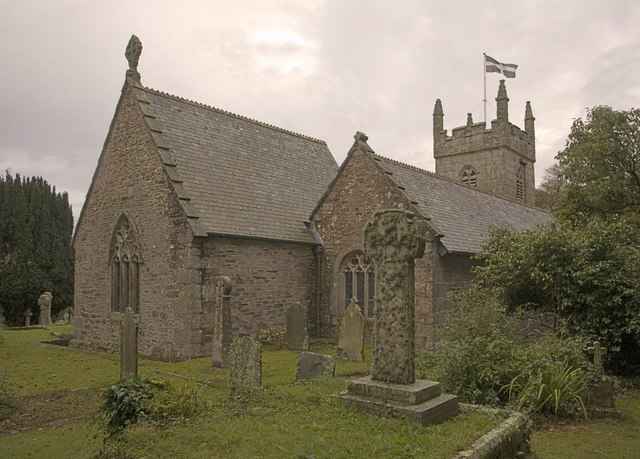
Mawnan parish church

There are two Anglican churches: the 13th century parish church, the Church of St Mawnan and St Stephen in Mawnan Church and the 19th century Church of St Michael in Mawnan Smith village. The land for St Michael's Church was given by the Rogers family of Carwinion and the building was completed in 1874. John Rogers was rector here from 1807 to 1838.

The village of Mawnan Smith also has a Methodist chapel. There is a Roman Catholic church dedicated to St Edward the Confessor in Old Church Road, which was completed in 1965.

== Notable houses and gardens ==
Notable country houses in the parish include Bosloe, Bosveal, Carwinion, Penwarne, Nansidwell (c. 1905 by Leonard Stokes), Heyle and Bareppa. At Glendurgan and Trebah are fine 19th-century houses developed by the Fox family of Falmouth.
