= Helford Passage =

Village in Cornwall, England

Coordinates: 50.09991°N 5.12989°W

Helford Passage: Cornish: Trethmahonyer
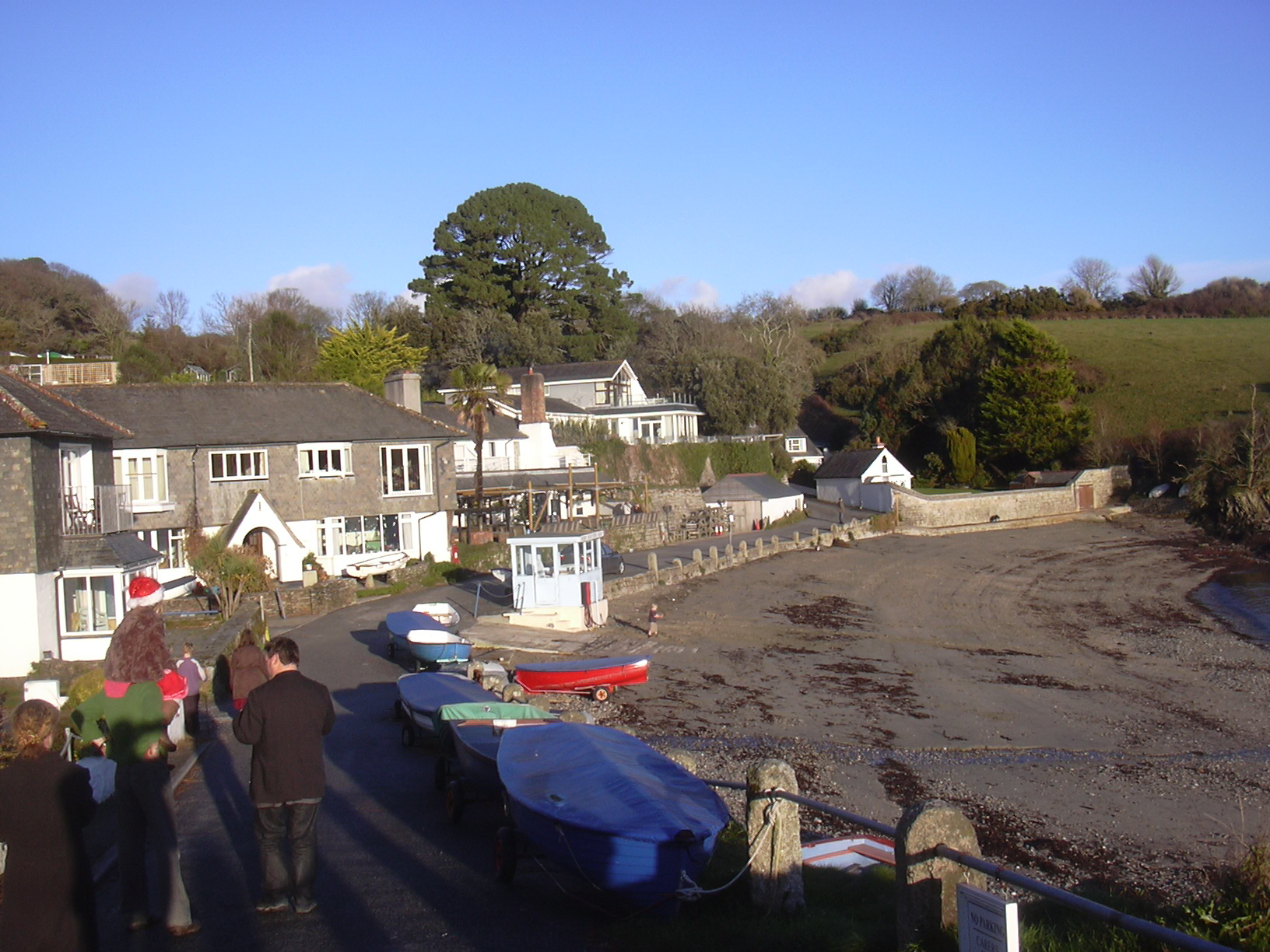
- Unitary authority: Cornwall
- Region: South West
- Country: England
- Sovereign state: United Kingdom
- Post town: Falmouth
- Postcode district: TR11
- Police: Devon and Cornwall
- Fire: Cornwall
- Ambulance: South Western

Helford Passage (Cornish: Trethmahonyer, meaning Mahonyer (i.e. Helford) crossing) is a village in west Cornwall, England, United Kingdom. It is situated on the north bank of the Helford River opposite Helford approximately five miles (8 km) south-southwest of Falmouth. The village is in the civil parish of Mawnan; before 1986, it was in the parish of Constantine.

A pedestrian ferry operates daily from Easter to October between Helford Passage and Helford

Helford Passage lies within the Cornwall Area of Outstanding Natural Beauty (AONB).

The gardens at Trebah, the National Trust's Glendurgan Garden, are a short walk away.
