= Carlidnack =

Hamlet in Cornwall, England

Coordinates: 50.121°N 5.108°W

- Location within Cornwall
- OS grid reference: SW779292
- Civil parish: Mawnan
- Unitary authority: Cornwall
- Ceremonial county: Cornwall
- Region: South West
- Country: England
- Sovereign state: United Kingdom
- Post town: FALMOUTH
- Postcode district: TR11
- Dialling code: 01326
- Police: Devon and Cornwall
- Fire: Cornwall
- Ambulance: South Western
- UK Parliament: Falmouth and Camborne

Carlidnack (or Carlinack) is a hamlet in the parish of Mawnan, Cornwall, England. Carlidnack lies 2.7 miles (4.3 km) south-west of Falmouth on a road leading north-east from Mawnan Smith and at around 495 feet (151 m) above sea level.

There is evidence of an ancient settlement at Carlidnack called a round that dates back to the late Iron Age or Roman period. This is a scheduled ancient monument that has been listed by English Heritage. The round is a circular area enclosed by a bank of earth and a ditch and with a single entrance; a round is usually a sign of an agricultural settlement. The round at Carlidnack has a bank that is 4 yards (3.7 m) high, a ditch that is 0.7 yards (0.64 m) deep and has a diameter of 140 yards (130 m); there are modern buildings on the site that date back to the early 20th century.
