= Tony Hibbert (British Army officer) =

WWII officer and winemaker (1917–2014)

James Anthony Hibbert MBE MC (6 December 1917 – 12 October 2014), was a British Army officer who fought in the Second World War. During a military career that began in 1935 and ended in 1947, Hibbert saw action in the Battle of France, the North African Campaign, the Italian Campaign and Operation Market Garden. After those battles, he led a T-Force unit in Operation Eclipse, a campaign carried out by the Allies shortly before V-E Day.

In civilian life after his time in the army, Hibbert enlarged and diversified his family's wine and spirits business. His restless first retirement, which began in the early 1970s, was followed by a 1981 retirement attempt that led his wife and him to ownership of Cornwall's Trebah Garden, which they went on to restore to its prewar splendour.

In 2009, after nearly sixty years of marriage, Hibbert became a widower. Five years later, he died peacefully at home.

== Early life and career ==
James Anthony Hibbert was born in Chertsey, Surrey. The son of a Royal Flying Corps pilot, Hibbert decided to enter the British Army while he was in Germany working as a vineyard apprentice for his family's wine business. Having seen that Germany was preparing for war, he returned to England in 1935 and applied to the Royal Military Academy. His father, who thought Germany would not go to war after the defeat thar it had suffered in the First World War, was upset by his decision to abandon his apprenticeship.

In January 1938, Hibbert was commissioned into the Royal Artillery. On 9 September 1939, less than ten days after the German invasion of Poland, he arrived in Cherbourg, France, with the British Expeditionary Force. In the Battle of Dunkirk, he commanded a half-battery that defended the Allies' northern perimeter for four days. On 1 June 1940, with his ammunition supply depleted, he was forced to destroy his guns. Evacuated from Dunkirk on the tugboat "Sun X", Hibbert was mentioned in dispatches that described his meritorious actions in the face of the enemy and were sent to the high command.

== 1st Parachute Brigade ==
In October 1940, Hibbert joined the original No. 2 Commando, the initial unit of the paratrooper corps Winston Churchill had called for after the debacle in France. Having been redesignated No. 11 Special Air Service Battalion in November 1940, the unit became the 1st Parachute Battalion the following September. As part of the newly formed 1st Parachute Brigade, it was soon part of the emergent 1st Airborne Division.

Hibbert served in the North African Campaign, during which he became a staff officer, and in the Italian Campaign. In July 1944, after he had attended the Staff College at Camberley, he became brigade major of the 1st Parachute Brigade.

On 17 September 1944, the first day of the ill-fated Operation Market Garden, Brigade HQ, led by Hibbert, and the 2nd Parachute Battalion, led by Lieutenant-Colonel John Frost, reached the Arnhem road bridge, their intact objective in the operation. In the operation's plan, the bridge had had to be held for only two days, but the two units, along with other elements of the 1st Airborne Division, held its northern end, against fierce opposition, for three. While leading a remnant group in withdrawal from the bridge, toward nearby Oosterbeek, where the rest of the Division was still fighting, Hibbert was captured by the Germans.

After escaping from a truck in which he and other prisoners were being transported to a prisoner-of-war camp in Germany, Hibbert was sheltered by the Dutch Resistance. Most British and Polish troops who had not been killed, captured or wounded in the attempt to take Arnhem were successfully withdrawn from the area in Operation Berlin. Hibbert and other officers of the 1st Brigade regrouped and planned Operation Pegasus by which well over 100 sheltered men, including them, got out of the area a month thereafter. Shortly after the men crossed the Rhine, under cover of darkness, and were met by E Company, 2nd Battalion of the 506th Parachute Infantry Regiment of the 101st Airborne Division, that had been sent to retrieve them, Hibbert's leg was broken, when a jeep on whose bonnet he was riding was in a collision. The five months' hospitalisation this cost him was, in his words, a "thoroughly unsatisfying climax" to a "thoroughly unsatisfactory battle."

== Operation Eclipse ==
Having been all but destroyed in Operation Market Garden, the 1st Airborne Division saw no action in the war's remainder, but Hibbert's own participation in the conflict continued. In April 1945, still on crutches, Hibbert was discharged from hospital. On the morning of 5 May, in part of Operation Eclipse, he led a T-Force from Lübeck to the German port city of Kiel. The force consisted of some hundreds of men from the 5th King's Regiment of the British Army and the 30th Assault Unit of the Royal Navy.

Swedish intelligence reports that the Red Army would violate the Yalta Agreement and advance from Germany to Denmark had prompted Operation Eclipse. The capture of Denmark would have given the Soviet Union a postwar port free of the ice that blocked its own port of Murmansk several months each year. By establishing Allied control of Kiel and of the German scientific bases between that city and the Danish border, Hibbert's force forestalled such a Soviet move. It also denied the Soviets the city of Kiel and its warm water port, on the shore of the Baltic, as well as its access to the North Sea via the Kiel Canal.

Although the German forces in northwestern Germany had surrendered at Lüneburg Heath the evening before, the officers of the German Navy in Kiel were convinced they had not surrendered. The German troops north of the Kiel Canal were reluctant to hand in their arms. Even so, Hibbert and his small force established their authority in a city with tens of thousands of German fighters. No other Allied force arrived until 7 May, when troops of the 15th Division moved into the city.

On V-E Day, 8 May, Hibbert was placed under arrest by the British military. His advance to Kiel had required him to go north of Bad Segeberg in apparent violation of the surrender terms that had been agreed at Lüneburg Heath. The advance had been made on orders from the 21st Army Group, whose Chemical Warfare branch controlled T-Force operations, but there was a question whether the 21st Army Group had had the authority to issue such an order.

Hibbert was absolved of blame the next day by his Corps Commander and released, but the arrest meant that his "rather frustrating military career", as he himself later put it, had ended with "a certain artistic symmetry." On 3 September 1939, the day the British declared war, he had been arrested for crashing his Battery Commander's command car and was exonerated. He thus spent the first day and the last day of the war under arrest.

== Later life ==
Invalided out of the Army in 1947, Hibbert returned to CG Hibbert, his family's wine and spirits business, which was on the verge of collapse. Finding "the cut and thrust of commercial life", as he put it, "as exciting as war with no prisoners taken," he turned the firm around and rose to be its managing director. Among the diverse fields to which he extended it was soft-drink canning in which he introduced the ring pull can to the United Kingdom. He received the Queen's Award for Industry.

In 1960, on land that he owned at Lymington, Hibbert formed Salterns Sailing Club, which is run for and by youngsters ("with some adult help"). As a sailor himself, he competed worldwide in the International Moth Class of dinghy, which he helped to invent.

Hibbert tried twice to retire. His first retirement, in 1972, was to Devon, where he entered upon a gentleman farmer's life, which did not suit him. For his second retirement, in 1981, his wife and he sought a house with "no work, no worries and no responsibilities". When they bought Trebah, Cornwall, they dreamt of "the quiet pleasures of retirement, mornings spent drinking gin on the terrace and summer afternoons sailing and fishing from the beach". Not until they had received a visit from the Secretary of the Cornwall Garden Society, eight days after they had moved in, would they learn that they had purchased what had once been one of England's most beautiful and important gardens. What began as a three-year commitment on their part to restore the garden became a decades-long open-ended undertaking that gave them what Hibbert called the happiest years of their lives.

In 2006, Hibbert was presented an MBE for his contribution to tourism and sailing.

Hibbert's wife, Eira Bradshaw Hibbert, died in 2009.

In 2009, in recognition of the heroism of the Dutch who sheltered and aided members of the 1st Airborne Division after the Battle of Arnhem, Hibbert donated his Military Cross to the Hartenstein Museum, in Oosterbeek. He had received the award in 1945 for his actions at Arnhem Bridge and during the escape after the battle there.

In 2010, Kiel bestowed its Great Seal on Hibbert for keeping the city from being captured by the Soviets at the end of the Second World War. With respect to being honoured by what had been the enemy, Hibbert remarked that he couldn not imagine that "many people have been honoured by both sides".

Hibbert died at his home on 12 October 2014, at the age of 96. At the time of his death, Trebah Garden ranked as one of Cornwall's biggest horticultural attractions. The garden was in the hands of the Trebah Garden Trust, which the Hibberts had created and to which they had donated it. The garden had opened to the public in 1987, after their first six years of work in its restoration.

Hibbert's funeral took place 3 November 2014 at the parish church of the village of Mawnan Smith, the location of Trebah Garden. Lieutenant Colonel Giles Timms, Commanding Officer of 4th Battalion, Parachute Regiment, observed that Hibbert's legacy lives on in the Hibbert Sword, presented annually to the most-promising officer of the airborne forces.
