= Penrose, Cornwall =

National Trust estate in England

Penrose
- Pennros (Cornish)
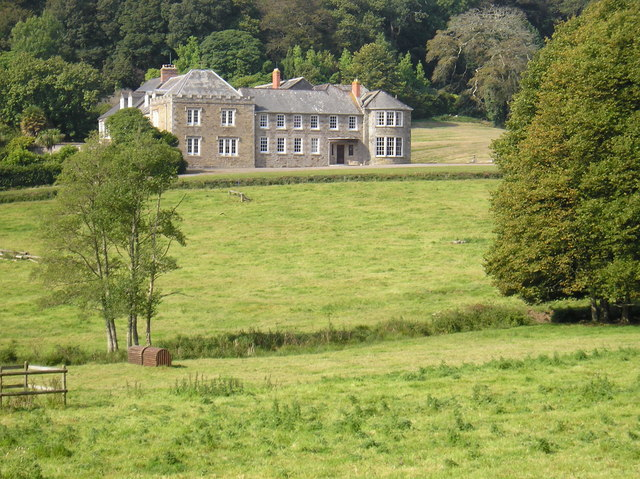

- Location within Cornwall
- 50.084°N 5.299°W
- Location: Porthleven, Cornwall, England

Listed Building – Grade II*
- Official name: Penrose Manor House
- Designated: 24 March 1950
- Reference no.: 1196347

Penrose (Cornish: Pennros) is a house (in private ownership) and National Trust estate amounting to 1536 acres, east of Porthleven and in the civil parish of Sithney, Cornwall, England. The estate includes Loe Pool and Loe Bar which was given into the ownership of the National Trust in 1974 by Lt. Cdr. J. P. Rogers, and stretches along the coast to Gunwalloe. The estate was owned by the Penrose family for several hundred years before 1771 when it was bought for £11,000 by the Rogers family, whose descendants still reside in Penrose House.

== Toponymy ==
'"Penrose'" means 'head of the moor' (or according to Craig Weatherhill 'end/head of a hill-spur') in Cornish. This Penrose was formerly Penrose Methleigh (Penros Methle, 1367) i.e. 'end/head of a hill-spur at Methleigh'. The first documentation of an owner here – John de Penrose – was in 1281.

There are seven other places named Penrose in Cornwall, in the parishes of Breage, Budock, Luxulyan, Sennen, St Breward (Penrose Burden), St Columb and St Ervan.

== House and estate ==
=== Penrose House ===
Penrose House is located at OS Grid Ref: SW 640 258. The current Grade II listed house consists of an irregular square plan ranged around a small courtyard with 17th-century U-shaped plan front to the northwest. The 17th-century country house was constructed for the Penrose family, probably for John Penrose who died in 1679; remodelled and extended from c. 1788 for John Rogers and c. 1832 for the Reverend John Rogers; extended 1863 by William Webb for John Jope Rogers; remodelled 1867; buttery added 1868 and centre of the elevation towards Loe Pool rebuilt 1927–28.

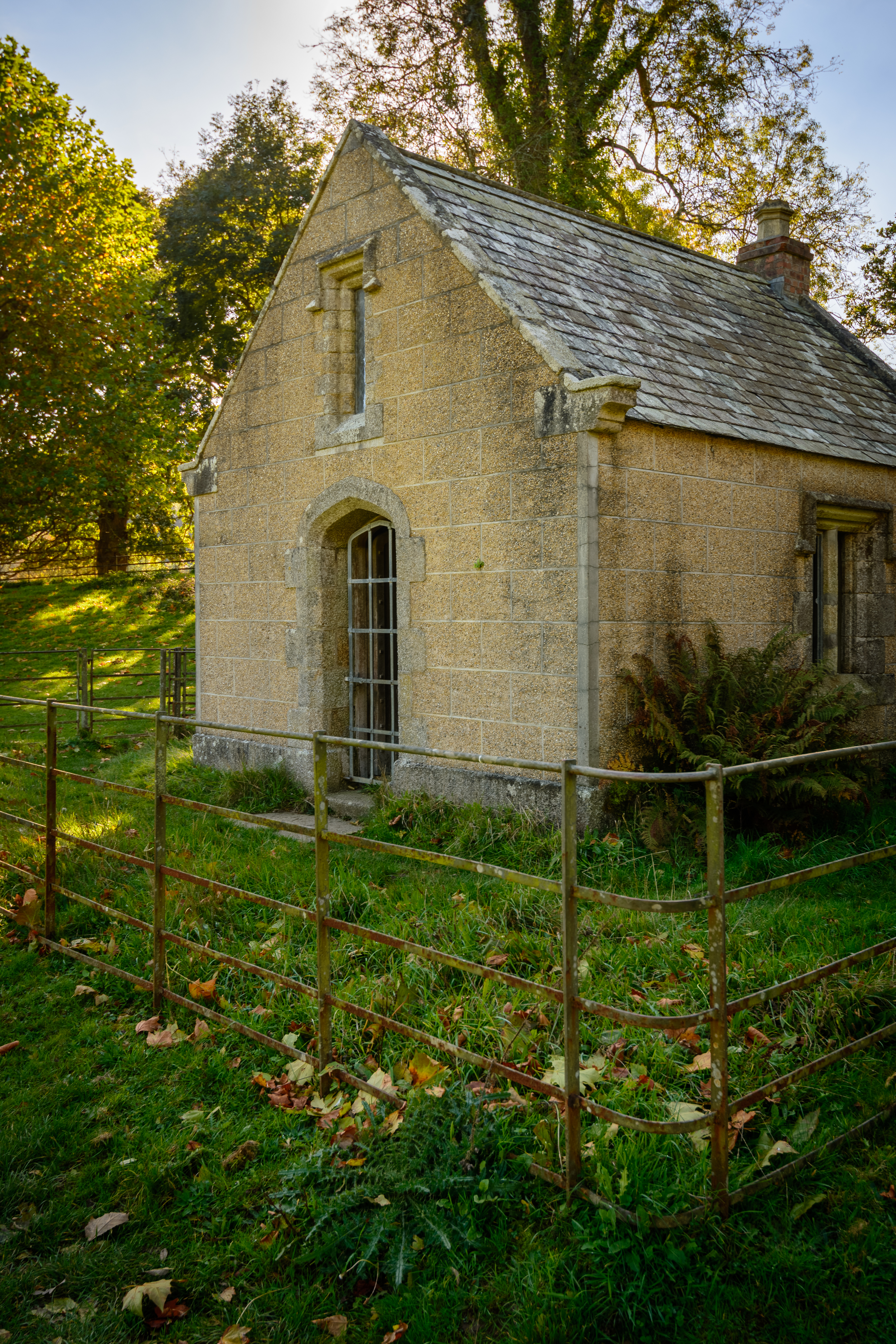
The bath house and well head east of Penrose Manor

=== Bath house and well head east of Penrose Manor House ===
Bath house and well head east of Penrose Manor House are located at OS Grid Ref: SW 641 259. The Tudor Gothic style Bath house was built in 1840 for John Rogers. The bath house contains a slate lined bath on the right and a rounded well head to the rear.

=== Carpenter's shop ===
The carpenter's shop, situated 100 metres to the southwest of Penrose Manor House at OS Grid Ref: SW 640 256, was built pre-1833 for John Rogers.

=== The Loe ===
The Loe, also known as Loe Pool and historically called La Loo, is the largest natural freshwater lake (50 hectares (120 acres)) in Cornwall and now in the ownership of the National Trust. Lieutenant commander Rogers's gift to the National Trust was made in 1974; a condition of the gift was that the Loe should be kept as a place of great beauty for people to enjoy without distraction. Boating, swimming and fishing are not allowed.

== History ==
Penrose (or at least some land) was held by the Penrose family pre-1269. The estate grew as a result of various grants of land and inheritances some of which resulted from marriages linking the Penroses with other leading Cornish families including: St Aubyn, Tremayne, Methele, Erissey, Killigrew and Rashleigh. Between 1750 and 1770 Penrose was bought by Hugh Rogers. Hugh Rogers and his son the Reverend John Rogers carried out many of the major alterations and additions at Penrose.

=== Descent of Penrose estate ===
==== John de Penrose ====
John de Penrose was the owner in 1281.

==== John Rogers of Treassowe ====
John Rogers of Treassowe, Ludgvan, died in the late 17th-century, leaving a son (John) by his wife Florence. The coat of arms of Rogers of Penrose and Treassowe is Arg. a chevron between three bucks trippant Sa.; their crest is a buck as in the arms.

==== John Rogers (1636–1725) ====
John Rogers married Thomasine, daughter of Hugh Bawden of Guddern, Kea, leaving a son John.

==== John Rogers (1690–1768) ====
John Rogers married his cousin Aurelia, daughter of Hugh Bawden of Guddern, leaving a son Hugh.

==== Hugh Rogers (1732–) ====
Hugh Rogers married Anne, daughter of James Bishop of St Columb, leaving a son John. He purchased the estate in 1771 from Mrs. Cummings, the heir to the Penrose Estate.

==== John Rogers (1750–1832) ====
John Rogers (15 August 1750 – 22 February 1832) was married to Margaret, the daughter of Francis Basset of Tehidy; he was MP for Helston, Cornwall, from 1784 to 1786.

==== John Rogers (1778–1856) ====
The Rev. John Rogers (17 July 1778 – 12 June 1856) succeeded to the Penrose and Helston estates of about ten thousand acres (40 km²), comprising the manors of Penrose, Helston, Carminow, Winnianton, and various other estates in Cornwall, including several mines, in February 1832 on the death of his father. According to the obituary, of his son John Jope Rogers (published in The Cornishman) the Penrose lands had been acquired in 1771 by his grandfather, Hugh Rogers, and the Helston lands in 1798 by his father. Rogers died at Penrose on 12 June 1856, and was the first occupant of the family vault at Sithney churchyard. He was an Anglican priest, mine-owner, botanist, mineralogist, and scholar of Hebrew and Syriac.

==== John Jope Rogers (1816–1880) ====
John Jope Rogers (16 February 1816 – 24 April 1880) was an author and Conservative MP for Helston from 1859 to 1865.

==== John Peverell Rogers (1846–1928) ====
John Peverell (born 7 November 1846 – 21 August 1928) was a captain in the Royal Regiment of Artillery.

==== John Lionel Rogers (1880–1961) ====
Captain John Lionel Rogers, who died on 5 November 1961, was married to Caroline Ford of Pengreep, without issue; his younger brother gave up his right of succession in favour of his eldest son, Lieutenant Commander J. P, Rogers.

==== John Peverell Rogers (1925–2012) ====
Lt. Cdr. John Peverell Rogers (1925 – 7 July 2012) was married to Angela, having two sons Nigel (deceased) and Charles (deceased 2018). He served in the Royal Navy until 1962 and ran the estate for around ten years, having taken it over from his uncle Lionel Rogers. In 1974 he handed a large part of the estate, including farms, properties and woodland, to the National Trust and continued to run the remainder himself.

==== Charles Rogers (1956-2018) ====
Charles Rogers died in August 2018, apparently without an heir.

==== Jordan Adlard Rogers (1987–) ====
In 2019, Jordan Adlard Rogers proved he was the son of the previous owner, by a DNA test, and inherited the remaining parts of the estate still owned by the Roger’s family and the right to reside in Penrose House.
