= Glendurgan Garden =

National Trust garden situated above the hamlet of Durgan

Glendurgen Garden
- Glynn Dowrgeun
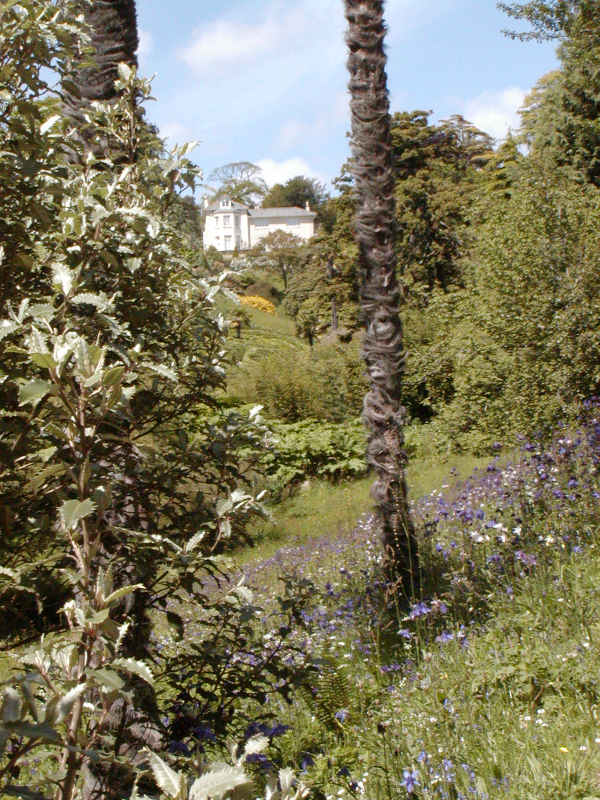
- Interactive map of Glendurgen Garden
- Location: Cornwall, United Kingdom
- Coordinates: 50.107073°N 5.117429°W
- Created: 1820s-1830s
- Opened: 1962
- Owner: National Trust
- Website: www.nationaltrust.org.uk/visit/cornwall/glendurgan-garden

Glendurgan Garden (Cornish: Glynn Dowrgeun, meaning deep valley of otters) is a National Trust garden situated above the hamlet of Durgan on the Helford River and near Mawnan Smith, in the civil parish of Mawnan, Cornwall, England, United Kingdom.

Glendurgan Garden was laid out by Alfred Fox in the 1820s and 1830s. In 1962 Glendurgan Garden was given to the National Trust by Cuthbert and Philip Fox.

The garden is notable for a cherry laurel maze, created in 1833.

== Views of Glendurgan ==
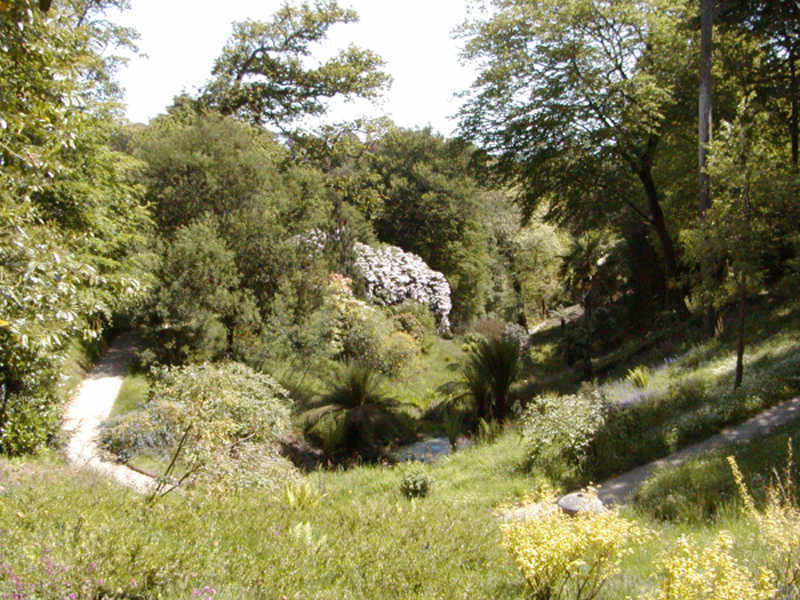
View of Glendurgan

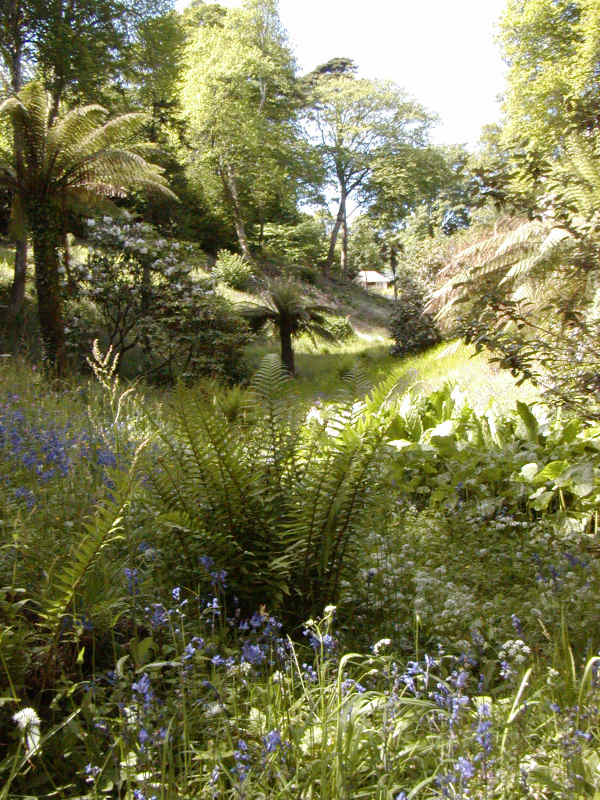
View of Glendurgan

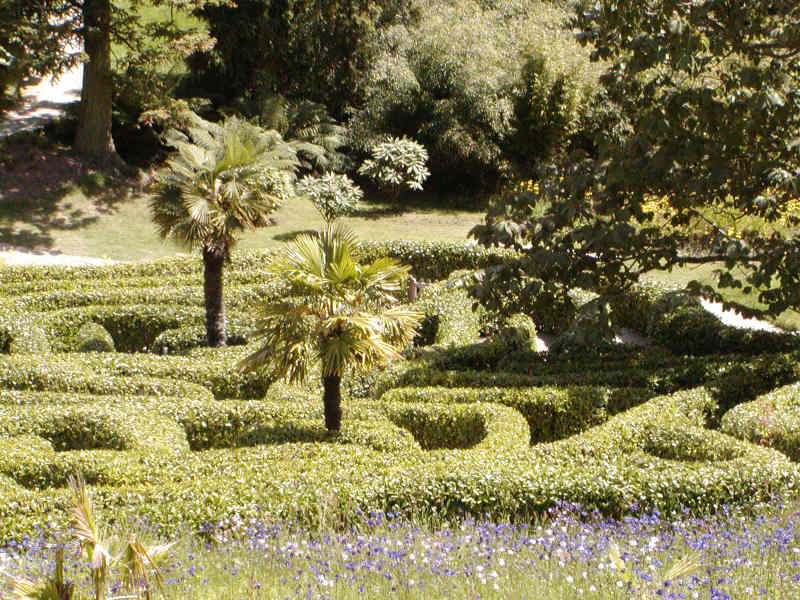
Glendurgan maze

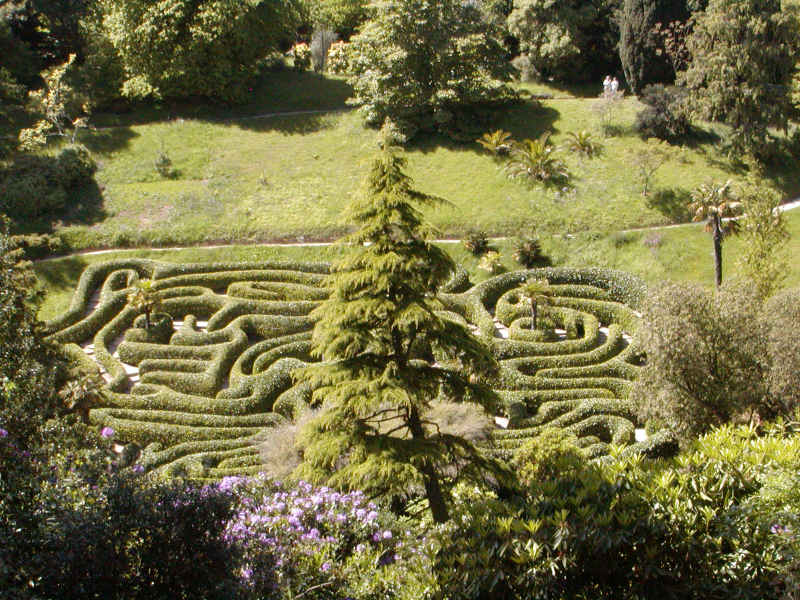
Glendurgan maze

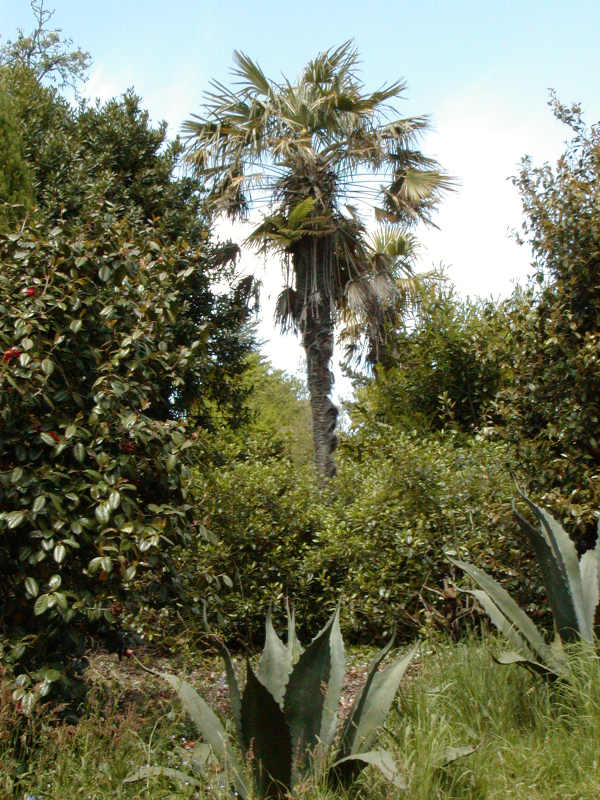
Trachycarpus fortunei in Glendurgan

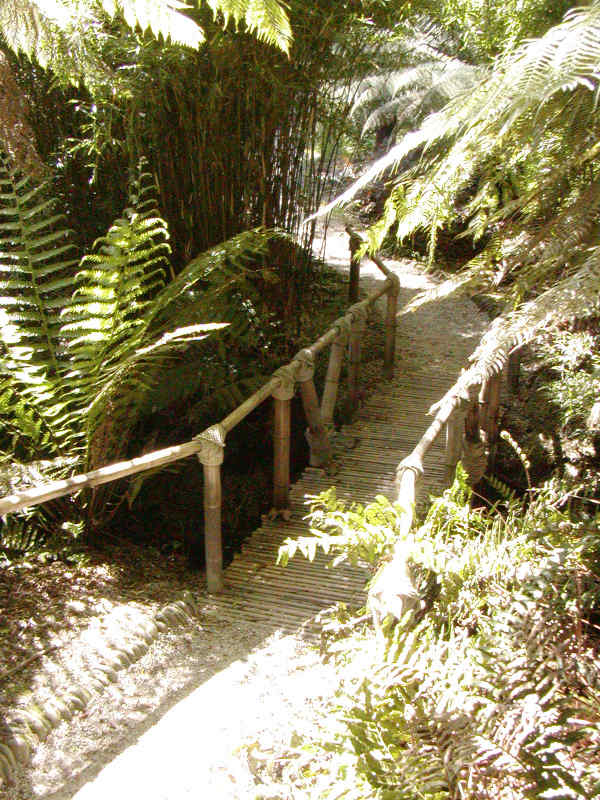
Glendurgan bamboo jungle

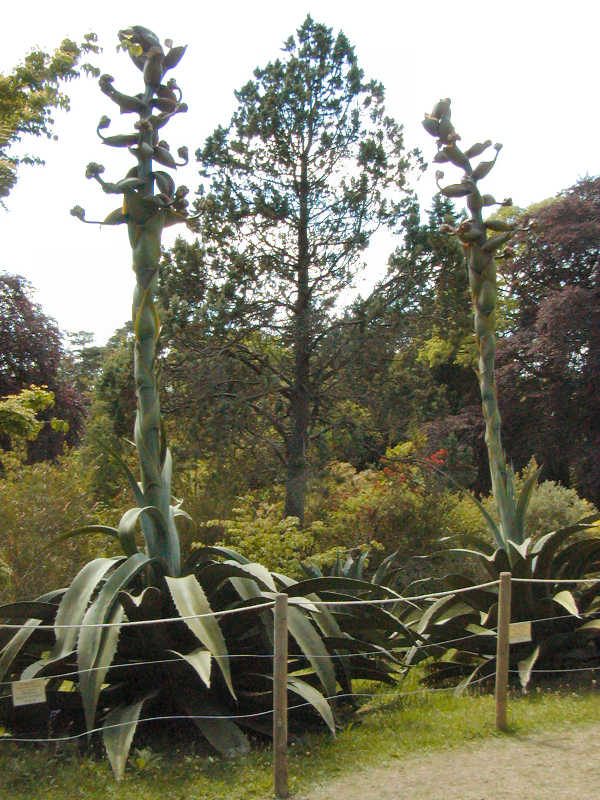
Agave buds in Glendurgan in May 2004, about 8 ft in height

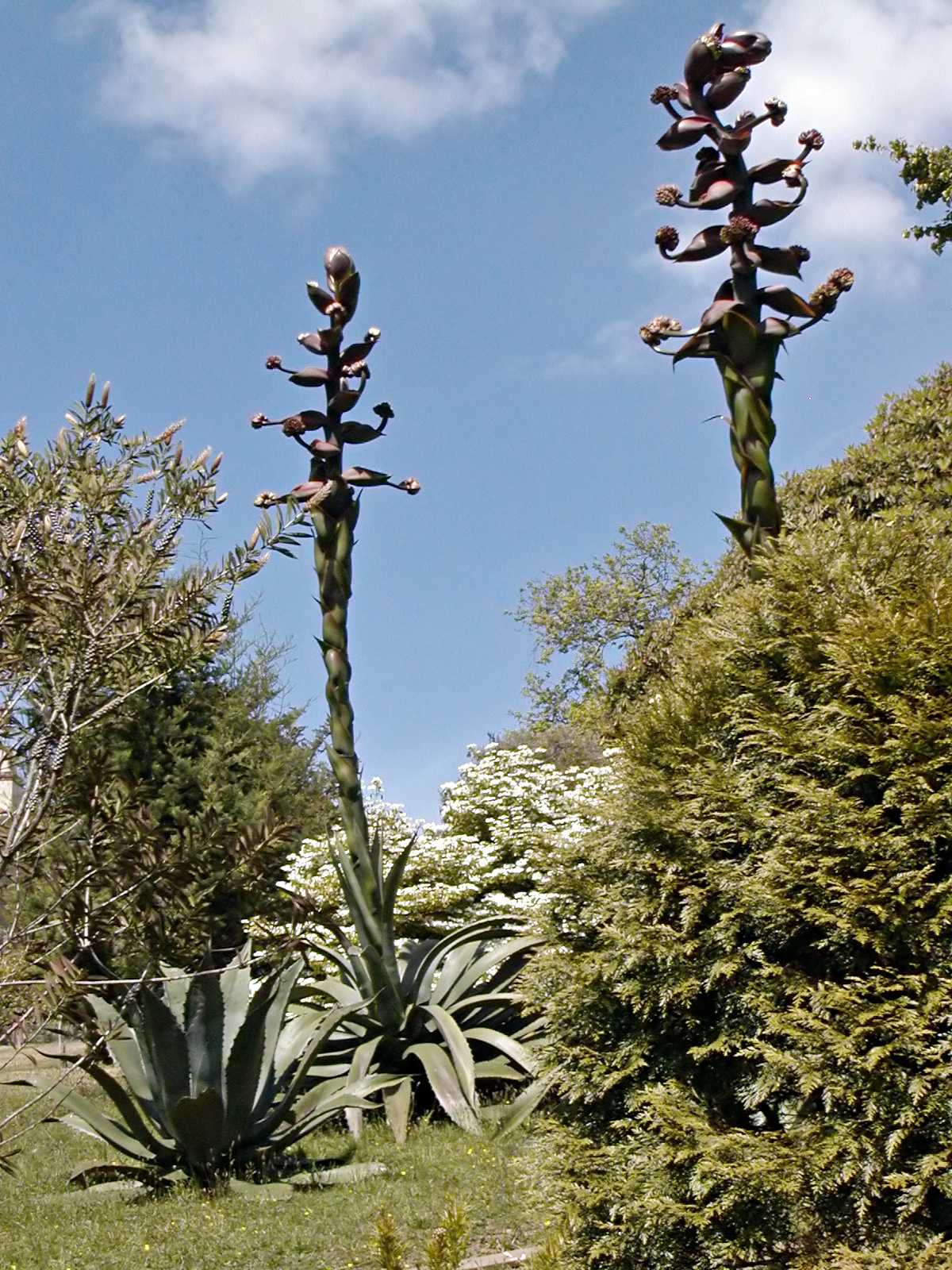
Agave buds in Glendurgan in May 2004, about 8 ft in height
