= Trebah =

Garden in Cornwall, England

Trebah Gardens
- Lowarth Treverybow

- Location within Cornwall
- Type: Tropical garden
- Location: Cornwall, United Kingdom
- Nearest town: Falmouth
- Coordinates: 50.104143°N 5.123246°W
- Opened: 1987
- Website: www.trebahgarden.co.uk

Trebah (Cornish: Lowarth Treverybow) is a 26-acre (110,000 m^{2}) sub-tropical garden situated in Cornwall, England, UK, near Glendurgan Garden and above the Helford River (grid reference SW767273). Part of the parish of Mawnan, the gardens are set within an area of the same name, which includes the small settlements of Trebah Wartha and Trebah Woolas, both of medieval origin.

== History of Trebah ==
In 1831 Trebah was acquired by the Fox family who built Glendurgan Garden. Trebah was first laid out as a pleasure garden by Charles Fox, a Quaker polymath of enormous creative energy who paid meticulous attention to the exact positioning of every tree. His son-in-law, Edmund Backhouse, M.P. for Darlington, took the work further.

=== The Hexts ===
In 1907 Trebah was bought by Charles Hawkins Hext and inherited on his death in 1917 by his wife, Alice, who died in 1939. From 1939 to 1981 the garden fell into decline, since the substantial Trebah Estate was sold off in small packages, of which the house and garden was one.

=== Second World War and after ===
During the Second World War, Trebah was used for military purposes and the assault on Omaha Beach in Normandy was launched from Polgwidden Beach, at the foot of Trebah Garden.

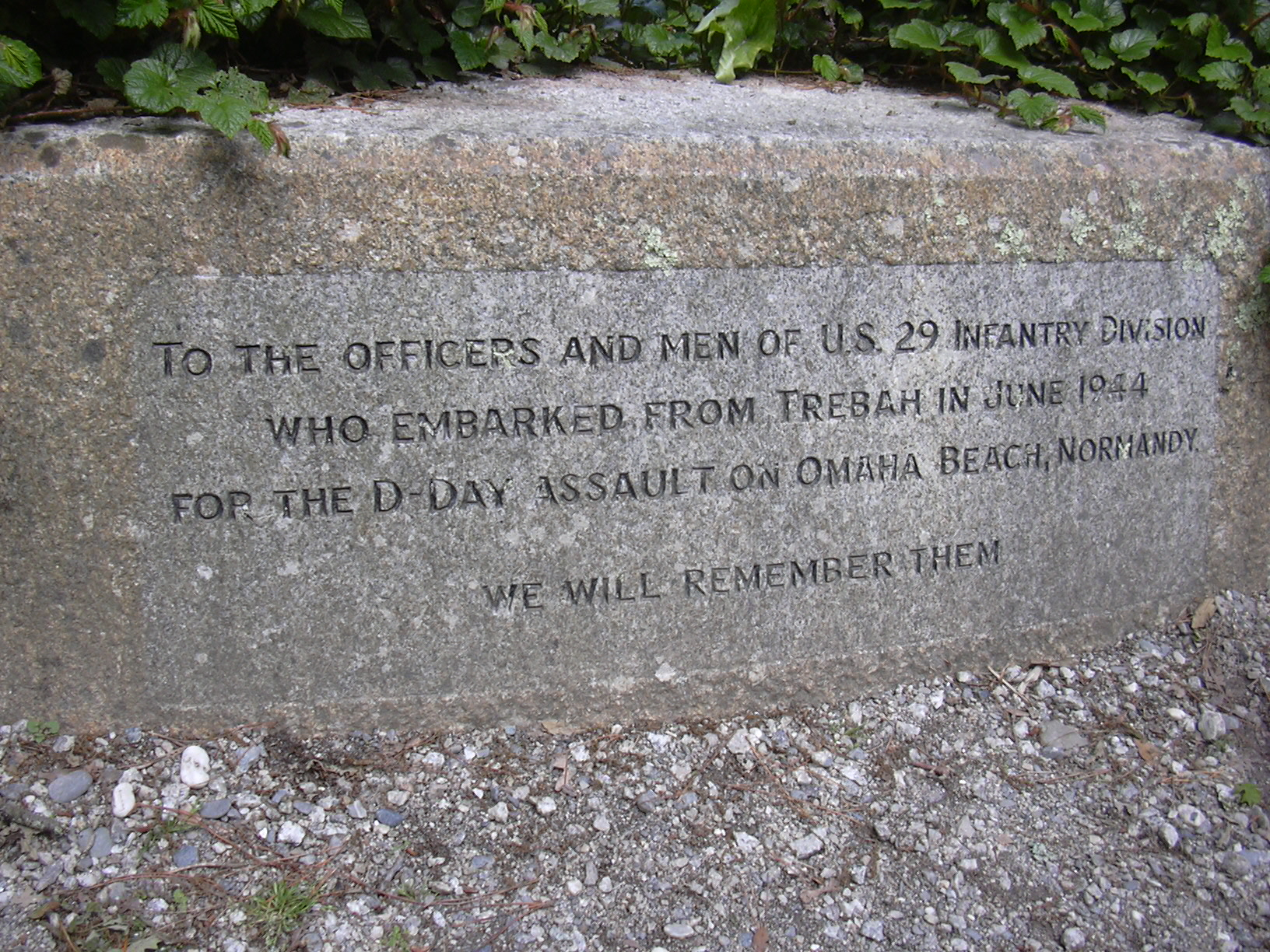
Inscription on Memorial Slab at the foot of Trebah Garden: "To the officers and men of the U.S. 29th Infantry Division, who embarked from Trebah in June 1944 for the D-Day assault on Omaha Beach. We will remember them."

One of the subsequent owners was Donald Healey, the motor car designer, who removed some of the concrete military structures and provided a boathouse on the beach.

=== Development of the garden by the Hibberts ===
In 1981, on their 64th birthday, Tony Hibbert and Eira Hibbert bought Trebah as their retirement home. They were persuaded to give up the first three years of retirement to restore the garden.

Indeed, when Major Hibbert agreed to three years, little did he know it would become a quarter century. The decision, he eventually wrote, "has given us the happiest twenty-four years of our lives and had we not taken up the challenge we'd have been dead long ago of gin poisoning and boredom."

=== The Trust ===
The garden was opened to the public in 1987 and by 1989 visitor numbers had reached 36,000. The Hibbert family then gave the house, garden and cottages to the Trebah Garden Trust, a registered charity, to ensure that the garden could be preserved for future generations.

In 2000 visitor numbers had exceeded 105,000 and a £1.94 million grant from the Heritage Lottery Fund and Objective One allowed Trebah to build the new 'Hibbert Centre', to rebuild Alice Hext's seat, restore the nursery and carry out major landscaping and garden improvements.

== Views from Trebah ==
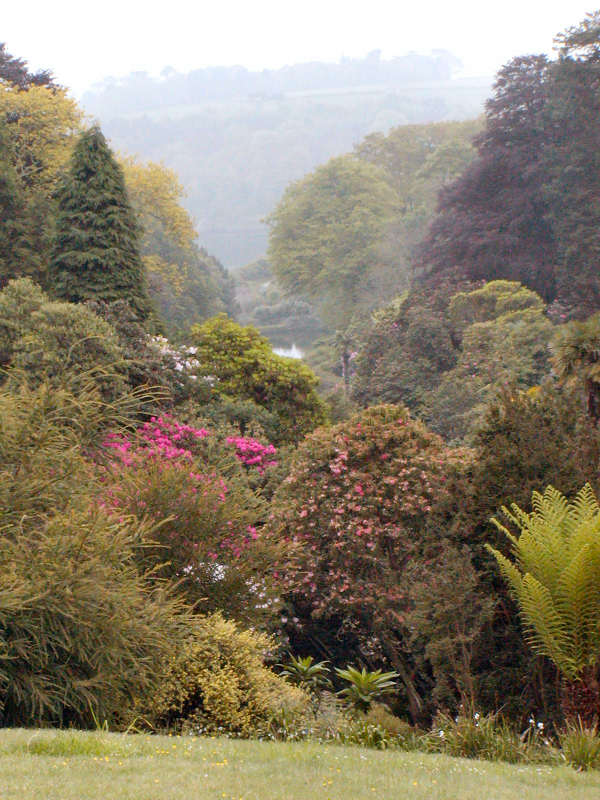
View down the valley

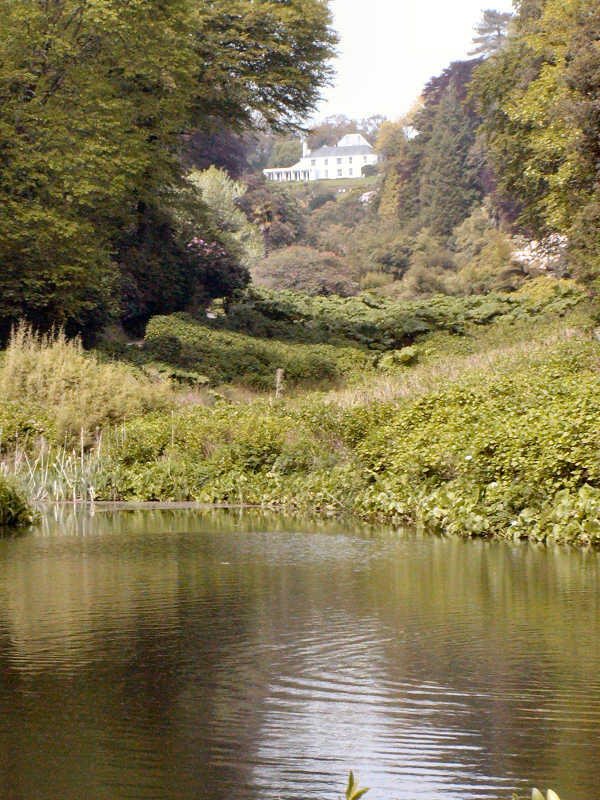
View up the valley

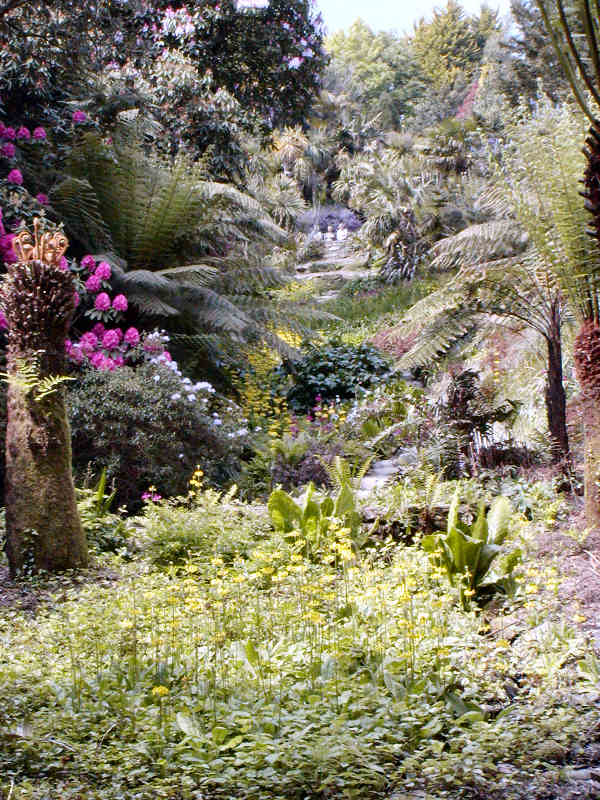
Trebah view

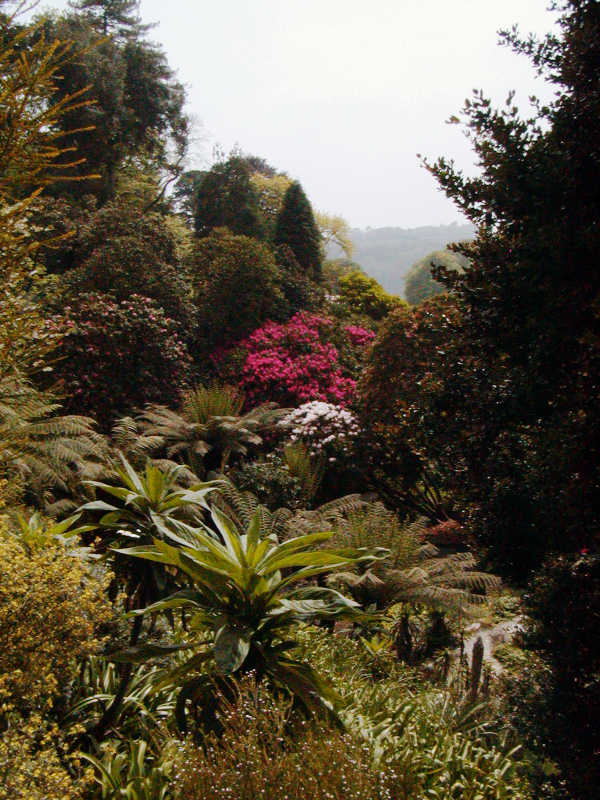
Trebah view

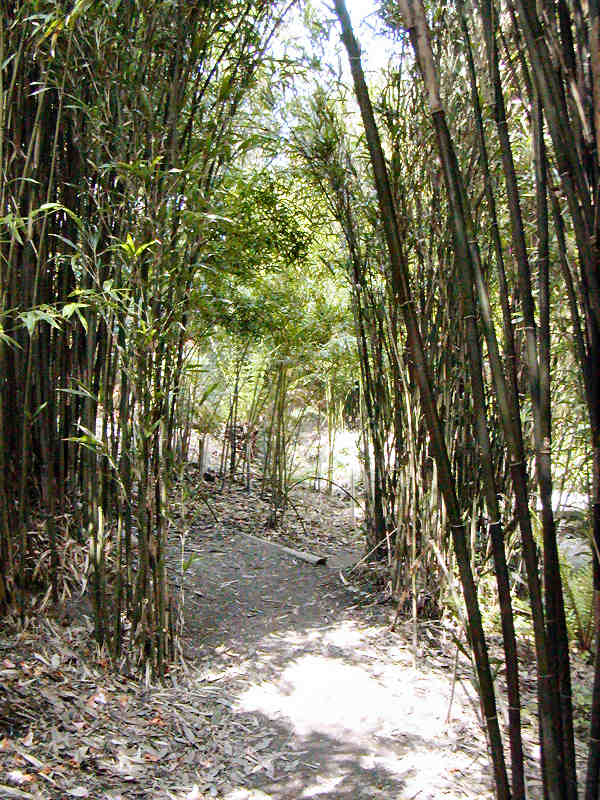
Bamboo Garden

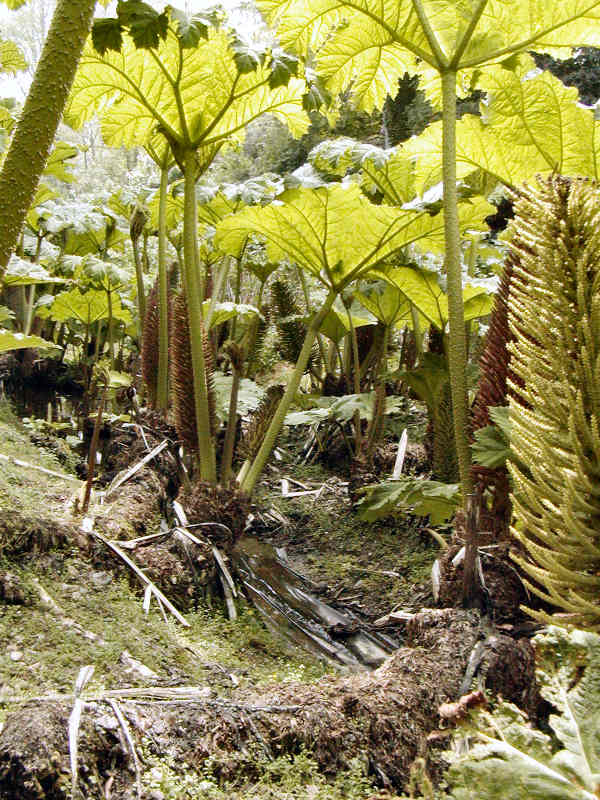
Gunnera jungle

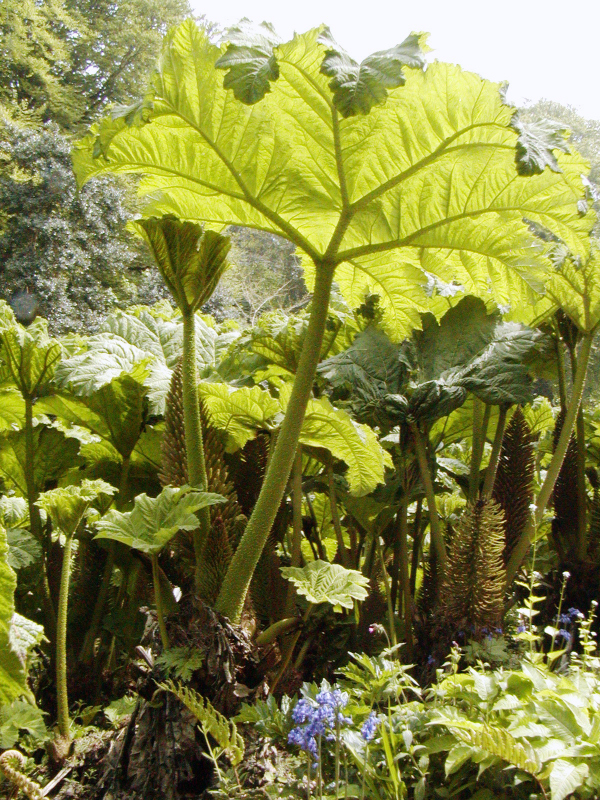
Gunnera about 6½ ft in height

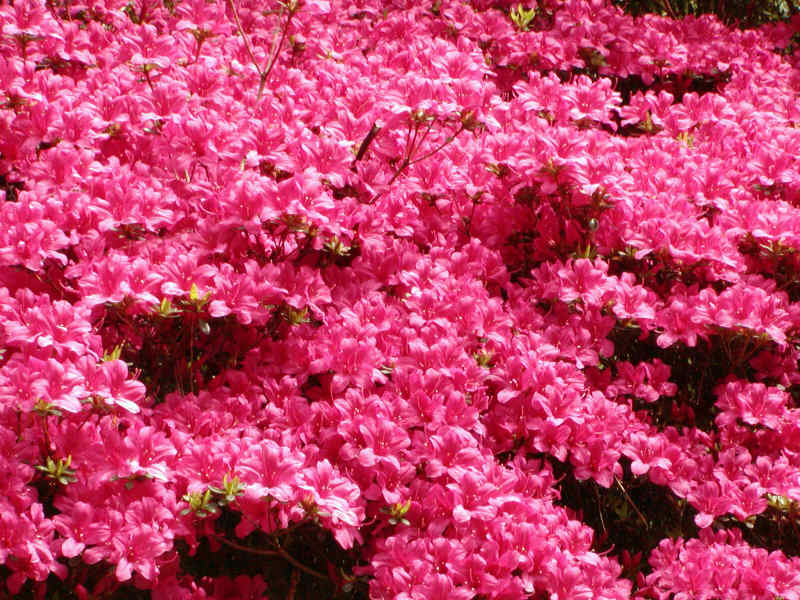
Rhododendron hedge
