= Bareppa =

Hamlet in Cornwall, England

Coordinates: 50.126°N 05.105°W

- Location within Cornwall
- OS grid reference: SW781297
- Shire county: Cornwall
- Region: South West
- Country: England
- Sovereign state: United Kingdom
- Police: Devon and Cornwall
- Fire: Cornwall
- Ambulance: South Western

Bareppa is a hamlet in west Cornwall, England, United Kingdom, three miles (5 km) southwest of Falmouth. It is in the civil parish of Mawnan.
