= Durgan =

Hamlet in Cornwall, England

Coordinates: 50.104°N 5.114°W

Durgan: Cornish: Dowrgeun
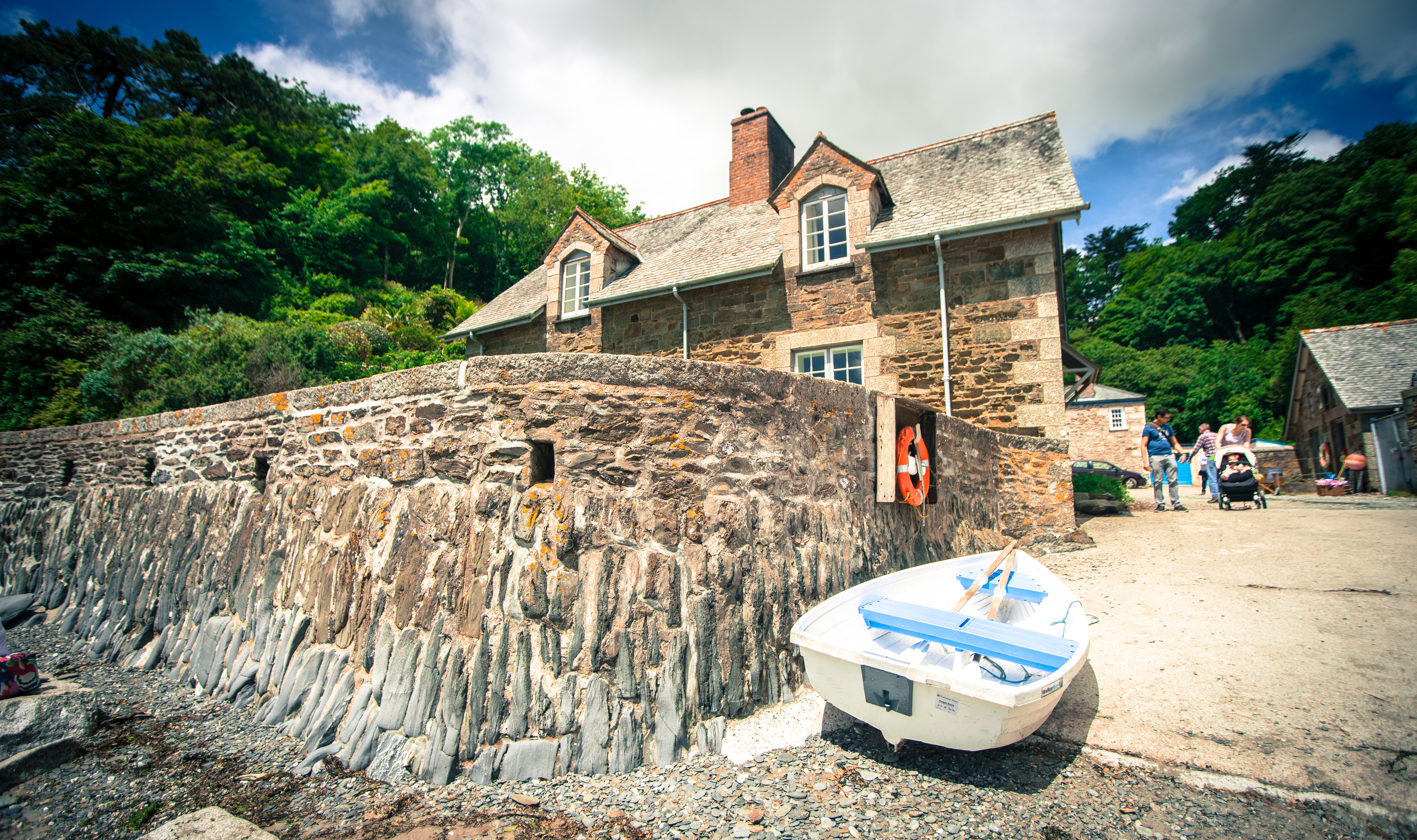
- Civil parish: Mawnan
- Shire county: Cornwall
- Region: South West
- Country: England
- Sovereign state: United Kingdom
- Post town: Falmouth
- Postcode district: TR11 5
- Police: Devon and Cornwall
- Fire: Cornwall
- Ambulance: South Western

Durgan (Cornish: Dowrgeun, lit. 'otters') is a hamlet in the parish of Mawnan, south Cornwall, England, United Kingdom. It is beside the Helford River four miles (6 km) south of Falmouth. The hamlet consists of fifteen residential properties, seven owned by the National Trust, and has a permanent population of just 9 (2024). The majority of the properties are second homes or holiday lets. Durgan has a beach popular with boaters, swimmers and holiday makers. Only vehicles belonging to residents or those staying in holiday lets are permitted in the village as the roads are narrow and parking is unavailable.

Durgan is known for boating on the Helford River and the Fal estuary and hosts a regatta on the last Sunday in August each year. It was the home port of Captain George Vancouver.

Glendurgan Garden, a National Trust property, is located in Durgan.

== Views of Durgan ==
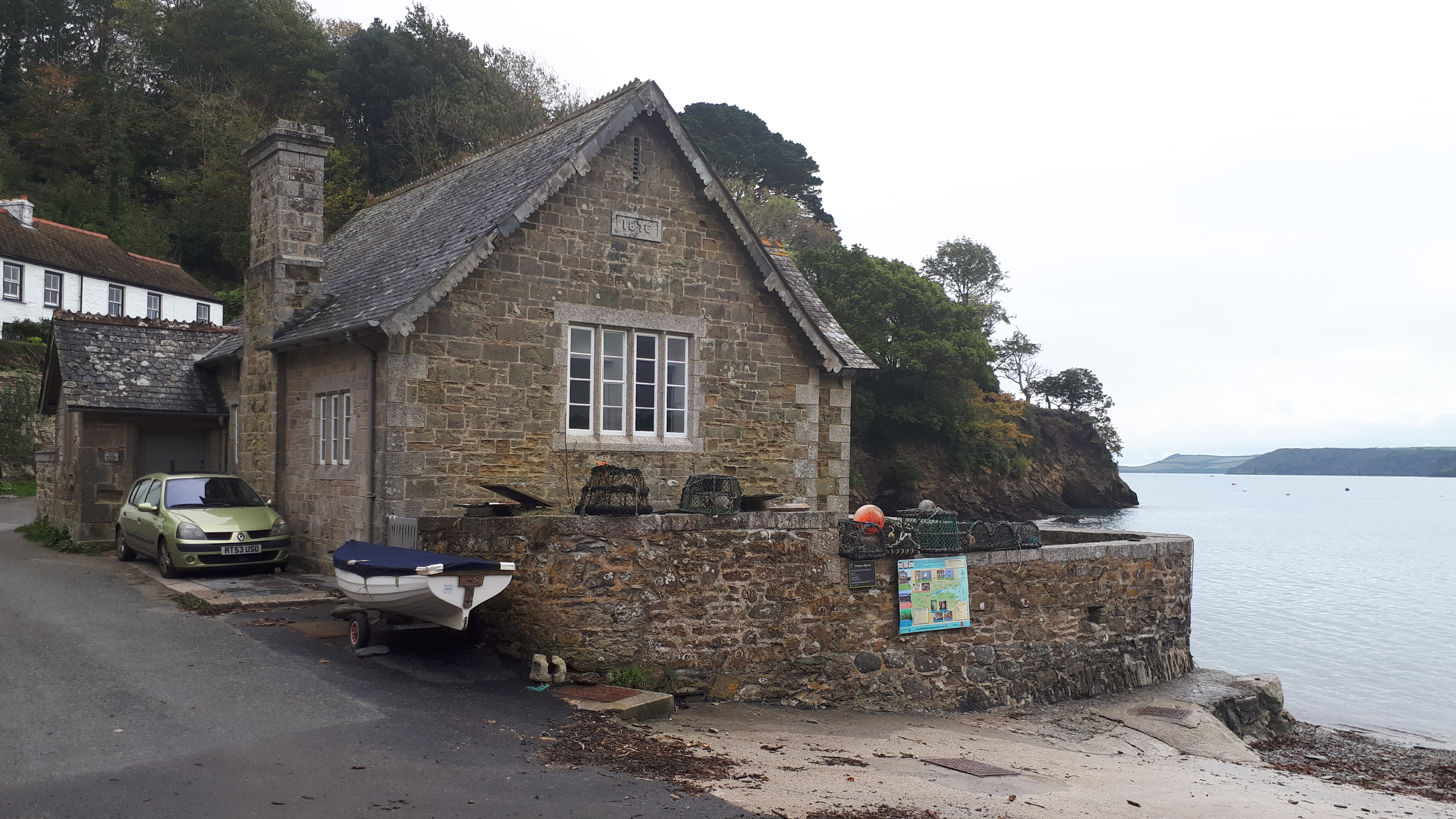
Durgan Old School House (National Trust holiday let)

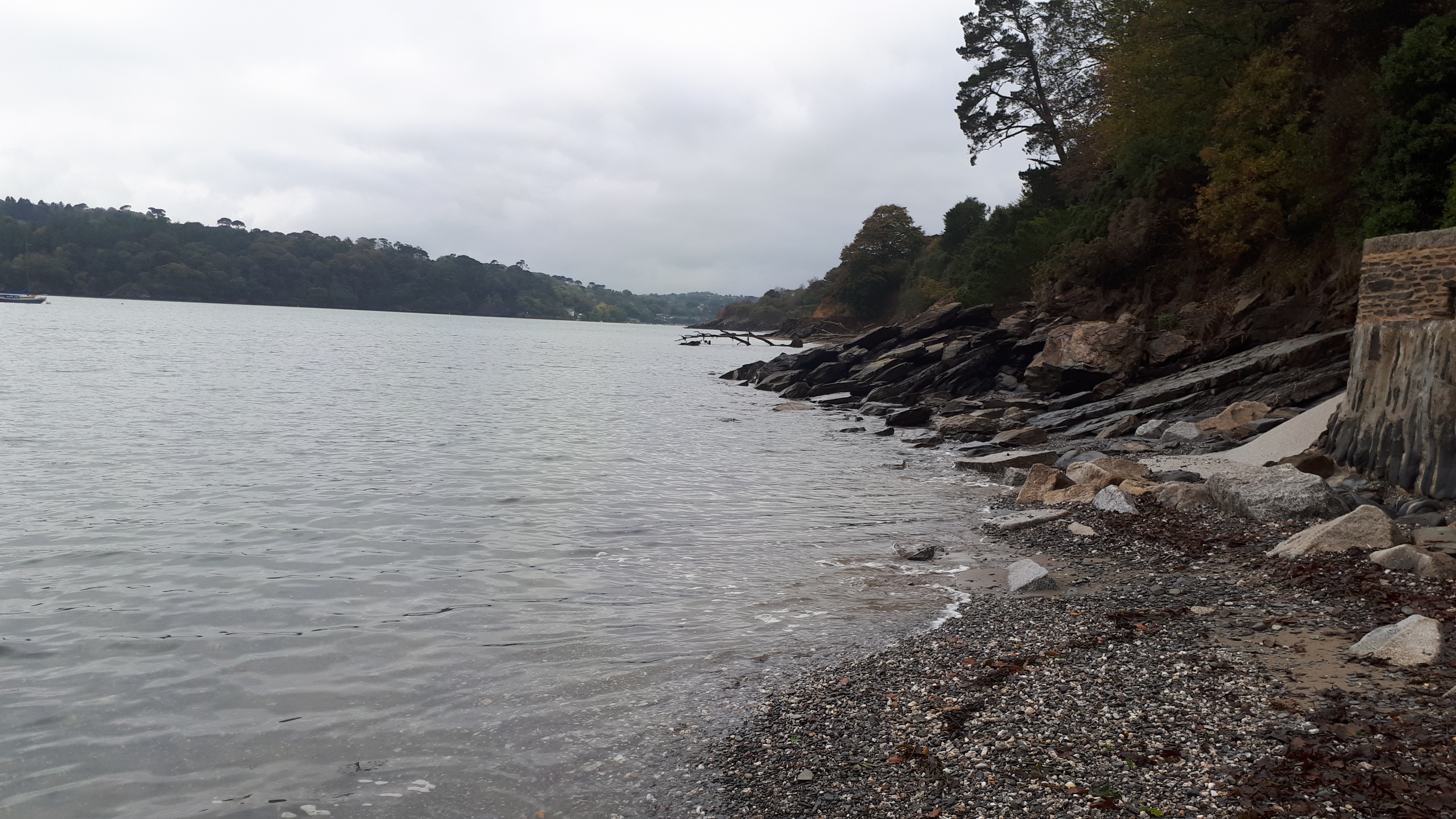
Durgan beach and Helford river

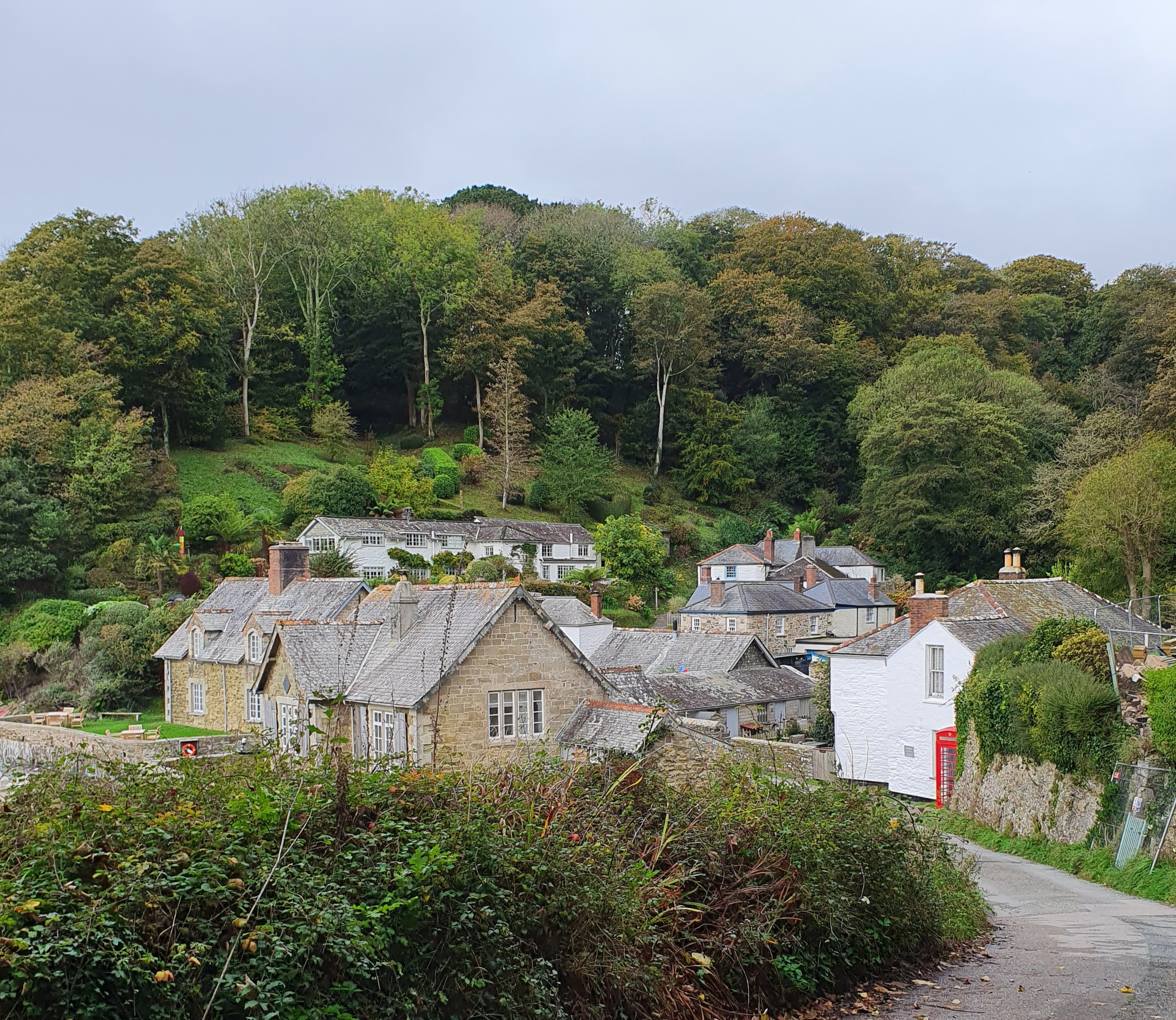
Durgan from the east
