= St Mawnan and St Stephen's Church, Mawnan =

Church in Cornwall, England

St Mawnan and St Stephen’s Church, Mawnan
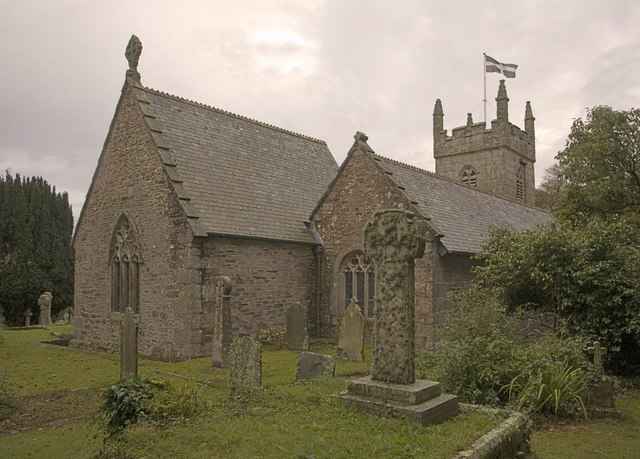
- St Mawnan and St Stephen’s Church, Mawnan
- St Mawnan and St Stephen’s Church, Mawnan
- 50°06′12.85″N 5°05′45.82″W
- Location: Mawnan
- Country: England
- Denomination: Church of England

History
- Dedication: St Mawnan and St Stephen

Administration
- Province: Province of Canterbury
- Diocese: Diocese of Truro
- Archdeaconry: Cornwall
- Deanery: Carnmarth South
- Parish: Mawnan

Listed Building – Grade II*
- Official name: Church of Saint Mawnan
- Designated: 10 July 1957
- Reference no.: 1161760

St Mawnan and St Stephen's Church, Mawnan is a Grade II* listed parish church in the Church of England Diocese of Truro in Mawnan, Cornwall, England, UK.

== History ==
The church dates from the 13th century with the tower dating from the 14th and 15th centuries. It was restored in 1827 when the north wall was rebuilt. The chancel roof was restored by the vicar in 1861 and a further restoration took place in 1879 to 1880 under the direction of the architect James Piers St Aubyn. It was by then in a ruinous state and no longer possible to worship within. In the 1880 restoration considerable portions of the north and south walls were rebuilt, and several new windows were inserted. The chancel and east window of the north aisle were filled with stained glass, and in the north-east corner a new window of coloured glass was inserted in memory of M. Nowell Peters who died in 1880. The contractor for the restoration was Messrs May of Pool, and it cost £1,500. The church reopened on 30 June 1880.

The patron saint is Mawan, Mawnan or Mawganus, a Breton monk who arrived in the area in the 520AD.

There is a fragment of a cross head built into the north aisle wall; it was found in the churchyard in 1881.

== Rectors of Mawnan ==
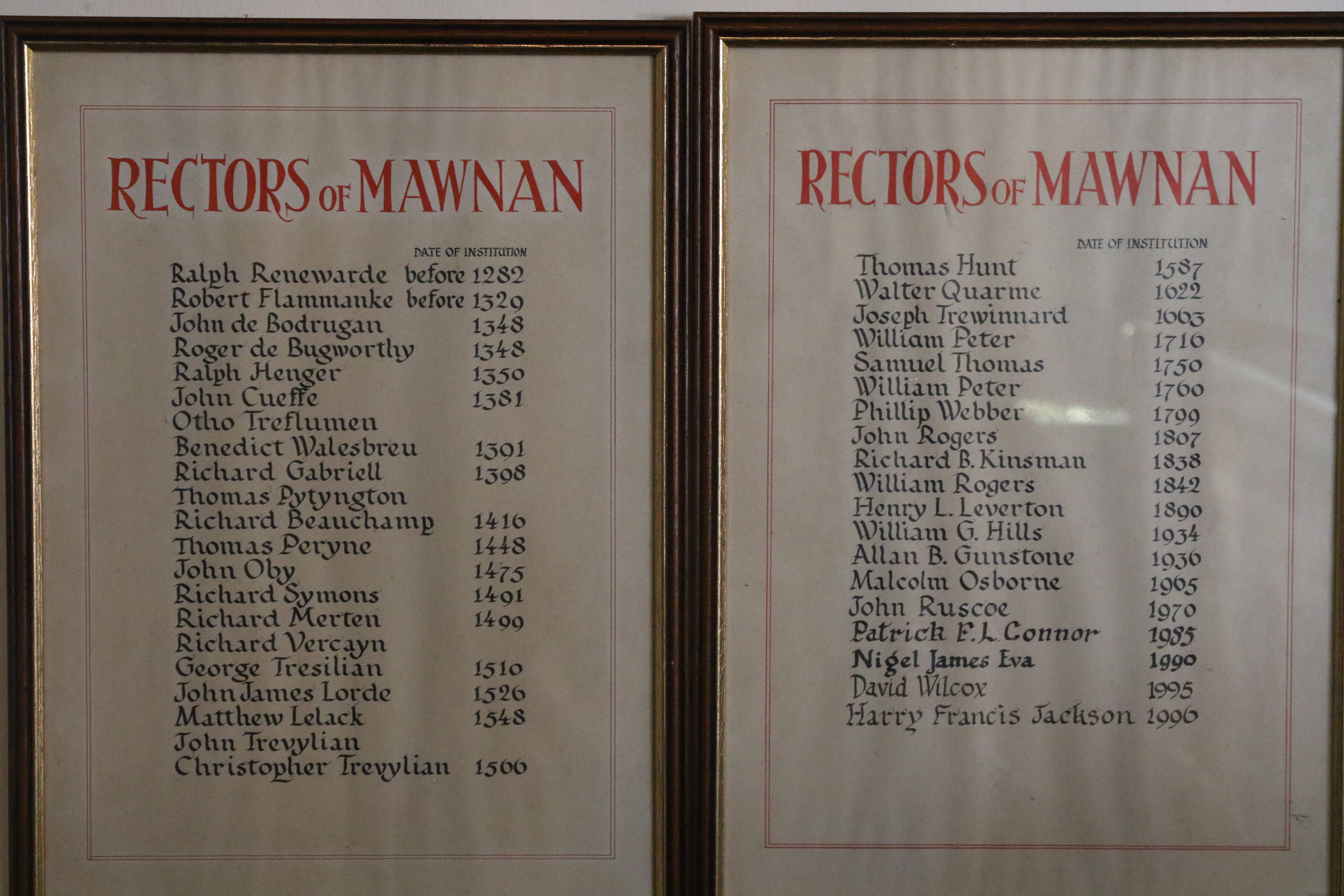
List of rectors

- Ralph Renewarde before 1282
- Robert Flammanke before 1329
- John de Bodrugan 1348
- Roger de Bugworthy 1348
- Ralph Heuger 1350
- John Cueffe 1381
- Otho Treflumen
- Benedict Walesbreu 1391
- Richard Gabriell 1398
- Thomas Pytyngton
- Richard Beauchamp 1416
- Thomas Peryne 1448
- John Oby 1475
- Richard Symons 1491
- Richard Merten 1499
- Richard Vercayn
- George Tresilian 1510
- John James Lorde or Lowd 1526
- Matthew Lelack or Selack 1549
- John Trevylian
- Christopher Trevylian 1566
- Thomas Hunt 1587
- Walter Quarm 1622
- Joseph Trewinnard 1663
- William Peter 1716
- Samuel Thomas 1750
- William Peter 1760
- Phillip Webber 1799
- John Rogers 1807
- Richard B. Kinsman 1838
- William Rogers 1842
- Henry Lewis Leverton 1890
- William G. Hills 1934
- Allan B. Gunstone 1936
- Malcolm Osborne 1965
- John Ruscoe 1970
- Patrick F. L. Connor 1985
- Nigel James Eva 1990
- David Wilcox 1995
- Harry Francis Jackson 1996

== Parish status ==
The church is in a joint parish with:

- St Michael's Church, Mawnan Smith

== Organ ==
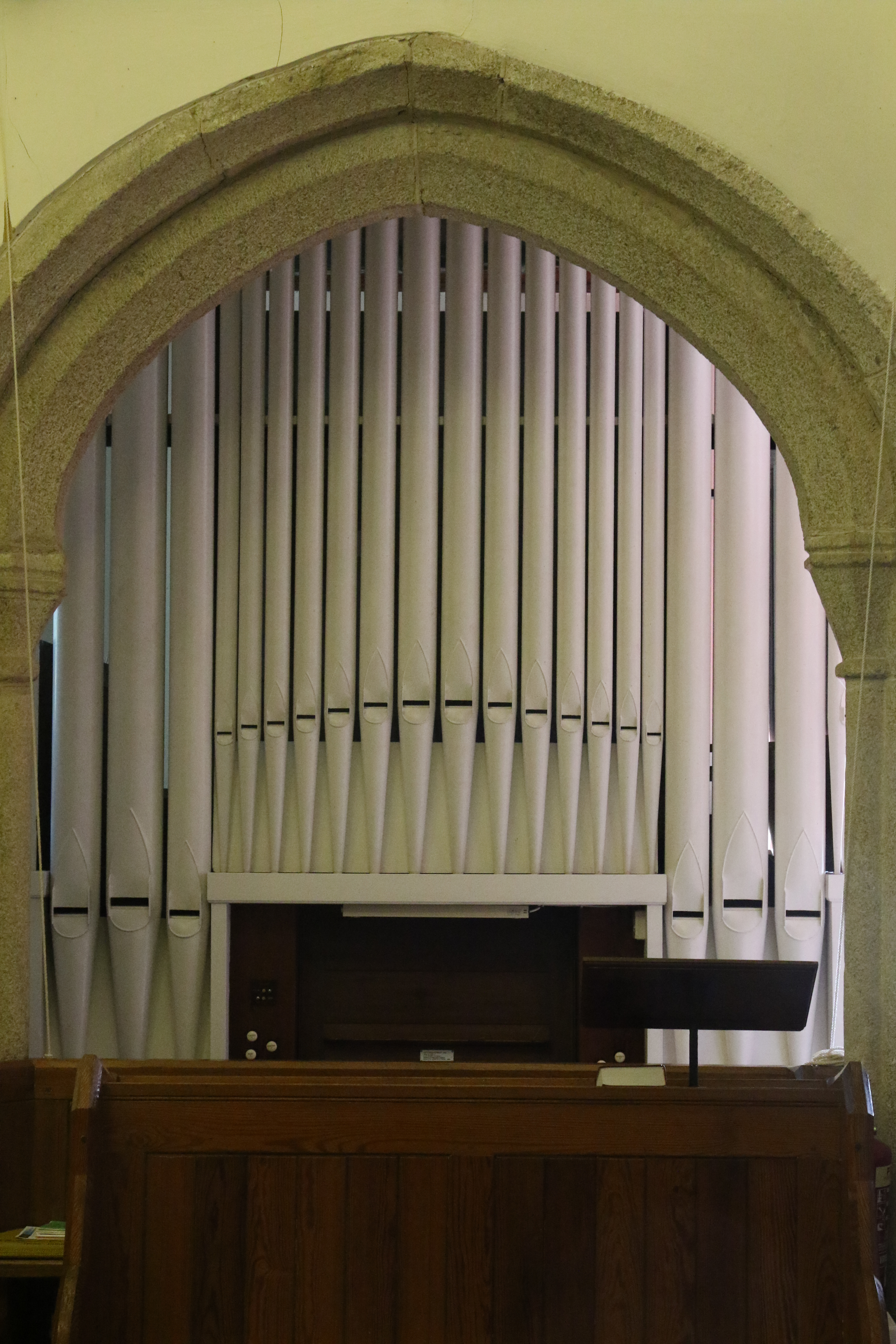
The organ

The church had an organ by J. W. Walker & Sons Ltd dating from 1875 which was originally in All Saints’ Church, Marazion. It has subsequently been enlarged by Hele & Co and Lance Foy. A specification of the organ can be found on the National Pipe Organ Register.
