= John Rogers (divine) =

English Anglican priest, mine-owner, botanist, mineralogist and scholar

The Reverend John Rogers
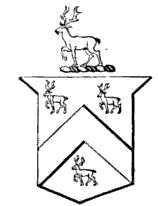
- The arms of the Rogers family of Penrose
- Born: 17 July 1778; Plymouth
- Died: 12 June 1856 (aged 77); Penrose
- Education: Helston grammar school, Eton College, and Trinity College, Oxford
- Occupation: Clergyman
- Spouse(s): Mary and Grace
- Children: Five sons and a daughter
- Parent(s): Margaret and John Rogers

John Rogers (17 July 1778 – 12 June 1856) was an English Anglican priest, mine-owner, botanist, mineralogist, and scholar of Hebrew and Syriac.

== Life ==
He was born at Plymouth on 17 July 1778, the eldest son of John Rogers, the MP for Penryn and Helston and Margaret, daughter of Francis Basset.

Rogers was educated at Helston grammar school, at Eton College, and at Trinity College, Oxford. He matriculated on 8 April 1797, graduated B.A. as a passman in 1801, and M.A. in 1810. Having been ordained to the curacy of St Blazey, he became rector of St Mawnan and St Stephen's Church, Mawnan, the advowson of which belonged to his family, in 1807. In 1820 he was appointed Canon Residentiary of Exeter.

In February 1832 on the death of his father, he succeeded to the Penrose and Helston estates of about ten thousand acres (40 km^{2}), comprising the manors of Penrose, Helston, Carminow, Winnianton, and various other estates in Cornwall, including several mines. The Penrose lands had been acquired in 1770 by his grandfather, Hugh Rogers, and the Helston in 1798 by his father. Rogers resigned his rectory in 1838. He died at Penrose on 12 June 1856, and was buried at Sithney, where there is a monument to him.

== Marriage and children ==
Rogers married his first wife, Mary, on 14 June 1814, Mary. She was the only daughter of John Jope, rector of St Ives and vicar of St Cleer; and, secondly, in 1843, Grace, eldest daughter of G S Fursdon of Fursdon, Devonshire; she survived him, and died in 1862. By his first wife Rogers had issue five sons and a daughter.

1. John Jope Rogers (16 February 1816 – 24 April 1880), inherited the Penrose Estate and was elected M.P. for Helston from 1859 to 1865.
2. William (born 13 June 1817), succeeded his father as Rector of Mawnan.
3. Reginald (b 31 January 1819), inherited the Carwinion Estate and developed a fine garden there (now open to the public).
4. Saltren (b 8 April 1823)
5. Henry (b 24 December 1824)
6. Mary

== Landlord and scientist ==
Rogers was a popular and energetic landlord, and a good botanist and mineralogist. As lord of the Tresavean mine, he took an active part in forwarding the adoption of the first man engine in the UK (designed by Michael Loam), the introduction of which in the deep mines, in place of the old perpendicular ladders, proved an important reform – reducing the time for miners to reach the working levels from an hour to just twenty-five minutes, and enabling older, more experienced miners to reach the lowest levels. The installation cost was £2500, and it saved £125 per month in time and labour, as well as improving the safety of the mine. He contributed several papers to the Transactions of the Royal Geological Society of Cornwall.

== Hebrew and Syriac scholar ==
He was, however, chiefly distinguished as a Hebrew and Syriac scholar. In 1812, when Frey prepared the edition of the Hebrew Bible published by the newly formed Society for Promoting the Conversion of the Jews, the general supervision of the work was entrusted to Rogers.

== Published works ==
His own works, in addition to sermons and occasional papers, were:

- What is the Use of the Prayer Book? London, 1819.
- Scripture Proofs of the Catechism, London, 1832.
- Remarks on Bishop Lowth's Principles in correcting the Text of the Hebrew Bible, Oxford, 1832.
- The Book of Psalms in Hebrew, with Selections from various Readings and from the ancient Versions, Oxford and London, 1833–4.
- On the Origin and Regulations of Queen Anne's Bounty, London, 1836.
- Reasons why a new Edition of the Peschito Version should be published, Oxford and London, 1849.

A few days before his death he completed his last article on ‘Variæ Lectiones of the Hebrew Bible’ for the Journal of Sacred Literature.
