= Helford, Cornwall =

Village in Cornwall, England

Coordinates: 50.091°N 5.137°W

Helford: Cornish: Heyl
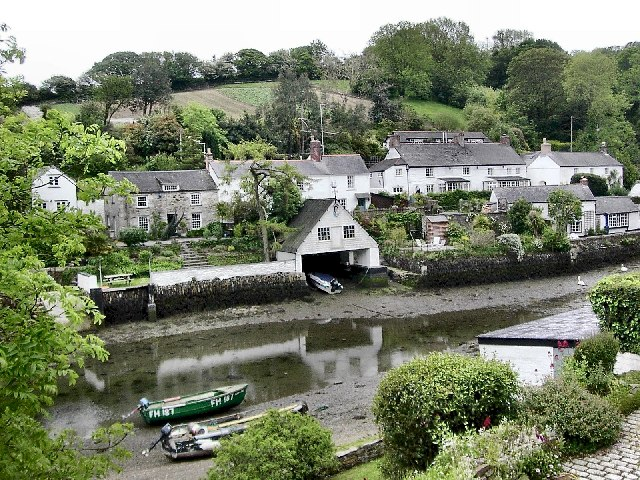
- Helford riverside

- Location within Cornwall
- Unitary authority: Cornwall
- Region: South West
- Country: England
- Sovereign state: United Kingdom
- Post town: Helston
- Postcode district: TR12
- Police: Devon and Cornwall
- Fire: Cornwall
- Ambulance: South Western

Burgee of Helford River Sailing Club, established in 1948

Helford (Cornish: Heyl, meaning estuary) is a village in the civil parish of Manaccan. It is on the south bank of the Helford River in west Cornwall, England, United Kingdom, approximately five miles (8 km) south-southwest of Falmouth and lies within the Cornwall Area of Outstanding Natural Beauty (AONB). The village was rated as among the "20 most beautiful villages in the UK and Ireland" by Condé Nast Traveler in 2020. The village has a pub, a village shop, and a sailing club. A pedestrian ferry operates daily from Easter to October between Helford and Helford Passage.
