= Mawnan Smith =

Village in Cornwall, England

Coordinates: 50.11666°N 5.11090°W

Mawnan Smith: Cornish: Govel Vaunan
- Location within Cornwall
- Area: 0.5275 km^{2} (0.2037 sq mi)
- Population: 1,020 (2019 estimate)
  - Density: 1,934/km^{2} (5,010/sq mi)
- OS grid reference: SW777287
- Civil parish: Mawnan
- Unitary authority: Cornwall
- Ceremonial county: Cornwall
- Region: South West
- Country: England
- Sovereign state: United Kingdom
- Post town: FALMOUTH
- Postcode district: TR11
- Dialling code: 01326
- Police: Devon and Cornwall
- Fire: Cornwall
- Ambulance: South Western
- UK Parliament: Falmouth and Camborne

Mawnan Smith (Cornish: Govel Vaunan) is a village in the civil parish of Mawnan in south Cornwall, England, United Kingdom. It is situated approximately three miles south of Falmouth. In 2019 it had an estimated population of 1020.

The parish church of St Mawnan and St Stephen is in Mawnan village (also known as Mawnan Church). A second church, St Michael's, was built in the village of Mawnan Smith in 1876 and there was also a Wesleyan Methodist chapel in the village.

The village name may derive from the fact that it once had four working smithies serving the many farms in the parish. By the early 20th century only one remained in business. It was operated by blacksmith Billy James followed by his son Dryden and closed when the latter died in 1994. The Mawnan Anvil Trust has since restored the smithy as a working forge with a resident artist blacksmith and the site now also includes a silversmith, sign writer and carpenter.

== Owlman ==
Mawnan Smith is also home to a number of sightings of the British cryptid, the Owlman.
