= Helford River =

Ria in Cornwall, England

Coordinates: 50°06′N 5°06′W

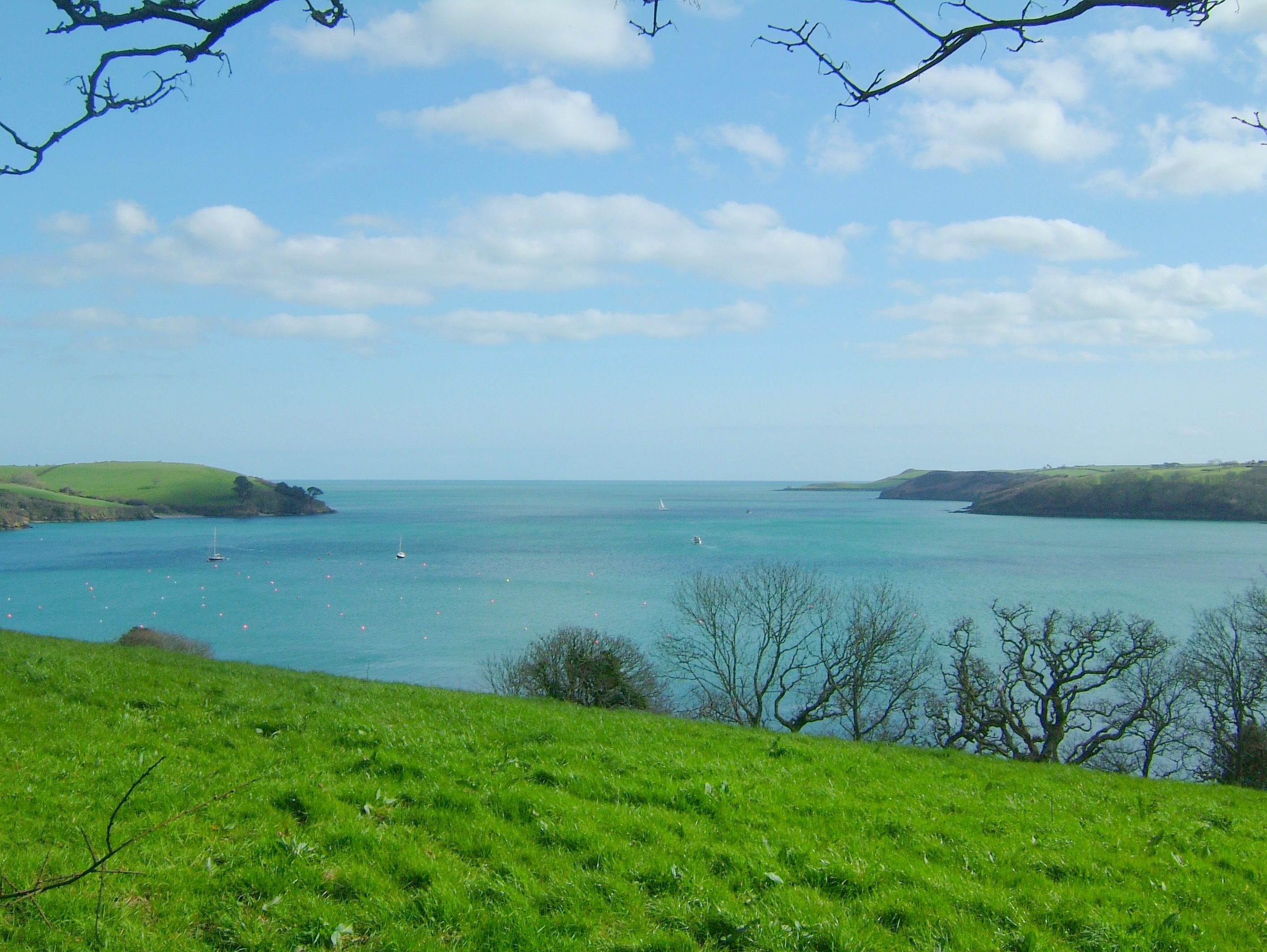
The Helford River from Trebah garden

The Helford River (Cornish: Dowr Mahonyer) is a ria (flooded river valley) in Cornwall, England, fed by small streams into its many creeks. There are seven creeks on the Helford; from west to east these are Ponsontuel Creek, Mawgan Creek, Polpenwith Creek, Polwheveral Creek, Frenchman's Creek, Port Navas Creek, and Gillan Creek. The best known of these is Frenchman's Creek, made famous by Daphne du Maurier in her novel of the same name. A little further up river is Tremayne Quay, built for a visit by Queen Victoria in the 1840s which she then declined to make, allegedly because it was raining.

== Toponymy ==
William Hals (died 1737) in his unpublished History of Cornwall referred to the estuary as ″Hayleford channel″ i.e.Hayle = estuary in Cornish and ford (English).

== Industry and tourism ==
The river has long been an important industrial and agricultural marine highway serving local mines, farms and quarries as well as the local fishing industry. In 1882, Merthen Hole was the highest point at which the colliers unloaded and Bishop's Quay was the base for a dozen pilchard boats. Most of this industry has now gone, although commercial fishermen still use the river to land their catch. This activity amounts to about 1 million pounds sterling a year, and the oyster fishery is being revived. The industries have largely been replaced by tourist activities, in particular those relating to the sea, although at the head of the river the landscape is dominated by the extensive operations of Gweek Boatyard and the base of marine drilling and construction company Fugro Seacore, although the latter has moved its main base to Falmouth. These businesses now dominate the head of the river where once coal and timber were landed. On the opposite bank is the Cornish Seal Sanctuary, where injured seals are nursed back to health before being released to the freedom of the Atlantic Ocean. The traditional 'heavy' industries have been replaced by 'lighter' businesses catering for the many tourists who visit the area.

=== Wildlife and conservation ===
The area falls into a Special Area of Conservation (Fal and Helford), Site of Special Scientific Interest (Lower Fal & Helford Intertidal) and the Cornwall Area of Outstanding Natural Beauty. The growth of eco and sustainable tourism have seen the development of tourism by Helford River Expeditions focusing on the natural surroundings. The National Trust play an important role with their strategy. Natural England (formerly English Nature) contributes by protecting and monitoring the area. The river is unique in that it is not wholly managed by a specific port or river authority, but brings together major environmental groups and organisations interested in the protection and development of the river. These introduce and recommend safeguards, such as those put forward by Helford River Marine Conservation Group.

In April 2022, seventy Field Crickets (Gryllus campestris) from Spain were introduced to an organic field near Helford. It was last recorded in Cornwall in 1906. A follow-up survey in July 2023 estimated a population of 1000.

== Villages, ferries and harbours ==
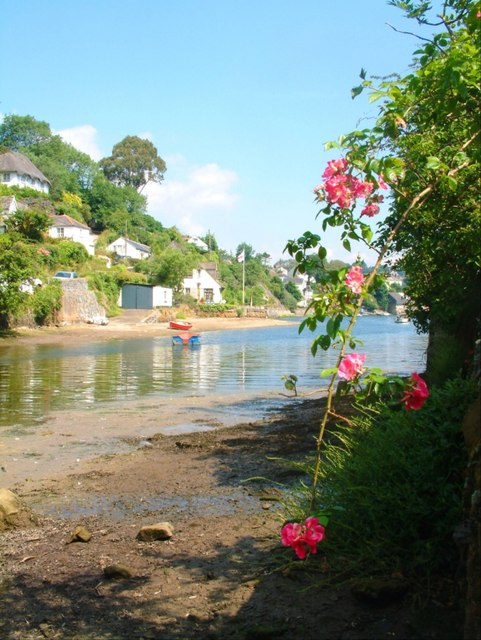
Whitewashed cottages on the bank of the Helford River

The main areas of settlement that adjoin the river are Gweek, Port Navas, Helford village, Helford Passage and Durgan. Gweek is larger than the others and has a larger permanent population, with more businesses, shops and a pub, The Gweek Inn. Helford village, on the south bank, has a shop/post office, Helford River Sailing Club and pub, The Shipwrights. Helford Passage, on the north bank, has a pub, The Ferryboat. Helford and Helford Passage are linked by a passenger (and pedal cycle) ferry which has existed for over 300 years.

Burgee of Helford River Sailing Club, established in 1948

Port Navas is home to the Duchy Oyster Farm and has at its focal point the Grade II listed Port Navas Quay. The quay, owned by the Duchy of Cornwall, has become degraded and damaged. A campaign group has been set up to protect and preserve Port Navas Quay and to reverse associated environmental damage in the Helford River Area; this is Preserve Port Navas Quay.

Following the death of Sir Richard Vyvyan, 8th Baronet of Trelowarren in 1879, his successor the 9th Baronet, Reverend, Sir Vyell Donnithorne Vyvyan exploited the woods on the estate. Aged oaks and ″firs″ between Gweek and Pont St Fual Lodges, and surplus wood from the rest of the estate was exported from Bishop's Quay (grid reference SV721225) to the colleries of south Wales and the principal towns of Cornwall.

== See also ==
- Atlantic Oakwood forest (Britain and Ireland)
