= Mabe =

Mabe may refer to:

== Places ==
- Mabë, Lezhë District, Albania
- Mabe, Nepal
- Mabe, Cornwall, United Kingdom
  - Mabe, Perranarworthal and St Gluvias (electoral division)
  - Constantine, Mabe and Mawnan (electoral division)
- Mabe Village, a fictional village in The Legend of Zelda: Link's Awakening

== People ==
- Mabe (surname), including a list of people with the name
- Mattias "Mäbe" Johansson, Swedish musician, member of Dissection

== Other uses ==
- Mabe (company), a Mexican appliance company

== See also ==
- MABES
- Maybe (disambiguation)
- Maybee (disambiguation)
- Mabee
- Mab (disambiguation)
