= Constantine, Mawnan and Budock (electoral division) =

Former electoral division of Cornwall in the UK

- Former ward Cornwall Council
- Boundary of Constantine, Mawnan and Budock in Cornwall from 2013-2021.
- County: Cornwall

2013–2021
- Number of councillors: One
- Replaced by: Constantine, Mabe and Mawnan; Falmouth Trescobeas and Budock
- Created from: Constantine
- Number of councillors: One

Constantine, Mawnan and Budock (Cornish: Lanngostentin, Maunan hag Eglosbudhek) was an electoral division of Cornwall in the United Kingdom which returned one member to sit on Cornwall Council between 2013 and 2021. It was abolished at the 2021 local elections, being succeeded by Constantine, Mabe and Mawnan and Falmouth Trescobeas and Budock.

== Councillors ==
Election	Member	Party
2013	Neil Hatton	Conservative
2015 by-election	John Bastin	Conservative
2017	John Bastin	Conservative
2021	Seat abolished	

== Extent ==
Constantine, Mawnan and Budock represented the villages of Seworgan, Brill, Constantine, Porth Navas, Helford Passage, Mawnan Smith, Budock Water, Treverva and Lamanva, and the hamlets of Brillwater, Durgan and Mawnan. The division covered 4,750 hectares in total.

== Election results ==
=== 2017 election ===
2017 election: Constantine, Mawnan and Budock
Party	Candidate	Votes	%	±%
Conservative	John Bastin	1,134	65.8	
Liberal Democrats	Graham Marsden	573	33.2	
Majority		561	32.5	
Rejected ballots		17	1.0	
Turnout		1724	44.8	
Conservative hold		Swing		

=== 2015 by-election ===
2015 by-election: Constantine, Mawnan and Budock
Party	Candidate	Votes	%	±%
Conservative	John Bastin	1,431	47.3	
Liberal Democrats	Rowland Abram	434	14.4	
UKIP	Chris Kinder	416	13.8	
Labour	Adam Crickett	384	12.7	
Mebyon Kernow	Charlotte Evans	340	11.2	
Majority		997	33.0	
Rejected ballots		19	0.6	
Turnout		3024	77.2	
Conservative hold		Swing		

=== 2013 election ===
2013 election: Constantine, Mawnan and Budock
Party	Candidate	Votes	%	±%
Conservative	Neil Hatton	856	57.1	
UKIP	Lomond Handley	434	28.9	
Labour	Susan Webber	203	13.5	
Majority		422	28.1	
Rejected ballots		7	0.5	
Turnout		1500	38.8	
Conservative win (new seat)				
