= Falmouth Boslowick (electoral division) =

Electoral division of Cornwall in the UK

- ward Cornwall Council
- Boundary of Falmouth Boslowick in Cornwall from 2021.
- County: Cornwall

Current ward
- Created: 2021
- Councillor: Alan Jewell (Conservative)
- Number of councillors: One
- Created from: Falmouth Boslowick

2013–2021
- Number of councillors: One
- Replaced by: Falmouth Boslowick
- Created from: Falmouth Boslowick

2009–2013
- Number of councillors: One
- Replaced by: Falmouth Boslowick
- Created from: Council created

Falmouth Boslowick (Cornish: Aberfala Boselewydh) is an electoral division of Cornwall in the United Kingdom and returns one member to sit on Cornwall Council. The current Councillor is Alan Jewell, a Conservative. The current division is distinct from those of the same name used from 2009 to 2013 and from 2013 to 2021, after boundary changes at the 2013 and 2021 local elections.

== Councillors ==
=== 2013-2021 ===
Election	Member	Party
2009	Mike Varney	Independent
2013	Alan Jewell	Conservative
2017	Alan Jewell	Conservative
2021	Seat abolished	

=== 2021-present ===
Election	Member	Party
2021	Alan Jewell	Conservative

== 2021-present division ==
=== Extent ===
The current division represents the south west of the town of Falmouth, including Boslowick, Swanvale and Maenporth Beach. The hamlet of Mongleath is shared with the Falmouth Trescobeas and Budock division.

=== Election results ===
==== 2021 election ====
2021 election: Falmouth Boslowick
Party	Candidate	Votes	%	±%
Conservative	Alan Jewell (Note: Incumbent councillor for the former division of Falmouth Boslowick)	693	39.9	
Labour	Sinead Hanks	578	33.3	
Green	Dean Evans	318	18.3	
Liberal Democrats	Richard Benton	132	7.6	
Majority		115	6.6	
Rejected ballots		15	0.9	
Turnout		1736	37.1	
Registered electors		4681		
Conservative win (new seat)				

== 2009-2021 divisions ==
Map of the 2013-2021 division shown within Cornwall (click to zoom in)

=== Extent ===
Falmouth Boslowick represented part of the town of Falmouth, including Boslowick and Maenporth. The division was nominally abolished during boundary changes at the 2013 election, but this had little effect on the ward. Both before and after boundary changes, the ward covered 283 hectares in total.

=== Election results ===
==== 2017 election ====
2017 election: Falmouth Boslowick
Party	Candidate	Votes	%	±%
Conservative	Alan Jewell	489	31.8	
Independent	Roger Bonney	339	22.0	
Labour	Nicholas Jemmett	302	19.6	
Liberal Democrats	Steve Eva	271	17.6	
Independent	Patricia Minson	79	5.1	
Mebyon Kernow	Jenny Booth	45	2.9	
Majority		150	9.8	
Rejected ballots		13	0.8	
Turnout		1538	40.0	
Conservative hold		Swing		

==== 2013 election ====
2013 election: Falmouth Boslowick
Party	Candidate	Votes	%	±%
Conservative	Alan Jewell	289	22.9	
Independent	Steve Eva	274	21.7	
Liberal Democrats	Roger Bonney	262	20.7	
UKIP	Mairi Hayworth	237	18.8	
Labour	Nicholas Jemmett	192	15.2	
Majority		15	1.2	
Rejected ballots		10	0.8	
Turnout		1264	33.8	
Conservative gain from Independent		Swing		

==== 2009 election ====
2009 election: Falmouth Boslowick
Party	Candidate	Votes	%	±%
Independent	Mike Varney	561	41.4	
Liberal Democrats	Roger Bonney	362	26.7	
Conservative	Gavin Andrewartha	339	25.0	
Labour	Stuart Venison	77	5.7	
Majority		199	14.7	
Rejected ballots		15	0.4	
Turnout		1354	38.7	
Independent win (new seat)				
