= Constantine, Mabe and Mawnan (electoral division) =

Electoral division of Cornwall in the UK

- ward Cornwall Council
- Boundary of Constantine, Mabe and Mawnan in Cornwall from 2021.
- County: Cornwall

Current ward
- Created: 2021
- Councillor: Anna Thomason-Kenyon (Reform UK)
- Number of councillors: One
- Created from: Constantine, Mawnan and Budock; Mabe, Perranarworthal and St Gluvias

Constantine, Mabe and Mawnan is an electoral division of Cornwall in the United Kingdom which returns one member to sit on Cornwall Council. It was created at the 2021 local elections, being created from the former divisions of Constantine, Mawnan and Budock, and Mabe, Perranarworthal and St Gluvias. The current councillor is Anna Thomason-Kenyon, who won the election as a member of Reform UK but has now changed party to the Cornish independent non aligned group.

== Boundaries ==
Constantine, Mabe and Mawnan represents the parish of Constantine, containing the villages of Brill, Constantine, Porth Navas, and Seworgan, the parish of Mabe, which includes the villages of Mabe Burnthouse and Trenoweth, and the parish of Mawnan, containing the village of Mawnan Smith and the hamlets of Bareppa, Carlidnack, Durgan, Helford Passage, Maenporth, and Penwarne. It is bordered to the north by the electoral divisions of Lanner, Stithians and Gwennap and Mylor, Perranarworthal and Ponsanooth, to the east by the English Channel and the divisions of Penryn and Falmouth Trescobeas and Budock, to the south and west by the division of Helston South and Meneage, and to the west by the division of Crowan, Sithney and Wendron.

== Councillors ==
| Election | Member | Party |
|---|---|---|
| 2021 | John Bastin | Conservative |
| 2025 | Anna Thomason-Kenyon | Reform UK |

== Election results ==
=== 2021 election ===
2021 election: Constantine, Mabe and Mawnan
| Party | Candidate | Votes | % | ±% |
|---|---|---|---|---|
| Conservative | John Bastin (Note: Incumbent councillor, formerly representing Constantine, Mawnan and Budock) | 953 | 47.5 | N/A |
| Labour | Daniel Edwards | 450 | 22.4 | N/A |
| Green | David Walker-Sünderhauf | 311 | 15.5 | N/A |
| Liberal Democrats | Graham Marsden | 291 | 14.5 | N/A |
| Majority | | 503 | 25.1 | N/A |
| Rejected ballots | | 16 | 0.8 | N/A |
| Turnout | | 2,021 | 45 | N/A |
| Conservative win (new seat) | | | | |

=== 2025 election ===
2025 election: Constantine, Mabe and Mawnan
| Party | Candidate | Votes | % | ±% |
|---|---|---|---|---|
| Reform | Anna Thomason-Kenyon | 422 | 23.4 | New |
| Conservative | Chris Painter | 409 | 22.7 | ▼24.8 |
| Labour | Jayne Ninnes | 292 | 16.2 | ▼6.2 |
| Independent | Keith West | 273 | 15.1 | New |
| Liberal Democrats | Linda Mary Williams | 263 | 14.6 | ▲0.1 |
| Mebyon Kernow | Mael Garrec | 140 | 7.8 | New |
| Majority | | 13 | 0.7 | ▼24.4 |
| Rejected ballots | | 4 | 0.2 | ▼0.6 |
| Turnout | | 1803 | 42.0 | ▼3.0 |
| Registered electors | | 4296 | | |
| Reform gain from Conservative | | | | |
