= Falmouth Trescobeas and Budock (electoral division) =

Electoral division of Cornwall in the UK

- ward Cornwall Council
- Boundary of Falmouth Trescobeas and Budock in Cornwall from 2021.
- County: Cornwall

Current ward
- Created: 2021
- Councillor: David Saunby (Independent)
- Number of councillors: One
- Created from: Constantine, Mawnan and Budock; Falmouth Trescobeas

Falmouth Trescobeas and Budock is an electoral division of Cornwall in the United Kingdom which returns one member to sit on Cornwall Council. It was created at the 2021 local elections, being created from the former divisions of Constantine, Mawnan and Budock, and Falmouth Trescobeas. The current councillor is David Saunby, an independent.

== Boundaries ==
Falmouth Trescobeas and Budock represents the northwest portion of the town of Falmouth, and all of the parish of Budock, containing the villages of Budock Water, Lamanva, Treverva, and Mongleath, which is shared with the Falmouth Boslowick electoral division.

== Councillors ==
Election	Member	Party
2021	David Saunby	Independent

== Election results ==
=== 2021 election ===
Falmouth Trescobeas and Budock
Party	Candidate	Votes	%	±%
Independent	David Saunby (Note: Incumbent councillor, formerly representing Falmouth Trescobeas)	634	32.8	N/A
Labour	Kirstie Edwards	620	32.1	N/A
Conservative	Phil Hart	504	26.1	N/A
Green	Matthew Valler	118	6.1	N/A
Liberal Democrats	Cara Hermit	54	2.8	N/A
Majority		14	0.7	N/A
Rejected ballots		8	0.4	N/A
Turnout		1,938		N/A
Independent win (new seat)				
