= Falmouth Trescobeas (electoral division) =

Former electoral division of Cornwall in the UK

- Former ward Cornwall Council
- Boundary of Falmouth Trescobeas in Cornwall from 2013-2021.
- County: Cornwall

2013–2021
- Number of councillors: One
- Replaced by: Falmouth Trescobeas and Budock
- Created from: Falmouth Trescobeas

2009–2013
- Number of councillors: One
- Replaced by: Falmouth Trescobeas
- Created from: Council created

Falmouth Trescobeas (Cornish: Aberfala Treskebeys) was an electoral division of Cornwall in the United Kingdom which returned one member to sit on Cornwall Council between 2013 and 2021. It was abolished at the 2021 local elections, being succeeded by Falmouth Trescobeas and Budock.

== Councillors ==
| Election | Member | Party |
|---|---|---|
| 2009 | David Saunby | Independent |
| 2013 | David Saunby | Independent |
| 2017 | David Saunby | Independent |
| 2021 | Seat abolished | |

== Extent ==
Falmouth Trescobeas represented the north west of the town of Falmouth, including Mongleath and Falmouth School. Although the division was nominally abolished in 2013, this had very little effect on the ward. Both before and after the boundary changes, the division covered 149 hectares in total.

== Election results ==
=== 2017 election ===
2017 election: Falmouth Trescobeas
| Party | Candidate | Votes | % | ±% |
|---|---|---|---|---|
| Independent | David Saunby | 623 | 50.0 | |
| Labour Co-op | Brod Ross | 255 | 20.5 | |
| Conservative | Frances Gwyn | 199 | 16.0 | |
| Liberal Democrats | Stephen Williams | 88 | 7.1 | |
| Green | Euan McPhee | 67 | 5.4 | |
| Majority | | 368 | 29.6 | |
| Rejected ballots | | 13 | 1.0 | |
| Turnout | | 1245 | 35.4 | |
| Independent hold | | Swing | | |

=== 2013 election ===
2013 election: Falmouth Trescobeas
| Party | Candidate | Votes | % | ±% |
|---|---|---|---|---|
| Independent | David Saunby | 462 | 37.7 | |
| Labour Co-op | Brod Ross | 285 | 23.3 | |
| UKIP | Carole Douglas | 154 | 12.6 | |
| Independent | Vicky Eva | 135 | 11.0 | |
| Conservative | Peter Williams | 94 | 7.7 | |
| Green | Euan McPhee | 43 | 3.5 | |
| Liberal Democrats | Rhun Davies | 30 | 2.4 | |
| Majority | | 177 | 14.4 | |
| Rejected ballots | | 22 | 1.8 | |
| Turnout | | 1225 | 33.2 | |
| Independent hold | | Swing | | |

=== 2009 election ===
2009 election: Falmouth Trescobeas
| Party | Candidate | Votes | % | ±% |
|---|---|---|---|---|
| Independent | David Saunby | 572 | 41.3 | |
| Independent | Vicky Eva | 303 | 21.9 | |
| Liberal Democrats | John Ault | 204 | 14.7 | |
| Conservative | Georgina Brown | 185 | 13.4 | |
| Labour | Lesley Trenchard | 107 | 7.7 | |
| Majority | | 269 | 19.4 | |
| Rejected ballots | | 14 | 1.0 | |
| Turnout | | 1385 | 38.7 | |
| Independent win (new seat) | | | | |
