= Mabee =

Mabee may refer to:

== People ==
Mabee is a surname. Notable people with the surname include:

- Carleton Mabee (1914–2014), American writer
- Christopher Mabee (born 1985), Canadian figure skater
- Gary Mabee (born 1955), British soccer player
- Grace W. Mabee (1872–1965), American composer, clubwoman
- James Pitt Mabee (1859–1912), Canadian lawyer, judge and railway commissioner
- John C. Mabee (1921–2002), American racehorse owner and breeder
- Ray Mabee (1901-1965), American politician

== Places ==
- Mabee House, a historic house in Schenectady County, New York, United States
- Mabee Arena, a sports venue at Kansas Wesleyan University, Salina, Kansas, United States
- Mabee Center, a multi-purpose arena at Oral Roberts University, Tulsa, Oklahoma, USA
- Mabee Corner, Ohio, USA; an unincorporated community

== Other uses ==
- John C. Mabee Stakes (Mabee Stakes), an August horserace in Del Mar, California, USA

== See also ==
- Mabee-Gerrer Museum of Art, Shawnee, Oklahoma, USA
- Maybee (disambiguation)
- Maybe (disambiguation)
- Mabe (disambiguation)
