= Mabe, Perranarworthal and St Gluvias (electoral division) =

Former electoral division of Cornwall in the UK

- Former ward Cornwall Council
- Boundary of Mabe, Perranarworthal and St Gluvias in from 2013-2021.
- County: Cornwall

2013–2021
- Number of councillors: One
- Replaced by: Mylor, Perranarworthal and Ponsanooth; Constantine, Mabe and Mawnan
- Created from: Mabe

Mabe, Perranarworthal and St Gluvias (Cornish: Lannvab, Peranarwodhel ha Pluw Luwyek) was an electoral division of Cornwall in the United Kingdom which returned one member to sit on Cornwall Council between 2013 and 2021. It was abolished at the 2021 local elections, being succeeded by Mylor, Perranarworthal and Ponsanooth and Constantine, Mabe and Mawnan.

== Councillors ==
Election	Member	Party
2013	Michael Keogh	UKIP
2014 by-election	Peter Williams	Conservative
2017	Peter Williams	Conservative
2021	Seat abolished	

== Extent ==
Mabe, Perranarworthal and St Gluvias represented the villages of Perranarworthal, Ponsanooth, St Gluvias and Mabe as well as the hamlets of Church Town, Trenoweth, Antron and Burnthouse. The division also covered part of Tremough, a university campus of the University of Exeter and Falmouth University. The division covered 2644 hectares in total.

== Election results ==
=== 2017 election ===
2017 election: Mabe, Perranarworthal and St Gluvias
Party	Candidate	Votes	%	±%
Conservative	Peter Williams	816	45.4	▲4.0
Liberal Democrats	Simon Taylor	473	26.3	▼15.0
Independent	Peter Tisdale	303	16.9	New
Labour	Cathy Page	199	11.1	▲0.2
Majority		343	19.1	▲19.0
Rejected ballots		5	0.3	▼0.2
Turnout		1796	41.5	▲19.0
Conservative hold		Swing		

=== 2014 by-election ===
2014 by-election: Mabe, Perranarworthal and St Gluvias
Party	Candidate	Votes	%	±%
Conservative	Peter Williams	406	41.4	▲13.1
Liberal Democrats	John Ault	405	41.3	▲18.5
Labour	Linda Hitchcox	107	10.9	▲2.0
Mebyon Kernow	Karen Sumser-Lupson	58	5.9	New
Majority		1	0.1	N/A
Rejected ballots		5	0.5	Steady
Turnout		981	22.5	▼17.4
Conservative gain from UKIP		Swing		

=== 2013 election ===
2013 election: Mabe, Perranarworthal and St Gluvias
Party	Candidate	Votes	%	±%
UKIP	Michael Keogh	413	28.5	
Conservative	Chris Ridgers	410	28.3	
Liberal Democrats	John Ault	331	22.8	
Independent	Christopher Jackson	160	11.0	
Labour	Betty Ross	129	8.9	
Majority		3	0.2	
Rejected ballots		7	0.5	
Turnout		1450	39.9	
UKIP win (new seat)				
