= Mabey =

Mabey may refer to:

- Mabey (surname)
- Mabey Group a British privately owned global engineering company
- Mabey Logistic Support Bridge, used by the military

== See also ==
- Maybe (disambiguation)
