= Camborne Pendarves (electoral division) =

Former electoral division of Cornwall in the UK

- Former ward Cornwall Council
- Boundary of Camborne Pendarves in Cornwall from 2013-2021.
- County: Cornwall

2013–2021
- Number of councillors: One
- Replaced by: Camborne Trelowarren; Camborne West and Treswithian
- Created from: Camborne South

Camborne Pendarves was an electoral division of Cornwall in the United Kingdom which returned one member to sit on Cornwall Council between 2013 and 2021. It was abolished at the 2021 local elections, being succeeded by Camborne Trelowarren and Camborne West and Treswithian.

== Councillors ==
Election	Member	Party
2013	Harry Blakeley	UKIP
2015 by-election	John Herd	Conservative
2017	John Herd	Conservative
2021	Seat abolished	

== Extent ==
Camborne Pendarves represented the south of Camborne and the villages of Barripper and Penponds, covering 377 hectares in total.

== Election results ==
=== 2017 election ===
2017 election: Camborne Pendarves
Party	Candidate	Votes	%	±%
Conservative	John Herd	705	59.8	
Liberal Democrats	Tom Simmons	266	22.6	
Mebyon Kernow	John Gillingham	202	17.1	
Majority		439	37.2	
Rejected ballots		6	0.5	
Turnout		1179	36.9	
Conservative hold		Swing		

=== 2015 by-election ===
2015 by-election: Camborne Pendarves
Party	Candidate	Votes	%	±%
Conservative	John Herd	325	30.2	
Liberal Democrats	Nathan Billings	311	28.9	
Labour	Val Dalley	220	20.4	
UKIP	Michael Pascoe	89	8.3	
Mebyon Kernow	Deborah Fox	85	7.9	
Green	Jacqueline Merrick	31	2.9	
Independent	Peter Channon	13	1.2	
Majority		14	1.3	
Rejected ballots		2	0.2	
Turnout		1076	32.9	
Conservative gain from UKIP		Swing		

=== 2013 election ===
2013 election: Camborne Pendarves
Party	Candidate	Votes	%	±%
UKIP	Harry Blakeley	340	31.7	
Conservative	David Atherfold	319	29.7	
Mebyon Kernow	John Gillingham	211	19.6	
Labour	Trevor Chalker	200	18.6	
Majority		21	2.0	
Rejected ballots		4	0.4	
Turnout		1074	32.2	
UKIP win (new seat)				
