= Ben Asdale =

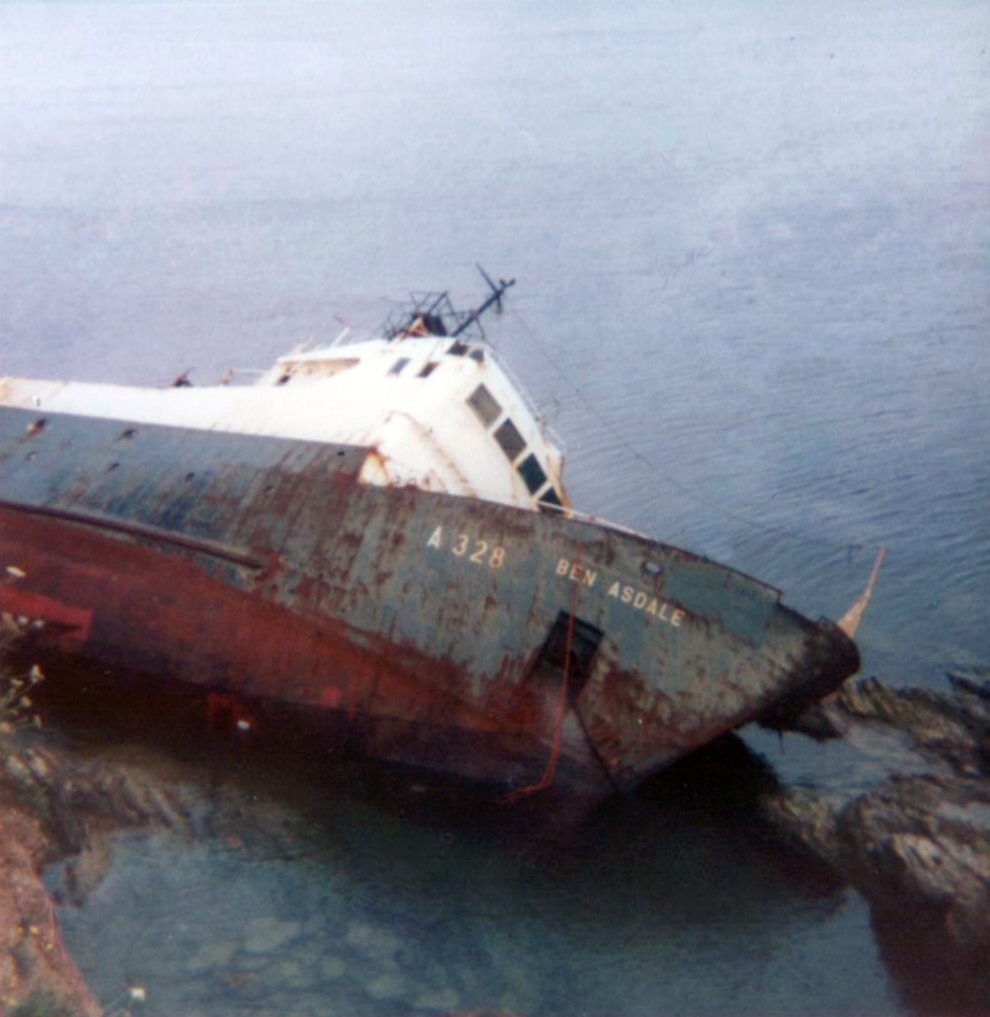
- The trawler Ben Asdale, aground in Cornwall, some time in the 1970s.

History

United Kingdom
- Name: Ben Asdale
- Builder: A & C de la Manche, Dieppe
- Launched: 8 September 1972
- Identification: IMO number: 7227152
- Fate: Wrecked on 30 December 1978

General characteristics
- Class & type: freezer trawler
- Tonnage: 422 GRT
- Length: 143 ft (43.6 m)
- Beam: 31 ft 6 in (9.6 m)
- Depth: 13 ft 6 in (4.11 m)
- Notes: Fishing number: A328; Record number: 3577

Ben Asdale was a Scottish trawler that was wrecked in December 1978 near Falmouth, Cornwall.

On the evening of 30 December 1978, the freezer trawler Ben Asdale was off-loading fish into the hold of the Russian factory ship Antarktika (Антарктика), which was anchored in Falmouth Bay. A force eight gale was blowing and heavy snow was falling. When the Ben Asdale had finished discharging her cargo of mackerel, she cast off her stern rope in preparation to move away from the anchored Antarktika. The rope fouled her rudder and she would not respond to her helm. The skipper, Albert "Barty" Coe from North Shields - latterly Chief Fishery Officer at Northumberland Sea Fisheries Committee until his retirement on grounds of "ill health" - tried to get the Russians to re-secure the stern of his vessel, but by now the fierce gale was dragging both boats. The Russians sent over two officers to assist in getting the steering working. Shortly afterwards, the bow rope parted and the Ben Asdale was adrift.

The skipper let go an anchor but it failed to hold, and as they were swept towards Maenporth beach, a Mayday was sent. With the wind now gusting force ten and the waves breaking over the trawler, she was out of control, and soon piled onto the rocks at the bottom of Newporth Head. As the boat struck the rocks, one of the crew jumped over the side, gravely injuring himself, and others threw out anything to act as life rafts.

By now, word of the trawler's troubles had spread, and the three Billcliffe brothers, who owned the Crag Hotel by the beach, rushed to the scene and waded into the surf and during that night dragged three of the crew to safety. Up on Newporth head, the Coastguard had arrived and was setting up a breeches buoy. With visibility almost at zero due to the blizzard, searchlights were rigged. As the breeches buoy was connected to the stricken trawler, she lurched and rolled onto her side, jamming all the gear. By now the rescue helicopter had arrived from RNAS Culdrose (HMS Seahawk) but could not see what was going on down on the hulk of the trawler because of the swirling blizzard.

The Coastguard set up a radio link with the pilot, to guide the helicopter, which had to fly backwards over the wreck because of the winds and the nearness of the Headland. Over a period of about one and a half hours the helicopter lowered its winch eight times and successfully lifted off eight crewmen. Whilst all this was happening, three of the crew despaired and tried to swim to a shore that looked temptingly near. In the end eleven people were saved, but in spite of all the efforts of the emergency services and the Billicliffe brothers, three men (two Britons and a Russian) were drowned, their bodies washed up the next day on Maenporth Beach. The crew of the helicopter were awarded two Air Force Crosses and three Queen's Commendations for one of the most dangerous rescues of modern times.
