= Mabe (surname) =

Mabe is a surname. Notable people with the surname include:

- Bob Mabe (1929–2005), American baseball player
- Manabu Mabe (1924–1997), Japanese-Brazilian painter
- Tom Mabe, American comedian
