= Mabey (surname) =

Mabey is a surname. Notable people with the surname include:

- Bevil Mabey (1916–2010), English businessman and inventor
- Claire Mabey, New Zealand writer
- Charles R. Mabey (1877–1959), American politician
- Paul Mabey (c. 1786–1863), merchant and political figure in Prince Edward Island
- Reginald W. Mabey (1932–2000), Canadian politician
- Richard Mabey (born 1941), British naturalist and author
