= John Ault =

English Liberal Democrat politician

John Ault FRSA FRGS is a former Liberal Democrat politician in England. He is now an academic, election observer, and writer.

== Personal life ==
Ault studied for an Open degree at the Open University and subsequently received his PhD from the University of Exeter in 2014.

== Political career ==
Ault entered local politics in 1992 being elected to the Appleton Parish Council at the age of 21. He contested the Wyre parliamentary constituency in the same year and South Lancashire European Parliamentary constituency in 1994 – where the future leader of the Liberal Democrats, Tim Farron, acted as Ault's election agent. Having moved to Cornwall to become election agent to future Liberal Democrat MP, Colin Breed, he contested Calstock in the 1997 Cornwall County Council Elections. Working for the Liberal Democrats he was agent for the Eddisbury, Wigan, Preston and Ogmore by-elections between 1999 and 2002 and contested the Methyr Tydil and Rhymney Welsh Assembly Seat in 2003. Having returned to Cornwall in 2003 he won the Rame division of Cornwall County Council, defeating the future Member of Parliament for South East Cornwall, Sheryll Murray in 2005.

Following the UK referendum on the Alternative Vote in 2011 Ault was Chair of the Electoral Reform Society from 2011 to 2012.

In 2009, Ault stood in the Cornwall Council election for the Falmouth Trescobeas division, coming in third place. In the 2013 elections, he contested the Mabe, Perranarworthal and St Gluvias division, again coming third. Ault stood again for the Mabe, Perranarworthal and St Gluvias seat in a by-election in 2014. He failed to win the seat by just 1 vote.

Ault also appeared on BBC's Top Gear where he won 'The Fastest Political Party' in Season 2 of the show in 2003.

== Election observation ==
Ault is also involved in international and UK election observation in his role as director of Democracy Volunteers. He has observed elections in the United States, Kazakhstan and Canada, as well as UK elections and referendums.

== Academic career ==
In 2008, Ault became a member of staff at the University of Exeter (Penryn) where he now lectures politics as an Associate Research Fellow, and is director of the Cornish Audio-Visual Archive (CAVA).

== Publications ==
=== Books ===
Liberal Democrats in Cornwall – Culture, Character or Campaigns?, Amazon 2015 ISBN 978-1511428941

By-elections: Essays of the Nations (Nationalist Expression), Amazon 2015 ISBN 978-1514773512

Thirty Days in February, Amazon 2016 ISBN 978-1511503693

=== Academic articles ===
The Inter-War Cornish By-Elections: Microcosm of 'Rebellion'? in Cornish Studies, Volume 20, Number 1, 1 May 2012, pp. 241–259(19)(ed. Philip Payton) ISBN 978-0859898867

The other Rathbone: Beatrice, the trans-Atlantic envoy, Issue 71 Women's History Magazine, Spring 2013
