= Boslowick =

Coordinates: 50.1437°N 5.0889°W

- Location within Cornwall
- OS grid reference: SW7931
- Shire county: Cornwall
- Region: South West
- Country: England
- Sovereign state: United Kingdom
- Police: Devon and Cornwall
- Fire: Cornwall
- Ambulance: South Western
- UK Parliament: Truro and Falmouth

Boslowick is a suburb on the western edge of Falmouth within Cornwall, England, United Kingdom.

Boslowick may derive its name from the house of that name, which was later converted into a pub until its closure in 2021.

Following failed attempts to gain permission to demolish the building the building burned down on the 11th November 2025.
