= Treverva =

Village in Cornwall, England

Coordinates: 50°08′N 5°08′W

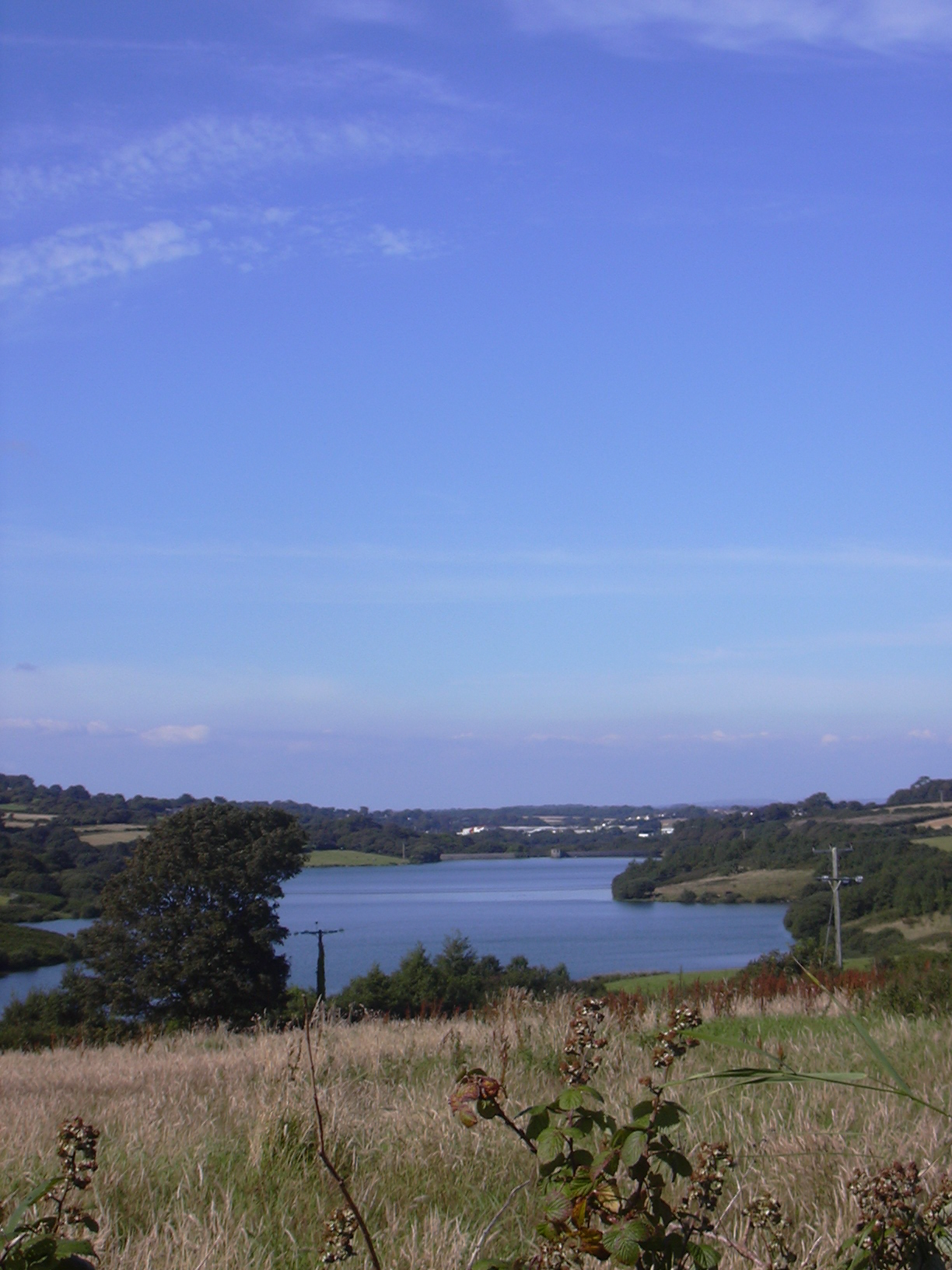
Argal Reservoir (the boundary between the parishes of Budock and Mabe runs through the reservoir)

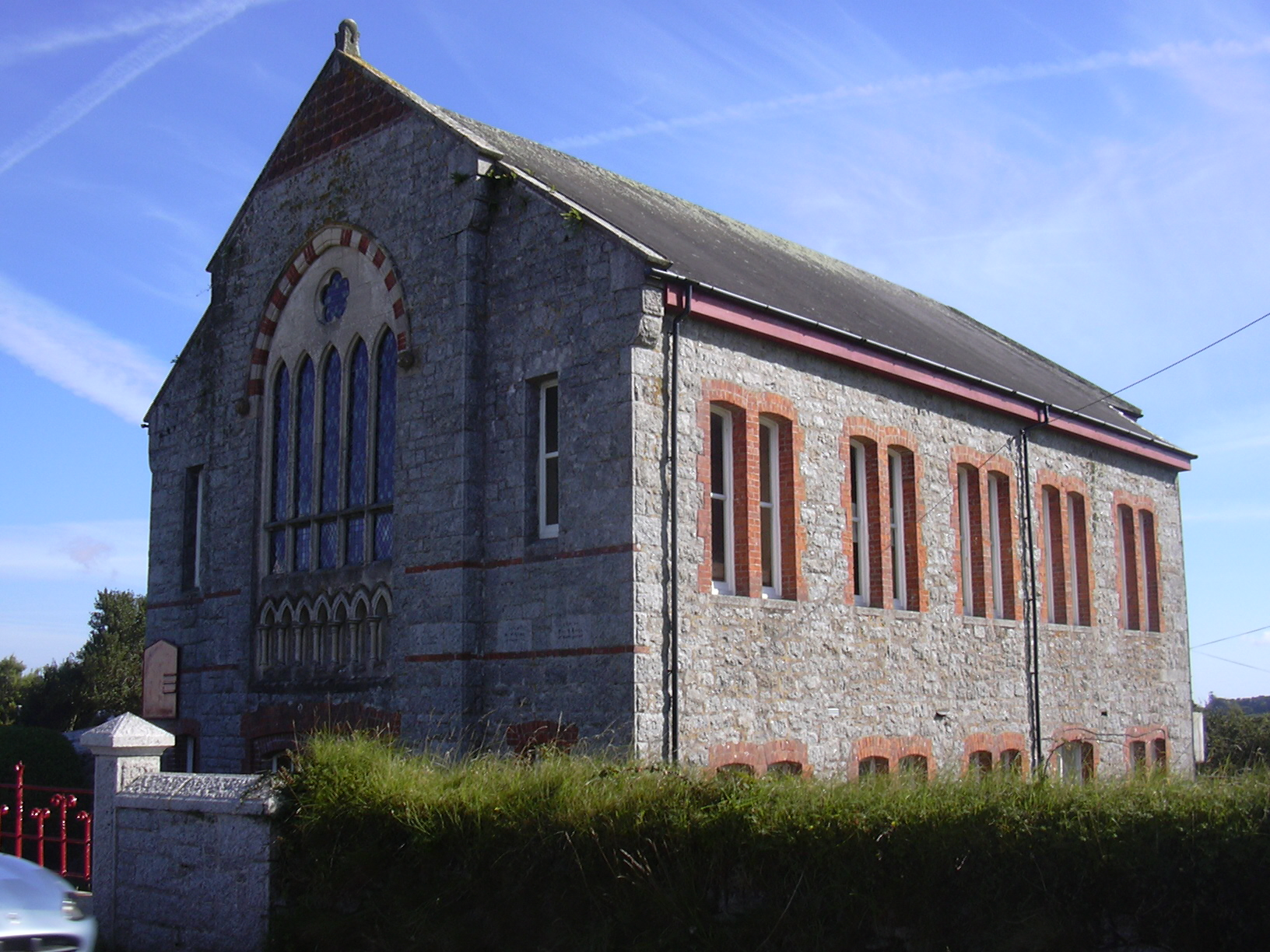
Methodist Chapel, Treverva, Cornwall

Treverva (Cornish: Trevurvo) is a small village in the west of the civil parish of Budock and at the southern end of the Argal Reservoir in Cornwall, England, United Kingdom. It lies on the B3297 road between Mabe village and Constantine village, immediately west of Lamanva. It overlooks the Argal Reservoir and the village of Church Mabe.

== History and description ==
It has a village hall and formerly had a Methodist chapel; the chapel was closed in 2012. The pipe organ from the chapel by Heard & Sons of Truro in 1921 was moved in 2016 and is now preserved at the Cornish Heritage Collection at Poldark Mine museum just 9 miles away.

The writer Alfred Gissing (1896-1975), son of George Gissing, was fostered by Mr & Mrs Smith, of Treverva Farm from 1902 until he left school.

Treverva is the birthplace of the Treverva Male Voice Choir, formed in 1936 by Edgar S. Kessell MBE. The choir itself was originally 24 members strong, mostly Treverva men at that time, and is still very active today. Edgar Kessell was the first conductor of the choir, from 1936 until his retirement from ill health in 1979. In 1976, a Westward TV documentary was made entitled Places Where They Sing, which featured members of the choir talking about their love of singing under a general narration by Edgar Kessell. The baton used by Edgar S. Kessell MBE and a conductor's music stand presented to the choir by the Holman Climax Choir, together with a considerable collection of much of the choir's early music, chapel Bibles & hymn books, the communion rail & pulpit front are all at the Cornish Heritage Collection at Poldark Mine museum in Wendron.
