= Mab =

Mab, Mabs or MAB may refer to:

== Businesses ==
- MAB Corporation, an Australian property company
- MAB Paints, an American company 1899–2007
- Malaysia Airlines (Malaysia Airlines Berhad, MAB)
- Malicet et Blin (M.A.B.), French bicycle and automobile manufacturer 1890–1925
- Manufacture d'armes de Bayonne, a French pistol manufacturer
- Mercado Alternativo Bursátil, Spain's alternative stock market
- Mabuhay Gardens, or The Mab, a nightclub in San Francisco, U.S.

== Organisations ==
- Metropolitan Asylums Board, London, dealing with the poor until 1930
- Metric Advisory Board, for metrication in New Zealand
- Movimento dos Atingidos por Barragens, a Brazilian political organization
- Muslim Association of Britain, a British Sunni Muslim organisation
- Medical Affairs Bureau, Taiwan

== People ==
- Pattie Fotheringhame (c. 1864–1955), Australian journalist under the byline "Mab"
- Mab Copland Lineman (1892–1957), American attorney
- Mab Segrest (born 1949), American writer
- James Mabbe or Mab (1572–1642), English poet
- Michael Angelo Batio (born 1956), American guitarist
- Mabel Besant-Scott or "Mabs" (1870–1952), English theosophist

== Science and technology ==
- Mab (moon), a moon orbiting the planet Uranus
- mAbs (journal), on antibody research
- MAC Authentication Bypass, an extension of IEEE 802.1X network port security
- Man and the Biosphere Programme, launched in 1971 by UNESCO
- Maschinelles Austauschformat für Bibliotheken, a metadata exchange format for libraries
- Methyl methacrylate acrylonitrile butadiene styrene, a transparent polymer similar to ABS plastic
- Monoclonal antibody (mAb), an antibody made by cloning a unique white blood cell
- Multi-armed bandit, a problem in probability theory

== Other uses ==
- Queen Mab, a fairy in English literature
- MAB, an abbreviation of Multi-author blog
- Yutanduchi Mixteco language, ISO 639-3 code mab

== See also ==
- Mabb., standard author abbreviation for botanist David Mabberley
- Henry Mabb (1872–1961), British-born Canadian politician
- Mab Darogan, a messianic figure of Welsh legend
