= MABES =

Japanese satellite mission

- Mission type: Technology development/test satellite
- Operator: NASDA
- COSPAR ID: 1986-061C
- SATCAT no.: 16910

Start of mission
- Launch date: 12 August 1986, 20:45 UTC
- Rocket: H-I
- Launch site: Tanegashima Osaki
- Contractor: Mitsubishi

End of mission
- Disposal: Decommissioned

Orbital parameters
- Reference system: Geocentric
- Regime: low Earth
- Perigee altitude: 1,489.6 kilometres (925.6 mi)
- Apogee altitude: 1,061.8 kilometres (659.8 mi)
- Inclination: 50.0 degrees
- Period: 116.8 minutes

Magnetic Bearing Flywheel Experimental System (MABES), also known as Jindai (じんだい) is a National Space Development Agency of Japan(NASDA) satellite mission. It conducted experiments on the levitation of the magnetic bearing flywheel in a zero-G environment, and tested the function of the launch lock mechanism.

On 12 August 1986, Jindai was launched from Tanegashima Space Center aboard the maiden flight of H-I rocket, along with Ajisai and Fuji.

Jindai is attached to the second stage of the H-1 rocket, and as of 2013, still remains in low Earth orbit.
