= Maybee =

Maybee may refer to:

- Maybee, Michigan
- MayBee (born 1979), South Korean singer
- Milton Edgar Maybee (1872–1947)
- John Ryerson Maybee (1918–2009)

== See also ==
- Maybe (disambiguation)
- Mabee, surname
