= Grace W. Mabee =

American musician and composer

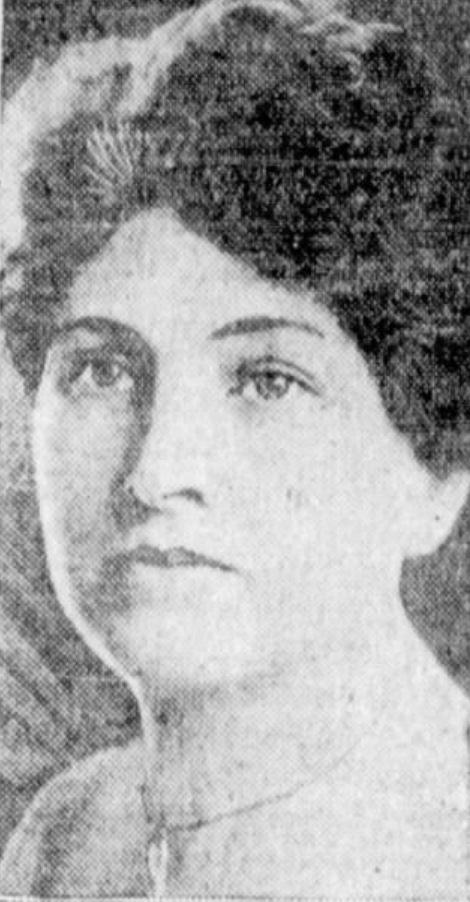
- Grace W. Mabee, from a 1926 newspaper
- Born: September 6, 1872; Woodhull, Illinois, U.S.
- Died: February 6, 1965 (aged 88); Fairfield, Vermont, U.S.
- Occupation(s): Musician, composer, clubwoman

Grace E. Widney Mabee (September 6, 1872 – February 6, 1965) was an American singer, composer, editor, and clubwoman, based in Los Angeles. She organized arts events, held office in the National Federation of Music Clubs and the National Film Music Council, and edited several publications.

== Early life and education ==
Mabee was born in Woodhull, Illinois, the daughter of John Alexander Widney and Sarah Anne Gillette Widney. She graduated from Knox College, and studied voice with Jean de Reszke in Paris.

== Career ==
Mabee, a singer and choir director, was known for leading large-scale musical events in Los Angeles. In 1922, she directed the De Lara Opera Company and the Wa-Wan Club in singing Spanish and English-language carols at the Plaza de los Angeles, as part of a city-wide Christmas singing festival led by Antonette Ruth Sabel. In 1927, she proposed a "program of Indian ceremonials", including dances, music, and an exposition of traditional crafts, as events at the Hollywood Bowl.

Mabee organized a "choral pageant" of twelve costumed choirs at the Hollywood Bowl, to welcome international visitors to Los Angeles for the 1932 Summer Olympics. In 1933, she was Southern California chair of the National Radio Audition, a singing competition. She chaired an annual competition known as the Southern California Festival of Allied Arts, beginning in 1934. The event was meant to resemble European arts festivals such as the Welsh eisteddfod.

Mabee was very active in women's clubwork. She was second vice president of the National Federation of Music Clubs, national chair for church music, and editor of their monthly publication Music in Religious Education. She was also the music chair of the California Federation of Women's Clubs. She was founder and president of the Wa-Wan Club, an organization to encourage and support American composers, artists, and dramatists who worked with Native American themes. She co-edited the National Film Music Council's publication Film Music Notes with Constance Purdy, and gave talks on film music.

== Publications ==
- "Christmas Morn" (1922, song; music by Elinor Remick Warren)
- Hymns of Service (1924, a hymnal; editor)
- "Work and Purposes of the National Film Music Council" (1945)

== Personal life ==
Widney married Canadian-born dentist William Ernest Mabee in 1897. They had three children, Ruth, William, and Marian. Her husband died in 1930. In 1938, she was in a car accident on Sunset Boulevard; the actor driving the other car was charged with drunk driving. She moved to Connecticut during World War II, to live with her daughter's family. She died in 1965, at the age of 92, in Fairfield, Vermont.
