= Burnthouse, Cornwall =

Coordinates: 50.188°N 5.128°W

Burnthouse: Cornish: Chileskys
- Location within Cornwall
- OS grid reference: SW767367
- Civil parish: Ponsanooth
- Unitary authority: Cornwall
- Ceremonial county: Cornwall
- Region: South West
- Country: England
- Sovereign state: United Kingdom
- Post town: PENRYN
- Postcode district: TR10
- Dialling code: 01326
- UK Parliament: Truro and Falmouth

Burnthouse (Cornish: Chileskys) is a hamlet in the civil parish of Ponsanooth, Cornwall, England. Burnthouse lies on the A393 road 2 miles (3.2 km) north-west of Penryn.
