= Brill, Cornwall =

Village in Cornwall, England

Brill Bre Helgh
- Village
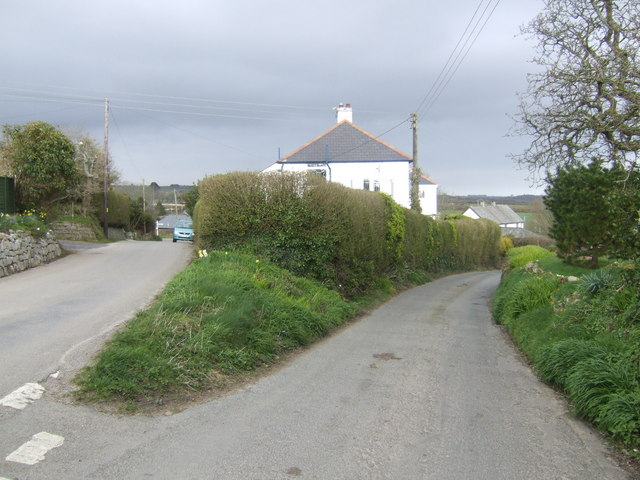
- A fork in the road at Brill
- Interactive map of Brill
- Coordinates: 50.1217°N 5.1874°W
- Country: England
- County: Cornwall
- Civil parish: Constantine

Brill (Cornish: Bre Helgh, meaning hunt hill) is a village in south-west Cornwall, England, UK. It is located within the civil parish of Constantine, 1 kilometre (0.62 mi) north-west of the village of the same name.
