= Trenoweth =

Hamlet in Cornwall, England

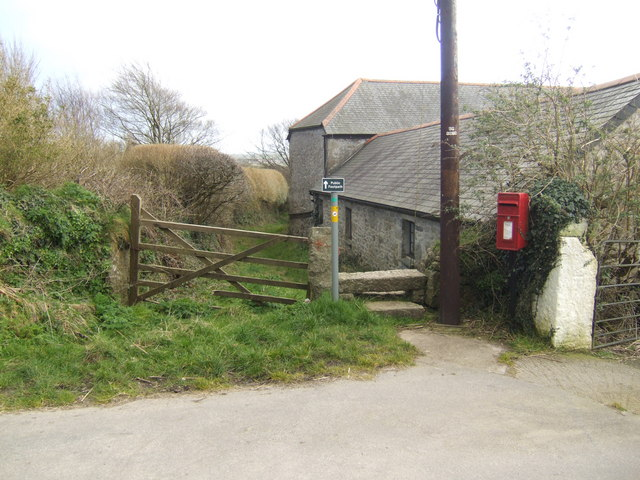
Footpath by Trenoweth Farm

Trenoweth is a hamlet in the parish of Mabe, Cornwall, England, United Kingdom.
