= Maybe =

Maybe may refer to:

== Music ==
=== Albums ===
- Maybe (Sharon O'Neill album), 1981
- Maybe, a 1970 album by The Three Degrees

=== Songs ===
- "Maybe" (Allan Flynn and Frank Madden song), 1935
- "Maybe" (Brainstorm song), 2001
- "Maybe" (Carmada song), 2014
- "Maybe" (The Chantels song), 1957
- "Maybe" (Emma Bunton song), 2003
- "Maybe" (Enrique Iglesias song), 2002
- "Maybe" (Guy Sebastian song), 2025
- "Maybe" (Ingrid Michaelson song), 2009
- "Maybe" (Jay Sean song), 2008
- "Maybe" (Kenny Rogers and Holly Dunn song), 1990
- "Maybe" (Machine Gun Kelly song), 2022
- "Maybe" (N.E.R.D song), 2004
- "Maybe" (No Angels song), 2007
- "Maybe" (Sharon O'Neill song), 1981
- "Maybe" (Sick Puppies song), 2010
- "Maybe" (Teyana Taylor song), 2014
- "Maybe" (Toni Braxton song), 2001
- "Maybe", a song by Aṣa from Beautiful Imperfection, 2010
- "Maybe", a song by Birdy from Fire Within, 2013
- "Maybe", a song by Craig Davis from 22, 2022
- "Maybe", a song by Dave Gahan released as a B-side on the single "Dirty Sticky Floors", 2003
- "Maybe", a song by Estelle from The 18th Day, 2004
- "Maybe", a song by (G)I-dle from I Trust, 2020
- "Maybe (Duet Version)", a song by Gotthard from Bang!, 2014
- "Maybe", a song by Harry Nilsson from Harry, 1969
- "Maybe", a song by Jane Morgan from 1965
- "Maybe", a song by Karol G from No Me Arrepiento de Sentir Tanto, 2026
- "Maybe", a song by Kelly Clarkson from My December, 2007
- "Maybe", a song by Kid Cudi from Man on the Moon II: The Legend of Mr. Rager, 2010
- "Maybe", a song by The Kid Laroi from F*ck Love, 2020
- "Maybe", a song by Miyuki Nakajima from Uta de Shika Ienai, 1991
- "Maybe", a song by Opshop from Second Hand Planet, 2007
- "Maybe", a song by Secondhand Serenade from Awake, 2007
- "Maybe", a song by Sienna Spiro from Sink Now, Swim Later, 2024
- "Maybe", a song by Split Enz from Mental Notes, 1975
- "Maybe", a song by Thom Pace from Maybe, 1980
- "Maybe", a song by The Wonder Stuff from Never Loved Elvis, 1991
- "Maybe", a song written in 1926 by George and Ira Gershwin, from the musical Oh, Kay!
- "Maybe", a song written by Martin Charnin and Charles Strouse, from the musical Annie
- "Maybe", a song by Valentina Monetta, representing San Marino in the Eurovision Song Contest 2014
- "May Be", a song by Yiruma from First Love, 2001

== Other uses ==
- Maybe (horse) (born 2009), a Thoroughbred racehorse
- Maybee, Michigan, a village in the United States
- Maybe monad, in functional programming

== See also ==
- Mabey (disambiguation), the surname
- Maybee (disambiguation)
- Maeby (pronounced "Maybe"), a character in the television series Arrested Development
