= Mongleath =

Hamlet in Cornwall, England

Coordinates: 50.154°N 5.099°W

Mongleath: Cornish: Mongleudh
- Location within Cornwall
- OS grid reference: SW787328
- Civil parish: Budock
- Unitary authority: Cornwall
- Ceremonial county: Cornwall
- Region: South West
- Country: England
- Sovereign state: United Kingdom

Mongleath (Cornish: Mongleudh) is a hamlet in the parish of Budock, Cornwall, England.
