= Seworgan =

Village in west Cornwall, England

Coordinates: 50.134°N 5.210°W

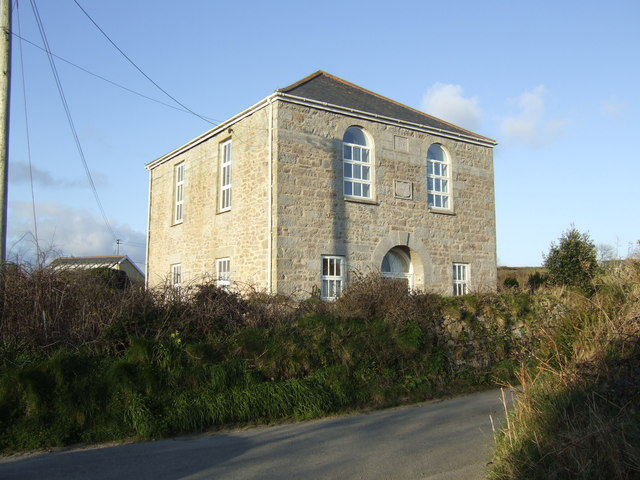
A converted chapel at Seworgan

Seworgan (Cornish: Reswodhgen, meaning Godhgen's ford) is a village in the parish of Constantine in west Cornwall, England, United Kingdom.
