= 2013 Cornwall Council election =

2013 Cornwall Council election Etholans Konsel Kernow 2013
- 2 May 2013

All 123 seats to Cornwall Council 62 seats needed for a majority

	First party	Second party	Third party
Party	Independent	Liberal Democrats	Conservative
Last election	32 seats, 23.1%	38 seats, 28.2%	50 seats, 33.8%
Seats won	37	36	31
Seat change	▲4	▼2	▼19
Popular vote	30,893	32,355	34,191
Percentage	21.9%	23.0%	24.3%
Swing	▼1.2%	▼5.2%	▼9.5%
	Fourth party	Fifth party	Sixth party
Party	Labour	UKIP	Mebyon Kernow
Last election	0 seats, 3.4%	0 seats, 3.8%	3 seats, 4.3%
Seats won	8	6	4
Seat change	▲8	▲6	▲1
Popular vote	11,383	21,306	6,824
Percentage	8.1%	15.1%	4.8%
Swing	▲4.7%	▲11.3%	▲0.5%
- Map showing the results of the 2013 Cornwall Council elections results by electoral division. Blue showing Conservative, red showing Labour, yellow showing Liberal Democrats, purple showing UKIP, grey showing Independents, old gold showing Mebyon Kernow and green showing the Green Party.
Council control before election
No Overall Control
Council control after election
No Overall Control

The Cornwall Council election, 2013, was an election for all 123 seats on the council. Cornwall Council is a unitary authority that covers the majority of the ceremonial county of Cornwall, with the exception of the Isles of Scilly which have an independent local authority. The elections took place concurrently with other local elections across England and Wales.

The Conservatives lost 18 seats, meaning they were no longer the largest group in the council. A new coalition was formed, between the Independents and the Liberal Democrats.

== Background ==
The elections for Cornwall Council were the second since its creation in 2009. Cornwall had previously been administered as a non-metropolitan county, with local government powers split between Cornwall County Council and the six non-metropolitan districts of Caradon, Carrick, Kerrier, North Cornwall, Penwith and Restormel. These were abolished as part of the 2009 structural changes to local government in England, which created a singular unitary authority. The elections in 2009 resulted in no group gaining a majority. The Conservative and Independent councillors formed a coalition to control the council, choosing the Conservative Alec Robertson as the leader.

The Boundary Commission had undertaken a review of the council's electoral divisions, which resulted in a number of changes to their boundaries and a reduction from 123 to 122 wards. One ward, Bude, would elect two councillors while the rest were represented by a single-member, leaving the number of councillors unchanged. All wards were contested in the election, with a total of 480 candidates standing across the county. The Conservatives had the most candidates with 103, followed by the Liberal Democrats with 91 and the United Kingdom Independence Party with 77 candidates. Labour fielded 68, Cornish party Mebyon Kernow had 27, the Green Party 23 and the Liberal Party stood one person. Ninety independents were also standing, with some wards having multiple independent candidates.

Elections to town and parish councils across Cornwall were also scheduled to take place on 2 May. However, not all council elections were contested, as the number of candidates was not greater than the seats available. Four parish councils with insufficient candidates would not have enough councillors to function after the elections. Councils that have vacancies after the elections would attempt to co-opt additional councillors.

== Campaign ==
The campaign was set against the backdrop of the Great Recession of the late 2000s, under a Labour government, and the subsequent public sector budget cuts of the Conservative-Liberal Democrat coalition government. There were also many issues that were pertinent to local voters in Cornwall, including the building of new houses, wind turbines, transportation infrastructure, jobs losses at the authority and the recent Council Tax freeze.

The Conservative Party, speculated to be facing losses, hoped to attract voters through their previous record as the major party in the outgoing Conservative-Independent council administration.

The Liberal Democrats, trying to become the largest party within the council, focused its campaign on cutting economic waste and increasing investment in transport infrastructure.

Mebyon Kernow highlighted the fact that they were an alternative to the parties and groupings that had made up previous UK government or Cornwall Council administrations.

UKIP, wanting to be seen as increasingly relevant to domestic politics, not just within Europe campaigned on issues of opposing the wind farm project and youth unemployment, but still highlighting its anti-EU stance.

The Labour Party focused its campaign on the fact that, at the time, there was worry as to whether the UK government's Help to Buy scheme could be used to fund the buying of second homes in the county, but was later announced to be untrue. The party also pledged to keep Council Tax rates low.

The Green Party campaigned on raising concerns over a proposed incinerator and overdeveloping land.

== Eligibility ==
All locally registered electors (British, Irish, Commonwealth and European Union citizens) who were aged 18 or over on Thursday 2 May 2013 were entitled to vote in the local elections. Those who were temporarily away from their ordinary address (for example, away working, on holiday, in student accommodation or in hospital) were also entitled to vote in the local elections, although those who had moved abroad and registered as overseas electors cannot vote in the local elections. It is possible to register to vote at more than one address (such as a university student who had a term-time address and lives at home during holidays) at the discretion of the local Electoral Register Office, but it remains an offence to vote more than once in the same local government election.

== Composition before election ==
Elected in 2009		Before election	
Party	Seats	Party	Seats
Conservative	50	Conservative	46
Liberal Democrats	38	Liberal Democrats	37
Independent	32	Independent	28
Mebyon Kernow	3	Mebyon Kernow	6
Independent (non affiliated)	0	Independent (non affiliated)	2
Labour	0	Labour	1
Vacant	0	Vacant	3

== Election result ==
Cornwall Council election, 2013^{[A]}^{[B]}
Party	Seats	Gains	Losses	Net gain/loss	Seats %	Votes %	Votes	+/−
Independent	37	14	9	▲5	30.1	21.9	30,893	▼1.2
Liberal Democrats	36	8	10	▼2	29.2	23.0	32,355	▼5.2
Conservative	31	4	19	▼19	25.2	24.3	34,191	▼9.5
Labour	8	8	0	▲8	6.5	8.1	11,383	▲4.7
UKIP	6	6	0	▲6	4.9	15.1	21,306	▲11.3
Mebyon Kernow	4	1	2	▲1	3.25	4.8	6,824	▲0.5
Green	1	1	0	▲1	0.8	2.6	3,667	▲0.7
Liberal	0	0	0	Steady	0.0	0.1	143	▼0.5

^{A} The changes in party councillors in this table differs from that listed by the BBC because it is based purely on changes from the previous election, not taking into account mid-term party defections or by-elections
^{A} The Independent grouping consists of those that were declared as "Independent" on the ballot paper, as well as those with no specification.

=== Outcome ===
Following the election the council remained in no overall control with the Independent politicians becoming the largest grouping on the council through a modest gain of councillors from the previous election. The Liberal Democrats remained the second largest party after losing 2 councillors and the Conservatives slipped to third after losing over a third of their councillors. The Labour Party, UKIP, Mebyon Kernow and the Green Party all gained seats, with UKIP and the Greens entering Cornwall Council for the first time. Mebyon Kernow had had 6 seats prior to the election, having added 3 to their 2009 total, through defection and by-election. Following the election they held 4.

Within two weeks of the election the Conservative councillor for Ladock, St Clement and St Erme, Mike Eathorne-Gibbons, defected to the Independent grouping. Eathorne-Gibbons had been tipped to be the next leader of the Conservative group in the council.

The Liberal Democrats reached out to all the other parties elected to Council, wanting to form a cross-party administration. The Conservatives decided not to join the alliance, after a lack of communication, therefore the Independents and Liberal Democrats formed a coalition administration with John Pollard of the Independents being elected leader of the council and the Liberal Democrats Jeremy Rowe as deputy leader. The Green councillor and the Independent councillor for Probus, Tregony and Grampound, Bob Egerton, formed a non-aligned independent group. The independent councillor for Wadebridge East, Collin Brewer, was not permitted to join the Independent grouping for his previous negative comments regarding disabled children. Brewer later resigned from Cornwall Council and the Liberal Democrat, Steve Knightley, won the subsequent by-election.

== Electoral division results ==
The electoral division results listed below are based on the changes from the 2009 elections, not taking into account any mid-term by-elections or party defections.

Altarnun
Party	Candidate	Votes	%	±%
Conservative	Vivian Hall	389	37.5	−3.1
UKIP	John Knights	309	29.8	N/A
Liberal Democrats	Sasha Gillard-Loft	229	22.1	−1.7
Labour	Geoff Hale	111	10.7	N/A
Majority		80	7.7	+2.6
Turnout		1,038	39.6	−9.6
Conservative hold		Swing		

Bodmin St Leonard (Note: Electoral division Bodmin St Leonard renamed from Bodmin Central)
Party	Candidate	Votes	%	±%
Liberal Democrats	Pat Rogerson	517	62.1	+12.3
UKIP	Chris Wallis	199	23.9	N/A
Labour	David Acton	73	8.8	N/A
Conservative	Peter Scoffham	43	5.2	−22.9
Majority		318	38.2	+16.5
Turnout		832	23.5	−5.0
Liberal Democrats hold		Swing		

Bodmin St Mary's (Note: Electoral division Bodmin St Mary's renamed from Bodmin West)
Party	Candidate	Votes	%	±%
Liberal Democrats	Ann Kerridge	602	56.4	−8.3
UKIP	Pete Walters	212	19.9	N/A
Mebyon Kernow	Roger Lashbrook	176	16.5	N/A
Labour	Janet Hulme	77	7.2	N/A
Majority		390	36.5	+7.2
Turnout		1,067	27.4	−2.8
Liberal Democrats hold		Swing		

Bodmin St Petroc (Note: Electoral division Bodmin St Petroc renamed from Bodmin East)
Party	Candidate	Votes	%	±%
Liberal Democrats	Steve Rogerson	649	56.1	+7.7
UKIP	John Masters	188	16.2	N/A
Independent	Lance Kennedy	181	15.6	N/A
Mebyon Kernow	John Gibbs	139	12.0	N/A
Majority		461	39.8	+36.6
Turnout		1,157	29.6	−3.1
Liberal Democrats gain from Conservative		Swing		

Breage, Germoe and Sithney (Note: Electoral division Breage, Germoe and Sithney renamed from Breage)
Party	Candidate	Votes	%	±%
Conservative	John Keeling*	562	55.1	N/A
UKIP	Michael Mahon	458	44.9	N/A
Majority		104	10.2	
Turnout		1,020	28.2	
Conservative gain from Independent		Swing		

- John Keeling was previously the Independent councillor for Breage

Bude (Note: Electoral division Bude formed from Bude North and Stratton and Bude South)
Party	Candidate	Votes	%	±%
Liberal Democrats	David Parsons	1,413		
Liberal Democrats	Nigel Pearce	1,281		
Conservative	Louise Emo	460		
Turnout		3,280	52.4	
Liberal Democrats win (new seat)				
Liberal Democrats win (new seat)				

Bugle
Party	Candidate	Votes	%	±%
Liberal Democrats	Simon Rix	316	33.4	−18.2
Conservative	Rachel Beadle	226	23.9	+0.8
Independent	Steve Hopper	152	16.1	N/A
Mebyon Kernow	Jerry Jefferies	139	14.7	−4.8
Labour Co-op	David Doyle	114	12.0	+6.2
Majority		90	9.5	−18.9
Turnout		947	25.2	−6.1
Liberal Democrats hold		Swing		

Callington
Party	Candidate	Votes	%	±%
Mebyon Kernow	Andrew Long	712	60.6	+6.1
UKIP	Dave Williams	322	27.4	N/A
Conservative	Sally Nicholson	107	9.1	−18.0
Liberal Democrats	Muriel Merrett-Jones	34	2.9	−15.5
Majority		390	33.2	+5.9
Turnout		1,175	31.4	−7.4
Mebyon Kernow hold		Swing		

Camborne Pendarves
Party	Candidate	Votes	%	±%
UKIP	Harry Blakeley	340	31.8	
Conservative	David Atherfold	319	29.8	
Mebyon Kernow	John Gillingham	211	19.7	
Labour	Trevor Chalker	200	18.7	
Majority		21	2.0	
Turnout		1,070	32.1	
UKIP win (new seat)				

Camborne Roskear
Party	Candidate	Votes	%	±%
Conservative	Paul White	475	39.1	
Labour Co-op	Jude Robinson	435	35.8	
UKIP	Tess Hulland	237	19.5	
Mebyon Kernow	John Rowe	68	5.6	
Majority		40	3.3	
Turnout		1,215	35.1	
Conservative win (new seat)				

Camborne Trelowarren
Party	Candidate	Votes	%	±%
Conservative	Jon Stoneman	243	30.3	
UKIP	Roger Laity	225	28.0	
Labour	Adam Crickett	197	24.5	
Mebyon Kernow	Zoe Fox	104	13.0	
Green	David Everett	34	4.2	
Majority		18	2.2	
Turnout		803	23.6	
Conservative win (new seat)				

Camborne Treslothan
Party	Candidate	Votes	%	±%
Labour	Robert Webber	178	19.8	
UKIP	Roy Appleton	171	19.0	
Independent	Nicholas Heather	151	16.8	
Mebyon Kernow	Alan Sanders	146	16.2	
Conservative	Morwenna Williams	136	15.1	
Liberal Democrats	Anna Pascoe	61	6.8	
Green	Jacqueline Merrick	58	6.4	
Majority		7	0.8	
Turnout		901	28.1	
Labour win (new seat)				

Camborne Treswithian
Party	Candidate	Votes	%	±%
UKIP	Viv Lewis	232	26.6	
Labour	Steve Richards	220	25.2	
Conservative	Jeff Collins	216	24.8	
Mebyon Kernow	Mike Champion	204	23.4	
Majority		12	1.4	
Turnout		872	28.5	
UKIP win (new seat)				

Camelford
Party	Candidate	Votes	%	±%
Liberal Democrats	Rob Rotchell	459	50.4	+14.0
Conservative	Keith Goodenough	452	49.6	+6.5
Majority		7	0.8	
Turnout		911	28.8	
Liberal Democrats gain from Conservative		Swing	+3.8	

Carharrack, Gwennap and St Day
Party	Candidate	Votes	%	±%
Independent	Mark Kaczmarek	791	62.4	
UKIP	David Parker	234	18.5	
Green	Geoff Garbett	131	10.3	
Labour	Rosanna Phillips	111	8.8	
Majority		557	44.0	
Turnout		1,267	32.7	
Independent win (new seat)				

Chacewater, Kenwyn and Baldhu (Note: Electoral division Chacewater, Kenwyn and Baldhu renamed from Chacewater and Kenwyn)
Party	Candidate	Votes	%	±%
Conservative	John Dyer	534	52.3	
Independent	Ross Treseder	264	25.9	
UKIP	Michael Warren	146	14.3	
Labour	Peggy Wicks	77	7.5	
Majority		270	26.4	
Turnout		1,021	33.7	
Conservative hold		Swing		

Constantine, Mawnan and Budock (Note: Electoral division Constantine, Mawnan and Budock renamed from Constantine)
Party	Candidate	Votes	%	±%
Conservative	Neil Hatton	856	57.3	
UKIP	Lomond Handley	434	29.1	
Labour	Susan Webber	203	13.6	
Majority		422	28.3	
Turnout		1,493	38.6	
Conservative hold		Swing		

Crowan and Wendron (Note: Electoral division Crowan and Wendron created from the addition of Crowan parish to Wendron)
Party	Candidate	Votes	%	±%
Mebyon Kernow	Loveday Jenkin*	751	54.9	
Conservative	Linda Taylor	290	21.2	
Independent	David Knight	227	16.6	
Labour	Jackie Harding	100	7.3	
Majority		461	33.7	
Turnout		1,368	32.1	
Mebyon Kernow gain from Independent		Swing		

- Loveday Jenkin had won a by-election for Wendron during the previous Council

Falmouth Arwenack (Note: Electoral division Falmouth Arwenack renamed from Falmouth Gyllyngvase (Not to be confused with Falmouth Arwenack division from 2009))
Party	Candidate	Votes	%	±%
Conservative	Geoffrey Evans	624	68.9	
Labour	Robin Johnson	180	19.9	
Liberal Democrats	Catherine Thornhill	102	11.3	
Majority		444	49.0	
Turnout		906	30.9	
Conservative hold		Swing		

Falmouth Boslowick
Party	Candidate	Votes	%	±%
Conservative	Alan Jewell	289	23.0	
Independent	Steve Eva	274	21.9	
Liberal Democrats	Roger Bonney	262	20.9	
UKIP	Mairi Hayworth	237	18.9	
Labour	Nicholas Jemmett	192	15.3	
Majority		15	1.2	
Turnout		1,254	33.5	
Conservative gain from Independent		Swing		

Falmouth Penwerris
Party	Candidate	Votes	%	±%
Labour Co-op	Hanna Toms	361	36.2	
Independent	Grenville Chappel	283	28.4	
Independent	John Body	183	18.4	
UKIP	Amanda Wymer	169	17.0	
Majority		78	7.8	
Turnout		996	27.5	
Labour Co-op gain from Independent		Swing		

Falmouth Smithick (Note: Electoral division Falmouth Smithick renamed from Falmouth Arwenack)
Party	Candidate	Votes	%	±%
Labour Co-op	Candy Atherton	316	33.4	
Independent	Diana Merrett	156	16.5	
Liberal Democrats	Kenny Edwards	154	16.3	
Conservative	Liz Ashcroft	130	13.8	
Independent	Christopher Smith	115	12.2	
Independent	Tony Canton	74	7.8	
Majority		160	16.9	
Turnout		945	27.3	
Labour Co-op gain from Independent		Swing		

Falmouth Trescobeas
Party	Candidate	Votes	%	±%
Independent	David Saunby	462	38.4	
Labour Co-op	Brod Ross	285	23.7	
UKIP	Carole Douglas	154	12.8	
Independent	Vicky Eva	135	11.2	
Conservative	Peter Williams	94	7.8	
Green	Euan McPhee	43	3.6	
Liberal Democrats	Rhun Davies	30	2.5	
Majority		177	14.7	
Turnout		1,203	32.6	
Independent hold		Swing		

Feock and Playing Place (Note: Electoral division Feock and Playing Place renamed from Feock and Kea)
Party	Candidate	Votes	%	±%
Conservative	Steve Chamberlain	801	44.0	
Independent	Bob Richards	700	38.4	
Liberal Democrats	Christine Ryall	183	10.0	
Labour	Jayne Kirkham	138	7.6	
Majority		101	5.5	
Turnout		1,822	46.9	
Conservative hold		Swing		

Four Lanes
Party	Candidate	Votes	%	±%
UKIP	Derek Elliott	239	28.5	
Conservative	Peter Sheppard	173	20.6	
Labour	Matthew Brown	169	20.1	
Liberal	Paul Holmes	143	17.0	
Mebyon Kernow	Chris Lawrence	115	13.7	
Majority		66	7.9	
Turnout		839	24.5	
UKIP win (new seat)				

Fowey and Tywardreath
Party	Candidate	Votes	%	±%
Liberal Democrats	David Hughes	490	37.8	
Mebyon Kernow	Fiona Carlyon	477	36.8	
Conservative	Adrian Wildish	329	25.4	
Majority		13	1.0	
Turnout		1,296	38.1	
Liberal Democrats win (new seat)				

Grenville and Stratton (Note: Electoral division Grenville and Stratton renamed from Bude North and Stratton)
Party	Candidate	Votes	%	±%
Liberal Democrats	Paula Dolphin	864	67.8	−4.6
Conservative	Shorne Tilbey	410	32.2	+4.6
Majority		454	35.6	
Turnout		1,274	36.6	
Liberal Democrats hold		Swing	-4.6	

Gulval and Heamoor
Party	Candidate	Votes	%	±%
Liberal Democrats	Mario Fonk	889	66.5	
UKIP	Rose Smith	317	23.7	
Conservative	Pamela Yeates	130	9.7	
Majority		572	42.8	
Turnout		1,336	38.9	
Liberal Democrats hold		Swing		

Gunnislake and Calstock (Note: Electoral division Gunnislake and Calstock renamed from Gunnislake)
Party	Candidate	Votes	%	±%
Labour	Dorothy Kirk	477	34.4	
Conservative	Russell Bartlett	418	30.1	
UKIP	Sam Gardner	341	24.6	
Liberal Democrats	Martin Emery	152	11.0	
Majority		59	4.3	
Turnout		1,388	37.6	
Labour gain from Conservative		Swing		

Gwinear-Gwithian and St Erth
Party	Candidate	Votes	%	±%
Conservative	Lionel Pascoe	414	30.1	
UKIP	Peter Channon	311	22.6	
Independent	Angelo Spencer-Smith	248	18.0	
Independent	Michael Roberts	183	13.3	
Labour	Michael Smith	118	8.6	
Liberal Democrats	Yvonne Bates	61	4.4	
Green	Theresa Byrne	42	3.1	
Majority		103	7.5	
Turnout		1,377	37.2	
Conservative hold		Swing		

Hayle North
Party	Candidate	Votes	%	±%
Independent	John Pollard	716	65.4	
UKIP	Lynda Chidell	260	23.8	
Labour	Anthony Phillips	118	10.8	
Majority		456	41.7	
Turnout		1,094	29.3	
Independent hold		Swing		

Hayle South
Party	Candidate	Votes	%	±%
Independent	John Coombe	503	44.7	
UKIP	Clive Polkinghorne	328	29.1	
Labour	Anne-Marie Rance	181	16.1	
Independent	Graham Coad	114	10.1	
Majority		175	15.5	
Turnout		1,126	33.9	
Independent hold		Swing		

Helston North
Party	Candidate	Votes	%	±%
Independent	Phil Martin	590	44.2	
Conservative	Alec Robertson	494	37.0	
UKIP	Leonie Gough	184	13.8	
Liberal Democrats	Mollie Scrase	68	5.1	
Majority		96	7.2	
Turnout		1,336	35.6	
Independent gain from Conservative		Swing		

Helston South (Note: Electoral division Helston South created from the majority of Helston Central)
Party	Candidate	Votes	%	±%
Independent	Judith Haycock	427	39.3	
Liberal Democrats	John Martin	215	19.8	
UKIP	Scott Blandford	210	19.3	
Conservative	Tanya Dyer	141	13.0	
Independent	James Buchanan	94	8.6	
Majority		212	19.5	
Turnout		1,087	27.2	
Independent hold		Swing		

Illogan
Party	Candidate	Votes	%	±%
Conservative	Terry Wilkins	331	28.8	
Mebyon Kernow	Stephen Richardson	290	25.2	
UKIP	Don Armstrong	259	22.5	
Liberal Democrats	David Ekinsmyth	157	13.7	
Labour	Linda Moore	113	9.8	
Majority		41	3.6	
Turnout		1,150	30.4	
Conservative hold		Swing		

Ladock, St Clement and St Erme
Party	Candidate	Votes	%	±%
Conservative	Mike Eathorne-Gibbons	666	57.4	
Green	Jo Poland	234	20.2	
Liberal Democrats	Ian Jones	171	14.7	
Labour	Stuart Venison	89	7.7	
Majority		432	37.2	
Turnout		1,160	32.6	
Conservative hold		Swing		

Lanivet and Blisland (Note: Electoral division Lanivet and Blisland renamed from Lanivet)
Party	Candidate	Votes	%	±%
Liberal Democrats	Chris Batters	532	47.5	
UKIP	Tom Hobbs	403	36.0	
Green	Steve Haynes	185	16.5	
Majority		129	11.5	
Turnout		1,120	34.1	
Liberal Democrats gain from Conservative		Swing		

Lanner and Stithians
Party	Candidate	Votes	%	±%
Independent	John Thomas	441	33.3	
Independent	Neil Plummer	399	30.1	
Independent	James Biscoe	195	14.7	
UKIP	Bob Mims	140	10.6	
Labour	Laura Eyre	85	6.4	
Independent	Peter Tisdale	66	5.0	
Majority		42	3.2	
Turnout		1,326	34.2	
Independent win (new seat)				

Launceston Central
Party	Candidate	Votes	%	±%
Liberal Democrats	Alex Folkes	551	70.8	
Conservative	Philip Tucker	134	17.2	
Labour	Kris Roberts	93	12.0	
Majority		417	53.6	
Turnout		778	25.9	
Liberal Democrats hold		Swing		

Launceston North and North Petherwin (Note: Electoral division Launceston North and North Petherwin renamed from Launceston North)
Party	Candidate	Votes	%	±%
Liberal Democrats	Adam Paynter	769	51.6	
UKIP	Graham Ford	364	24.4	
Conservative	Bill Sowerby	206	13.8	
Independent	Max Hailey	79	5.3	
Independent	Krystyna Zdan-Michajlowicz	73	4.9	
Majority		405	27.2	
Turnout		1,491	39.3	
Liberal Democrats hold		Swing		

Launceston South
Party	Candidate	Votes	%	±%
Liberal Democrats	Jade Farrington	452	45.5	
UKIP	James Wonnacott	239	24.1	
Independent	John Conway	211	21.2	
Labour	Susan Alfar	91	9.2	
Majority		213	21.5	
Turnout		993	34.4	
Liberal Democrats hold		Swing		

Lelant & Carbis Bay
Party	Candidate	Votes	%	±%
Conservative	Liz Penhaligon	393	34.7	
UKIP	Sandy Martin	256	22.6	
Green	Maxine Armstrong	156	13.8	
Independent	Richard Glanville	114	10.1	
Liberal Democrats	Howard Hollingsbee	112	9.9	
Labour	Graham Webster	102	9.0	
Majority		137	12.1	
Turnout		1,133	35.6	
Conservative hold		Swing		

Liskeard East (Note: Electoral division Liskeard East renamed from Liskeard Central)
Party	Candidate	Votes	%	±%
Independent	Sally Hawken	334	33.5	
Liberal Democrats	Tony Powell	283	28.4	
UKIP	Oliver Challis	235	23.6	
Conservative	John Stevenson	145	14.5	
Majority		51	5.1	
Turnout		997	26.1	
Independent gain from Liberal Democrats		Swing		

Liskeard North
Party	Candidate	Votes	%	±%
Independent	Roger Holmes	151	29.0	
Liberal Democrats	Jan Powell*	145	27.8	
Conservative	Thusha Balalojanan	115	22.1	
UKIP	Jenifer Lucas	110	21.1	
Majority		6	1.2	
Turnout		521	36.1	
Independent gain from Conservative		Swing		

- Previous councillor Jan Powell had defected from the Conservatives to join the Liberal Democrats in June 2011

Liskeard West and Dobwalls (Note: Electoral division Liskeard West and Dobwalls renamed from Liskeard South and Dobwalls)
Party	Candidate	Votes	%	±%
Liberal Democrats	Michael George	796	68.0	
UKIP	Patricia Marris	375	32.0	
Majority		421	36.0	
Turnout		1,171	34.7	
Liberal Democrats hold		Swing		

Looe East
Party	Candidate	Votes	%	±%
Independent	Armand Toms*	687	58.6	
Conservative	James Gowing	225	19.2	
UKIP	Les Richmond	183	15.6	
Green	Rick Harmes	47	4.0	
Liberal Democrats	Sandra Preston	30	2.6	
Majority		462	39.4	
Turnout		1,172	42.2	
Independent gain from Conservative		Swing		

- Previous councillor Armand Toms defected from the Conservatives to join the Independents in March 2013

Looe West, Lansallos and Lanteglos (Note: Electoral division Looe West, Lansallos and Lanteglos renamed from Looe West and Lansallos after the addition of Lanteglos parish)
Party	Candidate	Votes	%	±%
Liberal Democrats	Edwina Hannaford	963	51.0	
Conservative	Brian Galipeau	523	27.7	
UKIP	Tony Winter	402	21.3	
Majority		440	23.3	
Turnout		1,888	48.2	
Liberal Democrats hold		Swing		

Lostwithiel
Party	Candidate	Votes	%	±%
Conservative	Benedicte Bay	442	35.6	
UKIP	Nigel Challis	354	28.5	
Independent	Graham Jarrett	334	26.9	
Liberal Democrats	Marian Candy	113	9.1	
Majority		88	7.1	
Turnout		1,243	36.6	
Conservative hold		Swing		

Ludgvan
Party	Candidate	Votes	%	±%
Conservative	Roy Mann	477	40.2	
UKIP	Robert Smith	426	35.9	
Green	Ian Flindall	283	23.9	
Majority		51	4.3	
Turnout		1,186	34.7	
Conservative gain from Independent		Swing		

Lynher (Note: Electoral division Lynher renamed from St Ive)
Party	Candidate	Votes	%	±%
UKIP	Stephanie McWilliam	469	35.0	
Conservative	Finbar Heely	391	29.2	
Liberal Democrats	Christine Hordley	388	29.0	
Independent	Alan Neal	91	6.8	
Majority		78	5.8	
Turnout		1,339	37.8	
UKIP gain from Liberal Democrats		Swing		

Mabe, Perranarworthal and St Gluvias (Note: Electoral division Mabe, Perranarworthal and St Gluvias renamed from Mabe)
Party	Candidate	Votes	%	±%
UKIP	Michael Keogh	413	28.6	
Conservative	Chris Ridgers	410	28.4	
Liberal Democrats	John Ault	331	22.9	
Independent	Christopher Jackson	160	11.1	
Labour	Betty Ross	129	8.9	
Majority		3	0.2	
Turnout		1,443	39.7	
UKIP gain from Conservative		Swing		

Marazion and Perranuthoe (Note: Electoral division Marazion and Perranuthoe renamed from Marazion)
Party	Candidate	Votes	%	±%
Conservative	Sue Nicholas	578	41.9	
UKIP	Glyn Owen	511	37.1	
Green	Peter Williams	289	21.0	
Majority		67	4.9	
Turnout		1,378	37.0	
Conservative hold		Swing		

Menheniot
Party	Candidate	Votes	%	±%
Conservative	Bernie Ellis	549	38.0	
UKIP	David Clue	450	31.2	
Liberal Democrats	Charles Boney	352	24.4	
Green	Richard Sedgley	93	6.4	
Majority		99	6.9	
Turnout		1,444	45.7	
Conservative hold		Swing		

Mevagissey
Party	Candidate	Votes	%	±%
Labour	Michael Bunney	391	29.7	
UKIP	Michael Williams	364	27.6	
Conservative	James Mustoe	316	24.0	
Liberal Democrats	Ella Westland	184	14.0	
Green	Katherine Moseley	62	4.7	
Majority		28	2.1	
Turnout		1,316	40.5	
Labour gain from Conservative		Swing		

Mount Charles
Party	Candidate	Votes	%	±%
Independent	Gary King	312	37.0	
Conservative	Anne Double	221	26.2	
Independent	Shirley Polmounter	153	18.1	
Labour	Paul Roberts	102	12.1	
Liberal Democrats	Eileen Rix	56	6.6	
Majority		91	10.8	
Turnout		844	23.9	
Independent gain from Liberal Democrats		Swing		

Mount Hawke and Portreath
Party	Candidate	Votes	%	±%
Liberal Democrats	Joyce Duffin	808	66.7	
UKIP	Eileen Lewis	281	23.2	
Labour	Phillip Knight	123	10.1	
Majority		527	43.5	
Turnout		1,212	33.4	
Liberal Democrats hold		Swing		

Mullion and Grade-Ruan
Party	Candidate	Votes	%	±%
Independent	Carolyn Rule	577	48.0	
UKIP	Nina Sutherland	341	28.3	
Conservative	Alfred Mesropians	285	23.7	
Majority		236	19.7	
Turnout		1,203	35.9	
Independent gain from Conservative		Swing		

Newlyn and Goonhavern
Party	Candidate	Votes	%	±%
Conservative	Lisa Shuttlewood	555	46.2	
Mebyon Kernow	Rod Toms	529	44.0	
Labour	Meg Tremayne	118	9.8	
Majority		26	2.2	
Turnout		1,202	31.1	
Conservative hold		Swing		

Newlyn and Mousehole
Party	Candidate	Votes	%	±%
Conservative	Roger Harding	695	47.9	
UKIP	Tracy Smith	265	18.3	
Green	George Ford	159	11.0	
Labour	Nicholas Round	159	11.0	
Independent	Nigel Davis	92	6	
Liberal Democrats	Caroline White	82	6.3	
Majority		430	29.4	
Turnout		1,452	40.4	
Conservative hold		Swing		

Newquay Central
Party	Candidate	Votes	%	±%
Liberal Democrats	Geoff Brown	267	52.3	
Independent	Steven Slade	244	47.7	
Majority		23	4.5	
Turnout		511	17.6	
Liberal Democrats hold		Swing		

Newquay Pentire
Party	Candidate	Votes	%	±%
Liberal Democrats	Joanna Kenny	516	64.8	
Conservative	Lyndon Harrison	280	35.2	
Majority		236	29.6	
Turnout		796	25.6	
Liberal Democrats hold		Swing		

Newquay Treloggan
Party	Candidate	Votes	%	±%
Liberal Democrats	Dave Sleeman	384	54.0	
Conservative	Kevin Towill	327	46.0	
Majority		57	8.0	
Turnout		711	22.0	
Liberal Democrats hold		Swing		

Newquay Tretherras
Party	Candidate	Votes	%	±%
Conservative	Patrick Lambshead	292	35.6	
Liberal Democrats	George Edwards	269	32.8	
UKIP	Doris Latham	260	31.7	
Majority		23	2.8	
Turnout		821	26.9	
Conservative hold		Swing		

Newquay Treviglas
Party	Candidate	Votes	%	±%
UKIP	Mark Hicks	266	30.3	
Conservative	Andy Hannan	237	27.0	
Liberal Democrats	Sandy Carter	218	24.9	
Labour	Joan Bowden	156	17.8	
Majority		29	3.3	
Turnout		877	27.5	
UKIP gain from Independent		Swing		

Padstow
Party	Candidate	Votes	%	±%
Liberal Democrats	Richard Buscombe	676	53.4	
Conservative	Stephen Rushworth	589	46.6	
Majority		87	6.9	
Turnout		1,265	38.5	
Liberal Democrats gain from Conservative		Swing		

Par and St Blazey Gate
Party	Candidate	Votes	%	±%
Liberal Democrats	Douglas Scrafton	355	39.6	
Conservative	Richard Pears	279	31.1	
Independent	Alison Watkins	263	29.3	
Majority		76	8.5	
Turnout		897	28.9	
Liberal Democrats win (new seat)				

Penryn East and Mylor
Party	Candidate	Votes	%	±%
Conservative	Tony Martin	343	23.3	
Independent	John Symons	327	22.2	
Liberal Democrats	Judith Whiteley	320	21.7	
UKIP	Paula Clements	268	18.2	
Labour	Miriam Venner	124	8.4	
Mebyon Kernow	David Garwood	92	6.2	
Majority		16	1.1	
Turnout		1,474	35.6	
Conservative hold		Swing		

Penryn West
Party	Candidate	Votes	%	±%
Independent	Mary May	399	42.6	
Liberal Democrats	Cait Hutchings	261	27.9	
UKIP	Martin Orders	183	19.6	
Labour	Jim Lloyd-Davies	93	9.9	
Majority		138	14.7	
Turnout		936	26.2	
Independent hold		Swing		

Penwithick and Boscoppa (Note: Electoral division Penwithick and Boscoppa renamed from Penwithick)
Party	Candidate	Votes	%	±%
Mebyon Kernow	Matthew Luke	356	43.6	
Liberal Democrats	Christopher Rowe	295	36.2	
Conservative	Jamie Hanlon	165	20.2	
Majority		61	7.5	
Turnout		816	23.7	
Mebyon Kernow gain from Liberal Democrats		Swing		

Penzance Central
Party	Candidate	Votes	%	±%
Labour	Cornelius Olivier	398	31.4	
Liberal Democrats	Penny Young	354	27.9	
UKIP	Peter Mates	178	14.0	
Independent	John Moreland	158	12.5	
Conservative	Michael Rabbitte	127	10.0	
Mebyon Kernow	Phillip Rendle	53	4.2	
Majority		44	3.5	
Turnout		1,268	38.6	
Labour gain from Liberal Democrats		Swing		

Penzance East
Party	Candidate	Votes	%	±%
Labour	Tim Dwelly	378	30.6	
Liberal Democrats	Ruth Lewarne	358	29.0	
UKIP	Mick Faulkner	194	15.7	
Conservative	Angela Elliott	124	10.0	
Mebyon Kernow	Rob Simmons	91	7.4	
Green	Michelle Paine	89	7.2	
Majority		20	1.6	
Turnout		1,234	35.9	
Labour gain from Liberal Democrats		Swing		

Penzance Promenade
Party	Candidate	Votes	%	±%
Independent	Jim McKenna	484	33.4	
Liberal Democrats	Daniel Garside	368	25.4	
Labour	John Kirman	283	19.5	
UKIP	Elizabeth Shore	198	13.6	
Conservative	David Miles	118	8.1	
Majority		116	8.0	
Turnout		1,451	45.7	
Independent hold		Swing		

Perranporth
Party	Candidate	Votes	%	±%
Independent	Michael Callan	832	64.9	
Mebyon Kernow	Paul Dunbar	171	13.3	
Conservative	Lisa Marshall	143	11.2	
Independent	Mark Langdon	75	5.9	
Labour	Simon Coley	61	4.8	
Majority		661	51.6	
Turnout		1,282	33.9	
Independent hold		Swing		

Pool and Tehidy
Party	Candidate	Votes	%	±%
Labour	Malcom Moyle	344	41.4	
Conservative	Clive Bramley	244	29.4	
UKIP	Brenda Blakeley	242	29.2	
Majority		100	12.0	
Turnout		830	25.6	
Labour win (new seat)				

Porthleven and Helston West (Note: Electoral division Porthleven and Helston West renamed from Porthleven and Helston South)
Party	Candidate	Votes	%	±%
Independent	Andrew Wallis	706	65.0	
Conservative	Liz Lane	189	17.4	
UKIP	Stephen Gough	156	14.4	
Liberal Democrats	Richard Goedegebuur	35	3.2	
Majority		517	47.6	
Turnout		1,086	31.9	
Independent hold		Swing		

Poundstock
Party	Candidate	Votes	%	±%
Liberal Democrats	Nicky Chopak	487	37.1	
Conservative	Andrew Ades	449	34.2	
Mebyon Kernow	Paul Sousek	206	15.7	
Independent	Rupert Powell	171	13.0	
Majority		38	2.9	
Turnout		1,313	35.9	
Liberal Democrats gain from Conservative		Swing		

Probus, Tregony and Grampound (Note: Electoral division Probus, Tregony and Grampound renamed from Probus)
Party	Candidate	Votes	%	±%
Independent	Bob Egerton	903	66.1	
UKIP	Steve Kendall	283	20.7	
Conservative	Sean Marshall	138	10.1	
Labour	Norman Roach	42	3.1	
Majority		620	45.4	
Turnout		1,366	42.4	
Independent hold		Swing		

Rame Peninsular (Note: Electoral division Rame Peninsular renamed from Rame)
Party	Candidate	Votes	%	±%
Independent	George Trubody	536	28.1	
Conservative	Chris Wilton	533	28.0	
UKIP	Peter McLaren	524	27.5	
Liberal Democrats	Becky Lingard	312	16.4	
Majority		3	0.2	
Turnout		1,905	48.8	
Independent gain from Conservative		Swing		

Redruth Central
Party	Candidate	Votes	%	±%
Conservative	Mike Eddowes	257	40.3	
UKIP	Wally Duncan	221	34.6	
Labour	Raymond Webber	160	25.1	
Majority		36	5.6	
Turnout		638	20.9	
Conservative hold		Swing		

Redruth North
Party	Candidate	Votes	%	±%
Independent	Lisa Dolley	443	41.2	
Labour	Robert Barnes	365	34.0	
UKIP	Ann Wood	266	24.8	
Majority		78	7.3	
Turnout		1,074	22.9	
Independent hold		Swing		

Redruth South
Party	Candidate	Votes	%	±%
Independent	Ian Thomas	342	41.4	
Labour	Will Tremayne	311	37.7	
UKIP	Ray Wyse	173	20.9	
Majority		31	3.8	
Turnout		826	27.0	
Independent hold		Swing		

Roche
Party	Candidate	Votes	%	±%
Independent	John Wood	448	52.6	
Mebyon Kernow	Brian Higman	336	39.5	
Conservative	Derek Walker	67	7.9	
Majority		112	13.2	
Turnout		851	27.8	
Independent hold		Swing		

Roseland
Party	Candidate	Votes	%	±%
Independent	Julian German	976	67.5	
Conservative	Frederick Greenslade	252	17.4	
UKIP	Elizabeth Coleman	175	12.1	
Labour	Callum Macleod	42	2.9	
Majority		724	50.1	
Turnout		1,445	47.8	
Independent hold		Swing		

Saltash East (Note: Electoral division Saltash East renamed from Saltash Pill)
Party	Candidate	Votes	%	±%
Independent	Derek Holley	870	80.5	
Conservative	David Ward	139	12.9	
Liberal Democrats	James Shepherd	72	6.7	
Majority		731	67.6	
Turnout		1,081	32.2	
Independent hold		Swing		

Saltash North (Note: Electoral division Saltash North renamed from Saltash St Stephens*)
Party	Candidate	Votes	%	±%
Independent	Joe Ellison	372	45.6	
Liberal Democrats	Denise Watkins	270	33.1	
Independent	John Brady	174	21.3	
Majority		102	12.5	
Turnout		816	25.3	
Independent gain from Liberal Democrats		Swing		

Saltash South (Note: Electoral division Saltash South renamed from Saltash Essa*)
Party	Candidate	Votes	%	±%
Liberal Democrats	Hilary Frank	685	70.3	
Conservative	Beryl Rosekilly	289	29.7	
Majority		396	40.7	
Turnout		974	29.6	
Liberal Democrats hold		Swing		

Saltash West (Note: Electoral division Saltash West renamed from Saltash Burraton)
Party	Candidate	Votes	%	±%
Liberal Democrats	Bob Austin	628	62.5	
Conservative	Gloria Challen	377	37.5	
Majority		251	25.0	
Turnout		1,005	29.1	
Liberal Democrats hold		Swing		

St Agnes
Party	Candidate	Votes	%	±%
Liberal Democrats	Pete Mitchell	613	52.9	
Conservative	Dawn Brown	398	34.4	
Labour	Robert Harrison	147	12.7	
Majority		215	18.6	
Turnout		1,158	31.4	
Liberal Democrats hold		Swing		

St Austell Bay
Party	Candidate	Votes	%	±%
Conservative	Tom French	582	46.3	
Independent	Anne Langley	546	43.4	
Labour	Maggi Pitches	129	10.3	
Majority		36	2.9	
Turnout		1,257	34.1	
Conservative hold		Swing		

St Austell Bethel
Party	Candidate	Votes	%	±%
Liberal Democrats	Malcolm Brown	276	27.0	
Independent	Graham Walker*	264	25.8	
Conservative	Bob Davidson	194	19.0	
UKIP	Ian Proctor	173	16.9	
Labour Co-op	Brendan Parkinson	115	11.3	
Majority		12	1.2	
Turnout		1,022	27.5	
Liberal Democrats hold		Swing		

- Previous councillor Graham Eric Walker had defected from the Liberal Democrats to join the Independents in May 2012

St Austell Gover
Party	Candidate	Votes	%	±%
Independent	Sandra Heyward	475	53.3	
Conservative	Jenny Stewart	290	32.5	
Labour	Ann Phillips	126	14.1	
Majority		185	20.8	
Turnout		891	26.1	
Independent gain from Conservative		Swing		

St Austell Poltair
Party	Candidate	Votes	%	±%
Liberal Democrats	Jackie Bull	325	35.6	
Conservative	Adam Harris	232	25.4	
Mebyon Kernow	Derek Collins	187	20.5	
Labour Co-op	Andrea Lanxon	168	18.4	
Majority		93	10.2	
Turnout		912	27.6	
Liberal Democrats gain from Conservative		Swing		

St Blazey (Note: Electoral division St Blazey renamed from St Blaise)
Party	Candidate	Votes	%	±%
Liberal Democrats	Roy Taylor	310	40.1	
Labour	Stuart Wheeler	186	24.1	
Independent	Liam Bellamy	172	22.3	
Conservative	Peter Sinclair	105	13.6	
Majority		124	16.0	
Turnout		773	24.0	
Liberal Democrats hold		Swing		

St Buryan
Party	Candidate	Votes	%	±%
Conservative	Bill Maddern	608	40.5	
Independent	Norman Bliss	429	28.5	
Labour	Juliet Eavis	206	13.7	
Green	Peter Hardy	150	10.0	
Liberal Democrats	Frank Blewett	110	7.3	
Majority		179	11.9	
Turnout		1,503	40.9	
Conservative hold		Swing		

St Cleer
Party	Candidate	Votes	%	±%
Liberal Democrats	Derris Watson	463	32.2	
UKIP	David Lucas	348	24.2	
Independent	Len Clark	341	23.7	
Conservative	Lisa Sargeant	288	20.0	
Majority		115	8.0	
Turnout		1,440	39.6	
Liberal Democrats hold		Swing		

St Columb Major (Note: Electoral division St Columb Major renamed from St Columb)
Party	Candidate	Votes	%	±%
Independent	Pat Harvey	586	55.3	
Conservative	John Bell	204	19.2	
Liberal Democrats	Alvin Martin	193	18.2	
Labour	Debbie Hopkins	77	7.3	
Majority		382	36.0	
Turnout		1,060	28.3	
Independent hold		Swing		

St Dennis and Nanpean (Note: Electoral division St Dennis and Nanpean renamed from St Dennis)
Party	Candidate	Votes	%	±%
Independent	Fred Greenslade	518	72.4	
Independent	Kim Wonnacott	154	21.5	
Conservative	Barbara Hannan	43	6.0	
Majority		364	50.9	
Turnout		715	21.0	
Independent hold		Swing		

St Dominick, Harrowbarrow and Kelly Bray (Note: Electoral division St Dominick, Harrowbarrow and Kelly Bray renamed from Kelly Bray)
Party	Candidate	Votes	%	±%
Conservative	Jim Flashman	477	36.2	
UKIP	Dave Lawson	371	28.1	
Independent	Phillip Harriman	193	14.6	
Mebyon Kernow	Maria Coakley	139	10.5	
Liberal Democrats	Charles Jones	138	10.5	
Majority		106	8.0	
Turnout		1,318	38.0	
Conservative hold		Swing		

St Enoder
Party	Candidate	Votes	%	±%
Mebyon Kernow	Dick Cole	834	86.9	
Independent	Elizabeth Hawken	126	13.1	
Majority		708	73.8	
Turnout		960	27.0	
Mebyon Kernow hold		Swing		

St Germans and Landulph (Note: Electoral division St Germans and Landulph renamed from St Germans)
Party	Candidate	Votes	%	±%
Conservative	Daniel Pugh	425	31.5	
UKIP	Joseph Cummins	384	28.4	
Liberal Democrats	Jesse Foot	370	27.4	
Independent	Mervyn Ellis	171	12.7	
Majority		41	3.0	
Turnout		1,350	38.9	
Conservative hold		Swing		

St Issey and St Tudy (Note: Electoral division St Issey and St Tudy renamed from St Issey)
Party	Candidate	Votes	%	±%
Liberal Democrats	Jeremy Rowe	601	53.3	
Independent	Emma Hambly	526	46.7	
Majority		75	6.7	
Turnout		1,127	32.9	
Liberal Democrats hold		Swing		

St Ives East (Note: Electoral division St Ives East renamed from St Ives North)
Party	Candidate	Votes	%	±%
Green	Tim Andrewes	471	37.3	
Conservative	Joan Symons	339	26.8	
Independent	Morag Robertson	182	14.4	
UKIP	Roy Britton	170	13.5	
Labour	Terry Murray	70	5.5	
Liberal Democrats	Madie Parkinson-Evans	31	2.5	
Majority		132	10.5	
Turnout		1,263	41.2	
Green gain from Conservative		Swing		

St Ives West (Note: Electoral division St Ives West renamed from St Ives South)
Party	Candidate	Votes	%	±%
Independent	Andrew Mitchell	308	27.9	
Green	Ron Tulley	301	27.3	
UKIP	Stuart Guppy	194	17.6	
Conservative	Joan Tanner	124	11.2	
Labour	Malcolm Hurst	111	10.1	
Liberal Democrats	Lester Scott	66	6.0	
Majority		7	0.6	
Turnout		1,104	34.1	
Independent gain from Conservative		Swing		

St Just in Penwith
Party	Candidate	Votes	%	±%
Liberal Democrats	Sue James	574	36.6	
Independent	Kevin McFadden	332	21.2	
UKIP	Adrian Smith	304	19.4	
Labour	Kirsty Pritchard	251	16.0	
Conservative	David Lenaghan	106	6.8	
Majority		242	15.4	
Turnout		1,567	41.2	
Liberal Democrats gain from Independent		Swing		

St Keverne and Meneage
Party	Candidate	Votes	%	±%
Conservative	Walter Sanger	631	40.5	
Green	Dominic Brandreth	502	32.2	
UKIP	Brian Bailey	355	22.8	
Labour	Ann Round	69	4.4	
Majority		129	8.3	
Turnout		1,557	38.3	
Conservative gain from Independent		Swing		

St Mawgan and Colan (Note: Electoral division St Mawgan and Colan renamed from Colan and Mawgan)
Party	Candidate	Votes	%	±%
Conservative	John Fitter	588	76.1	
Mebyon Kernow	Rob Poole	185	23.9	
Majority		403	52.1	
Turnout		773	28.3	
Conservative hold		Swing		

St Mewan
Party	Candidate	Votes	%	±%
Independent	Malcolm Harris	367	36.6	
Conservative	John Kneller	323	32.2	
Liberal Democrats	Janet Lockyer	312	31.1	
Majority		44	4.4	
Turnout		1,002	32.7	
Independent gain from Liberal Democrats		Swing		

St Minver and St Endellion (Note: Electoral division St Minver and St Endellion renamed from St Endellion)
Party	Candidate	Votes	%	±%
Independent	Andy Penny	455	42.1	
Conservative	Brian Gisbourne	439	40.6	
Liberal Democrats	Ed Headley-Hughes	186	17.2	
Majority		16	1.5	
Turnout		1,080	42.0	
Independent gain from Conservative		Swing		

St Stephen-In-Brannel (Note: Electoral division St Stephen-In-Brannel renamed from St Stephen)
Party	Candidate	Votes	%	±%
Independent	Des Curnow	636	65.8	
UKIP	Keith Hickman	331	34.2	
Majority		305	31.5	
Turnout		967	25.6	
Independent hold		Swing		

St Teath and St Breward (Note: Electoral division St Teath and St Breward renamed from St Teath)
Party	Candidate	Votes	%	±%
Independent	John Lugg	628	51.5	
Liberal Democrats	Eddie Jones	388	31.8	
Conservative	Henry Hine	204	16.7	
Majority		240	19.7	
Turnout		1,220	37.7	
Independent hold		Swing		

Stokeclimsland
Party	Candidate	Votes	%	±%
Independent	Neil Burden	810	62.0	
UKIP	Antonia Willis	272	20.8	
Conservative	John Phillips	124	9.5	
Liberal Democrats	Wayne Gostling	100	7.7	
Majority		538	41.2	
Turnout		1,306	42.6	
Independent hold		Swing		

Threemilestone and Gloweth
Party	Candidate	Votes	%	±%
Independent	Tim Deeble	251	26.2	
Independent	John Humar	207	21.6	
Conservative	Adam Desmonde	182	19.0	
Liberal Democrats	Moyra Nolan	149	15.6	
Labour	Phillip Fenton	69	7.2	
Independent	Ken Hart	64	6.7	
Independent	Chris Pascoe	36	3.8	
Majority		44	4.6	
Turnout		958	29.8	
Independent gain from Liberal Democrats		Swing		

Tintagel
Party	Candidate	Votes	%	±%
Liberal Democrats	Glenton Brown	664	57.1	
UKIP	Susan Bowen	313	26.9	
Conservative	Paul Charlesworth	185	15.9	
Majority		351	30.2	
Turnout		1,162	36.1	
Liberal Democrats hold		Swing		

Torpoint East
Party	Candidate	Votes	%	±%
Liberal Democrats	Brian Hobbs	466	45.2	
Conservative	John Crago	300	29.1	
UKIP	Rob White	265	25.7	
Majority		166	16.1	
Turnout		1,031	33.2	
Liberal Democrats hold		Swing		

Torpoint West
Party	Candidate	Votes	%	±%
Conservative	Mike Pearn	649	83.3	
Liberal Democrats	Adam Killeya	130	16.7	
Majority		519	66.6	
Turnout		779	24.9	
Conservative hold		Swing		

Trelawny
Party	Candidate	Votes	%	±%
Liberal Democrats	Jim Candy	695	43.4	
Conservative	Peter Hunt	513	32.1	
UKIP	Anthony Marris	392	24.5	
Majority		182	11.4	
Turnout		1,600	41.8	
Liberal Democrats gain from Conservative		Swing		

Truro Boscawen (Note: Electoral division Truro Boscawen renamed from Truro Moresk (Not to be confused with Truro Boscawen division from 2009))
Party	Candidate	Votes	%	±%
Independent	Bert Biscoe	680	52.6	
Conservative	Noel Krishnan	226	17.5	
Green	Lindsay Southcombe	135	10.4	
Liberal Democrats	Maurice Vella	127	9.8	
Labour	Susan Street	125	9.7	
Majority		454	35.1	
Turnout		1,293	30.9	
Independent hold		Swing		

Truro Redannick (Note: Electoral division Truro Redannick renamed from Truro Boscawen)
Party	Candidate	Votes	%	±%
Liberal Democrats	Rob Nolan	702	52.9	
Conservative	Lorrie Eathorne-Gibbons	315	23.8	
Mebyon Kernow	Lance Dyer	113	8.5	
Labour	Pamela Atherton	109	8.2	
Green	Howard Newlove	87	6.6	
Majority		387	29.2	
Turnout		1,326	36.7	
Liberal Democrats hold		Swing		

Truro Tregolls
Party	Candidate	Votes	%	±%
Independent	Loic Rich	461	40.9	
Liberal Democrats	Ros Cox	217	19.3	
Conservative	Judy Cresswell	182	16.2	
UKIP	James Minahan	169	15.0	
Labour	Margaret George	68	6.0	
Green	Godfrey Allen	29	2.6	
Majority		244	21.7	
Turnout		1,126	31.1	
Independent gain from Liberal Democrats		Swing		

Truro Trehaverne
Party	Candidate	Votes	%	±%
Conservative	Fiona Ferguson	565	44.7	
Independent	Charlotte Mackenzie	279	22.1	
UKIP	Michael Inglefield	174	13.8	
Green	Steve Angove	87	6.9	
Labour	Richard Lees	84	6.7	
Liberal Democrats	Peter Congdon	74	5.9	
Majority		286	22.6	
Turnout		1,263	33.7	
Conservative hold		Swing		

Wadebridge East
Party	Candidate	Votes	%	±%
Independent	Collin Brewer	335	25.2	
Liberal Democrats	Steve Knightley	331	24.9	
UKIP	Roderick Harrison	208	15.6	
Labour	Adrian Jones	161	12.1	
Conservative	Brian Bennetts	150	11.3	
Independent	Sarah Maguire	146	11.0	
Majority		4	0.3	
Turnout		1,331	42.0	
Independent hold		Swing		

Wadebridge West
Party	Candidate	Votes	%	±%
Conservative	Scott Mann	830	65.5	
Liberal Democrats	Elliot Osborne	308	24.3	
Labour Co-op	John Whitby	129	10.2	
Majority		522	41.2	
Turnout		1,267	41.2	
Conservative hold		Swing		

== Changes 2013–2017 ==
In February 2016, the Independent councillor for Redruth North, Lisa Dolley, who had been Deputy Leader of the Independent group on the council, defected to the Liberal Democrats. She later left the Liberal Democrats and designated herself as a standalone independent in December of that year.

In September 2016 Paul White, the Conservative councillor for Camborne Roskear, left the Conservative group and designated himself as a standalone independent.

In December 2016 Hanna Toms, the Labour councillor for Falmouth Penwerris, was expelled from the Labour group after pleading guilty to two counts of benefits fraud before Truro Magistrates Court. She continued to sit as a standalone independent.

Later in December 2016 Jon Stoneman, the Conservative councillor for Camborne Trelowarren, left the Conservative group and designated himself as a standalone independent.

A total of 14 by-elections were held to Cornwall Council in the 2013–2017 term of office. They are illustrated in the table below.

By-election	Date	Incumbent	Party	Winner	Party	Cause
Four Lanes	1 September 2016	Derek Elliot	UKIP	Nathan Billings	Liberal Democrats	Resignation
Newlyn and Goonhavern	28 July 2016	Lisa Shuttlewood	Conservative	Maggie Vale	Liberal Democrats	Resignation
St Teath and St Breward	14 July 2016	John Lugg	Independent	Dominic Fairman	Liberal Democrats	Resignation
Newquay Treviglas	14 July 2016	Mark Hicks	UKIP	Paul Summers	Liberal Democrats	Resignation
Menheniot	14 April 2016	Bernie Ellis	Conservative	Phil Seeva	Conservative	Death
Wadebridge West	14 April 2016	Scott Mann	Conservative	Karen McHugh	Liberal Democrats	Resignation due to being elected as an MP at the 2015 General Election
Launceston Central	14 January 2016	Alex Folkes	Liberal Democrats	Gemma Massey	Liberal Democrats	Resignation due to mental health reasons
Camborne Pendarves	20 August 2015	Harry Blakeley	UKIP	John Herd	Conservative	Resignation
Constantine, Mawnan and Budock	7 May 2015	Neil Hatton	Conservative	John Bastin	Conservative	Resignation
Camborne Treswithian	7 May 2015	Viv Lewis	UKIP	Jude Robinson	Labour	Resignation
Mevagissey	6 November 2014	Michael Bunney	Labour	James Mustoe	Conservative	Resignation
Mabe, Perranarworthal and St Gluvias	17 July 2014	Michael Keogh	UKIP	Reginald Williams	Conservative	Resignation
Illogan	10 July 2014	Terry Wilkins	Conservative	David Ekinsmyth	Liberal Democrats	Resignation as a result of his falsely claiming to have an MBE.
Wadebridge East	5 September 2013	Collin Brewer	Independent	Steve Knightley	Liberal Democrats	Resignation following a motion of censure

Launceston Central by-election: 14 January 2016
Party	Candidate	Votes	%	±%
Liberal Democrats	Gemma Massey	515	63.0	−7.8
Conservative	Val Budgen-Cawsey	226	27.6	+10.4
Green	Roger Creagh-Osborne	65	7.9	N/A
CPA	John Allman	12	1.5	N/A
Majority		289	35.3	−18.3
Turnout		818	27.2	+1.3
Liberal Democrats hold		Swing		
