= Budock Water =

Village in Cornwall, England

Coordinates: 50.1467°N 5.103°W

Budock Water: Cornish: Roseglos
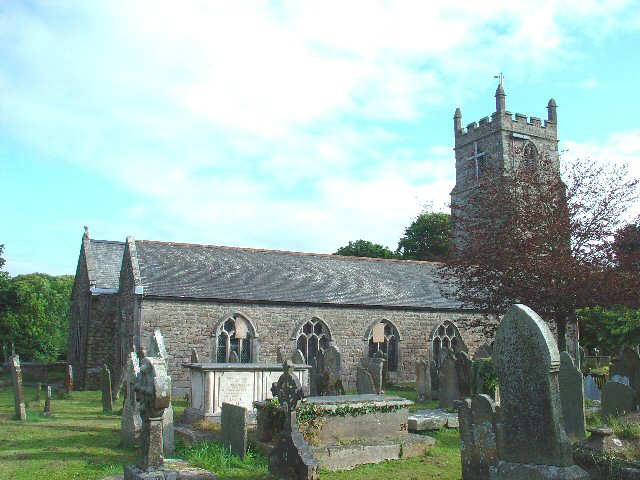
- St Budock Parish Church

- Location within Cornwall
- Population: 1,684 (Budock parish, 2021)
- OS grid reference: SW783320
- Civil parish: Budock
- Unitary authority: Cornwall
- Ceremonial county: Cornwall
- Region: South West
- Country: England
- Sovereign state: United Kingdom
- Post town: FALMOUTH
- Postcode district: TR11
- Dialling code: 01326
- Police: Devon and Cornwall
- Fire: Cornwall
- Ambulance: South Western
- UK Parliament: Camborne and Redruth

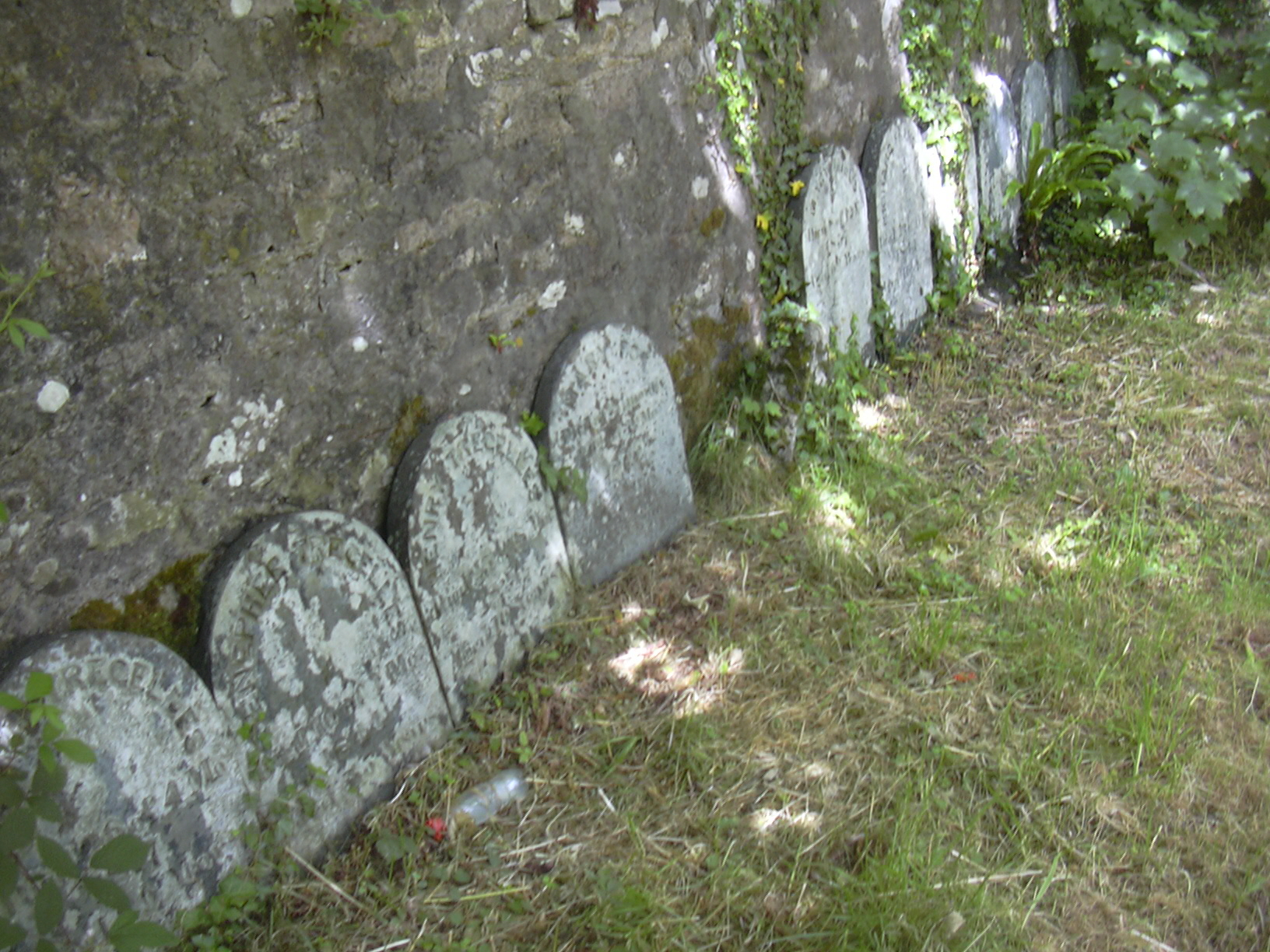
Quaker gravestones at Budock

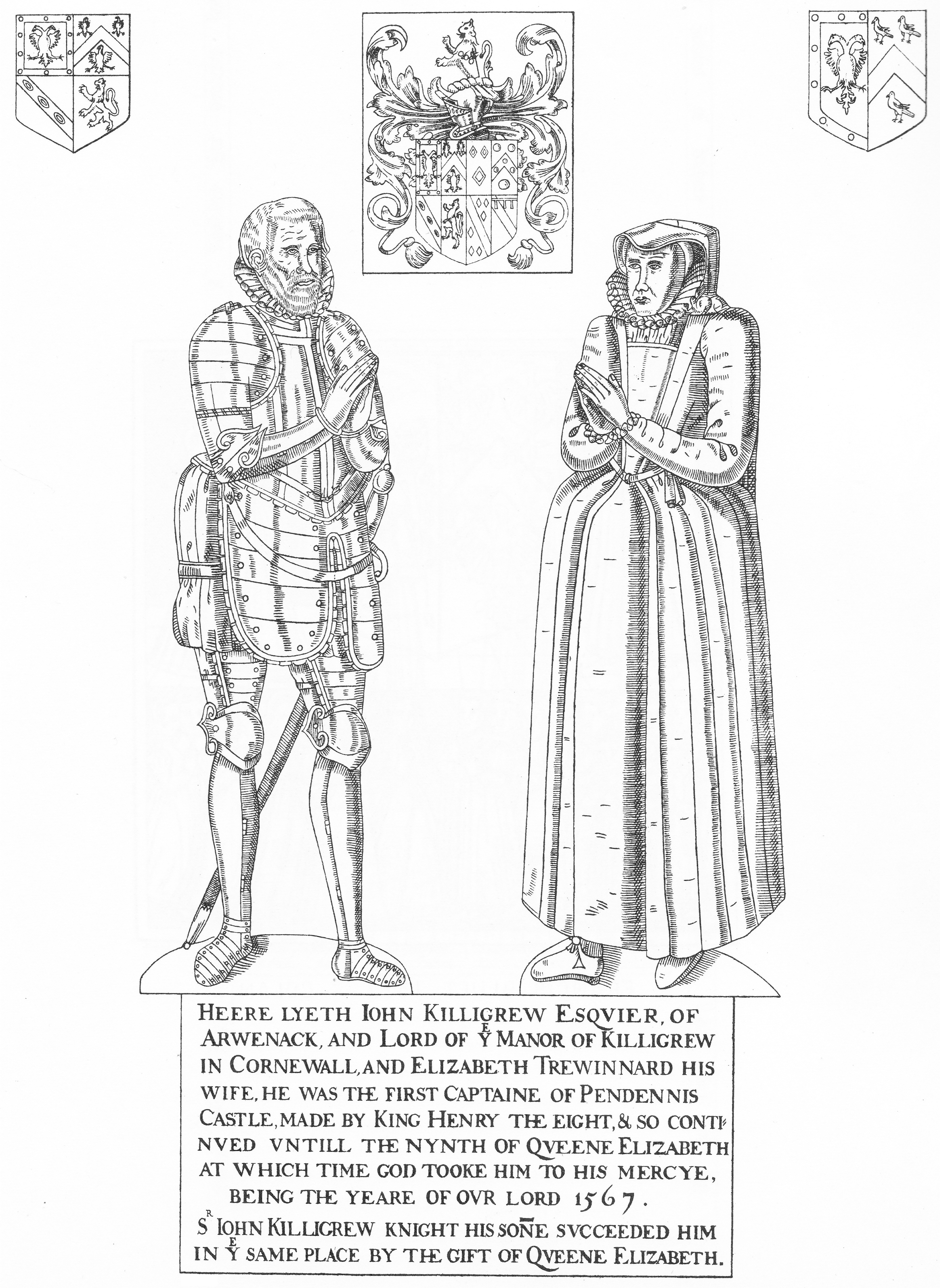
Monumental brass of John III Killigrew (d.1567) of Arwenack, Falmouth, first Governor of Pendennis Castle. St Budock's Church

Budock Water (Cornish: Roseglos, meaning church hillspur) is a village and former manor in the civil parish of Budock, Cornwall, England, United Kingdom. The village is situated two miles (3.2 km) west of Falmouth. At the 2021 census the population of Budock parish was 1,684.

As well as the main village of Budock Water, the parish of Budock also includes the smaller villages of Lamanva and Treverva and encompasses 2,400 acres (9.7 km^{2}) of land. The hamlet of Mongleath is also in the parish. Arable farming in the parish includes early potatoes, broccoli and daffodils.

== Amenities ==
Budock Water village has a public house called the Trelowarren Arms (known as the Trelly) and there is also a hotel in the parish (Penmorvah Manor) which has a restaurant that is open to non-residents. The Penmorvah was also known as a popular night club called "Manderley" and is opposite Penjerrick Garden which is open to the public on certain days of the week. The village had a post office until 2009 when it was closed following the central government review of rural post offices, but the shop remains as another hub for the village. There is a regular bus service connecting the village with both Falmouth and Helston as well as the outlying villages in the area.

== History and notable buildings ==
The historical name for the village of Budock Water was recorded as Roseglos in 1634 and Eglos-Rose in 1749, from the Cornish language ros (heathland) and eglos (church). The church of St Budock is recorded in Latin in 1208 as Ecclesia Sancti Budoci de Treliver (the Church of St Budock at Treliver), Seynt Buthek in 1449, Bythick in 1727, and in Cornish as Eglos Budock in 1769 and 1844. The parish is recorded in Cornish as Plu Vuthek (Budock's parish) circa 1400, and the Parish of Bewtheck by Penryn in 1466. In Latin it was known as Parochia Budoci Majoris (the parish of Budock Major) in 1349, this was to distinguish it from Budock Vean (Little Budock) in the neighbouring parish of Constantine. The church at Budock Vean was called Eglosbuthek byan in 1469, and Buthack vyan in 1574.

The earliest recorded rector of Budock was in 1207, although it is believed that the link to Budoc, a Celtic saint, dates back to 470 AD. The parish church, which has a western tower, is partly of the 13th and partly of the 15th century: the box pews which in most churches were removed in the Victorian period remained. Falmouth was originally part of the parish of Budock. The church contains a monumental brass to John III Killigrew (d.1567) of Arwennack, Falmouth, the first Governor of Pendennis Castle and his wife Elizabeth Trewennard. Besides the parish church, the village also had a Wesleyan Methodist Chapel originally built around 1814, and rebuilt in 1843. Declining congregations eventually resulted in this chapel being closed and sold, and that building was used as a meadery restaurant and is now a carvery. There is no longer an active Methodist Chapel at Treverva which was used by the famous Treverva Choir; they now practise at Penryn Rugby Club.

At Rosemerryn is a substantial house of about 1730. The Crag, Maenporth, was a house built by Alfred Waterhouse in 1865 incorporating some Cornish elements: subsequently a hotel, it burnt down in 1981.

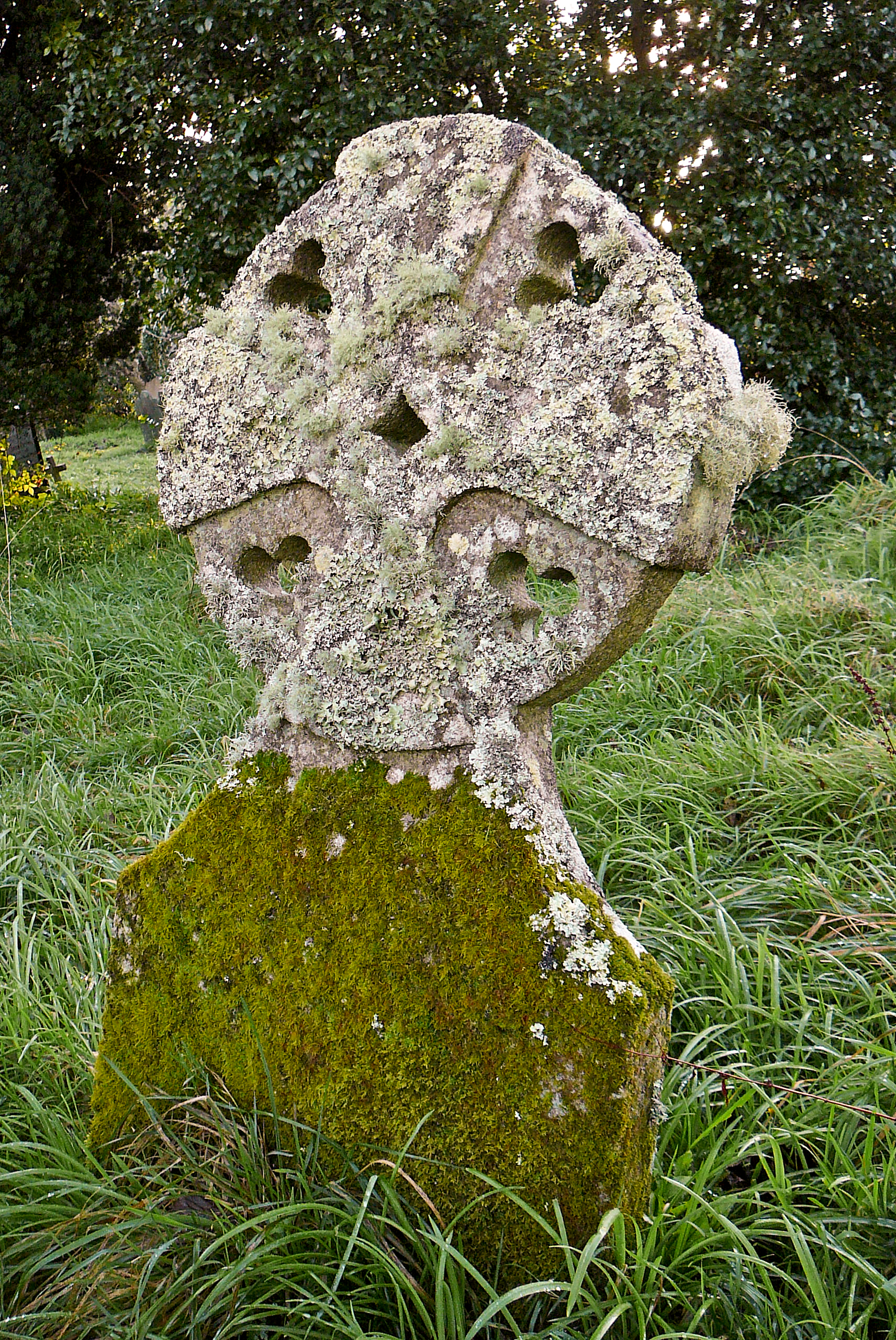
One of the crosses in the churchyard

There are two Cornish crosses in the parish; both are in the churchyard. There is also a cross base at Nangitha.

=== Administrative history ===
Budock was an ancient parish in the Kerrier Hundred of Cornwall. The parish formerly also included the area that is now Falmouth. In the 16th century Budock was downgraded to be a chapelry of the neighbouring parish of St Gluvias for ecclesiastical purposes, although Budock continued to be treated as a separate parish for civil purposes. Budock regained its ecclesiastical independence from St Gluvias in 1890.

Falmouth was incorporated as a borough in 1661. Three years later, in 1664, a new parish of Falmouth was also created from part of Budock, covering both the new borough and surrounding rural areas.

The borough of Falmouth was enlarged to take in further areas from Budock parish in 1892. The Local Government Act 1894 directed that parishes could no longer straddle borough boundaries, and so Budock was split into "Budock Urban" covering the parts inside Falmouth borough and "Budock Rural" covering the rest. Budock Urban parish was abolished in 1920 when the urban parishes within Falmouth were united into a single parish of Falmouth matching the borough. The borough was enlarged again in 1934, taking further areas from Budock Rural, which was renamed "Budock" at the same time.

== Education and social activities ==
The village school (a Church of England primary school) closed in 1990 when it was amalgamated with two other church schools. The original building was sold and converted into a private house. Local children benefit from a playing field in the middle of the village, donated by a local landowner, equipped with swings and climbing frames. There is a village hall that is used by clubs and organisations ranging from the toddlers group, quilters, bingo, a monthly luncheon club, yoga classes, a martial arts group, zumba sessions right up to the Over 60s Club.

== Cornish wrestling ==
Cornish wrestling tournaments, for prizes were held in Buddock Water in the 1800s.

== Notable people ==
Tony Kellow would certainly rank as one of its most famous sons. He won the "Golden Boot" in 1980/81 for being the Football League's highest goal scorer in all four divisions. A memorial to him stands near the Trelowarren Arms and a shrine in his honour is in the pub where Tony was a very popular figure. He still holds the record for goals scored at Exeter City who sold him to Blackpool for a then record fee.
