= Lamanva =

Coordinates: 50.143°N 5.133°W

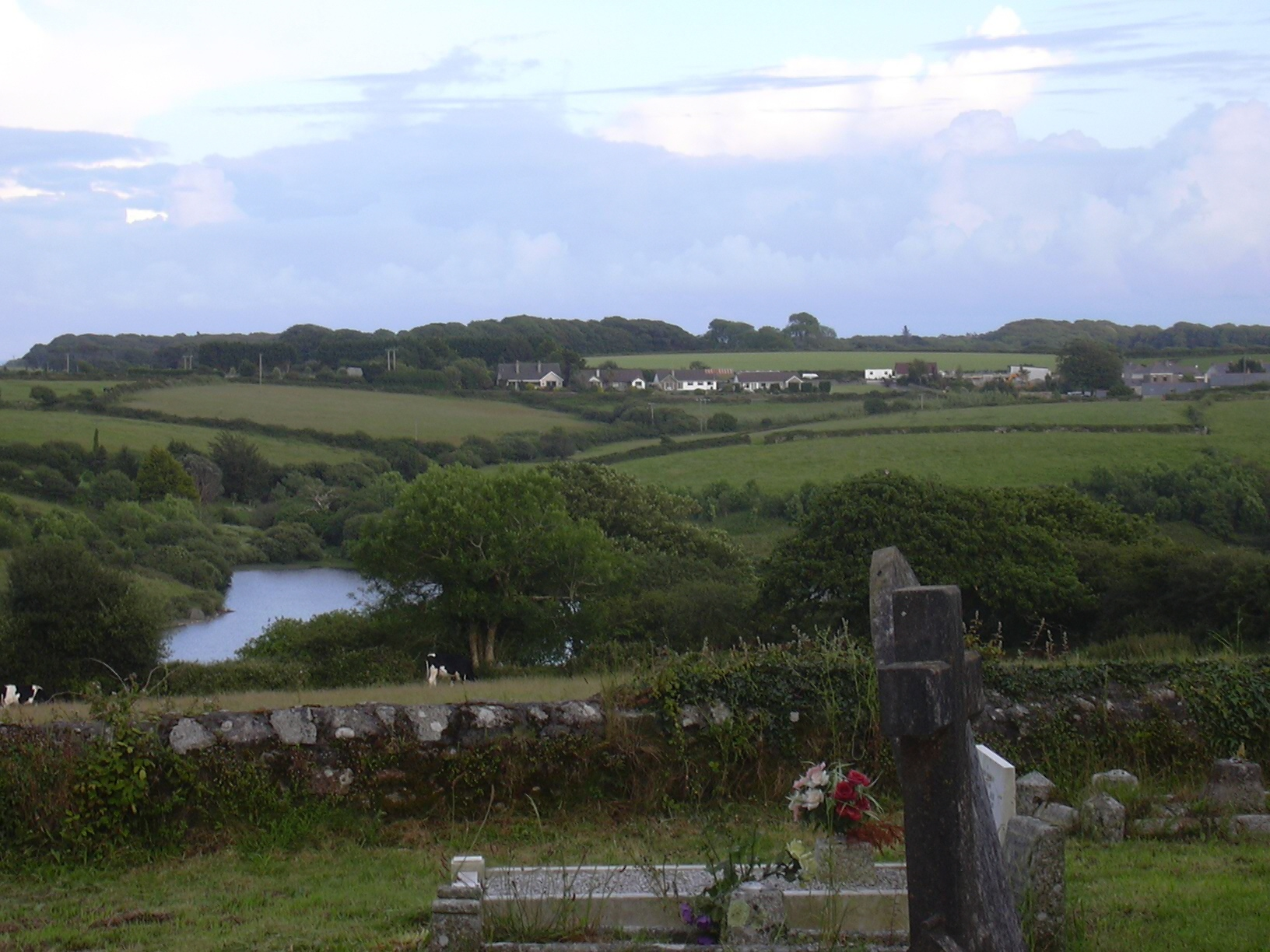
- Lamanva

- Location within Cornwall
- OS grid reference: SW762317
- Civil parish: Budock
- Unitary authority: Cornwall
- Ceremonial county: Cornwall
- Region: South West
- Country: England
- Sovereign state: United Kingdom
- Post town: Penryn
- Postcode district: TR10

Lamanva is a village near Budock Water in Cornwall, England. Residents of the village are included in the general population of Cornwall.
