= Maenporth =

Settlement in Cornwall, England

Coordinates: 50°7′28″N 5°5′36″W

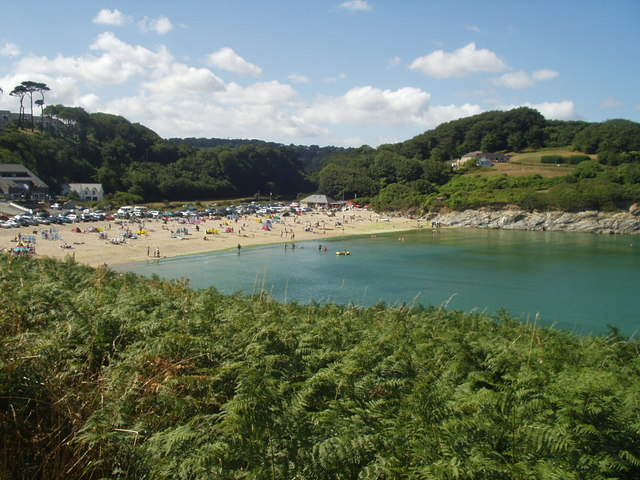
Maenporth Beach

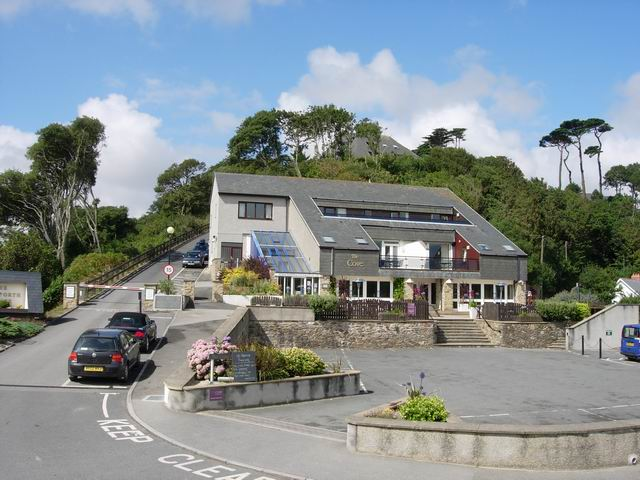
entrance to Maenporth Estate

Maenporth (Cornish: Meynporth, meaning cove of stones) is a cove and beach in west Cornwall, England. It is situated approximately two miles (3 km) south-southwest of Falmouth on the estuary of the River Fal.

Maenporth cove faces east across Falmouth Bay with views towards Pendennis Castle and the lighthouse on St Anthony Head.

The South West Coast Path runs through Maenporth. Behind the cove, wetland supports varied birdlife including the grey heron and the little egret.

The beach shelves gently and at low water leaves an area of shallow water that is safe for swimming. The beach has facilities for launching boats, scuba diving and sea kayaking. Other facilities include car parking, a cafe and public toilets. On the hill above the beach is modern holiday accommodation in the Maenporth Estate. Neighbouring beaches include Swanpool and Gyllyngvase.

== History ==
The beach head has been built up by easterly winds, and covers a previous natural harbour and human activity. The heritage environment record indicates a forest terrain beneath the sandy beach. A total of seven tumuli in the area have been identified by aerial surveys, suggesting a significant settlement and trading base in the middle to late Bronze Age. Well sheltered for vessels against westerly winds, and probably navigable in the two flooded valleys above the beach head, the likely trading commodity was tin, brought overland from the west. Sand obstructs the harbour entrance, thought to be on the south end of the inlet, where a more recent stone quay is now obscured by blown sand. A trackway of this period routes west, past the creeks and riverhead of Helford, towards Helston and Penzance. In the early 20th century, there was a chemical works based here. On the night of 30 December 1978, the Scottish trawler Ben Asdale was wrecked off Maenporth in a heavy easterly gale, on the north escarpment, adjacent to a rock called the Devil's Eye. The latter is now eroded, but once had a hole in the shalestone rocks. Substantial remains of the trawler are still visible.
