= Four Lanes, Beacon and Troon (electoral division) =

Electoral division of Cornwall in the UK

- ward Cornwall Council
- Boundary of Four Lanes, Beacon and Troon in Cornwall from 2021.
- County: Cornwall

Current ward
- Created: 2021
- Councillor: Sally Weedon (Conservative)
- Number of councillors: One
- Created from: Camborne Treslothan; Four Lanes

Four Lanes, Beacon and Troon is an electoral division of Cornwall in the United Kingdom which returns one member to sit on Cornwall Council. It was created at the 2021 local elections, being created from the former divisions of Camborne Treslothan and Four Lanes. The current councillor is Sally Weedon, a Conservative.

== Boundaries ==
Four Lanes, Beacon and Troon represents the southern portion of the parish of Camborne and the southern portion of the parish of Carn Brea. This includes the villages of Bolenowe, Higher Condurrow, Knave-Go-By, Pengegon (shared with the Camborne Roskear and Tuckingmill electoral division), and Troon in the parish of Camborne, and the villages of Brea, Carn Brea Village, Carnkie, Four Lanes, Penhallick (shared with the Pool and Tehidy electoral division), Piece, and Treskillard in the parish of Carn Brea.

== Councillors ==
Election	Member	Party
2021	Sally Weedon	Conservative

== Election results ==
=== 2021 election ===
Four Lanes, Beacon and Troon
Party	Candidate	Votes	%	±%
Conservative	Sally Anne Weedon	625	42.1	N/A
Labour	Donna Birrell	415	27.9	N/A
Liberal	Paul Holmes	182	12.2	N/A
Green	Fergus Wright	143	9.6	N/A
Mebyon Kernow	Rhisiart Tal-e-bot	77	5.2	N/A
Freedom Alliance	Shelley Tasker	44	3.0	N/A
Majority		210	14.1	N/A
Rejected ballots		16	1.1	N/A
Turnout		1,502		N/A
Conservative win (new seat)				
