= Four Lanes (electoral division) =

Former electoral division of Cornwall in the UK

- Former ward Cornwall Council
- Boundary of Four Lanes in from 2013-2021.
- County: Cornwall

2013–2021
- Number of councillors: One
- Replaced by: Four Lanes, Beacon and Troon; Pool and Tehidy
- Created from: Carn Brea South

Four Lanes (Cornish: Peder Bownder) was an electoral division of Cornwall in the United Kingdom which returned one member to sit on Cornwall Council between 2013 and 2021. It was abolished at the 2021 local elections, being succeeded by Four Lanes, Beacon and Troon and Pool and Tehidy.

== Councillors ==
Election	Member	Party
2013	Derek Elliot	UKIP
2017	Robert Hendry	Independent
2021	Seat abolished	

== Extent ==
Four Lanes covered the villages of Piece, Carnkie and Four Lanes and the hamlets of Tolskithy, Penhallick and Treskillard. The village of Illogan Highway was shared with the Pool and Tehidy division, the settlement of Blowinghouse was shared with the Redruth North division, the village of Brea was shared with the Camborne Treslothan division and parts of Carn Brea Village were covered by Redruth South division. The division covered 922 hectares in total.

== Election results ==
=== 2017 election ===
2017 election: Four Lanes
Party	Candidate	Votes	%	±%
Independent	Robert Hendry	509	42.7	
Liberal Democrats	Florence Macdonald	280	23.5	
Conservative	Peter Sheppard	233	19.5	
Mebyon Kernow	Christopher Lawrence	82	6.9	
Liberal	Paul Holmes	77	6.5	
Majority		229	19.2	
Rejected ballots		12	1.0	
Turnout		1193	34.2	
Independent gain from UKIP		Swing		

=== 2013 election ===
2013 election: Four Lanes
Party	Candidate	Votes	%	±%
UKIP	Derek Elliot	239	28.5	
Conservative	Peter Sheppard	173	20.6	
Labour	Metthew Brown	169	20.1	
Liberal	Paul Holmes	143	17.0	
Mebyon Kernow	Christopher Lawrence	115	13.7	
Majority		66	7.9	
Rejected ballots		0	0.0	
Turnout		839	24.5	
UKIP win (new seat)				
