= Camborne West and Treswithian (electoral division) =

Electoral division of Cornwall in the UK

- ward Cornwall Council
- Boundary of Camborne West and Treswithian in Cornwall from 2021.
- County: Cornwall

Current ward
- Created: 2021
- Councillor: John Morgan (Conservative)
- Number of councillors: One
- Created from: Camborne Treswithian

Camborne West and Treswithian is an electoral division of Cornwall in the United Kingdom which returns one member to sit on Cornwall Council. It was created at the 2021 local elections, being created from the former division of Camborne Treswithian. The current councillor is John Morgan, a member of the Conservative Party.

== Boundaries ==
Camborne West and Treswithian represents the western portion of the town of Camborne, including the villages of Treswithian, Penponds, Barripper, and Kehelland. It is bordered to the north by the ocean, to the east by the electoral divisions of Pool and Tehidy, Camborne Roskear and Tuckingmill, and Camborne Trelowarren, to the south by the division of Four Lanes, Beacon and Troon and Crowan, Sithney and Wendron, and to the west by the division of Gwinear-Gwithian and Hayle East.

== Councillors ==
Election	Member	Party
2021	John Morgan	Conservative

== Election results ==
=== 2021 election ===
Camborne West and Treswithian
Party	Candidate	Votes	%	±%
Conservative	John Morgan	768	44.2	N/A
Mebyon Kernow	Deborah Fox	469	27.7	N/A
Labour	Daniel Cornell	341	20.2	N/A
Liberal Democrats	Iain MacDonald	133	7.9	N/A
Majority		279	16.5	N/A
Rejected ballots		14	0.8	N/A
Turnout		1,725		N/A
Conservative win (new seat)				
