= Illogan and Portreath (electoral division) =

Electoral division of Cornwall in the UK

- ward Cornwall Council
- Boundary of Illogan and Portreath in Cornwall from 2021.
- County: Cornwall

Current ward
- Created: 2021
- Councillor: David Crabtree (Conservative)
- Number of councillors: One
- Created from: Illogan; Mount Hawke and Portreath

Illogan and Portreath is an electoral division of Cornwall in the United Kingdom which returns one member to sit on Cornwall Council. It was created at the 2021 local elections, being created from the former divisions of Illogan, and Mount Hawke and Portreath. The current councillor is David Crabtree, a member of the Conservative Party.

== Boundaries ==
Illogan and Portreath represents the eastern portion of the parish of Illogan, the entirety of the parish of Portreath, and a small northern portion of the parish of Carn Brea. This includes the villages and hamlets of Cambrose, Illogan, Portreath, and West Tolgus. The electoral division is bounded to the north by the Celtic Sea, to the northeast by the electoral division of St Agnes, to the east by the electoral division of Redruth North, and to the south and west by the electoral division of Pool and Tehidy.

== Councillors ==
Election	Member	Party
2021	David Crabtree	Conservative

== Election results ==
=== 2021 election ===
2021 Cornwall Council election: Illogan and Portreath
Party	Candidate	Votes	%	±%
Conservative	David Crabtree	891	50.7	N/A
Liberal Democrats	David Ekinsmyth (Note: Incumbent councillor, formerly representing Illogan)	614	34.9	N/A
Green	Elizabeth Scully	253	14.4	N/A
Majority		277	15.8	N/A
Rejected ballots		17	1.0	N/A
Turnout		1,775		N/A
Conservative win (new seat)				
