= Camborne Treslothan (electoral division) =

Former electoral division of Cornwall in the UK

- Former ward Cornwall Council
- Boundary of Camborne Treslothan in Cornwall from 2013-2021.
- County: Cornwall

2013–2021
- Number of councillors: One
- Replaced by: Four Lanes, Beacon and Troon
- Created from: Troon and Beacon

Camborne Treslothan (Cornish: Kammbronn Tresulwedhen) was an electoral division of Cornwall in the United Kingdom which returned one member to sit on Cornwall Council between 2013 and 2021. It was abolished at the 2021 local elections, being succeeded by Four Lanes, Beacon and Troon.

== Councillors ==
Election	Member	Party
2013	Robert Webber	Labour
2017	David Atherfold	Conservative
2021	Seat abolished	

== Extent ==
Camborne Treslothan represented the south east part of Camborne (including Pengegon), the villages of Troon, Bolenowe and Knave-Go-By as well as the hamlet of Higher Condurrow. The village of Brea was split between the divisions of Camborne Treslothan and Four Lanes. It covered 891 hectares in total.

== Election results ==
=== 2017 election ===
2017 election: Camborne Treslothan
Party	Candidate	Votes	%	±%
Conservative	David Atherfold	380	40.5	▲25.4
Labour	Paul Farmer	214	22.8	▲3.0
Green	Steve Medlyn	167	17.8	▲11.4
Mebyon Kernow	Alan Sanders	104	11.1	▼5.1
Liberal Democrats	Graham Ford	67	7.1	▲0.3
Majority		166	17.7	▲16.9
Rejected ballots		6	0.6	▲0.6
Turnout		938	30.5	▲2.4
Conservative gain from Labour		Swing		

=== 2013 election ===
2013 election: Camborne Treslothan
Party	Candidate	Votes	%	±%
Labour	Robert Webber	178	19.8	N/A
UKIP	Roy Appleton	171	19.0	N/A
Independent	Nicholas Heather	151	16.8	N/A
Mebyon Kernow	Alan Sanders	146	16.2	N/A
Conservative	Morwenna Williams	136	15.1	N/A
Liberal Democrats	Anna Pascoe	61	6.8	N/A
Green	Jacqueline Merrick	58	6.4	N/A
Majority		7	0.8	N/A
Rejected ballots		0	0.0	N/A
Turnout		901	28.1	N/A
Labour win (new seat)				
