= Camborne Roskear and Tuckingmill (electoral division) =

Electoral division of Cornwall in the UK

- ward Cornwall Council
- Boundary of Camborne Roskear and Tuckingmill in Cornwall from 2021.
- County: Cornwall

Current ward
- Created: 2021
- Councillor: Peter Perry (Conservative)
- Number of councillors: One
- Created from: Camborne Roskear

Camborne Roskear and Tuckingmill is an electoral division of Cornwall in the United Kingdom which returns one member to sit on Cornwall Council. It was created at the 2021 local elections, being created from the former division of Camborne Roskear. The current councillor is Peter Perry, a member of the Conservative Party.

== Boundaries ==
Camborne Roskear and Tuckingmill represents the areas of Roskear, Tuckingmill located in the northeastern portion of the town of Camborne, and a sliver of the western portion of the parish of Carn Brea belonging to the parish ward of Carn Brea - East Hill. It is bordered to the north and east by the division of Pool and Tehidy, to the south by the division of Four Lanes, Beacon and Troon, and to the west by the divisions of Camborne Trelowarren and Camborne West and Treswithian.

== Election results ==
=== 2021 election ===
Camborne Roskear and Tuckingmill
Party	Candidate	Votes	%	±%
Conservative	Peter Perry	456	41.9	N/A
Labour	Kirsty Arthur	288	26.5	N/A
Mebyon Kernow	Ryan Congdon	237	21.8	N/A
Green	Kat Burton	107	9.8	N/A
Majority		168	15.4	N/A
Rejected ballots		7	0.6	N/A
Turnout		1,095		N/A
Conservative win (new seat)				
