= Pool and Tehidy (electoral division) =

Electoral division of Cornwall in the UK

- ward Cornwall Council
- Boundary of Pool and Tehidy in Cornwall from 2021-present.
- County: Cornwall

Current ward
- Created: 2021
- Councillor: Philip Desmonde (Conservative)
- Number of councillors: One
- Created from: Pool and Tehidy

2013–2021
- Number of councillors: One
- Replaced by: Pool and Tehidy
- Created from: Camborne North; Carn Brea South; Carn Brea North (Note: The division only represented a small area of the former Carn Brea North, which was mostly succeeded by Illogan and Redruth North.)

Pool and Tehidy (Cornish: Poll ha Tihydin) is an electoral division of Cornwall in the United Kingdom which returns one member to sit on Cornwall Council. The current councillor is Conservative Philip Desmonde.

The current division is distinct from the division of the same name created in 2013, which was abolished at the 2021 local elections.

== Councillors ==
=== 2013-2021 ===
Election	Member	Party
2013	Malcolm Moyle	Labour
2017	Philip Desmonde	Conservative
2021	Seat abolished	

=== 2021-present ===
Election	Member	Party
2021	Philip Desmonde	Conservative

== 2021-present division ==
=== Extent ===
The current Pool and Tehidy division represents the villages of Pool and Illogan Highway, and the hamlets of South Tehidy, Roscroggan, Tolskithy, and Trevenson. The Tehidy manor is also included in the division, but much of the estate is part of the neighbouring Illogan and Portreath division. The hamlet of Penhallick is shared with the Four Lanes, Beacon and Troon division.

=== Election results ===
==== 2021 election ====
2021 election: Pool and Tehidy
Party	Candidate	Votes	%	±%
Conservative	Philip Desmonde	557	42.4	
Labour	Malcolm Moyle	350	26.6	
Liberal Democrats	Florence Macdonald	241	18.3	
Green	Jasmin Appleby	85	6.5	
Mebyon Kernow	Christopher Lawrence	69	5.2	
Majority		207	15.7	
Rejected ballots		13	1.0	
Turnout		1315	25.6	
Registered electors		5129		
Conservative win (new seat)				

== 2013-2021 division ==
=== Extent ===
Pool and Tehidy represented the village of Pool, and the hamlets of South Tehidy, Roscroggan, and Trevenson. The Tehidy manor was also included in the division, but much of the estate was part of the neighbouring Illogan division. The division covered 697 hectares in total.

=== Election results ===
The boundaries of the Pool and Tehidy division from 2013 to 2021

==== 2017 election ====
2017 election: Pool and Tehidy
Party	Candidate	Votes	%	±%
Conservative	Philip Desmonde	424	40.7	
Liberal Democrats	Tom Goldring	246	23.6	
Labour	Val Kelynack	225	21.6	
UKIP	Michael Pascoe	141	13.5	
Majority		178	17.1	
Rejected ballots		7	0.7	
Turnout		1043	30.6	
Conservative gain from Labour		Swing		

==== 2013 election ====
2013 election: Pool and Tehidy
Party	Candidate	Votes	%	±%
Labour	Malcolm Moyle	344	41.0	
Conservative	Clive Bramley	244	29.0	
UKIP	Brenda Blakeley	242	28.8	
Majority		100	11.9	
Rejected ballots		10	1.2	
Turnout		840	25.9	
Labour win (new seat)				
