= Camborne Treswithian (electoral division) =

Former electoral division of Cornwall in the UK

- Former ward Cornwall Council
- Boundary of Camborne Treswithian in Cornwall from 2013-2021.
- County: Cornwall

2013–2021
- Number of councillors: One
- Replaced by: Camborne West and Treswithian
- Created from: Camborne West

Camborne Treswithian (Cornish: Kammbronn Trevaswedhen) was an electoral division of Cornwall in the United Kingdom which returned one member to sit on Cornwall Council between 2013 and 2021. It was abolished at the 2021 local elections, being succeeded by Camborne West and Treswithian.

== Councillors ==
Election	Member	Party
2013	Viv Lewis	UKIP
2017	David Biggs	Conservative
2021	Seat abolished	

== Extent ==
Camborne Treswithian represented the west of the town of Camborne, including the suburb of Treswithian, as well as the hamlets of Reskadinnick and Kehelland. The division covered 1239 hectares in total.

== Election results ==
=== 2017 election ===
2017 election: Camborne Treswithian
Party	Candidate	Votes	%	±%
Conservative	David Biggs	451	44.7	
Liberal Democrats	Anna Pascoe	237	23.5	
Labour	Dave Wilkins	215	21.3	
Independent	Michael Champion	53	5.3	
Green	Jacqueline Merrick	49	4.9	
Majority		214	21.2	
Rejected ballots		4	0.4	
Turnout		1009	33.9	
Conservative gain from UKIP		Swing		

=== 2013 election ===
2013 election: Camborne Treswithian
Party	Candidate	Votes	%	±%
UKIP	Viv Lewis	232	26.5	
Labour	Steve Richards	220	25.1	
Conservative	Jeff Collins	216	24.7	
Mebyon Kernow	Mike Champion	204	23.3	
Majority		12	1.4	
Rejected ballots		3	0.3	
Turnout		875	28.6	
UKIP win (new seat)				
