= Illogan (electoral division) =

Former electoral division of Cornwall in the UK

- Former ward Cornwall Council
- Boundary of Illogan in Cornwall from 2013-2021.
- County: Cornwall

2013–2021
- Number of councillors: One
- Replaced by: Illogan and Portreath
- Created from: Illogan; Carn Brea North (Note: The reformed Illogan division took part of the former Carn Brea North, which was also shared between Redruth North and Pool and Tehidy.)

2009–2013
- Number of councillors: One
- Replaced by: Illogan
- Created from: Council created

Illogan (Cornish: Egloshalow) was an electoral division of Cornwall in the United Kingdom which returned one member to sit on Cornwall Council between 2009 and 2021. It was abolished at the 2021 local elections, being succeeded by Illogan and Portreath.

== Councillors ==
Election	Member	Party
2009	Terry Wilkins	Conservative
2013	Terry Wilkins	Conservative
2014 by-election	David Ekinsmyth	Liberal Democrat
2017	David Ekinsmyth	Liberal Democrat
2021	Seat abolished	

== Extent ==
Illogan represented the villages of Illogan and West Tolgus, including much of Tehidy Woods. The division was nominally abolished and reconstituted in boundary changes at the 2013 elections, but this had little effect on the ward. Before boundary changes, the division covered 733 hectares in total; afterwards, it covered 793 hectares.

== Election results ==
=== 2017 election ===
2017 election: Illogan
Party	Candidate	Votes	%	±%
Liberal Democrats	David Ekinsmyth	558	42.6	
Independent	Dave Crabtree	359	27.4	
Conservative	Dominic Lonsdale	348	26.6	
Liberal	Jean Pollock	39	3.0	
Majority		199	15.2	
Rejected ballots		6	0.5	
Turnout		1310	35.8	
Liberal Democrats hold		Swing		

=== 2014 by-election ===
2014 by-election: Illogan
Party	Candidate	Votes	%	±%
Liberal Democrats	David Ekinsmyth	277	23.8	
Mebyon Kernow	Stephen Richardson	217	18.6	
Conservative	Adam Desmonde	215	18.4	
UKIP	Clive Polkinghorne	156	13.4	
Labour	Trevor Chalker	129	11.1	
Liberal	Paul Holmes	121	10.4	
Green	Jacqueline Merrick	50	4.3	
Majority		60	5.1	
Rejected ballots		1	0.1	
Turnout		1166	32.4	
Liberal Democrats gain from Conservative		Swing		

=== 2013 election ===
2013 election: Illogan
Party	Candidate	Votes	%	±%
Conservative	Terry Wilkins	331	28.7	
Mebyon Kernow	Stephen Richardson	290	25.1	
UKIP	Don Armstrong	259	22.4	
Liberal Democrats	David Ekinsmyth	157	13.6	
Labour	Linda Moore	113	9.8	
Majority		41	3.6	
Rejected ballots		4	0.3	
Turnout		1154	30.5	
Conservative hold		Swing		

=== 2009 election ===
2009 election: Illogan
Party	Candidate	Votes	%	±%
Conservative	Terry Wilkins	407	32.5	
Liberal	Paul Holmes	318	25.4	
Independent	Graham Ford	312	24.9	
Liberal Democrats	Amanda Mannion	123	9.8	
Labour	Vanessa Fry	81	6.5	
Majority		89	7.1	
Rejected ballots		11	0.9	
Turnout		1252	37.7	
Conservative win (new seat)				
