= Tolgus =

Tolgus may refer to the following places in Cornwall, England:

- Tolgus Mount
- West Tolgus
