= John Harris (poet) =

Cornish poet (1820–1884)

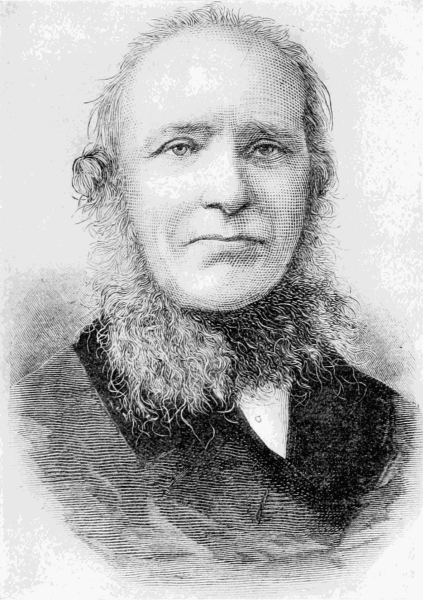
- ...
- Born: 14 October 1820; Bolenowe
- Died: 7 January 1884 (aged 63); Falmouth, Cornwall
- Occupations: Poet and miner
- Spouse: Jane Rule
- Children: two sons and two daughters

John Harris FRHS (14 October 1820 – 7 January 1884) was a Cornish poet. He became a fellow of the Royal Historical Society in April 1879 for being ″distinguished in letters″.

Harris was born and raised in a two-bedroom cottage on the slopes of Bolenowe, a small hamlet near Camborne, Cornwall, in Britain. He was the eldest of nine children (six brothers and two sisters). At age twelve, he was sent to work at Dolcoath mine where he combined a life of painful labour with the production of poetry celebrating his native landscape around Carn Brea and the scenic splendours of Land's End and the Lizard. He could not afford pen and paper, so he improvised and used blackberry juice for ink and grocery bags for paper.

In the 1840s, he married Jane Rule, with whom he had two sons and two daughters. When his second-born daughter, Lucretia, died during Christmas 1855, he produced a moving eulogy. After this a friend found him a more congenial occupation as a Bible-reader or travelling comforter at Falmouth, where he spent the second half of his life. During this period he produced his most important work, the loco-descriptive poem A Story of Carn Brea (1863). Also wrote " The Land's End, Kynance Cove, and other poems". London: Alexander Heylin, 1858.

He received a grant of £200 from the Royal Bounty Fund through the Earl of Beaconsfield and in September 1881 the prime minister gave him a grant of £100 from the civil list. He died in 1884 having requested that he should be buried at Treslothan Chapel, near the village of Troon.

There has been some revival of interest in his work, and recently, the book The Cornish Poet was brought out by the John Harris Society, containing his collected works.

== See also ==
- Culture of Cornwall

== Sources ==
- Newman, Paul (1994) The Meads of Love: the Life & Poetry of John Harris 1820–1884. Redruth: Dyllansow Truran
