= Urban Regeneration Company =

Urban Regeneration Companies are private companies in the United Kingdom which seek to achieve a radical physical transformation of their areas through masterplanning and co-ordinating financial assistance to developers from both the public and private sector.

== The companies ==
- 1st East for Lowestoft and Great Yarmouth
- Bradford Centre Regeneration in Bradford
- Catalyst Corby in Corby
- Central Salford in Salford
- Clyde Gateway in Glasgow
- CPR Regeneration for Camborne, Pool and Redruth in Cornwall
- Derby Cityscape in Derby
- Gloucester Heritage in Gloucester
- Hull Citybuild in Kingston upon Hull
- Leicester Regeneration Company in Leicester
- Liverpool Vision in Liverpool
- New East Manchester in Manchester
- Newport Unlimited in Newport
- Opportunity Peterborough in Peterborough
- ReBlackpool in Blackpool
- Regenco in Sandwell
- Renaissance Southend in Southend
- Sheffield One in Sheffield
- Sunderland Arc in Sunderland
- Tees Valley Regeneration for the Tees Valley
- The New Swindon Company in Swindon
- Walsall Regeneration Company in Walsall
- West Lakes Renaissance for the Lake District.

== Northern Ireland ==
Ilex Urban Regeneration Company Ltd. (ILEX) was an urban regeneration company set up in 2003 by the Northern Ireland Executive, whose role included redevelopment of the Fort George, Ebrington and Rosemount barracks sites in Derry. ILEX closed in 2016 following criticism of its failure to draw on private investment.
