= Heartlands Cornwall =

Former visitor attraction in Pool, Cornwall, UK

Heartlands
- Interactive map of Heartlands
- Theme: Mining and the Cornish diaspora
- Area: 19 acres (7.7 ha)
- Coordinates: 50.22273°N 5.27464°W
- Opened: 20 April 2012
- Closed: 28 February 2024

Heartlands Cornwall, often known simply as Heartlands, is a World Heritage Site Gateway and visitor attraction in Pool, Cornwall, England, UK, in abeyance from 2024. It was dubbed as Cornwall's first free cultural playground. It was developed at South Crofty's Robinson Shaft and spread over 19 acres in the former mining heart of Cornwall.

The project was funded by the National Lottery and was opened on 20 April 2012 after 14 years of planning.

In 2014 the project came close to closure and was forced to reorganise its business plan and reduce its paid staff as a consequence of low visitor numbers and income.

On 5 January 2024, the park announced its closure because of financial difficulties.

The museum, soft play centre, conference centre and café closed the next month but the independent shops remain open as of 25 April 2024.

The Heartlands Trust wound up on 24 April 2024 and sold its assets. In 2026, The National Trust, Cornwall Rural Community Charity, Cornwall Voluntary Sector Forum, local residents, stakeholders and Cornwall Council explored future options for the site. The National Trust was selected as the preferred bidder and was offered a 30-year peppercorn lease, supported by approximately £500,000 from the Community Lottery and £450,000 from Cornwall Council. Subject to successful lease discussions, the National Trust expects to take on the operational management of Heartlands.

== Parkrun ==
A parkrun takes place at Heartlands every Saturday.
