= Broad Lane =

Village in Cornwall, England

Coordinates: 50.2362°N 5.2616°W

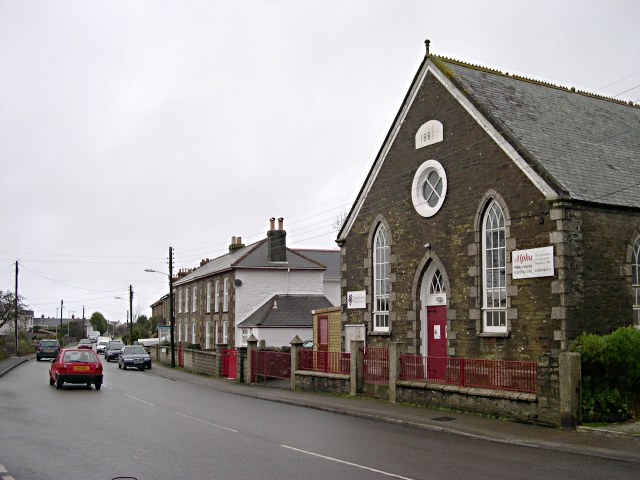
Broad Lane Methodist Chapel

Broad Lane (Cornish: Bownder Ledan) is a hamlet in the civil parish of Carn Brea near Illogan in Cornwall, England, UK. The current Methodist chapel of Broad Lane was built in 1887.
