= Camborne Roskear (electoral division) =

Former electoral division of Cornwall in the UK

- Former ward Cornwall Council
- Boundary of Camborne Roskear in Cornwall from 2013-2021.
- County: Cornwall

2013–2021
- Number of councillors: One
- Replaced by: Camborne Roskear and Tuckingmill
- Created from: Camborne North; Camborne Central; Camborne West
- Number of councillors: One

Camborne Roskear (Cornish: Kammbronn Resker) was an electoral division of Cornwall in the United Kingdom which returned one member to sit on Cornwall Council between 2013 and 2021. It was abolished at the 2021 local elections, being succeeded by Camborne Roskear and Tuckingmill.

== Councillors ==
| Election | Member | Party |
|---|---|---|
| 2013 | Paul White | Conservative |
| 2017 | Paul White | Independent |
| 2021 | Seat abolished | |

== Extent ==
Camborne Roskear represented the north of the town of Camborne, as well as the area of Treverno and part of Tuckingmill (which is shared with the Pool and Tehidy and Camborne Trelowarren divisions). The division covered 186 hectares in total.

== Election results ==
=== 2017 election ===
2017 election: Camborne Roskear
| Party | Candidate | Votes | % | ±% |
|---|---|---|---|---|
| Independent | Paul White | 668 | 55.7 | |
| Conservative | Maurice Pascoe | 304 | 25.4 | |
| Liberal Democrats | Roger Richards | 116 | 9.7 | |
| Mebyon Kernow | Linda Lemon | 102 | 8.5 | |
| Majority | | 364 | 30.4 | |
| Rejected ballots | | 9 | 0.8 | |
| Turnout | | 1199 | 33.2 | |
| Independent gain from Conservative | | Swing | | |

=== 2013 election ===
2013 election: Camborne Roskear
| Party | Candidate | Votes | % | ±% |
|---|---|---|---|---|
| Conservative | Paul White | 475 | 38.9 | |
| Labour Co-op | Jude Robinson | 435 | 35.6 | |
| UKIP | Tess Hulland | 237 | 19.4 | |
| Mebyon Kernow | John Rowe | 68 | 5.6 | |
| Majority | | 40 | 3.3 | |
| Rejected ballots | | 6 | 0.5 | |
| Turnout | | 1221 | 35.3 | |
| Conservative win (new seat) | | | | |
