= Stonebridge Park, Liverpool =

Business park in Liverpool, England

Coordinates: 53.462°N 2.882°W

Stonebridge Park is a new business park under construction in Gillmoss on the outskirts of Liverpool, created by St. Modwen Properties with the help of Liverpool Vision. The park lies close to the East Lancs Road the A580 road on the border of the Fazakerley and Croxteth areas of the city.
