= Camborne Trelowarren (electoral division) =

Electoral division of Cornwall in the UK

- ward Cornwall Council
- Boundary of Camborne Trelowarren in Cornwall from 2021.
- County: Cornwall

Current ward
- Created: 2021
- Councillor: Paul White (Independent)
- Number of councillors: One
- Created from: Camborne Trelowarren

2013–2021
- Number of councillors: One
- Replaced by: Camborne Trelowarren

Camborne Trelowarren (Cornish: Kammbronn Treleweren) is an electoral division of Cornwall in the United Kingdom and returns one member to sit on Cornwall Council. The current Councillor is Paul White, an Independent. The current division is distinct from that of the same name used from 2013 to 2021, after boundary changes at the 2021 local elections.

== Councillors ==
=== 2013-2021 ===
Election	Member	Party
2013	Jon Stoneman	Conservative
2017	Jeff Collins	Conservative
2019 (?)	Jeff Collins	Independent (Note: Collins was elected as a Conservative, and was reported as one until at least November 2019, but later sat as a standalone Independent.)
2021	Seat abolished	

=== 2021-present ===
Election	Member	Party
2021	Paul White	Independent

== 2021-present division ==
=== Extent ===
The current division represents the centre and south of the town of Camborne.

=== Election results ===
==== 2021 election ====
2021 election: Camborne Trelowarren
Party	Candidate	Votes	%	±%
Independent	Paul White (Note: Incumbent councillor for the former division of Camborne Roskear)	718	44.8	
Conservative	David Atherfold (Note: Incumbent councillor for the former division of Camborne Treslothan)	380	23.7	
Labour Co-op	John Cosgrove	276	17.2	
Mebyon Kernow	Phili Mills	97	6.1	
Green	Nigel Miles	86	5.4	
Liberal Democrats	Geoffrey Williams	37	2.3	
Majority		338	21.1	
Rejected ballots		9	0.6	
Turnout		1603	34.0	
Registered electors		4710		
Independent win (new seat)				

== 2013-2021 division ==
Map of the 2013-2021 division shown within Cornwall (click to zoom in)

=== Extent ===
The former division represented the centre and east of the town of Camborne, as well as part of Tuckingmill (which is shared with the Pool and Tehidy and Camborne Roskear divisions), covering 110 hectares in total.

=== Election results ===
==== 2017 election ====
2017 election: Camborne Trelowarren
Party	Candidate	Votes	%	±%
Conservative	Jeff Collins	197	21.4	
Labour	Geoffrey Guffogg	194	21.1	
Mebyon Kernow	Zoe Fox	192	20.8	
Independent	Val Dalley	169	18.3	
Independent	Jon Stoneman	126	13.7	
Liberal Democrats	Geoff Williams	40	4.3	
Majority		3	0.3	
Rejected ballots		3	0.3	
Turnout		921	27.1	
Conservative hold		Swing		

==== 2013 election ====
2013 election: Camborne Trelowarren
Party	Candidate	Votes	%	±%
Conservative	Jon Stoneman	243	29.9	
UKIP	Roger Laity	225	27.7	
Labour	Adam Crickett	197	24.2	
Mebyon Kernow	Zoe Fox	104	12.8	
Green	David Everett	34	4.2	
Majority		18	2.2	
Rejected ballots		10	1.2	
Turnout		813	23.9	
Conservative win (new seat)				
