= Bosleake =

Coordinates: 50.2145°N 5.2624°W

- Location within Cornwall
- OS grid reference: SW674401
- Shire county: Cornwall
- Region: South West
- Country: England
- Sovereign state: United Kingdom
- Post town: Redruth
- Postcode district: TR14
- Police: Devon and Cornwall
- Fire: Cornwall
- Ambulance: South Western

Bosleake is a mining hamlet southwest of Redruth in west Cornwall, England, UK. It is in the civil parish of Carn Brea.
