= Grillis =

Coordinates: 50.204°N 5.255°W

Grillis: Cornish: Grylles
- Location within Cornwall
- OS grid reference: SW678389
- Civil parish: Carn Brea
- Unitary authority: Cornwall
- Ceremonial county: Cornwall
- Region: South West
- Country: England
- Sovereign state: United Kingdom
- Post town: Redruth
- Postcode district: TR16

Grillis (Cornish: Grylles) is a hamlet in the parish of Carn Brea, Cornwall, England.
