= Trevenson =

English building

Coordinates: 50.230°N 5.273°W

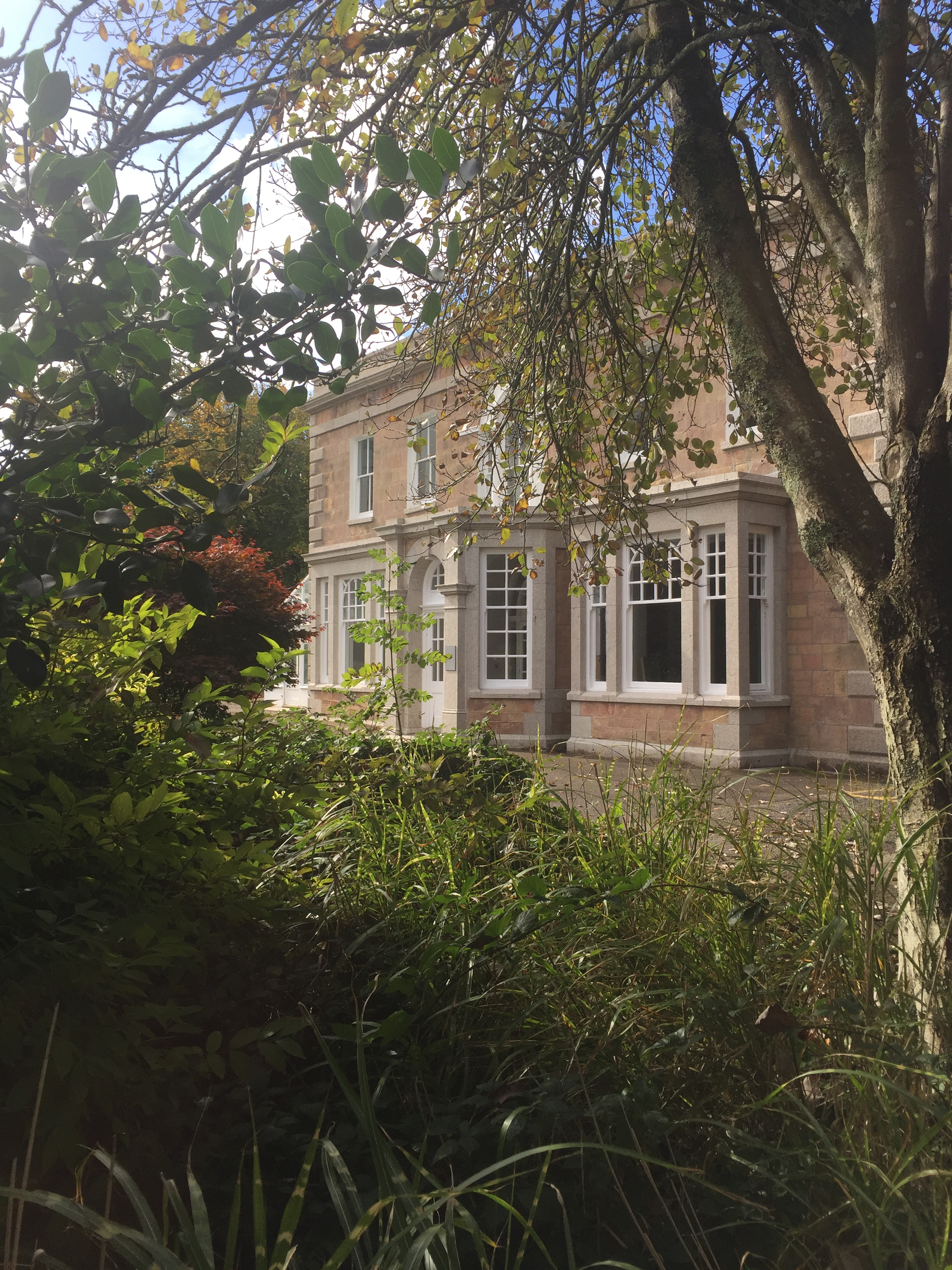
Trevenson House 2018

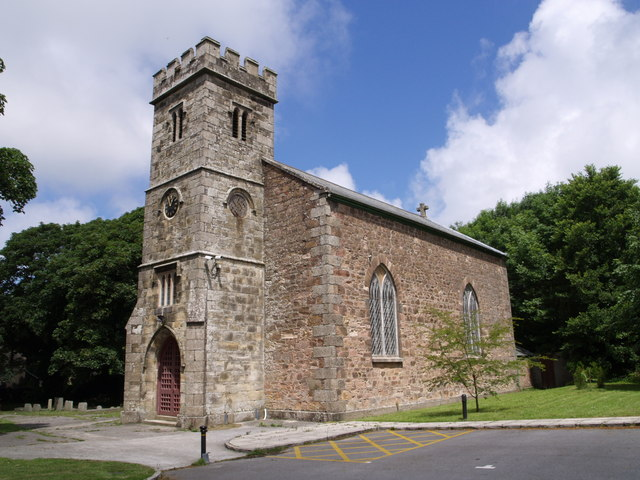
Trevenson Chapel, Church of England

Map showing the location of Trevenson within Cornwall

Trevenson (Cornish: Trevensyn) is in the parish of Carn Brea, between the towns of Camborne and Redruth in Cornwall, United Kingdom.

== Trevenson House ==
Trevenson House was built in 1797 for Thomas Kevill, a steward of the Tehidy estate and replaced an earlier house on the site. Trevenson House is a Grade II listed building. Further information regarding the history can be found here. It is now part of iCT4 Limited being run as serviced offices and conferencing facilities for the community.

== Trevenson Chapel ==
Tevenson Chapel was built in 1806–09 as a Church of England chapel-of-ease in the parish of Illogan. The chapel has a thin castellated west tower; the pointed windows are of granite with cast iron tracery. This tracery has been replaced with modern replicas.

== Education ==
The area is home to Cornwall College, an A level centre and Pool School. Trevenson used to be home to the Camborne School of Mines between 1970 and 2004. It has since moved to a new campus in Penryn called Tremough.

== Cornish wrestling ==
Trevenson Park was the venue for Cornish wrestling tournaments for prizes including the Interceltic games in 1929.
