= Pengegon =

Area of Camborne, Cornwall, England

Coordinates: 50.211°N 5.287°W

Pengegon (Cornish: Penn an Gegin) is a residential area east of Camborne, Cornwall, England, which has a fish and chip shop and a playground. From 2013 to 2021, Pengegon was included in the Camborne Treslothan division on Cornwall Council. After boundary changes at the 2021 local elections, it was placed in the new Four Lanes, Beacon and Troon division.
