= South Crofty =

Tin and copper mine in Cornwall, England

South Crofty Hwel Krofti Soth
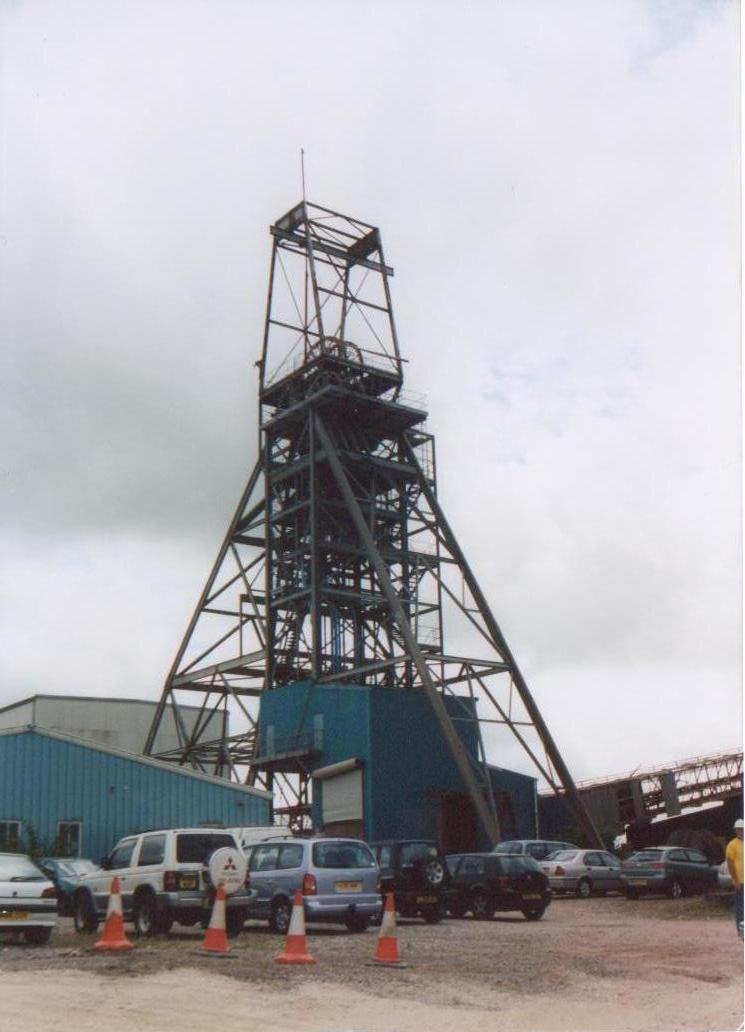
- New Cooks Kitchen Shaft

- Location in Cornwall
- Location: Pool, Cornwall, United Kingdom; 50°13′22″N 5°16′29″W
- Products: Tin, copper
- Opened: 16th century
- Closed: 1998
- Company: Cornish Metals Inc

South Crofty (Cornish: Hwel Krofti Soth) is a metalliferous tin and copper mine located in the village of Pool, Cornwall, England. An ancient mine, it has seen production for over 400 years, and extends almost two and a half miles across and 3,000 feet (910 m) down and has mined over 40 lodes. Evidence of mining activity in South Crofty has been dated back to 1592, with full-scale mining beginning in the mid-17th century. The mine went into serious decline after 1985 and eventually closed in 1998. After several changes of ownership, South Crofty is owned by Cornish Metals, which is working to re-open the mine, as of November 2022, having received a permit for dewatering the mine.

== History ==
South Crofty Mine, at Pool between Camborne and Redruth, is an ancient tin mine. For several centuries its shallow workings exploited copper rather than the deeper tin mineralisation. References implying mining, rather than streaming, occur in the area as early as 1592, and clearly by the mid-17th century mining was well established. During this period part of the mine which today is known as South Crofty was then called Penhellick Vean. The first really significant developments came in 1710 when Francis Bassett obtained a lease of Penhellick Vean and a drainage adit was begun. Over the next twenty years these shallow workings (less than 40 metres or 130 feet deep) produced copper of great value and made the fortune of the Bassett family. Following the opening of the numerous copper mines on Anglesey, which occurred in the 1770-1780 period, most of the mines around South Crofty closed down.

=== 19th century ===
By 1822, copper ore was being raised at a new mine in the area, East Wheal Crofty, which by 1833 included Penhellick Vean. Mining depths were now 80 metres (260 ft) or more, and throughout the 1830s a substantial investment was undertaken to improve the mine including a rail link; so much that by 1842 East Wheal Crofty was regarded as a 'model' mine. This state of affairs did not last however, and by 1863 part of the property was for sale. The remainder of the mine, now at least 210 metres (690 ft) deep, was renamed South Wheal Crofty which, with the deletion of 'Wheal', has been the name ever since.

The mine now faced one of its most far-reaching changes. In the 1860s, South Wheal Crofty was still almost entirely a copper mine but by 1873, after a substantial investment in new dressing machinery, the mine was - financially at least - dependent upon tin. Copper remained significant until 1880, when shallow reserves were exhausted. The mine was now operating at the 260-fathom (1,560 ft; 480 m) level, where only tin was found. The collapse of the tin price affected South Wheal Crofty both directly (loss of revenue) and indirectly, via increased pumping costs as neighbouring mines closed down. In February 1896 mining was suspended and the mine flooded.

In 1899, further backing was obtained and South Crofty gradually reopened, and acquired the adjacent New Cooks Kitchen mine. Improvements were made in the mine and the deepening of Robinsons Shaft commenced in 1903. The mine returned to profit and in 1906 a new era began, with the incorporation of South Crofty Limited.

=== 20th century ===
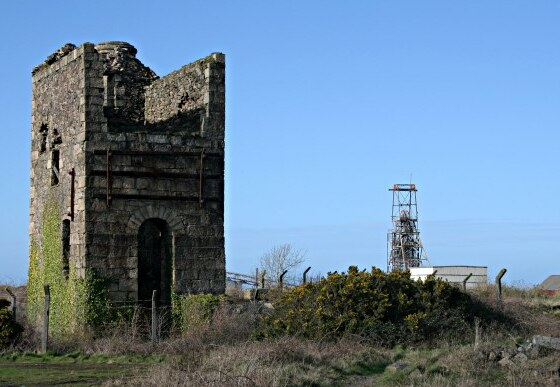
Old and New Cook's Kitchen Shafts headgear, 2007 photo

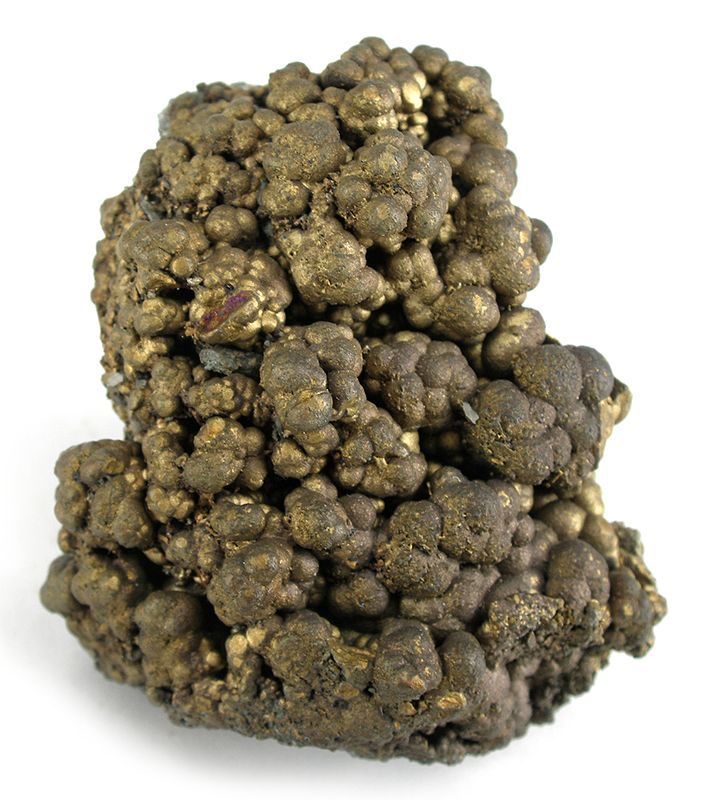
Chalcopyrite mineralization, from Cook's Kitchen Mine, Carn Brea and Tincroft United Mine

By 1908, the Robinsons Shaft had been sunk to the 205-fathom (1,230 ft; 375 m) level and work had begun on a second new shaft at New Cooks Kitchen. Increasing use was made of rock drills and, by 1910, the mine operated profitably hoisting 60,000 tons of ore annually. By 1914, the works were down to 310 fathoms (1,860 ft; 570 m).

For the next 70 years South Crofty continued to modernise and expand. As nearby mines closed, they were acquired by South Crofty to supplement its ore reserves at depth. The major purchase was of Dolcoath mine in 1936. Ore production, which had not exceeded 75,000 tons a year since 1906, was increased to 92,000 tons in 1959 following improvements in both mine and mill. Production exceeded 100,000 tons in 1968 for the first time.

Black tin production was steady at between 500 and 800 tons a year from 1907 to 1956, excluding a break in production during the tin price slump of the early 1920s. Wolframite and arsenic was also produced at the mine, the former accounting for around 50 tons to 150 tons between 1907 and 1956, and the latter between 500 tons and 1000 tons between 1907 and 1919, declining to 100 tons by 1956.

In 1967, South Crofty Ltd became a wholly owned subsidiary of Siamese Tin Syndicate Ltd and Siamese Tin's subsidiary, St Piran Ltd. This change of ownership was the start, in 1969, of a £1 million programme to increase ore hoisting capacity and to make substantial improvements to the mill. By 1975 the mill was processing more than 200,000 tonnes of ore (including some from Pendarves mine) to yield around 1,500 tonnes of tin concentrate.

In mid-1982, the company was acquired from St Piran by Charter Consolidated, which subsequently disposed of 40% of its holdings to Rio Tinto Zinc (RTZ). These holdings were vested in a new holding company, Wheal Crofty Holdings Ltd, with the same balance of ownership. Then in 1984 RTZ acquired Charter's 60% interest and South Crofty became part of Carnon Consolidated Ltd.

In October 1985, the price of tin dropped dramatically on the world markets following the collapse of the International Tin Agreement. Carnon rationalised the operations, involving closure of the Pendarves mine which had supplied ore to the South Crofty mill. With a diminishing ore supply, this mill was progressively shut and by 1988 all South Crofty ore was trucked for processing at Wheal Jane.

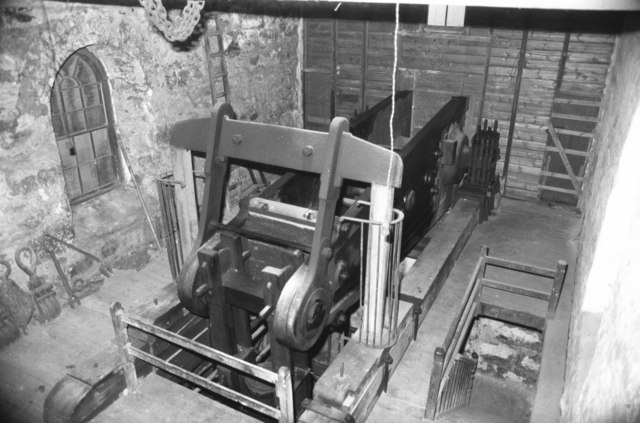
Robinson's 80" engine, South Crofty Mine

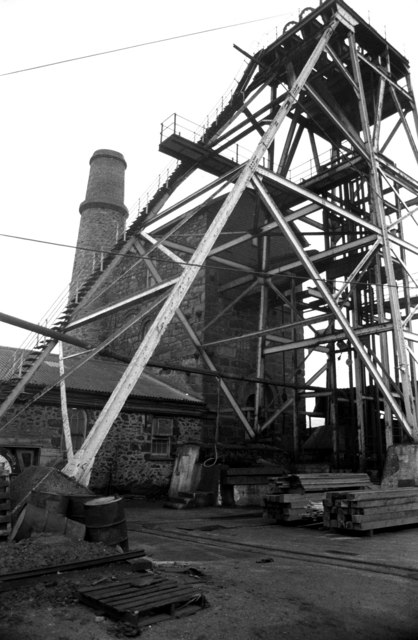
Robinson's Shaft, South Crofty

As well as a reduction in manpower, the mines were rationalised and a programme of modernisation, started by RTZ before the price crash, was stepped up. This was made possible by the co-operation and financial support of the Department of Trade and Industry (DTI) in the form of loans for the capital improvement. The majority of this capital was put into the South Crofty mine. In addition, RTZ also provided a loan to fund the operating losses.

Carnon became privately owned in June 1988 when the business and assets of the group were purchased from RTZ through a management buy-out. A trust was established for the benefit of the employees who received twenty per cent of the equity. Carnon Holdings Limited, was incorporated at this time.

In February 1991 the DTI stopped support of capital projects. The company substantially reduced labour costs which coupled with a small rise in the tin price allowed the mine to continue operating at a small loss. The losses were funded through the sale of surplus land and redundant assets. The mine produced about 1,900 tons of black tin in 1993 which was shipped to a smelter in Malaysia. In 1994 South Crofty was purchased by Crew Natural Resources of Canada; at this time the mines' identified and inferred reserves were expected to allow it to continue working for at least ten years. The New Roskear shaft took over from the Robinson Shaft as the secondary access shaft of access.

However, after several more years of depressed tin prices, South Crofty Ltd announced in August 1997 that closure was imminent, and after further attempts at the time to keep the mine open, closure was completed by March 1998.

=== 21st century ===
In March 2001, a new locally formed company named Baseresult Holdings Ltd. bought the mine with the stated aim of re-opening it. In the same year the company started refurbishment of the New Cooks Kitchen section of the mine. By 2003 an underground refurbishment of the Tuckingmill Decline and Old Engine shaft was under way, and later that year access was mined into New Cooks Kitchen Deep Adit level from the Tuckingmill Decline. The refurbishment of the New Cooks Kitchen section was completed in October 2003 and opened to the public for tours.

In 2004, mining commenced at the 10-fathom (60 ft; 18 m) level drilling a crosscut north from the Tuckingmill Decline to New Cooks Kitchen Shaft. In 2006, equipment from the dormant Wheal Jane processing plant was purchased, and although some of this was outdated, it was planned that some elements would be refurbished at South Crofty to be used in the new mill adjacent to the decline entrance.

Local support for the mine was mixed, although nearly 2,000 people attended an Open Day in support of the mine on 8 July 2006. However others, including local councillor and former miner Mark Kaczmarek, believed that it was time to redevelop the site. A local regeneration company, CPR Regeneration, set up in 2001, actively opposed the reopening of the mine. CPR wished to develop the South Crofty site, initially for a leisure centre, but latterly for a housing and business park. In 2003, 2006, and 2007 CPR threatened Baseresult with a Compulsory Purchase Order of the site.

South Crofty cited the reason for delays in re-commencing mining as the repeated demand by Cornwall Council for Review of Mineral Planning Permissions (ROMPs), which the Council first requested in 2002. After three further reviews submitted by Baseresult in 2002, 2004 and 2005, the Council finally granted permission for the mine in September 2006. One month later CPR Regeneration announced that they would be applying for a Compulsory Purchase Order, and published plans for a multimillion-pound development of 150 acres (0.61 km^{2}) including the South Crofty site. However, by March 2012, CPR Regeneration had ceased operational activity.

In November 2007, a new company named Western United Mines Limited was formed to own and operate the mine. The previous owner of the mine, Baseresult Holdings Ltd. was the majority shareholder of the new company alongside Casserite LP, an investment vehicle acting for Galena Asset Management, a subsidiary of commodity trading company Trafigura. By this time the mine was employing 26 people and total capital investment to re-open the mine was forecast to reach £9 million by June 2008, with the anticipation of its reopening at the end of 2009 after further investment of £50 million. The owners of the mine stated that it had the "potential for a mining life of eighty years".

On 28 November 2007, the owners of the mine successfully challenged the regeneration plan developed by Kerrier District Council for the area around the surface workings. Crofty Developments Ltd., a partner of Western United Mines appealed to the High Court on the basis that it had not been involved in the consultation process.

The price of tin increased from below $4,000/tonne in 2002 to over $17,000/tonne in March 2010, and the economic viability of the South Crofty mine, with identified and inferred reserves of about 50,000 tonnes of tin (in 1994) had improved considerably.

In May 2011, a Canadian company, Celeste Copper Corporation, entered into an earn-in agreement to acquire up to a 100% interest of the property and assets of the mine.

By 2012, the area covered by South Crofty extended over the setts of some 34 former mines, and Celeste Copper Corporation estimated that there were about 7.95 million tonnes of tin in the mine, valued at £1.5 billion ($2.4 billion). The company said it planned to start pumping out the shallower workings in the Dolcoath section in 2013 at a cost of £2.6 million. However, in November 2012, UNESCO called for a halt on work to reopen the mine until "an assessment had been made of the project's impact" because it said it had not been consulted before planning consent was granted in 2011. South Crofty is located within the Cornwall and West Devon Mining Landscape which had been designated as a World Heritage Site by UNESCO in 2006.

In June 2013 the South Crofty site was placed into administration.

In October 2015 a local newspaper again raised the idea that the mine could be reopened.

In March 2016 it was revealed that the Canadian company Strongbow Exploration had acquired, from administration, a 100% interest in the South Crofty Tin Project and associated mineral rights in Cornwall.

In April 2017 Strongbow announced that it has filed an NI 43-101 Technical Report and Preliminary Economic Assessment for the South Crofty mine.

In October 2017, following successful water treatment trials, Strongbow announced that it had received a dewatering permit from the UK Environment Agency allowing the discharge of up to 25,000 cubic metres of treated water per day into the Red River. The granting of this permit means South Crofty is fully permitted to work towards a production decision. By early 2018 the funding was in place for the construction of a water treatment plant with work commencing that spring. Test drilling commenced in June 2020, and the next month Strongbow was renamed as Cornish Metals Inc. The price of tin recovered since the mine closed and in January 2025 the British government announced a £28.6m investment to support its reopening.

== Cornish Wrestling ==
Cornish wrestling tournaments were held at South Crofty Mine for prizes.

== Mineral Statistics ==
From Robert Hunt's Mineral Statistics of the United Kingdom.

Tin Production (1855-1996)
Year(s)	Black (Tons)	Value (£)
1855	1.90	87.60
1856	0.30	16.00
1857	0.80	56.60
1858	4.10	226.20
1859	..	204.80
1860	1.70	107.30
1861	0.80	47.60
1862	1.90	93.80
1863	1.70	282.50
1864	1.30	904.30
1865	2.30	1,008.40
1866	1.00	227.70
1867	5.60	755.60
1868	4.80	1,179.00
1869	7.40	2,056.20
1870	10.70	3,144.40
1871	18.00	6,471.60
1872	63.60	7,030.50
1873	207.00	14,188.80
1874	180.30	8,624.80
1875	163.40	7,182.60
1876	144.20	5,397.30
1877	136.60	1,070.40
1878	173.50	6,120.00
1879	1.20	1,346.00
1880	..	1,138.00
1881	117.70	6,076.00
1882	120.30	6,977.00
1883	154.40	7,505.00
1884	169.60	7,143.00
1885	91.80	4,073.00
1886	99.00	5,402.00
1887	125.30	7,967.00
1888	125.50	8,248.00
1889	122.10	6,673.00
1890	147.40	8,152.00
1891	184.80	9,900.00
1892	203.10	11,107.00
1893	258.80	13,313.00
1894	307.00	13,148.00
1895	251.00	10,001.00
1896	34.00	1,083.00
1898	..	72.00
1899	..	142.00
1900	4.20	306.00
1901	158.40	10,758.00
1902	296.00	21,831.00
1903	348.60	27,341.00
1904	275.30	20,272.00
1905	291.40	22,397.00
1906	153.80	14,606.00
1907	228.50	22,530.00
1908	434.10	33,554.00
1908	432.00	..
1909	682.80	52,421.00
1909	696.00	..
1910	631.50	56,619.00
1910	630.00	..
1911	677.60	76,234.00
1911	677.00	..
1912	624.80	81,562.00
1912	628.00	..
1913	629.40	78,612.00
1913	633.00	..
1914	581.90	53,045.00
1914	644.00	..
1915	690.40	64,884.00
1915	628.00	..
1916	696.50	63,325.00
1916	607.00	..
1917	695.10	83,781.00
1917	610.00	..
1918	625.15	114,092.00
1918	581.00	..
1919	546.00	77,724.00
1919	546.00	..
1920	589.00	..
1923	406.00	..
1924	669.00	..
1925	746.00	..
1926	694.00	..
1927	808.00	..
1928	795.00	..
1929	795.00	..
1930	670.00	..
1931	113.00	..
1932	645.00	..
1933	645.00	..
1934	643.00	..
1935	673.00	..
1936	677.00	..
1937-1938	no-details	..
1940	no-details	..
1941	728.00	..
1942	633.00	..
1944	711.00	..
1945	no-details	..
1948	no-details	..
1950	no-details	..
1961-1969	no-details	..
1970	1,110.00	..
1971	1,195.00	..
1972	1,571.00	..
1974	954.00	..
1975	1,424.00	..
1976	2,200.00	..
1977	1,553.00	..
1978	1,536.00	..
1980	no-details	..
1983	1,308.00	..
1984	1,817.00	..
1985	no-details	..
1992	2,044.30	..
1993	2,235.50	..
1994	1,918.70	..
1995	2,304.00	..
1996	2,255.00	.
Total	57294.85	1171844

Employment (1878-1996)
Year(s)	Total	Overground	Underground
1878	202	113	89
1879	65	23	42
1880	97	45	52
1881	122	55	67
1882	149	69	80
1883	163	71	92
1884	160	76	84
1885	101	49	52
1886	122	66	56
1887	142	68	74
1888	131	64	67
1889	127	62	65
1890	134	61	73
1891	145	64	81
1892	170	74	96
1893	223	81	142
1894	200	75	125
1895	156	68	88
1896	13	6	7
1897	14	7	7
1898	3	3	..
1899	5	4	1
1900	73	48	25
1901	183	90	93
1902	226	97	129
1903	289	126	163
1904	312	123	189
1905	290	118	172
1906	322	144	178
1907	476	222	254
1908	510	240	270
1909	567	240	327
1910	553	221	332
1911	583	207	376
1912	622	242	380
1913	620	245	375
1914	592	..	..
1914	594	241	353
1915	548	..	..
1915	548	227	321
1916	525	..	..
1916	527	229	298
1917	519	..	..
1917	511	218	293
1918	464	215	249
1918	464	215	249
1919	482	230	252
1919	482	226	256
1920	471	226	245
1921	109	64	45
1922	144	105	39
1923	336	171	165
1924	439	217	222
1925	446	222	224
1926	440	213	227
1927	442	207	235
1928	456	207	249
1929	454	207	247
1930	340	170	170
1931	113	69	44
1932	275	144	131
1933	296	151	145
1934	337	163	174
1935	369	172	197
1936	385	176	209
1937	410	191	219
1938	433	194	239
1940	392	193	199
1941	345	196	149
1942	371	189	182
1943	427	198	229
1944	438	207	231
1945	403	221	182
1948	331	209	122
1950	331	209	122
1975	601	..	..
1976	677	..	..
1977	697	..	..
1978	677	..	..
1979	677	..	..
1980	608	..	..
1981	624	..	..
1982	590	..	..
1992	212	..	..
1993	244	..	..
1994	275	..	..
1995	324	..	..
1996	270	..	..

== See also ==
- Mining in Cornwall and Devon
- Camborne School of Mines
- Wheal Jane
- Geevor Tin Mine
- Wheal Vor
