= Liverpool Vision =

Former economic development company

Coordinates: 53°24′34.2″N 2°59′41.8″W

- Type: Economic Development Company
- Founded: 1999
- Founder: English Partnerships, Liverpool City Council, NWDA, Various Private Sector Leaders with an interest in Liverpool
- Defunct: 2018
- Fate: Role absorbed by Liverpool City Council
- Headquarters: Liverpool, England
- Key people: First Chairman Sir Joe Dwyer, Deputy Chairman Mike Story and First CEO Dr Layth Bunni. Other Board members included Alan Middleton and Sir Terry Leahy. Mike Parker (Chairman), Max Steinberg (Chief Executive)

Liverpool Vision was an Economic Development Company based in Liverpool, England. Set up in 1999, Liverpool Vision was the first Urban Regeneration Company to be founded in the United Kingdom and was tasked with leading the physical transformation of the city into the new millennium. In 2008, a re-organisation of Liverpool Vision saw its operations as a URC merged with both the Liverpool Land Development Company and Business Liverpool to form a single Economic Development Company within Liverpool. Liverpool Vision also offered business support. Liverpool Vision led the Liverpool at World Expo in Shanghai 2010 project.

It was announced in November 2018 that Liverpool Vision was being closed down. Most, but not all, Liverpool Vision staff transferred to the Liverpool City Council to carry on their work.

== Projects ==
Liverpool Vision has spearheaded many urban developments within Liverpool, including:

- Baltic Triangle
- Commercial District
- Echo Arena Liverpool
- FACT
- Lime Street Gateway
- Liverpool ONE
- LJMU Art and Design Academy
- Metquarter
- Museum of Liverpool
- Prince's Dock
- RopeWalks
- Stonebridge Park
