= CPR Regeneration =

CPR Regeneration was an Urban Regeneration Company (URC) set up to help redevelop Camborne, Pool and Redruth in Cornwall, England, UK. From 2002 to 2012 it worked with private and public sector organisations and undertook a range of physical and business-related work that sought to increase the quality of the built environment, assist in supporting existing businesses and secure further employment opportunities for the area. Notable works included: the development of the Pool Innovation Centre and numerous local infrastructure schemes to enable later development. The company was one of 19 URCs that existed in the UK in the early noughties, each designed to address problems in areas of severe industrial decline or with structural problems that prejudiced the ability of an area to be economically sustainable. URCs are not designed to be a permanent feature of the area in which they work, and are created to tackle specific projects. The Camborne, Pool and Redruth area contains a significant portion of the county's industrial activity. The area had suffered from the decline of copper and tin mining (and related industries) and has struggled to recover. The setting up of a URC was significant for the area, since it recognised of the needs of a largely urban and industrial area within the bounds of Cornwall, and of the contribution these towns make to the Cornish economy.
