= Carn Brea Castle (1824 ship) =

British merchant ship

History

United Kingdom
- Name: Carn Brea Castle
- Namesake: Carn Brea Castle
- Owner: Messrs. Huddart Brothers
- Builder: Wigram's & Green, Blackwall Yard.
- Yard number: 192
- Launched: 5 May 1824
- Fate: Wrecked 5 July 1829

General characteristics
- Tons burthen: 589, or 58962/94, or 57081/94 (bm)

Carn Brea Castle was an East Indiaman, launched on the Thames in 1824 and built to carry passengers to Bengal. She was wrecked on 5 July 1829 on the Isle of Wight, outbound from Portsmouth to Calcutta.

== Career ==
Carn Brea Castle was a new type of ship. Wigram's & Green built her for Huddart Brothers to a design by Captain Huddart. In 1813 the British East India Company (EIC) had lost its monopoly on the trade between India and Britain. British ships were then free to sail to India or the Indian Ocean under a licence from the EIC. Carn Brea Castle had been built expressly to carry passengers to Calcutta, sailing under a license from the EIC.

Carn Brea Castle first appeared in Lloyd's Register (LR) in 1824.

Year	Master	Owner	Trade	Source & notes
1824	T.Davey	Cotton & Co.	London–Calcutta	LR; galvanised 1824
1829	T.Davey; Barber	Cotton & Co.	London–Calcutta	LR

== Loss ==
Carn Brea Castle, James Barber, master, left Portsmouth on 5 July 1829, bound for Calcutta. She was lost that afternoon in Freshwater Bay, Isle of Wight, by standing too close in to the land. Her captain and passengers were at dinner when she struck.

Carn Brea Castle struck rocks on 5 July 1829 off Sudmore Point, Isle of Wight. She was refloated but came ashore at "Metteston" (Mattisone) and was wrecked. All on board were rescued. "Cambria Castle" was on a voyage from Portsmouth to Calcutta.

Lieutenant Josiah Donford, RN, of the Coast Guard station at Freshwater, and five men proceeded to help rescue the passengers. On 4 August the passengers transmitted to Lieutenant Donford a silver salver as a token of their appreciation for his efforts.

Some records report that one life was lost. This happened on 6 July when one of Carn Brea Castle's boats, with three men aboard, capsized as the men were attempting to get an anchor out.

Carn Brea Castle finally broke up on 22 August.
