= Condurrite =

General
- Category: Minerals

Condurrite is a name given to a mixture of cuprite, domeykite and tenorite. It takes its name from the Great Condurrow Mine at Troon, Cornwall in the United Kingdom, which is regarded as the type locality.
