= Blowinghouse =

Two settlements in Cornwall

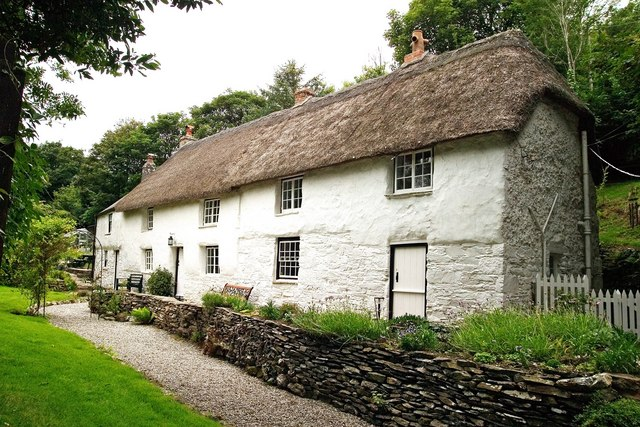
Harmony Cot, Blowinghouse near Trevellas

Blowinghouse is the name of two settlements in Cornwall, England, United Kingdom. ("Blowing house" is an old name for a smelting house.)

- Blowinghouse hamlet in north Cornwall is situated near to Trevellas, midway between St Agnes and Perranporth. 50.31911°N 5.16623°W.
- Blowinghouse in west Cornwall is a residential area situated on the western outskirts of Redruth. 50.23067°N 5.24535°W.
