= Pool, Cornwall =

Village in west Cornwall, England

Coordinates: 50.228°N 5.266°W

Pool
- Parish
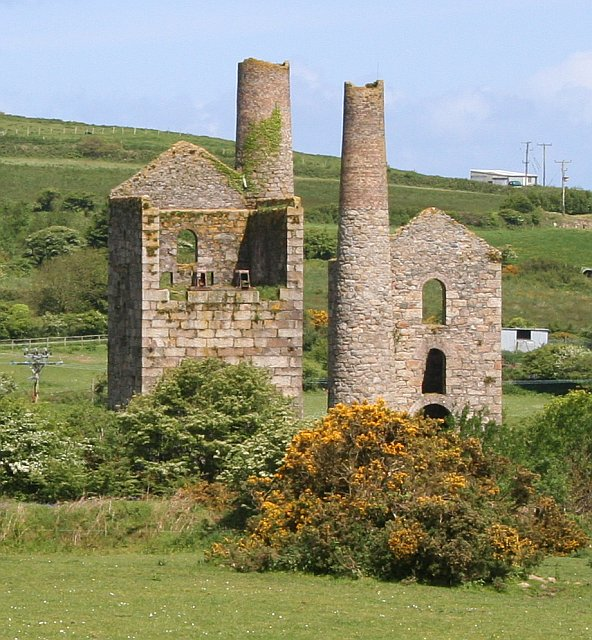
- Two engine houses of the Grenville United Mine.
- Interactive map of Pool
- Shire county: Cornwall
- Region: South West
- Country: England
- Sovereign state: United Kingdom
- Police: Devon and Cornwall
- Fire: Cornwall
- Ambulance: South Western

Pool (Cornish: Poll) is a village in Carn Brea civil parish in west Cornwall, England. It is bypassed by the A30, on the A3047 between Camborne and Redruth, between Tuckingmill and Illogan Highway.

== Facilities ==
Shops in the village include: a Tesco Extra, on the site of Heathcoat's textile factory; a Morrisons on the site of the Flamingo Ballroom; and a B&Q DIY Store, on the site of Holman's Climax factory. Local businesses include Pool Market, a weekend market stall operation; and Macsalvors which specialises in factory clearance and sells goods ranging from chandlery, building tools and material, new and used office furniture, etc.

Pool is part of the ecclesiastical parish of Illogan, and part of the civil parish of Carn Brea. Trevenson Church is the village's Church of England place of worship.

Other facilities include Pool Health Centre; Carn Brea Leisure Centre (the first leisure centre in Cornwall to be run as a charitable trust); Heartlands, a 19-acre (8 ha) visitor attraction and World Heritage Site, based around South Crofty's Robinson's Shaft; and East Pool mine, another industrial heritage centre, consisting of one of the largest surviving Cornish beam engines at Taylor's Shaft, and a restored winding engine at Michell's Shaft.

== Transport ==
The nearest railway stations are at Redruth and Camborne on the Cornish Main Line. Carn Brea railway station closed to passengers in 1961 and freight in 1967. It was the main depot of the West Cornwall Railway.

The village is served by a number of bus routes to the major towns in the area such as St Ives, Penzance, Truro, Helston and Falmouth.

== Employment ==
Major employers are Pool Industrial Estate, and the Pool Innovation Centre which opened in 2010 as part of regeneration work to stimulate economic growth and development in the heartlands of Cornwall.

South Crofty Tin Mine is currently owned by Canadian mining company Strongbow Exploration Inc after buying the site from Western United Mines. Strongbow are currently in the process of constructing a water treatment plant to dewater the mine ahead of conducting a feasibility study with the aim of bringing full scale mining back to Cornwall through the introduction of modern mining methods.

== Education ==
Cornwall College's Camborne campus (formerly Camborne Technical College, or 'Tech' & Camborne, Redruth and Pool College) is based here; it provides A-Level, degree and adult education courses. Pool Academy (formerly Pool Business & Enterprise College, Pool Comprehensive School before that), provides education for the 11–16 age range. The Camborne School of Mines was based in the village from 1975 until 2004, before moving to the Exeter University's campus at Tremough, near Penryn, Cornwall.

== Town status ==
Cornwall Council and Carn Brea Parish Council are carrying out a consultation that asks whether Pool should be reclassified as a town rather than a village.

== Sport ==
Duchy Hockey Club are based at Pool Academy. The club fields three Men's teams and one women's team in addition to various junior age groups, and compete in the West of England regional league.

=== Cornish Wrestling ===
Cornish wrestling tournaments were held in Pool at South Crofty Mine for prizes. In addition there were tournaments at the Basset Arms, in the 1800s and 1900s. Trevenson Park and Pool School and Community College.

== See also ==
- Trevenson
