= Roscroggan =

Coordinates: 50.232°N 5.301°W

- Location within Cornwall
- OS grid reference: SW647421
- Unitary authority: Cornwall
- Ceremonial county: Cornwall
- Region: South West
- Country: England
- Sovereign state: United Kingdom

Roscroggan is a hamlet north of Camborne in Cornwall, England.

== Fatal WWII plane crash ==
In the Second World War, on Friday 24 July 1942, a Bristol Beaufort twin-engine torpedo bomber, AW288, of No. 86 Squadron RAF crashed into the disused Roscroggan Chapel. All four of the crew perished at the scene.

== See also ==
- Aviation accidents and incidents
