= Carn Brea, Redruth =

Civil parish and site in Cornwall, England

Carn Brea
- Civil parish
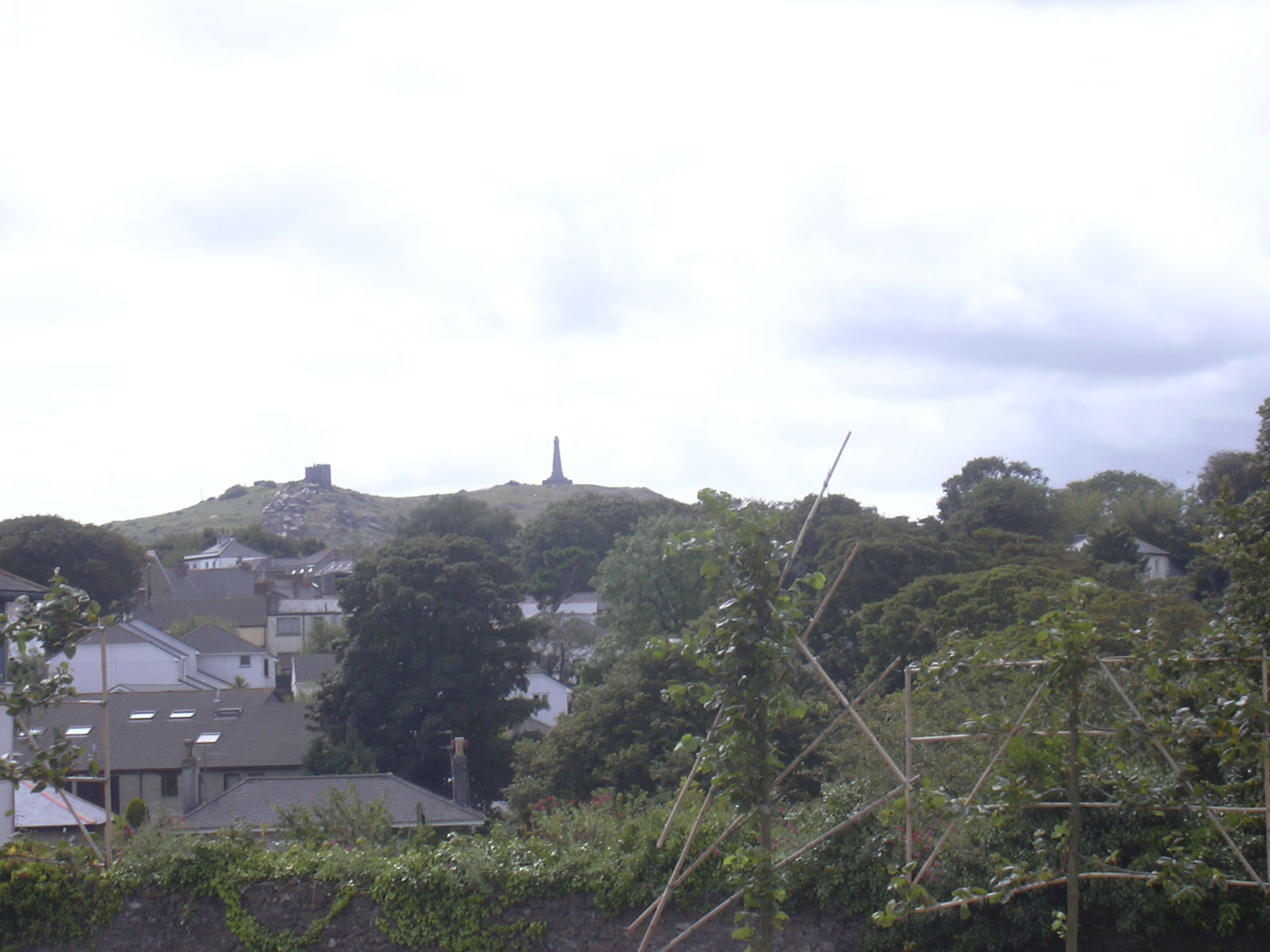
- Carn Brea, seen from Redruth. Carn Brea Castle and Monument are visible at the top of the hill.

- Location within Cornwall
- Coordinates: 50°13′19″N 5°14′49″W
- Country: United Kingdom
- Division: England
- County: Cornwall

Carn Brea (Cornish: Karnbre) is a civil parish and hilltop site in Cornwall, England, United Kingdom. The population of Carn Brea including Bosleake and Church Coombe was 8,013 at the 2011 census. The hilltop site is situated approximately one mile (1.6 km) southwest of Redruth. The settlements of Bosleake, Brea, Broad Lane, Carn Arthen, Carn Brea Village, Carnkie, Four Lanes, Grillis, Illogan Highway, Pencoys, Penhallick, Piece, Pool, Tolskithy, Tregajorran, Treskillard, Tuckingmill and West Tolgus are in the parish.

== Neolithic settlement ==
The Neolithic settlement at Carn Brea was a tor enclosure occupied between around 3700 and 3400 BC. Roger Mercer directed archaeological excavations of the site in 1970 and 1972.

A two-acre (0.81-hectare) inner enclosure was surrounded by one of eleven acres (4.5 hectares). The ramparts consisted of stone walls with an earth bank and ditch. Traces of fourteen platforms on which would have stood Neolithic long houses have been found within its ramparts, along with pottery and flint artefacts.

The settlement had an estimated population of 100 to 150. There is evidence that the occupants cleared the surrounding land for farming by burning away the undergrowth and removing stones although the acid soil obliterated any environmental evidence. Nearby outcrops of rock suitable for making axes would have contributed to the village's economy. Edge grinding stones, blanks and incomplete and finished axes found on the site indicate the inhabitants were accomplished stoneworkers and traded their products. Pottery found on the site appears to have been made from gabbroic clay originating nearly 20 miles (32 km) to the south in the present day parish of St Keverne suggesting a complex economic network in the area.

Over 700 flint arrowheads were found scattered at the site. Despite nineteenth-century destruction (work to level and widen the entrance track), there was a concentration of arrow heads around a probable entrance to the enclosure, Mercer's site E. These arrows may have been used by a large group of archers in an organized assault upon a defended site. Every timber structure on the site had been burnt, and charcoal was the only organic matter that survived the acid soils. The earthworks may have been deliberately damaged by invaders.

== Iron Age settlement ==
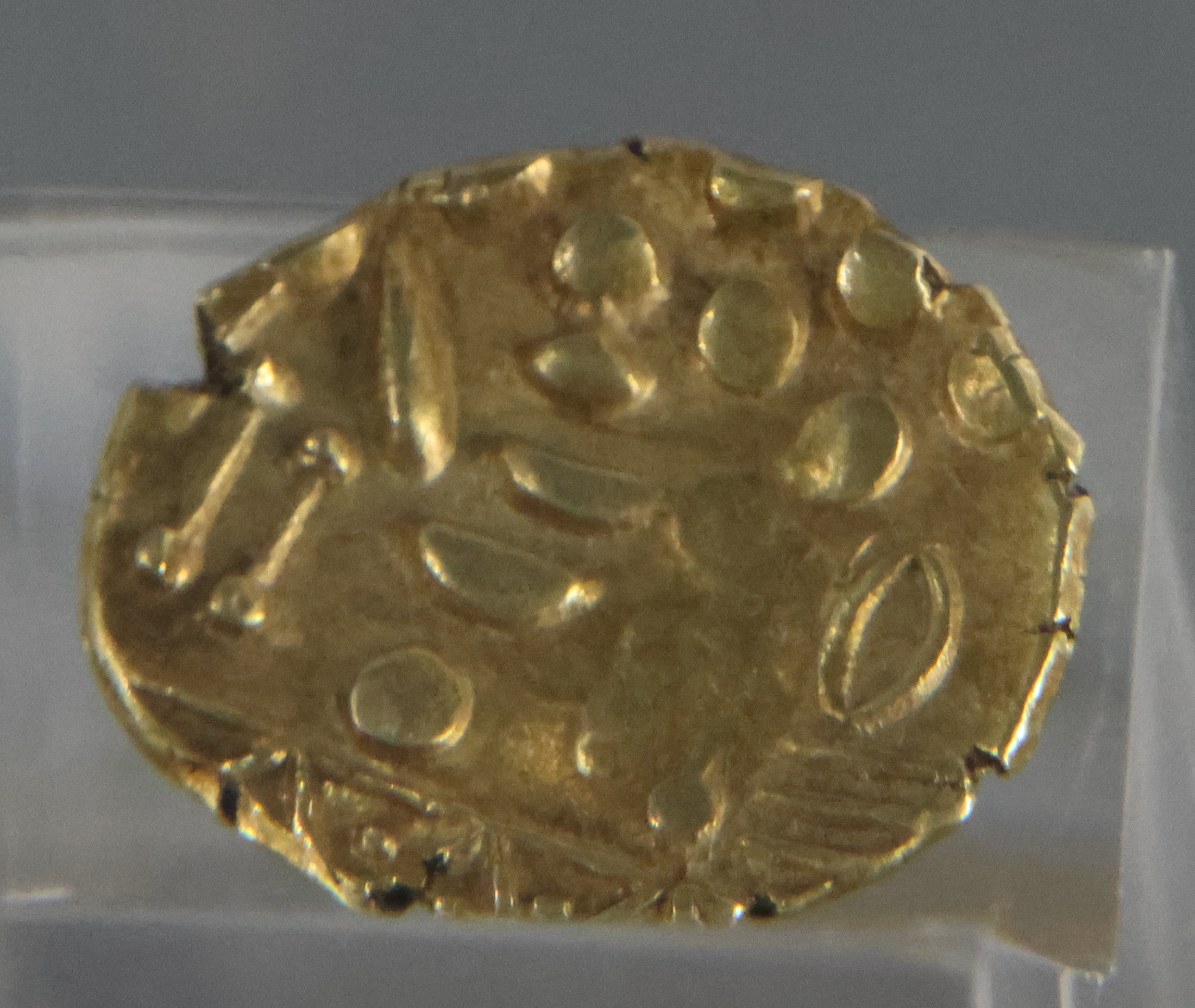
Westerham gold stater from the hoard found in 1749

In the Iron Age the site was reoccupied and minerals were mined from the hillside. One hut floor was excavated, and sherds of characteristically Iron Age types, including 'cordoned ware', were found. The fortified gateway, Mercer's Site G, was of Iron Age form, and Mercer suggests that although Site G produced no Iron Age artifacts, it is post-Neolithic. The crushed-rock road surface showed little sign of contemporary wear and could never have been subjected to even a modicum of traffic.

A hoard of gold coins – Gallo-Belgic staters originating from northeastern Gaul and Kent – was found in the 18th century.

The Ravenna Cosmography, of around AD 700, refers to Purocoronavis (almost certainly a corruption of Durocornovium), 'a fort or walled settlement of the Cornovii' (unidentified, but possibly Tintagel or Carn Brea).

== Landmarks ==
=== Carn Brea Castle ===
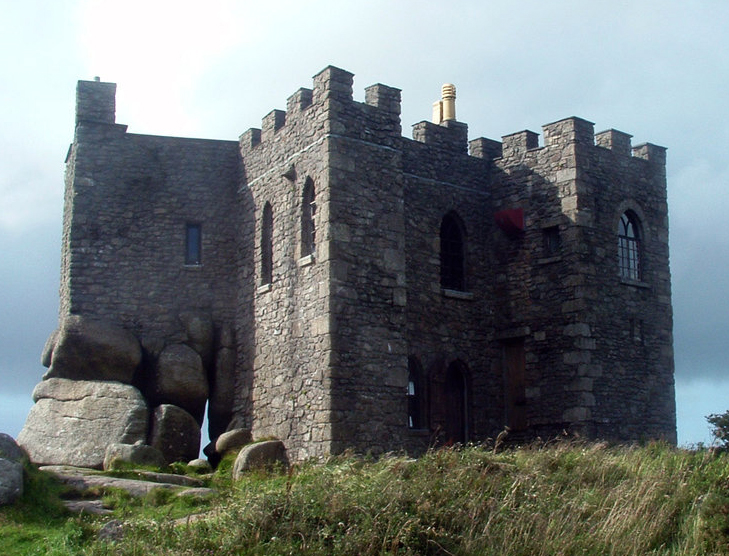
Carn Brea Castle

Carn Brea Castle stands near the top of the hill. It is built on the site of a chapel built in 1379 probably dedicated to St Michael. It was built in the 18th century by the Basset family as a hunting lodge. It is considered to be a folly built on the huge uncut boulders that make up part of its foundations, giving the impression of the building melting into the land. An East India trading ship named after Carn Brea Castle was wrecked off the Isle of Wight in 1829 and involved in excise tax fraud.

In the 1980s the abandoned building was converted into a Middle Eastern cuisine restaurant. The stolen Ford Anglia featured in the Harry Potter films was found at the castle in 2005. 50°13′20.85″N 5°14′41.40″W

=== Basset Monument ===
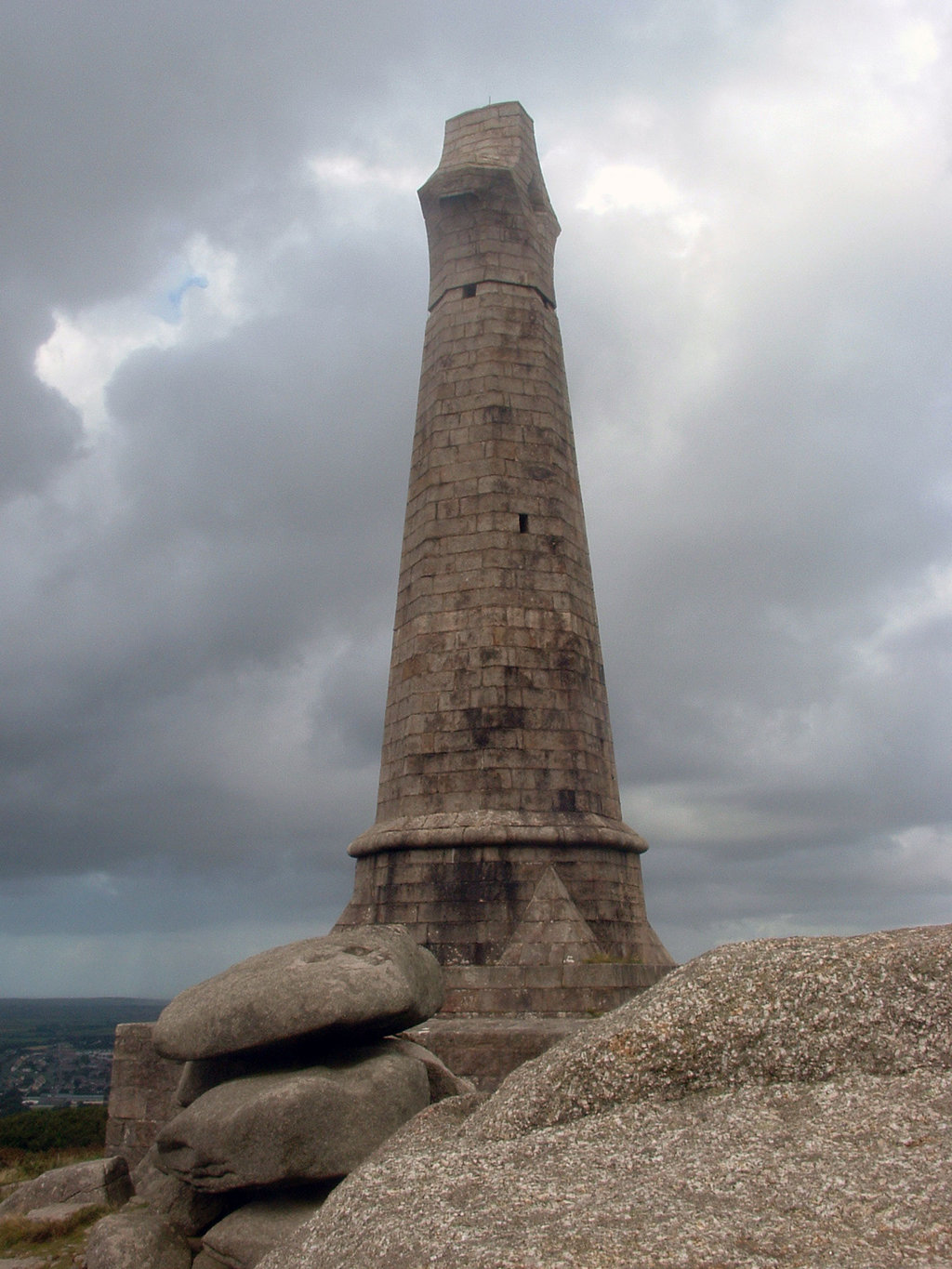
Basset Monument

At the highest point of the hill is a 90-feet high (27m) Celtic cross erected as a monument to Francis Basset, 1st Baron de Dunstanville and Basset (1757–1835). Basset, a mine owner, gained his titles for erecting earthworks to defend Plymouth from combined French and Spanish fleets in 1779, and suppressing a miners' "food riot" in 1785. Along with others, he petitioned the House of Lords against slavery in 1828. The monument was erected by public subscription in 1836. It is inscribed "The County of Cornwall to the memory of Francis Lord de Dunstanville and Basset A.D. 1836." 50°13′16″N 5°14′56″W

=== Cup and Saucer Rock ===
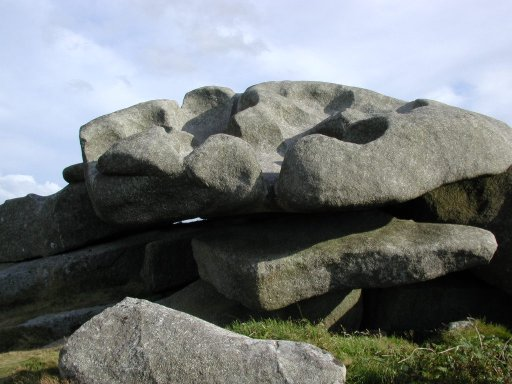
Panholes or weathering pits on the Cup and Saucer Rock.

The Cup and Saucer Rock next to the monument is a large flattish rock with several deep basins. The rock has been called "The Sacrificing Rock" (although with doubtful historical accuracy). 50°13′16″N 5°14′54″W

The type of weathering is known as panholes or weathering pits and are common in unglaciated rock outcrops.

=== Smugglers' Cave ===
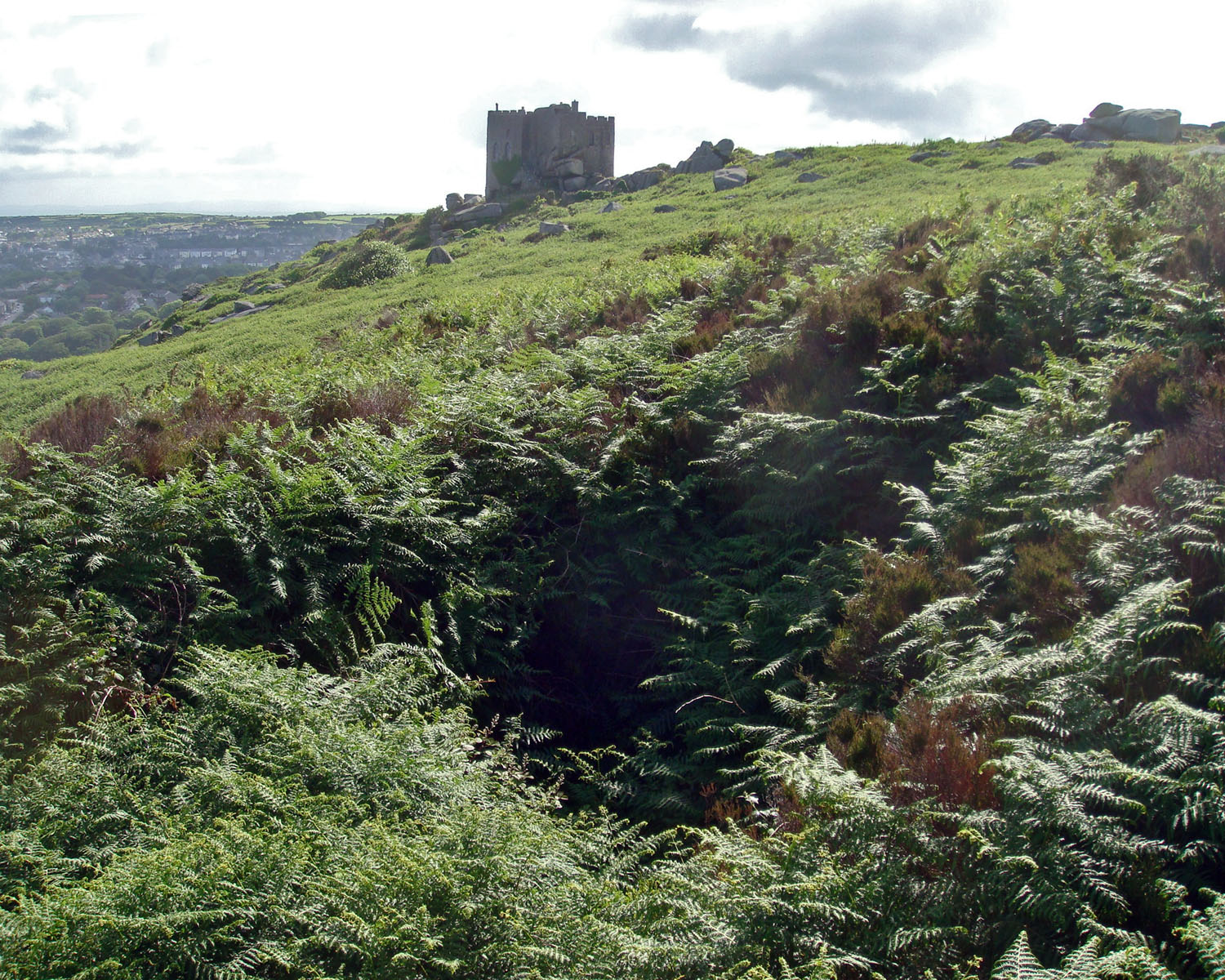
Smugglers' Cave

In a depression between the monument and the castle are the remains of the "Smugglers' Cave". It was blocked with rocks by the council in the 1980s to stop children entering. The tunnel is rumoured to extend from the top of the carn into Redruth town, but it is probably an abandoned mine working. It may have been confused with another tunnel from the castle to St Uny's church which was blocked for safety reasons around 1970 by the castle owners. 50°13′19″N 5°14′50″W

=== Saint Euny's Well ===
Saint Euny's Well is at the foot of Carn Brea below the castle near St Euny's Church. It has a plaque by Carn Brea Parish Trails reading "St Euny Well. Holy well of St Euny visited by the Celtic Missionary 500AD". Stories about its sacred use may be confused with St Euny's Well at Sancreed (see Carn Euny).

== Events ==
At Easter Redruth Baptist Church erects a lit cross on the outcrop behind the Castle overlooking Redruth. For many years a Christian sunrise service has been held on Easter Sunday.

The Midsummer Eve (St. John's Eve, 23 June) bonfire ceremony originated as a pagan ritual. Prayers are read in Cornish and the bonfire is lit, signalling other fires to be lit at Sennen, Sancreed Beacon, Carn Galver to the Tamar. When only the embers remain, young people leap across them to drive away evil and bring luck.

The Boxing Day meet of the Four Burrow Hunt starts at the top of Carn Brea. Due to the changes in fox hunting legislation foxes are no longer hunted.

== See also ==
- Dumnonii – a Celtic tribe who inhabited part of the South West peninsula of Britain, during the Iron Age and the early Roman period.
- Great Flat Lode
- Carn Brea railway station – the site of the West Cornwall Railway's locomotive workshops.
