= South Tehidy =

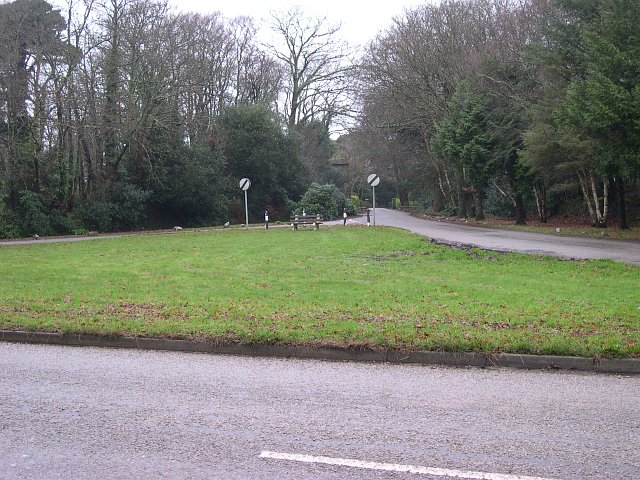
South Tehidy

South Tehidy is a hamlet north of Camborne in west Cornwall, England.
