= Carn Brea Castle =

Former hunting lodge in Cornwall, England

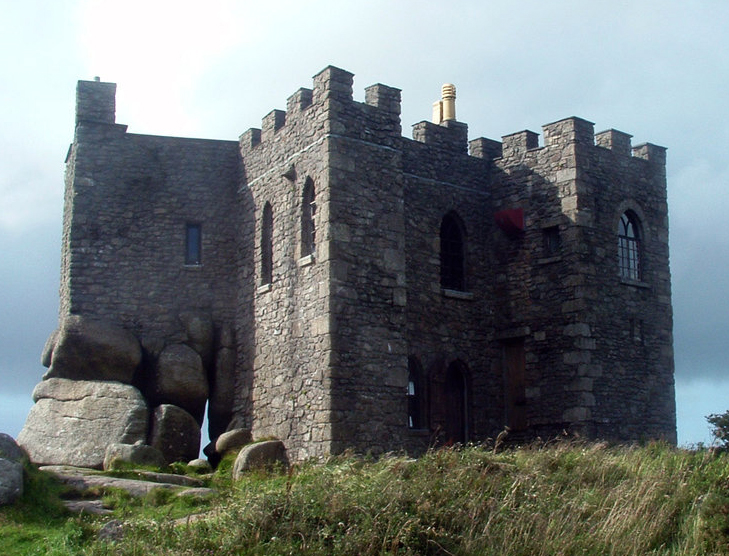
- South side in 2009

- Location within Cornwall
- 50.222458°N 5.244833°W
- Location: Carn Lane, Carnkie, Redruth, Cornwall, England

Listed Building – Grade II
- Official name: Carn Brea Castle
- Designated: 9 April 1975
- Reference no.: 1160284

Carn Brea Castle on Carn Brea is a 14th-century grade II listed granite stone building which was extensively remodelled in the 18th century as a hunting lodge in the style of a castle for the Basset family. The building is in private use as a restaurant.

== Description ==
The castle is a small stone folly decorated in the romantic ideal style of a medieval/gothic castle. It has an irregular layout with four rectangular turrets round a core of the same height and an embattled parapet. The building is built into a large stone outcrop with a steep drop on the rear. The building was designed as a hunting lodge rather than a dwelling and measures 60 by 10 feet (18.3 by 3.0 m).

== History ==
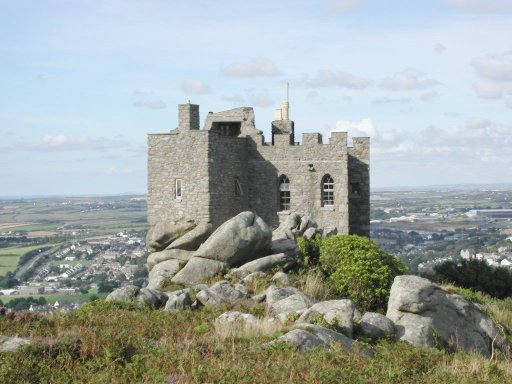
West side, photo taken in 1996.

The castle was originally built as a chapel, in 1379, thought to be dedicated to St Michael. Antiquarian William Worcester recorded that there were 32 castles on the Cornish peninsula, including Carn Brea which was described as a tower.

The castle was extensively rebuilt in later periods, primarily in the 18th century by the Basset family as a hunting lodge. It is considered a folly, due to the huge uncut boulders that make up part of its foundations, giving the impression of the building melting into the land.

Its use as a beacon for ships was recorded in 1898 when stipulated in the lease, the tenant agreeing to show a light in the north facing window. The castle had periods of disuse and disrepair in the 1950s to 1970s, until private renovation in 1975-1980. The building was classed by English Heritage as grade II listed in 1975.

In the 1980s the building was converted into a Middle Eastern cuisine restaurant.

== Media interest ==
- A 19th-century East India trading ship was named after Carn Brea Castle. It was wrecked off the Isle of Wight in 1829 and reported in The Times as being involved in excise tax fraud.
- Carn Brea castle appeared in the 1983 James Bond film Never Say Never Again, as two air-launched cruise missiles armed with nuclear warheads fly over the English countryside and out to sea, passing directly over as well as the nearby Basset monument viewed through the missiles head-up display.
- The stolen Ford Anglia featured in the Harry Potter films was found at the Castle in 2006.

== See also ==
- Castles in Great Britain and Ireland
- List of castles in England
- Carn Brea Castle (1824 ship)
