= Knave-Go-By =

Coordinates: 50°12′12″N 5°17′28″W

- Village
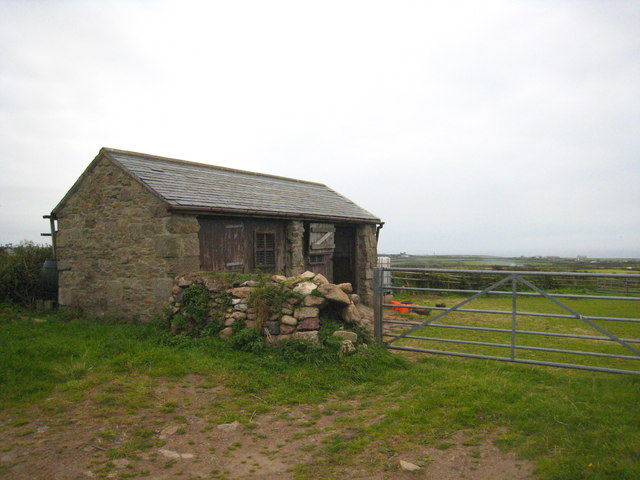
- Stables at Knave-Go-By

- Location within Cornwall
- OS grid reference: SW 6554 3899
- Civil parish: Camborne
- Unitary authority: Cornwall
- Ceremonial county: Cornwall
- Region: South West
- Country: England
- Sovereign state: United Kingdom
- Post town: HELSTON
- Postcode district: TR14
- Police: Devon and Cornwall
- Fire: Cornwall
- Ambulance: South Western
- UK Parliament: Camborne and Redruth

Knave-Go-By (also known as Knave-go-bye or Knave Go By) is a village located on the outskirts of Camborne in the English county of Cornwall in the South West region of the United Kingdom. It is in the TR14 postcode area.

Knave go by is sometimes erroneously depicted as being located in Dartmoor in the neighboring county of Devon, despite no place of that name ever having existed there. The village is featured as the backdrop to the 1951 book Knave-go-by: the adventures of Jacky Nameless. It also occasionally features in books such as Collection of Weird: Place Names on account of its unusual name.

== Politics ==
The village is within the Camborne and Redruth UK Parliament Constituency. The current MP of this constituency is George Eustice of the Conservative Party. It is represented at Cornwall Council as part of the Camborne Treslothan Unitary Authority Electoral Division. As of 2017, the current Cornwall Councillor for Camborne Treslothan is David Atherfold from the Conservative Party

== Name ==
The origin of its name has been subject to speculation. It refers to an incident involving the founder of the Methodist church the Reverend John Wesley. Wesley came to the village several times in August 1743, it is supposed that he took the route to avoid the warden of the neighboring parish. He preached to the local population from a split elm tree in the village centre. After crowds gathered there to watch John Wesley, an incident occurred by which the village was named, however, the exact details of what happened are subject to speculation.

Unfortunately this story appears to be just that - a story - the name was recorded as Never-go-by, before Wesley's time, because it was relatively little visited.

According to locals one supposed version is that during one of Wesley's missionary visits, a woman leaned from her cottage window and shouted, “Let the knave go by”, a comment for Wesley to move on. This is based on the supposition that the local Anglicans referred to Wesley as a Knave on account of his faith. Another possible version is that Wesley was heckled by a drunk "knave" during a sermon, and when the crowd tried to detain the troublemaker, Wesley is reputed to have said, “Let the knave go by.” The area has been known as Knave-go-bye ever since, although the spelling has varied. John Wesley's elm tree, named Wesley’s Tree stood in the village until it died and blew over on Camborne Festival Day, circa mid 1980s. No new tree has been planted at the site to replace it. BBC Radio Cornwall featured an item on the hamlet in 2014, and added a Facebook video of a resident who, in part, explains the historic nature of this location. It was since learned that the tree was not an oak, as spoken of in the video, but an elm, which suffered Dutch Elm disease and fell.
