= Four Lanes =

Four Lanes: Cornish: Peder Bownder
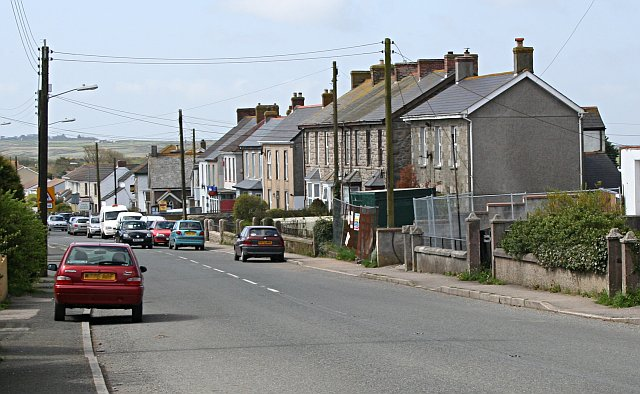
- Four Lanes

- Location within Cornwall
- OS grid reference: SW 689 386
- Civil parish: Carn Brea
- Unitary authority: Cornwall
- Ceremonial county: Cornwall
- Region: South West
- Country: England
- Sovereign state: United Kingdom
- Post town: REDRUTH
- Postcode district: TR16
- Dialling code: 01209
- Police: Devon and Cornwall
- Fire: Cornwall
- Ambulance: South Western
- UK Parliament: Camborne and Redruth

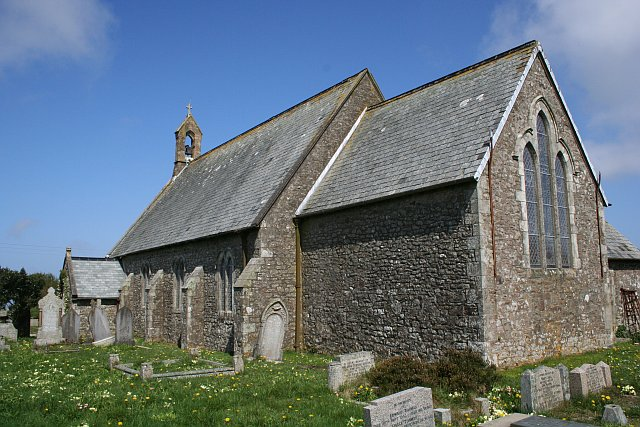
Pencoys Parish Church

Four Lanes (Cornish: Peder Bownder) is a village in west Cornwall, England, United Kingdom approximately 3 miles (4.8 km) south of Redruth at grid reference SW 689 386 in the civil parish of Carn Brea.

Pencoys is a smaller settlement which adjoins Four Lanes immediately to the south. St Andrew's Church was consecrated by Bishop Benson in 1881.

== Geography ==
Four Lanes and Pencoys are on the upland plateau of the Carnmenellis granite batholith. Four Lanes village centre is 220 metres (720 feet) above sea level. The village is centred on The Square which is at a crossroads where the north-to-south B3297 Redruth-Helston road is intersected by unclassified lanes to Stithians (south-east) and Carnkie (north-west). Post-1960s housing estates are to the south of the crossroads.

== History ==
Four Lanes is the main settlement in the ecclesiastical parish of Pencoys which was established in 1881. In earlier times the area was part of the parish of Wendron and the name Pencoys means the end of the wood. Maria Charlotte Broadley, the wife of the Vicar of Carnmenellis, wished to provide a church for the outlying hamlet of Four Lanes but her husband died and she moved elsewhere. In the late 1870s she returned and ensured that a building used for occasional services which had become dilapidated was repaired. She still wished to provide a proper church, made appeals for funds and the new church was consecrated on 4 April 1881 at a cost of £1,250. Mrs Broadley had given £1,050 of this and also the cost of many of the fittings and the east window. She is commemorated by a plaque in Pencoys church placed there in 1977 as part of the celebrations of the centenary of the Diocese of Truro. The church seats two hundred and is built in the Early English style with nave, chancel and a small north chapel used for vestries. The stone was quarried locally with arches and dressings of granite and Wild Duck stone. (Note: Wild Duck was the name of the Sportsmans Arms and Loscombe Lane was known as Duck Lane. The stone, an elvan, was quarried locally.) The parish war memorial is the church's lych gate (built in 1921) which features commemorative plaques in the gateway.

The older part of Four Lanes straddles the B3297 road north of the crossroads and post-1960s housing estates are to the south of the crossroads.

The classical soprano singer Wendy Eathorne was born at Four Lanes in 1939.

== Cornish wrestling ==
Cornish wrestling tournaments were held in the field by the Victoria Inn.

== The village today ==
There are two pubs in the village; the Victoria Inn at The Square and the Sportsman's Arms three hundred metres south on the Helston road.

Four Lanes has a male voice choir which takes part in competitions and festivals at local and national level. One of Brenda Wootton's albums, Gwavas Lake (Burlington Records, BURL 008, 1980), features the choir.

== Transmitting station ==
Redruth (Four Lanes) television transmitting station is situated half-a-mile north-west of the village at grid reference SW 690 395, 50°12′35″N 5°14′19″W and has a 173-metre (568 ft) high guyed steel lattice mast. It includes a 152.4 metres (500 ft) high guyed steel lattice mast with square cross section, which is surmounted by the television transmitting antennas, bringing the overall height of the structure to 173 metres (568 ft). It is owned and operated by Arqiva. It transmits UHF Analogue television signals, DVB television, FM radio and DAB radio. It is sometimes referred to as Four Lanes, because of the proximity of the mast to neighbouring village of the same name. The main mast is lit with four bright red aircraft warning lights, a statutory requirement of the Civil Aviation Authority.
