= Treswithian =

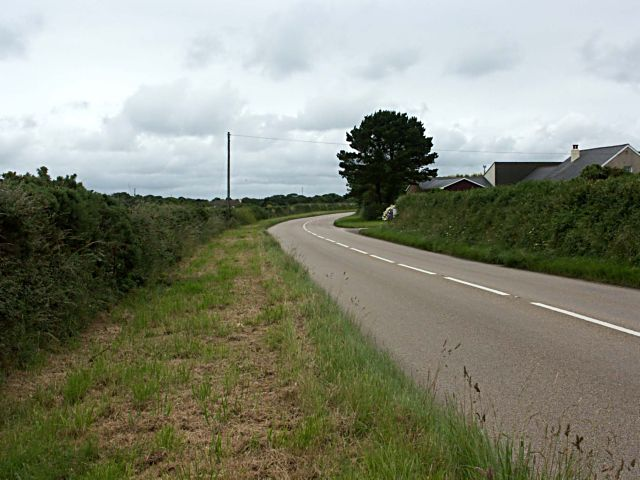
The A3078 near Treswithian

Treswithian is a hamlet west of Camborne, Cornwall, England, United Kingdom.

== See also ==
- Treswithian Downs
