= Carnkie, Redruth =

Village in Cornwall, England

Coordinates: 50.2138°N 5.2433°W

Carnkie: Cornish: Karnki
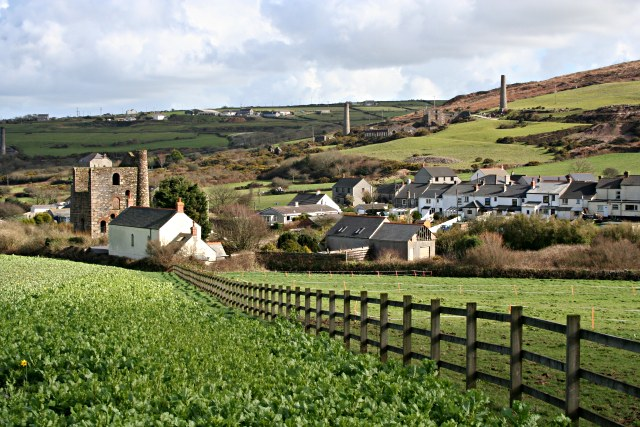
- View from the lower southern slope of Carn Brea, looking towards Carnkie

- Location within Cornwall
- OS grid reference: SW687399
- Shire county: Cornwall
- Region: South West
- Country: England
- Sovereign state: United Kingdom
- Post town: REDRUTH
- Postcode district: TR16
- Dialling code: 01209
- Police: Devon and Cornwall
- Fire: Cornwall
- Ambulance: South Western
- UK Parliament: Camborne and Redruth

Carnkie (Cornish: Karnki) is a village in west Cornwall, England, United Kingdom. It is situated approximately one and a half miles south west of Redruth. It is in the civil parish of Carn Brea.

The village is built largely along the Great Flat Lode (a massive mineral trail that was extensively mined), and is surrounded by numerous derelict mine buildings, most of which were built by the mining magnate, Lord de Dunstanville and Basset. There is a Methodist chapel building at the centre of the village which closed in 2010. The Methodist congregation now meet at Carnkie Village Hall every Sunday at 10:30am and in May 2015 celebrated their 5th year since moving.

Vehicular access to Carn Brea is gained through Carnkie, at the summit can be found a monument dedicated to Lord de Dunstanville and Basset, and Carn Brea Castle, originally believed to be a hunting lodge, but which these days serves as a restaurant.

D. M. Thomas, Cornish writer shortlisted for the 1981 Booker Prize grew up in Carnkie, Redruth.

== Etymology ==
The name Carnkie comes from the Cornish language words karn, meaning 'crag, tor', and ki, meaning 'dog'.
