= Higher Condurrow =

Coordinates: 50.206°N 5.279°W

- Location within Cornwall
- OS grid reference: SW661392
- Civil parish: Camborne
- Unitary authority: Cornwall
- Ceremonial county: Cornwall
- Region: South West
- Country: England
- Sovereign state: United Kingdom
- Post town: Camborne
- Postcode district: TR14

Higher Condurrow is a hamlet in the parish of Camborne, Cornwall, England.

== Cornish wrestling ==
Cornish wrestling tournaments, have been held at Lower Condurrow Farm, including the Heavyweight championship in 1985.
