= Illogan =

Village and civil parish in Cornwall, England

Coordinates: 50.250°N 5.268°W

Illogan: Cornish: Egloshalow
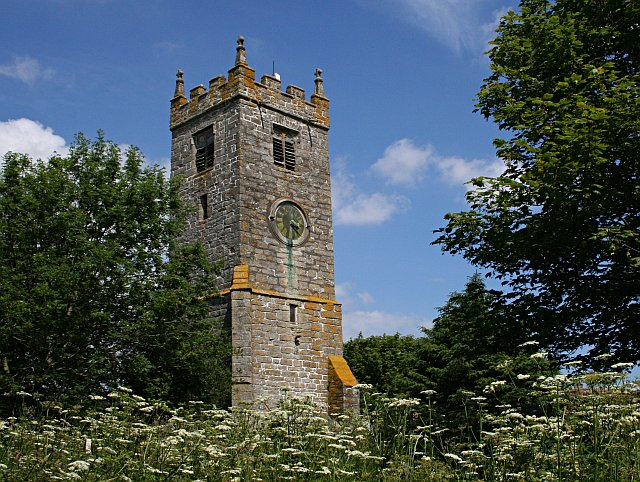
- St Illogan Church Bell Tower

- Location within Cornwall
- Population: 5,404 (Civil Parish, 2011)
- OS grid reference: SW673439
- Unitary authority: Cornwall
- Ceremonial county: Cornwall
- Region: South West
- Country: England
- Sovereign state: United Kingdom
- Post town: Redruth
- Postcode district: TR16
- Dialling code: 01209
- Police: Devon and Cornwall
- Fire: Cornwall
- Ambulance: South Western
- UK Parliament: Camborne and Redruth

Illogan (pronounced il'luggan, Cornish: Egloshalow) is a village and civil parish in west Cornwall, England, United Kingdom, two miles (3 km) northwest of Redruth. The population of Illogan was 5,404 at the 2011 census. In the same year the population of the Camborne-Redruth urban area, which also includes Carn Brea, Illogan and several satellite villages, stood at 55,400 making it the largest conurbation in Cornwall. Originally a rural area supporting itself by farming and agriculture, Illogan shared in the general leap into prosperity brought about by the mining boom, which was experienced by the whole Camborne-Redruth area.

== History ==
=== Antiquities ===
In 1931 the ruins of a Roman villa at Magor Farm were found by Nicholas Warren and excavated under the guidance of the Royal Institution of Cornwall. The villa was probably the residence of a wealthy Dumnonian who had adopted the Roman lifestyle.

=== Church ===
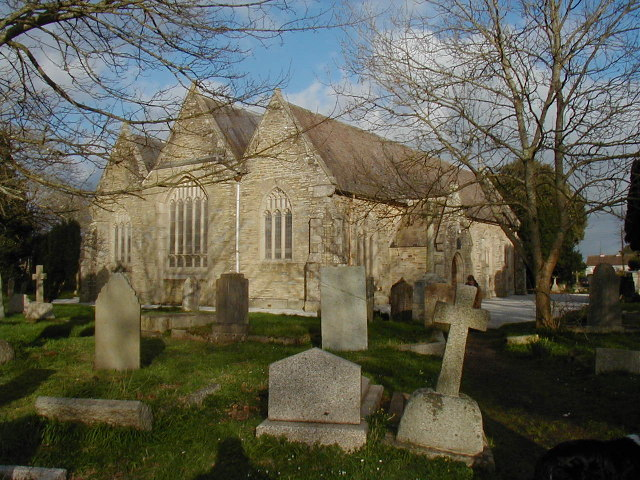
Illogan parish church

The Church of England parish church was dedicated to St Illogan (Ylloganus or Euluganus) and St Edmund; the earliest reliable reference, dated 1235, refers to the Ecclesia of Eglossalau. By 1844, the church had become too small to serve a vastly increasing mining population, so a new church was built to the designs of J. P. St Aubyn. at a cost of £2,875 and came into use on 4 November 1846. The bell tower is all that remains of the old church; Trinity House refused to allow its removal as it provided a useful landmark for shipping. The church reopened in 2012 after extensive repairs to the roof.

The churchyard includes fifty-two Commonwealth War Graves., and the grave of Thomas Merritt, whose carols are sung by Cornishmen worldwide and who was commissioned to write the 1902 Coronation March for Edward VII. The Church, its tower, the Basset sarcophagus, a Cornish cross, and the gates at the north end of the churchyard are all Grade II Listed. The Cornish cross in the churchyard is probably in situ.

- The ecclesiastical parish extends beyond Carn Brea and includes long stretches of the North Cliffs – from Reskajeage Downs on the North Cliffs to Cambrose, with a population of 12,500 people. It was split into three civil parishes - Illogan; Carn Brea, which includes the village of Pool; and Portreath.
- The civil parish has a population of 5,404 and stretches from Bridge and Harris Mill in the East; Tolvaddon and Bell Lake in the West; and from the A30 to Reskajeage.

=== Buildings ===
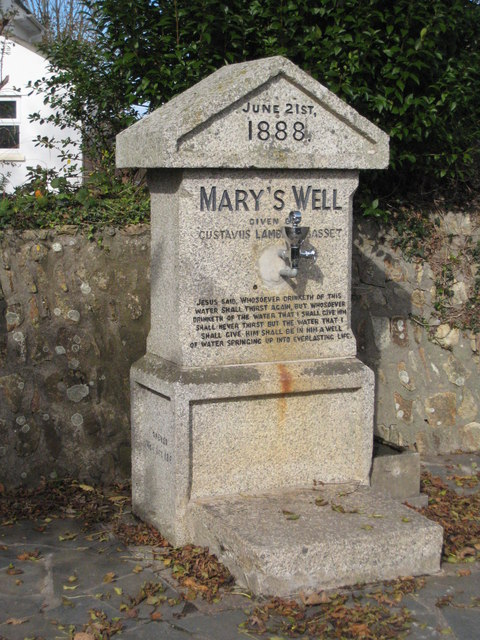
Mary's Well

- Parts of Aviary Court date back 300 years and was the home of mining engineer James Tangye; this is now a hotel.
- The Bain Memorial, in memory of David Wise Bain who owned Portreath Harbour, built in 1901 as almshouses for decayed (invalid) miners.
- Mary's Well (1888) named after the wife of Gustavus Lambart Basset .
- The Plymouth limestone and granite faced Paynters Lane End Methodist Church, was built in 1890. The Methodist Sunday School was built in 1858; 30 years before the Chapel.

== Amenities ==
- Illogan School provides education for 4-11 year olds.
- Tehidy Country Park, the largest area of woodland in West Cornwall, containing an 18-hole golf course. Is owned and managed by Cornwall Council. Tehidy was the estate of the Basset family, one of the four most powerful families in Cornwall who had extensive lands and mineral rights.
- Maningham Community Woodland was opened in 2004. It was part of an ornamental garden for the old Rectory now called Maningham – now a private house – built of Bath stone in 1783 for the Rev John Basset, brother of Lord De Dunstanville whose monument is seen on Carn Brea.

== Notable residents ==
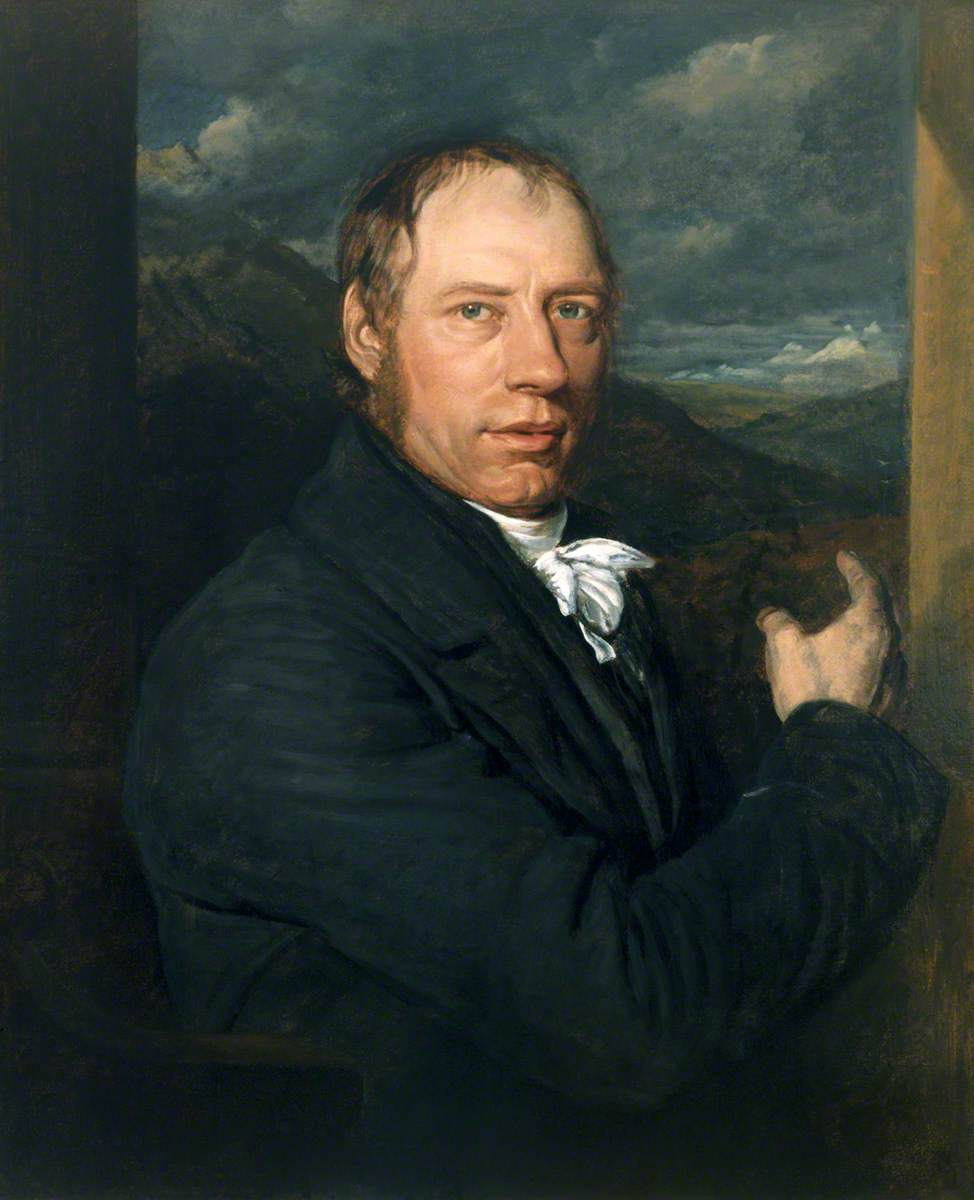
Richard Trevithick. 1816

- Sir Francis Bassett (1594 – 1645), of Tehidy, was Sheriff of Cornwall, a Vice-Admiral of North Cornwall, and Recorder of St Ives.
- Richard Trevithick (1771–1833), a British inventor and mining engineer, he developed the first high-pressure steam engine and the first working railway steam locomotive.
- Moondyne Joe (c.1826–1900), a Cornish-Welsh convict in Western Australia, known as a bushranger.
- Sir Richard Trevithick Tangye (1833–1906), engineer and philanthropist, made engines and other heavy equipment.
- Derek Holman (1931–2019), a choral conductor, organist and composer.
- Julia Goldsworthy (born 1978), politician. MP for Falmouth and Camborne from 2005 until 2010.

== Sports ==
Cornish wrestling tournaments, for prizes were held in Illogan in the 1800s and 1900s. Venues included Paynter's Lane End and Tehidy Hospital.

== Literature ==
- In the Poldark novels by Winston Graham, Demelza Carne was born in 'Illuggan'.
