= Kehelland =

Hamlet in west Cornwall, England

Coordinates: 50°13′14″N 5°20′07″W

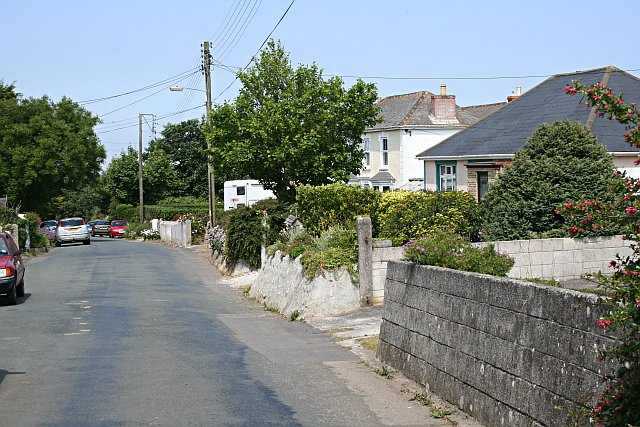
Kehelland

Kehelland (Cornish: Kellihellan) is a hamlet north-west of Camborne in west Cornwall, England.

The foundation stones for a Wesleyan chapel were laid on 20 November 1890 to replace the adjoining little chapel, which was to be used as a schoolroom. The cost of the chapel was to be £604 (equivalent to £67,105 in 2025).
