= Bolenowe =

Coordinates: 50.1961°N 5.2631°W

- Location within Cornwall
- OS grid reference: SW672379
- Civil parish: Camborne
- Unitary authority: Cornwall
- Ceremonial county: Cornwall
- Region: South West
- Country: England
- Sovereign state: United Kingdom
- Post town: CAMBORNE
- Postcode district: TR14
- Dialling code: 01209
- Police: Devon and Cornwall
- Fire: Cornwall
- Ambulance: South Western
- UK Parliament: Camborne and Redruth

Bolenowe (Cornish: Boslenow, meaning dwelling of strip-fields) is a village in west Cornwall, England, United Kingdom. It is approximately one-and-a-half miles (2 km) southeast of Camborne (where the 2011 Census population is included). It consists of cottages that are spread apart by large gardens, the only amenities are a post box and a red phone box that has now been decommissioned.

== History ==
The first record of the name was Boslaynou in 1321. A Hamelinus Bolyneu was named as one of three taxatores for the parish of Camborne in a Lay Subsidy roll of 1327. During the 16th century the occupiers of Bolenowe were titled tirek, which in the Cornish language means landed or rich in land. The Bolenowe estate may have extended to 100 Cornish acres. Bolenowe was known for producing bees wax at this time.

In the 19th and 20th centuries Bolenowe had two shops, an unlicensed pub, called a kidleywink, and two chapels.

Historian Charles Thomas has identified an area called No Man's Land near Bolenowe as an area of land left unused, perhaps since Neolithic times, as an act of sacrifice to a spirit called a Bucca and notes that there was a belief that the Bucca still haunted the moors on Bolenowe Carn into the 19th century when John Harris was growing up there.

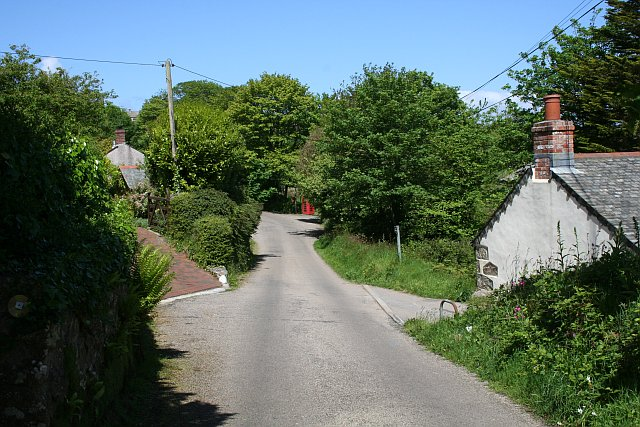
Bolenowe

== Areas ==
As well as the main settlement of Bolenowe there are several other surrounding farms and notable features which use the name Bolenowe.

- Bolenowe Wartha (Higher Bolenowe), also known as Six Chimneys, is where John Harris was born and grew up.
- Bolenowe Wollas (Lower Bolenowe) is where the current village of Bolenowe is situated.
- Bolenowe Carn is the rocky hill situated behind Bolenowe.
- Bolenowe Moor is a marshy area at the bottom of the valley and is the source for the Red River.
- Bolenowe Crofts

== Mines and quarries ==
There are several former stone quarries at Bolenowe including an elvan quarry. Bolenowe was the site of Bolenowe Carn Mine, also to the North Bolenowe Mine (South Wheal Grenville). West Tresavean Mine was further to the west and South of the nearby village of Troon. Both mines were on a sett plan held at Pendarves House until recently.

== Notable residents ==
It is famous as the birthplace of the poet John Harris winner of the Shakespeare Tercentenary Prize in 1864.
