= Cambrose =

Hamlet in Cornwall, England

Coordinates: 50°15′46.8″N 5°14′49.21″W

Cambrose: Cornish: Kammrys
- Hamlet
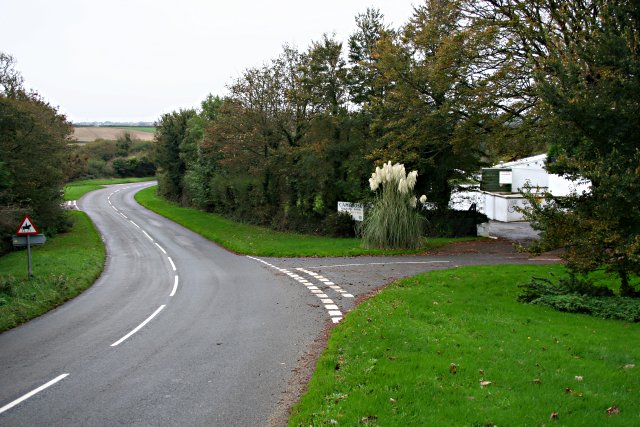

- Location within Cornwall
- Unitary authority: Cornwall
- Region: South West
- Country: England
- Sovereign state: United Kingdom
- Police: Devon and Cornwall
- Fire: Cornwall
- Ambulance: South Western

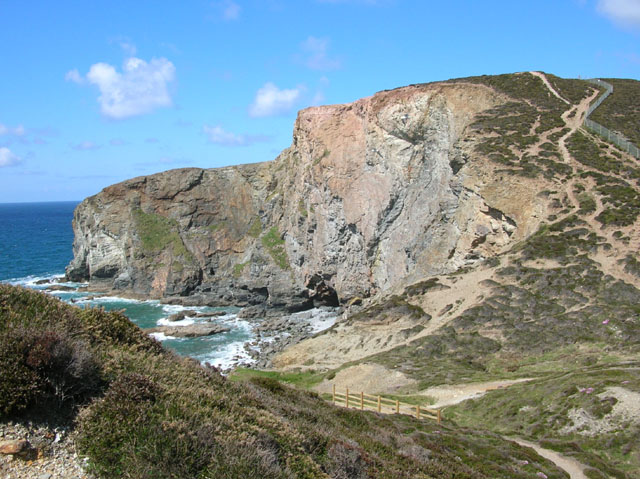
Sally's Bottom

Cambrose (Cornish: Kammrys, meaning crooked ford) is a hamlet east of Portreath in west Cornwall, England, UK.

Cambrose is the location of Sally's Bottom, a small valley running down to the coast.
