= Penhallick =

Hamlet in Cornwall, England

Coordinates: 50.220°N 5.268°W

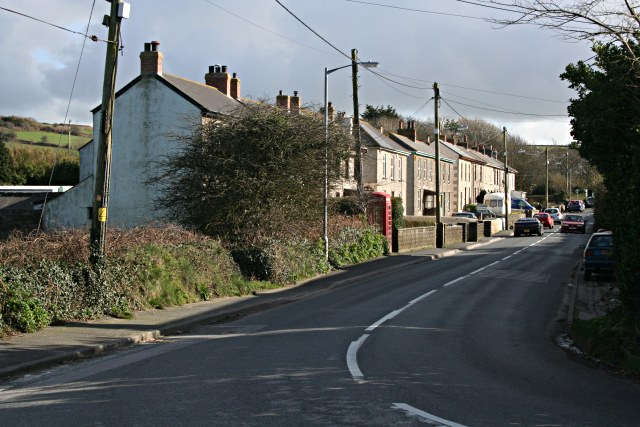
Penhallick

Penhallick (Cornish: Pennhelyk) is a hamlet near Pool in Cornwall, England, UK. Penhallick House was built in 1892 by Richard Cowlin the local miller and grocer who owned Cowlin Mill. The mill was converted in the 1980s by Kerrier Groundwork and was offices for Cornwall Council. The mill building is currently for sale with potential change of use to residential.

Penhallick is a popular starting spot for accessing the walks and cycleway along the Great Flat Lode.

Penhallick is in the parish of Carn Brea.
