= Troon, Cornwall =

Village in Cornwall, England

Coordinates: 50.20°N 5.28°W

Troon: Cornish: Trewoon
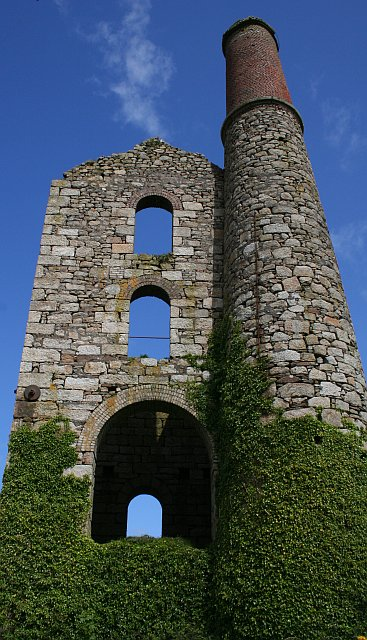
- Woolf's Engine House at Condurrow

- Location within Cornwall
- OS grid reference: SW661382
- Civil parish: Camborne
- Unitary authority: Cornwall
- Ceremonial county: Cornwall
- Region: South West
- Country: England
- Sovereign state: United Kingdom
- Post town: CAMBORNE
- Postcode district: TR14
- Dialling code: 01209
- Police: Devon and Cornwall
- Fire: Cornwall
- Ambulance: South Western
- UK Parliament: Camborne and Redruth

Troon (Cornish: Trewoon) is a village in Cornwall, UK, 1 1/2 miles (2.5 kilometres) southeast of Camborne. The village lies at around 560 feet (170 m) above sea level. An electoral ward named Troon and Beacon covers the area north from Troon to the outskirts of Camborne. The population at the 2011 census was 5,410.

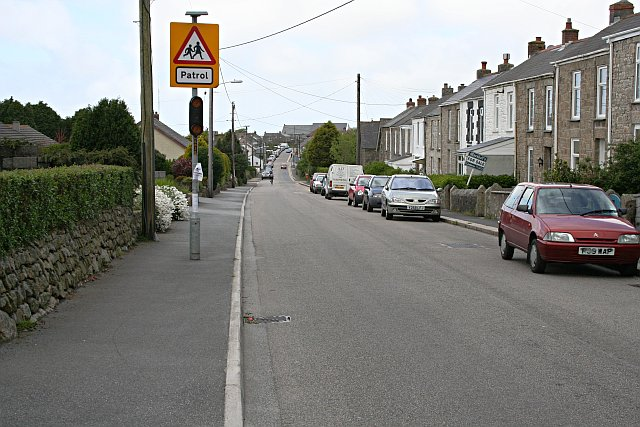
New Road, Troon

There were once important copper and tin mines near Troon, including the Grenville Mines. Wheal Grenville began to be worked in the 1820s though it was not productive until the 1850s, at which time the South and East mines were worked independently. In 1906 these mines were united with South Condurrow to form the Grenville United Mines and continued until 1920. The mineral Condurrite is a compound mineral named after the Great Condurrow Mine at Troon.

The King Edward Mine is still situated on the outskirts of the village on the Carn Brea Road. It has a museum and can still be visited.

An inscribed altar stone found at Chapel Ia, Troon (now set in the altar of the parish church), and dated to the tenth or eleventh centuries, attests to the existence of a settlement then. The chapel of Saint Ia was recorded in 1429 and a holy well was nearby. The site was called Fenton-ear (i.e. the well of Ia). The stone is very similar to one now in the garden at Pendarves, used as the base for a sundial.

There are two Cornish crosses at Pendarves; one was found in a ditch on the estate and then set up near the house. It has a crude crucifixus figure on the front and a Latin cross on the back. The other is a cross head found in the kitchen garden at Pendarves.

== Troon Cricket Club ==
Formed in 1875 as Troon Amateur Cricket Club, the club, along with Camborne, Penzance and St Just, is one of the most successful in Cornish cricket. The club is based at Treslothan Road, where it has played cricket for over a hundred years. In 1972 the club was one of the participants in the inaugural National Village Competition, beating Astwood Bank in the final at Lord's. They went on to win the competition again the following year and for a third time, which remains a record.

Among the many good players to have represented the club down the years, three homegrown players have gone on to play first-class cricket, these are Anthony Penberthy, Malcolm Dunstan and Lewis Goldsworthy. Former Pakistan and ICL spinner Arshad Khan also represented the club in the late 1990s and early 2000s.

== Cornish wrestling ==
Cornish wrestling tournaments, for prizes, have been held in Troon. Venues have included the King Edward Mine Playing Fields and Little Haven Farm at Newton Moor.

== Treslothan ==
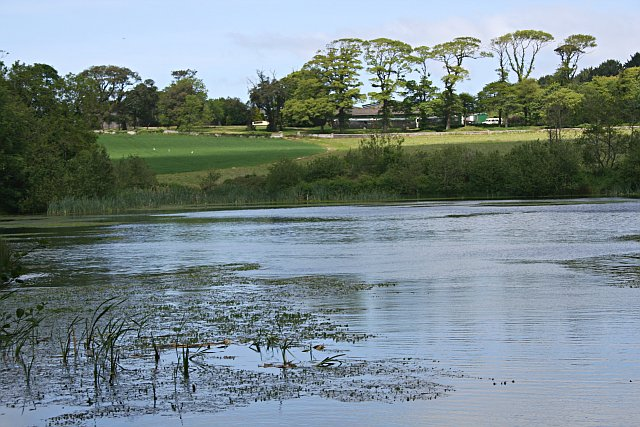
Pendarves Lake and Home Farm

Troon is in the parish of Treslothan which was divided from the parish of Camborne in 1845. St John's Church was built to the designs of George Wightwick four years earlier (opened in October 1841). The 15th century font was removed from Camborne church in the 18th century.

The miner poet John Harris (1820–1884) is buried in the churchyard, where also is the mausoleum of the Pendarves family.
