= Piece, Cornwall =

Coordinates: 50.212°N 5.259°W

Piece
- Location within Cornwall
- OS grid reference: SW678397
- Unitary authority: Cornwall
- Ceremonial county: Cornwall
- Region: South West
- Country: England
- Sovereign state: United Kingdom

Piece is a village in Cornwall, England.
