= Carn Brea Village =

Village in Cornwall, England

Coordinates: 50°13′34″N 5°14′28″W

Carn Brae: Cornish: Karnbre
- Village
- Location within Cornwall
- Civil parish: Carn Brea
- Unitary authority: Cornwall
- Ceremonial county: Cornwall
- Region: South West
- Country: England
- Sovereign state: United Kingdom
- Post town: REDRUTH
- Postcode district: TR16
- Dialling code: 01209
- Police: Devon and Cornwall
- Fire: Cornwall
- Ambulance: South Western
- UK Parliament: Camborne and Redruth

Carn Brea Village is a village in the civil parish of Carn Brea (where the 2011 census population is included), Cornwall, England. It is south of the railway line to Penzance while Tolskithy is to the north.
