= Treskillard =

English hamlet

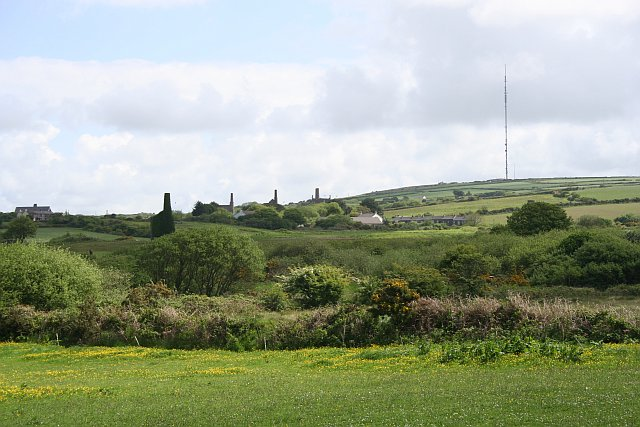
Across Newton Moor towards Treskillard

Treskillard is a hamlet southeast of Camborne in west Cornwall, England, United Kingdom.
