= West Tolgus =

Village in Cornwall, England

Coordinates: 50.23°N 5.26°W

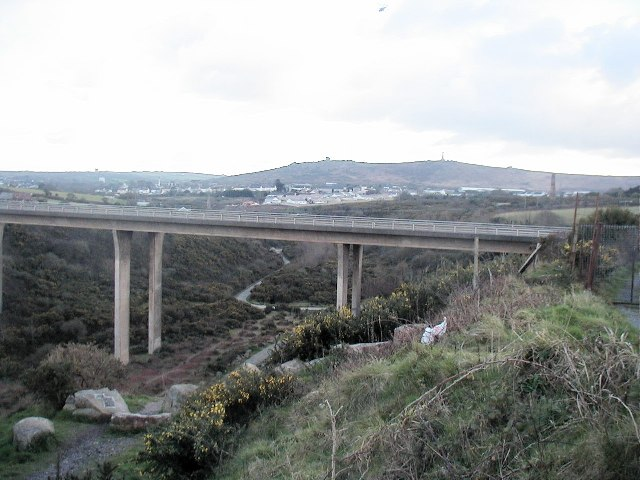

- Location within Cornwall
- Unitary authority: Cornwall
- Ceremonial county: Cornwall
- Region: South West
- Country: England
- Sovereign state: United Kingdom
- Post town: Redruth
- Postcode district: TR15
- Police: Devon and Cornwall
- Fire: Cornwall
- Ambulance: South Western
- UK Parliament: Camborne and Redruth

West Tolgus is a village in the Tolgus Valley in west Cornwall, England, United Kingdom. It lies just off the A30 road south of Illogan, northeast of Camborne and northwest of Redruth.

== History ==
=== Mining ===
The village was a notable mining area and was mined from the early 1720s. Wheal Raven Mine produced over 700 tons of copper ore in the 1760s and a little zinc ore, but hardly any tin. Facing stiff competition from other more successful mines in the area, the mine fell into difficulty and had to close. Attempts were made in 1793 and in 1805 to reopen it, and between 1810 and 1819 it reopened as Wheal Royal but was abandoned once again until the mining boom of 1824 when it reverted to its former name of Wheal Raven. It produced over 1500 tons of copper ore of a moderate grade in the period that followed but was again closed. It reopened again between 1831 and 1836 during which it produced over 500 tons of copper ore.

In 1844, a new company purchased the mine and renamed it West Tolgus and Treloweth, and just West Tolgus from 1850. It closed in 1851 and again reopened in 1860 after being bought by John Taylor and Sons. Managed by Captain Joseph Jewell, they built an engine house with a 60-inch (later 65 then 70) pumping engine and a 10-foot stroke, enabling mining to reach a depth of 312 feet or 52 fathoms by April 1862. It employed over 120 people at the time and by 1879 over 230. During the 1870s, a series of accidents caused the mine to flood, including in 1873 when flooding closed the mine for five months, and in January 1879 when the balance bob broke in two places in Richards' Shaft. The damage led to increased costs and wet mining conditions, leading to its eventual abandonment. The mine ceased operations for the final time in February 1884.

=== Cornish Wrestling ===
Cornish wrestling tournaments were held at Tolgus, for prizes, during the 1800s.
