= Brea, Cornwall =

Village in Cornwall, England

Coordinates: 50.2109°N 5.2715°W

Brea: Cornish: Bre
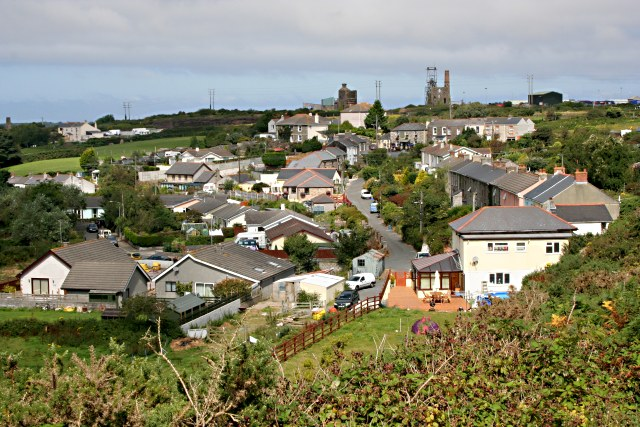
- Higher Brea

- Location within Cornwall
- Unitary authority: Cornwall
- Ceremonial county: Cornwall
- Region: South West
- Country: England
- Sovereign state: United Kingdom
- Post town: Camborne
- Postcode district: TR14
- Police: Devon and Cornwall
- Fire: Cornwall
- Ambulance: South Western

Brea (Cornish: Bre) is a village in Cornwall, England, UK, between the towns of Camborne and Redruth. It is in the civil parish of Carn Brea and consists of Brea, Lower Brea, and Higher Brea. A small stream, the Red River, flows through the village and a hill, Carn Brea dominates the landscape to the east, along with its monument to Francis Basset.
