= Tolskithy =

Hamlet in Cornwall, England

Coordinates: 50.2301°N 5.2465°W

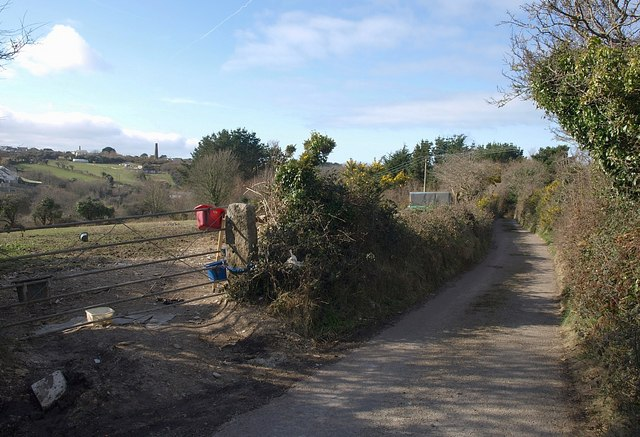
Lane to Tolskithy

Tolskithy is a hamlet west of Redruth in Cornwall, England, United Kingdom.
