= Illogan Highway =

Village in Cornwall, England

Coordinates: 50.230°N 5.266°W

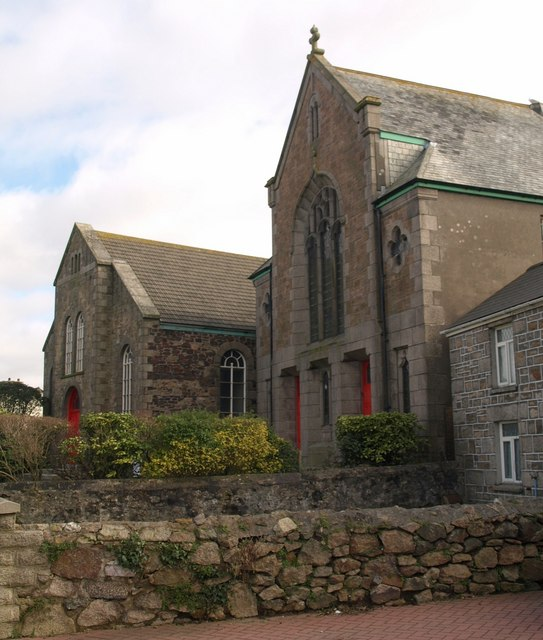
- Illogan Highway Methodist Church and Church Hall

- Location within Cornwall
- OS grid reference: SW672418
- Unitary authority: Cornwall
- Ceremonial county: Cornwall
- Region: South West
- Country: England
- Sovereign state: United Kingdom
- Post town: Redruth
- Postcode district: TR15

Illogan Highway is a village on the A30 main road west of Redruth in Cornwall, England, United Kingdom. It is in the civil parish of Carn Brea.

Thomas Merritt (1863–1908), who composed several Christmas carols, including "Hark the Glad Sound! The Saviour Comes" and "Lo! He Comes, an Infant Stranger" was organist at the Methodist church (pictured) from 1889 until his death in 1908. Merritt was born at Illogan, the son of Thomas Merritt; he also composed an oratorio “The Christian Soldier” and a sacred cantata “Shepherd of Israel”. Thomas Merritt, whose carols are sung by Cornishmen worldwide and who was commissioned to write the 1902 Coronation March for Edward VII, is buried in Illogan churchyard.
