= 2012–13 CHA Plate =

Tournament details
- Teams: 19

Final positions
- Champions: Penzance 1st XI (Men's), Penzance 2nd XI(Ladies)
- Runners-up: Bude 1st XI (Men's), Caradon 2nd XI (Ladies)

The 2012–13 Cornwall Hockey Association Plate will be the 2012–13 season of the Cornwall Hockey Association Plate, known as the Cornwall Plate or CHA Plate. The Plate is the secondary knock-out competition organised by the Cornwall Hockey Association, and will be contested by senior male and female hockey teams in the county of Cornwall who have been eliminated from the 2012–13 CHA Cup in (or prior to) Round 1.

A theoretical total of 19 teams may compete in the competition (an increase of 1 compared to the 2011–12 competition), and will begin on Sunday 22 December 2012 with the Ladies Plate Round 1. The competition will culminate with the Ladiess Plate Final in April 2013 at Penzance HC. Penzance HC are the respective holders of both the Men's and Ladies Plates.

== Format ==
Both the Men's Plate and Ladies Plate are to be contested as knockout competitions, with a single defeat eliminating the losing team.

2012–13 will see the draws for all rounds of the competitions made prior to the start of the tournament, thereby allowing teams to analyse their potential opponents in any subsequent rounds. This system was previously used in the 2009–10 season, but dropped for the 2010–11 competition in favour of a system for drawing each round following the completion of the previous one. As the trial proved unsuccessful, the system reverted for 2011–12.

== Teams and Calendar ==
=== Men's Plate ===
Based upon the results of the seven matches contested in Round 1 of the 2012–13 CHA Cup the following seven teams can qualify/have qualified for the Plate competition:

Team	Cup Result
Truro C	Truro C 1–9 Penzance
Penzance A	Truro A v Penzance A (Penzance withdrew)
TBC	Bude or Camborne SoM A
Bude A	Bodmin 9–1 Bude A
Truro B	Truro B 3–4 Duchy
Bodmin A	Caradon 11–1 Bodmin A
Duchy A	Duchy A 3–5 Camborne SoM

The draw for the competition will be based upon the draw for the 2012–13 CHA Cup.

Round	Main Date	Teams Involved	Winners from previous round	New entries
Round 1	27 Jan 12	6	0	6
Semi-final	10 Mar 12	4	3	1
Final	April 2012	2	2	0

=== Ladies Plate ===
Based upon the results of the four Preliminary Round matches, and eight matches contested in Round 1 of the 2012–13 CHA Cup the following twelve teams have qualified/can qualify for the Plate competition:

Team	Cup Result
Caradon III	Preliminary Round: Caradon III 1–3 Callington
Caradon II	Preliminary Round: Truro II v Caradon II (Caradon II withdrew)
Falmouth III	Preliminary Round: Falmouth III 4–10 Bodmin
Launceston	Preliminary Round: Launceston 0–1 Newquay II
Callington	Round 1: Bude 12–0 Callington
Duchy	Round 1: Duchy 1–6 Newquay
St. Austell	Round 1: Camborne SoM v St. Austell (St. Austell withdrew)
Truro II	Round 1: Truro 14–1 Truro II
Bodmin	Round 1: Bude II 5–0 Bodmin
Falmouth II	Round 1: Falmouth II 0–10 Falmouth
Penzance II	Round 1: Penzance II 6–7 Caradon
Newquay II	Round 1: Penzance 16–2 Newquay II

Of the twelve competing teams, eight will be drawn randomly into Round 1, with the remainder being awarded a bye to the quarter-finals.

Round	Main Date	Teams Involved	Winners from previous round	New entries
Round 1	22 Dec 11	8	0	8
Quarter-final	27 Jan 12	8	4	4
Semi-final	10 Mar 12	4	4	0
Final	15 Apr 12	2	2	0

== Results and Fixtures ==
=== Men's Plate ===
The draw for the Men's Plate was generated as a result of the Men's Cup Draw:

Quarter-final
14	Truro C
11	Penzance A
Bude or CSM A
13	Bude A
-bye
9	Truro B
10	Bodmin A
15	Duchy A

Semi-final
9	Truro B

Final

=== Ladies Plate ===
Of the twelve teams qualified to contest the Ladies Plate, two (St. Austell and Falmouth III) withdrew from the competition prior to the Round 1 draw. Of the remaining ten teams, the lowest-ranked four clubs were entered into Round 1, whilst the higher-ranked six clubs entered at the quarter-final stage.

Round 1
9	Callington
10	Newquay II
7	Launceston
8	Caradon III

Quarter-final
1	Duchy
3	Bodmin
5	Caradon II
2	Penzance II
4	Falmouth II
6	Truro II

Semi-final

Final
