= School of Metalliferous Mining =

The School of Metalliferous Mining was formed in 1910 by the amalgamation of all the mining schools in Cornwall, England.

== History ==
In the 19th century mining schools under government patronage were being established all across the British Empire. There were at the time three mining schools in Cornwall; at Camborne, Penzance and Redruth and it was felt that they should be combined. The newly amalgamated school would occupy the Camborne Mining School site and the Camborne Mining School brand be continued. Mr. W. Ficher Wilkinson was appointed as the first principal of the newly formed School of Metalliferous Mining. He was educated at Harrow and at the Freiberg University of Mining and Technology in Germany.

The school later included Camborne in the title creating the Camborne School Of Metalliferous Mining, and in 1975 the school changed its name to Camborne School of Mines to better describe its academic activities.

== Amalgamated mining schools ==
=== Redruth Mining School ===
The Redruth School of Mines and Art School opened in 1882 or 83 and was located somewhere in Clinton Road to the east of the town. With the removal of mining education to Camborne the site became the Science and Art School and continued to teach art and science.

A wing of the Redruth Mining School was a large mineral museum called the Robert Hunt Memorial Museum erected by The Miners Association of Devon and Cornwall to the memory of Robert Hunt FRS, keeper of the Mining Record Office in London. This museum remained open until 1950 when it closed and the specimens were taken to the Camborne School of Mines.

=== Camborne Mining School ===
The Camborne campus of Camborne School of Mines, as it became known, was located just off Camborne Trelowarren Street in Trevu Road. In 1876 George Basset, the great mine entrepreneur, made a bequest to build a laboratory in Camborne, The Basset Building, for the use of the pupils of The Miners Association. In 1882 the adjacent Camborne Science and Art School building opened. Until the amalgamation of the schools in 1910 Mr. J.J. Beringer had been principal for 28 years.

=== Penzance Mining School ===
The Penzance Mining and Science School opened on 7 October 1890, at a cost for building and fittings of nearly £1,900. The school consisted of two floors, the ground floor housed the technical instruction hall and the lecture theatre and upstairs chemical lecture rooms, class rooms and a laboratory filled with working benches for 24 students, a furnace room for metallurgical work and a balance room. Andrew Ketcham Barnett was the first principal of the Mining and Science School at Penzance, which had been established due to his classes on mineralogy in 1873. Philip Burne Corin (1860-1933) was a master here from 1893 to 1910.

== See also ==
- Camborne School of Mines
