= Shaft sinking =

Process of excavating a vertical or near vertical tunnel from the top down

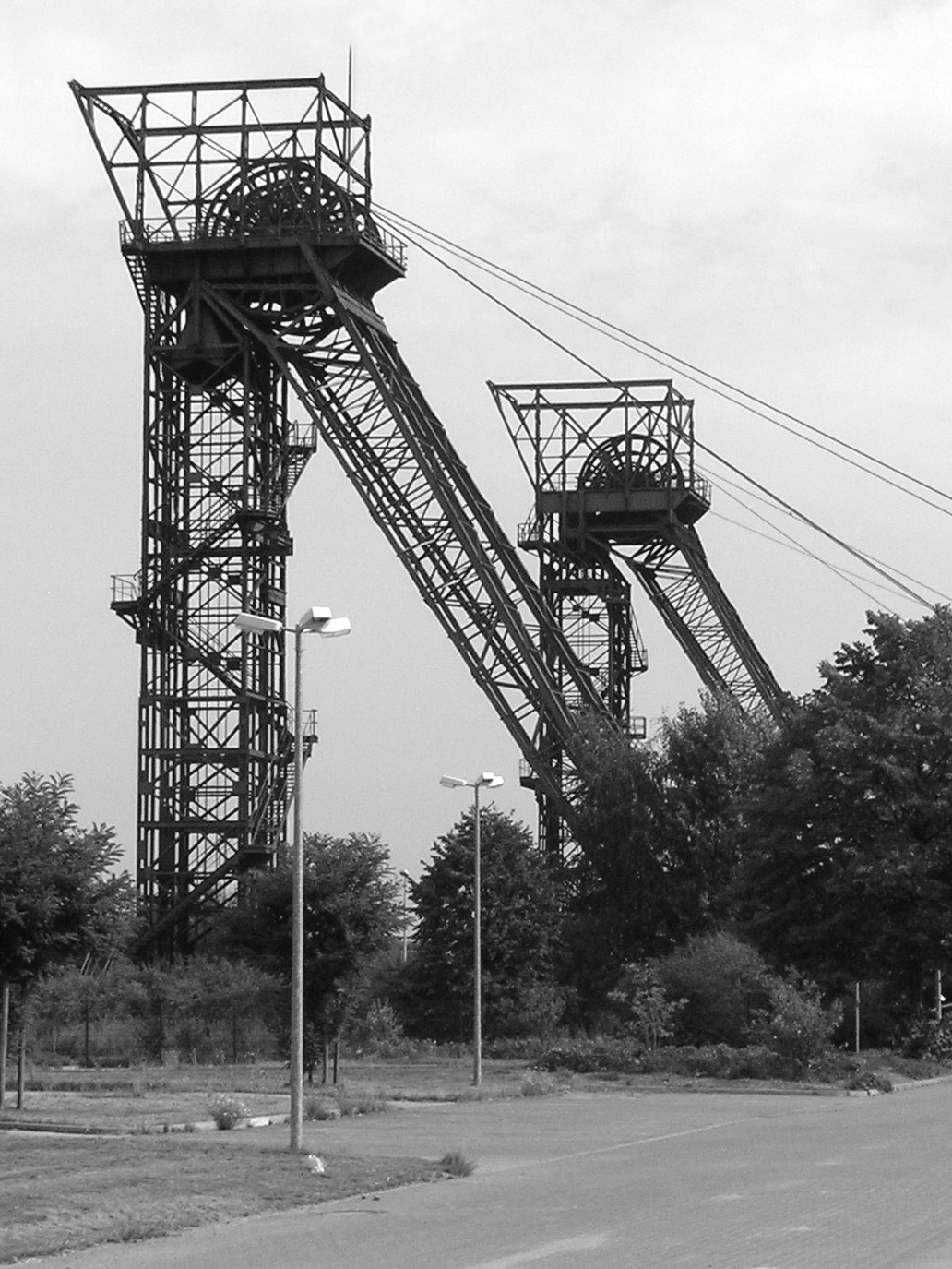
Abandoned mine shafts in Marl, Germany

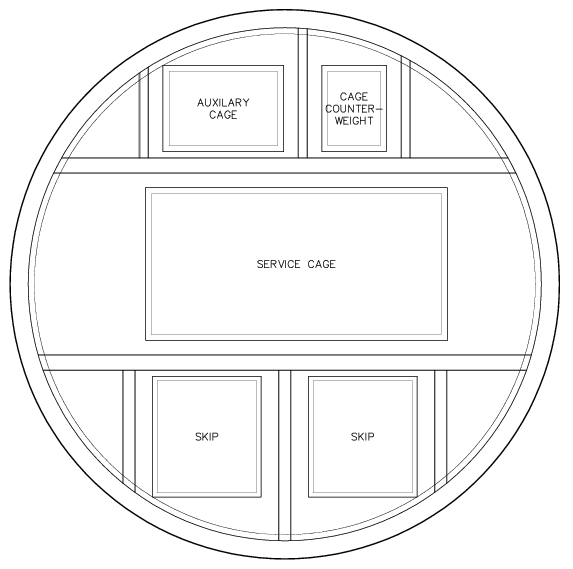
A plan-view schematic of a mine shaft showing cage and skip compartments. Services may be housed in either of the four open compartments.

Shaft mining or shaft sinking is the action of excavating a mine shaft from the top down, where there is initially no access to the bottom. Shallow shafts, typically sunk for civil engineering projects, differ greatly in execution method from deep shafts, typically sunk for mining projects.

Shaft sinking is one of the most difficult of all mining development methods: restricted space, gravity, groundwater and specialized procedures make the task quite formidable. Shafts may be sunk by conventional drill and blast or mechanised means.

Historically, mine shaft sinking has been among the most dangerous of all the mining occupations and the preserve of mining contractors called sinkers. Today shaft sinking contractors are concentrated in Canada, Germany, China and South Africa.

The modern shaft sinking industry is gradually shifting further towards greater mechanisation. Recent innovations in the form of full-face shaft boring (akin to a vertical tunnel boring machine) have shown promise but the use of this method is, as of 2019, not widespread.

== Mine shafts ==
Mine shafts are vertical or near-vertical tunnels, which are "sunk" as a means of accessing an underground ore body, during the development of an underground mine.

The shape (in plan view), dimensions and depth of mine shafts vary greatly in response to the specific needs of the mine they are part of and the geology they are sunk through. For example, in North and South America, smaller shafts are designed to be rectangular in plan view with timber supports. Larger shafts are round in plan and are concrete lined.

Mine shafts may be used for a variety of purposes, including as a means of escape in the event of an emergency underground and allowing for the movement of:

- People
- Materials
- Mine services (such as compressed air, water, backfill, power, communications and fuel)
- Ventilation air
- Broken rock (in the form of payable ore, or non payable waste)
- Or any combination of the above

When the top of the excavation is the ground surface, it is referred to as a shaft; when the top of the excavation is underground, it is called a winze or a sub-shaft. Small shafts may be excavated upwards from within an existing mine as long as there is access at the bottom, in which case they are called raises.

A shaft may be either vertical or inclined (between 80 and 90 degrees to the horizontal), although most modern mine shafts are vertical. If access exists at the bottom of the proposed shaft, and ground conditions allow, then raise boring may be used to excavate the shaft from the bottom up; such shafts are called borehole shafts.

Following the Hartley Colliery disaster where the single shaft at the mine became blocked, the United Kingdom made single shaft mines illegal in 1862, establishing the practice that all underground mines must have "a second means of egress". Many other global mining jurisdictions have adopted this rule and shafts are therefore often found in pairs (although there are multiple alternative methods of providing a second means of egress).

Currently, the deepest continuous single-lift mine shaft in the world is the main shaft at South Deep Mine in South Africa, owned by Gold Fields Limited, which has a depth of 2991 meters. Along with its twin ventilation shafts, it took ten years to sink and equip.

== Parts of a mine shaft ==
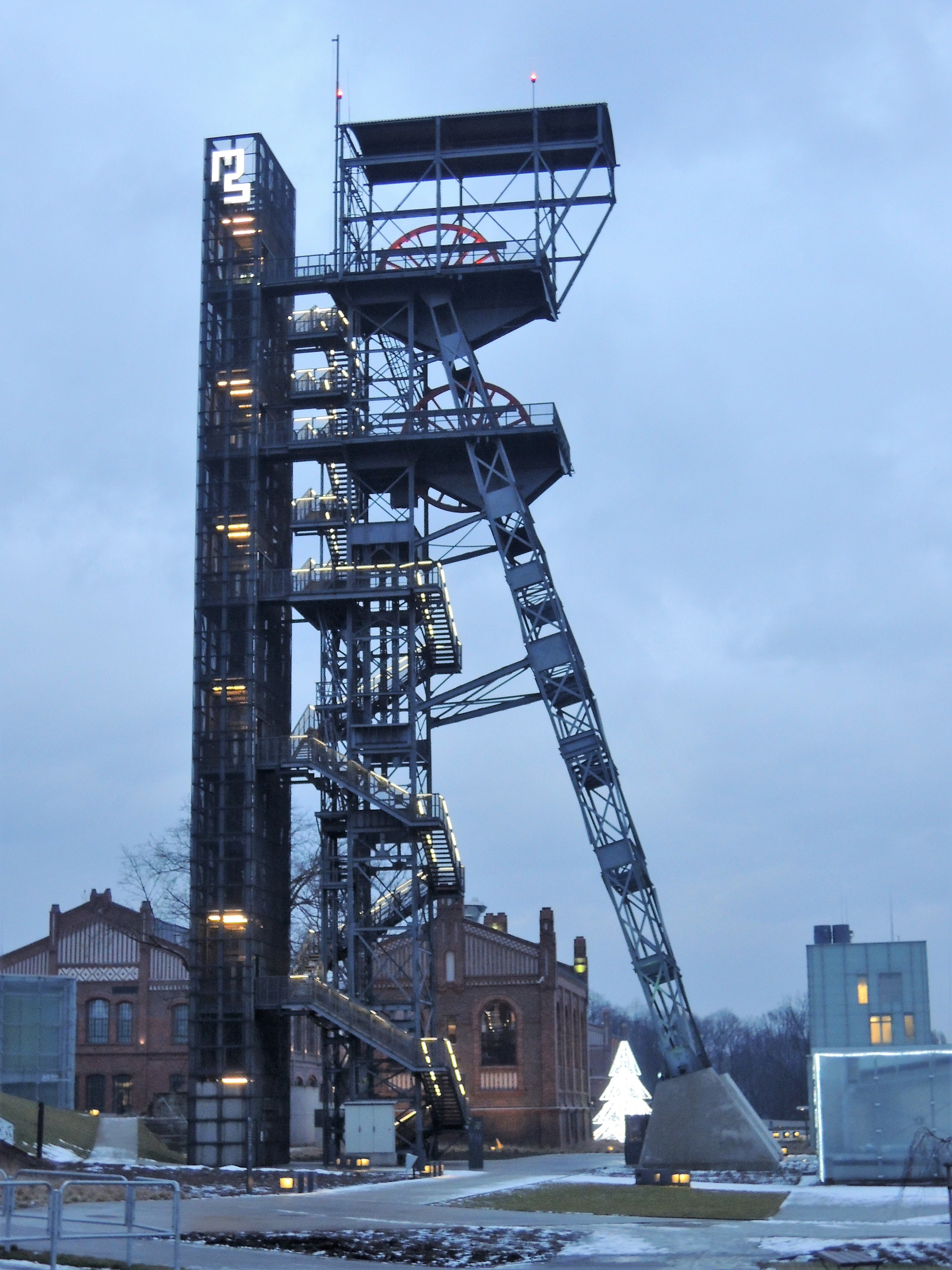
Mine Headframe Warszawa, Katowice. Currently functioning as observation tower and part of the Silesian Museum

The most visible feature of a traditionally-built mine shaft is the headframe (or winding tower, poppet head or pit head) which stands above the shaft. Depending on the type of hoist (or winder) used, the top of the headframe will either house a hoist motor or a sheave wheel (with the hoist motor mounted on the ground). The headframe will also typically contain bins for storing ore being transferred to the processing facility.

At ground level beneath and around the headframe is the Shaft Collar (also called the Bank or Deck), which provides the foundation necessary to support the weight of the headframe and provides a means for workers, materials and services to enter and exit the shaft. Collars are usually massive reinforced concrete structures with more than one level. If the shaft is used for mine ventilation, a plenum space or casing is incorporated into the collar to ensure the proper flow of air into and out of the mine.

Beneath the collar the part of the shaft which continues into the ground is called the shaft barrel.

At locations where the shaft barrel meets horizontal workings there is a shaft station (or inset) which allows men, materials and services to enter and exit the shaft. From the station tunnels (drifts, galleries or levels) extend towards the ore body, sometimes for many kilometers. The lowest shaft station is most often the point where rock leaves the mine levels and is transferred to the shaft, if so a loading pocket is excavated on one side of the shaft at this location to allow transfer facilities to be built.

Beneath the lowest shaft station the shaft continues on for some distance; this area is referred to as the shaft bottom. A tunnel called a ramp typically connects the bottom of the shaft with the rest of the mine. This ramp often contains the mine's water handling facility, called the sump, as water will naturally flow to the lowest point in the mine.

== Shaft lining ==
Schematic of headframe: 1. hoist; 2. cable; 3. wheel; 4. sheer; 5. false edge; 6. hoistroom; 7. mineshaft

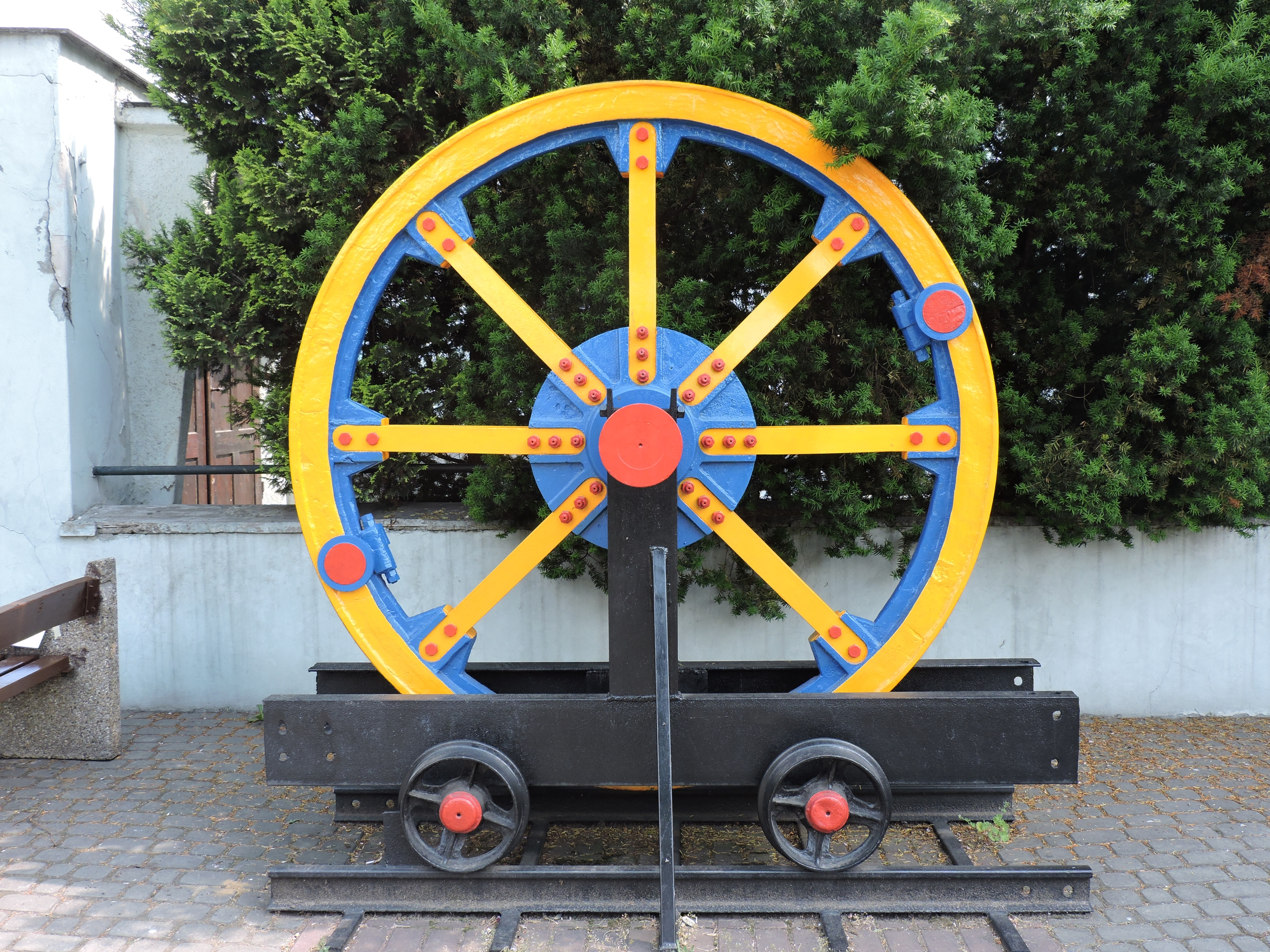
Sheave wheel of 1 Maja Coal Mine in Wodzisław Śląski

Many (although not all) shafts are lined following excavation and the installation of temporary ground support. The shaft lining performs several functions; it is first and foremost a safety feature preventing loose or unstable rock from falling into the shaft, then a place for shaft sets to bolt into, and lastly a smooth surface to minimise resistance to airflow for ventilation.

Final choice of shaft lining is dependent on the geology of the rock which the shaft passes through, some shafts have several liners sections as required Where shafts are sunk in very competent rock there may be no requirement for lining at all, or just the installation of welded mesh and rock bolts. The material of choice for shaft lining is mass concrete which is poured behind shaft forms in lifts of 6 m as the shaft advances (gets deeper).

Shotcrete, fibrecrete, brick, cast iron tubing, and precast concrete segments have all been used at one time or another. Additionally, the use of materials like bitumen and even squash balls have been required by specific circumstances. In extreme cases, particularly when sinking through halite, composite liners consisting of two or more materials may be required.

The shaft liner does not reach right to the bottom of the shaft during sinking, but lags behind by a fixed distance. This distance is determined by the methodology of excavation and the design thickness of the permanent liner. To ensure the safety of persons working on the shaft bottom temporary ground support is installed, usually consisting of welded mesh and rock bolts. The installation of the temporary ground support (called bolting) is among the most physically challenging parts of the shaft sinking cycle as bolts must be installed using pneumatic powered rock drills.

For this reason, and to minimise the number of persons on the shaft bottom a number of projects have successfully switched to shotcrete for this temporary lining. Research and development in this area is focusing on the robotic application of shotcrete and the commercialisation of thin sprayed polymer liners.

== Shaft compartments ==
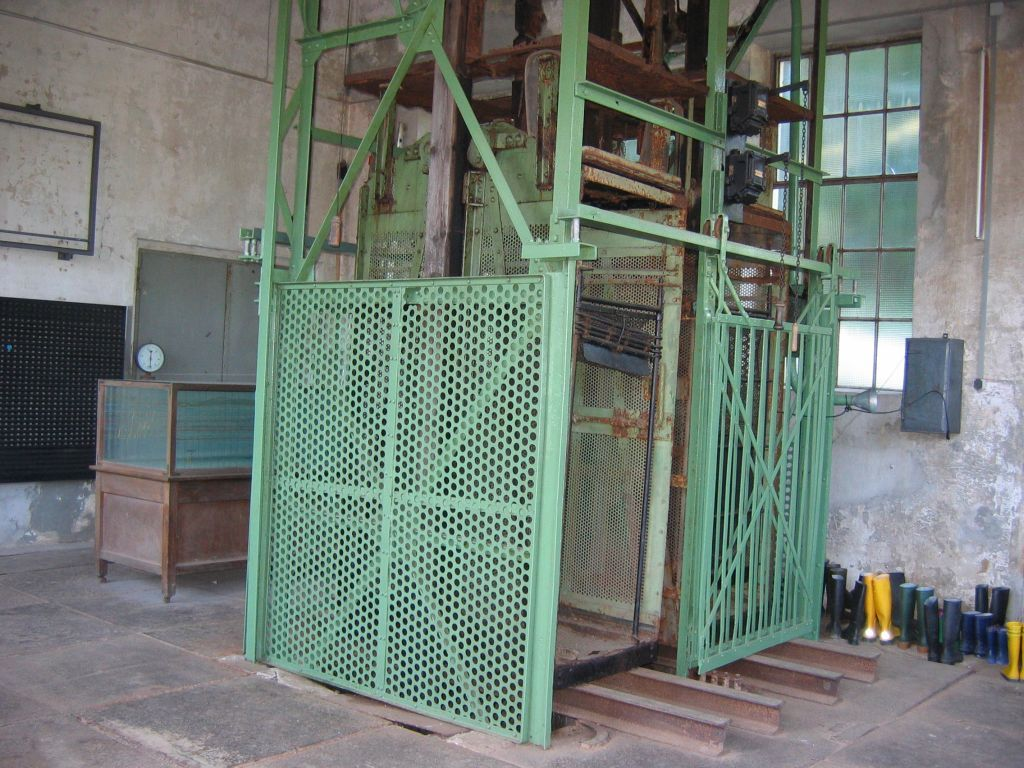
Typical mine cage, located in Harzbergbau, Germany

Where the shaft is to be used for hoisting it is frequently split into multiple compartments by shaft sets, these may be made of either timber or steel. Vertical members in a shaft set are called guides, horizontal members are called buntons. For steel shaft guides, the main two options are hollow structural sections and top hat sections. Top hat sections offer a number of advantages over hollow structural sections including simpler installation, improved corrosion resistance and increased stiffness. Mine conveyances run on the guides in a similar way to how a steel roller coaster runs on its rails, both having wheels which keep them securely in place.

Some shafts do not use guide beams but instead utilize steel wire rope (called guide rope) kept in tension by massive weights at shaft bottom called cheese weights (because of their resemblance to a truckle or wheel of cheese) as these are easier to maintain and replace.

The largest compartment is typically used for the mine cage, a conveyance used for moving workers and supplies below the surface, which is suspended from the hoist on steel wire rope. It functions in a similar manner to an elevator. Cages may be single-, double-, or rarely triple-deck, always having multiple redundant safety systems in case of unexpected failure.

The second compartment is used for one or more skips, used to hoist ore to the surface. Smaller mining operations use a skip mounted underneath the cage, rather than a separate device, while some large mines have separate shafts for the cage and skips. The third compartment is used for an emergency exit; it may house an auxiliary cage or a system of ladders. An additional compartment houses mine services such as high voltage cables and pipes for transfer of water, compressed air or diesel fuel.

A second reason to divide the shaft is for ventilation. One or more of the compartments discussed above may be used for air intake, while others may be used for exhaust. Where this is the case a steel or concrete wall called a brattice is installed between the two compartments to separate the air flow. At many mines there are one or more complete additional separate auxiliary shafts with separate head gear and cages.

== Shaft construction ==
The lowest point in a sinking shaft is known as the "shaft bottom". Shaft projects differ from some other forms of mine development in that all activities that take place on the shaft bottom become part of the critical path for the project schedule. The infrastructure required to sink a shaft is referred to as "the sinking set-up".

It is typical for progress (the "sinking rate") in the sinking phase (that is excavation, ground support and lining) of a shaft project to follow a learning curve as the project team repeats the same series of activities over and over in what is called "the sinking cycle", eventually approaching the theoretical maximum rate for that sinking set up over time. The use of experienced shaft sinkers is necessary to reduce the length of this learning curve and thus the duration of the project as much as possible.

Key to a successful shaft sinking project are:

- Getting the various components of the sinking set-up correct and installed at the right time.
- Having experienced people involved from as early in the project as possible
- Using the available time on the shaft bottom as efficiently as possible.

Although significant emphasis is placed on the rate of progress of a project sinking cycle by shaft sinkers, sinking is only one of a number of phases in the conventional construction of a new shaft, as follows;

- Box Cut Excavation. A box cut is a large square or rectangular excavation typically completed using earthmoving equipment down to bedrock, inside which the shaft collar will be constructed. Having the loads imposed by the collar, headframe and hoisting plant transferred into solid rock is necessary to prevent unplanned subsidence. Where the depth of bedrock is too great to for a box cut to be economically viable, or the bedrock is not strong enough, civil engineering techniques such as diaphragm walls or concrete piles may be used to create a deep foundation instead.
- Pre-Sink. The pre-sink is the excavation and support of the first 60 – 100 metres of the shaft barrel, often completed with smaller equipment such as handheld, pneumatic drilling equipment to drill holes for basting and ground support and mini-excavators for mucking. During the pre-sink, hoisting of muck and equipment is usually performed by a mobile crane on the surface. It is necessary to sink this part of the shaft first so that the Galloway, a multi-level working platform may be installed with enough vertical distance to the shaft bottom that it will not be damaged by fly rock during blasting.
- Collar Construction. From the bottom of the box cut, the shaft collar is constructed bottom up in a planned series of concrete pours.
- Galloway (Sinking Stage) Construction & Installation. The Galloway (also known as a Sinking Stage or Scaffold) is a multi-level working platform, suspended in the shaft from winches located on the surface. The Galloway allows sinkers to efficiently work on different levels as required by the various tasks of the sinking cycle. It is typical for the Galloway to be constructed off to one side of the shaft and lowered into the pre-sink with a crane in as complete a state as possible. Once in place, the Galloway is "chaired" (suspended from the shaft collar) while the headframe is built above, often protected by a bulkhead.
- Headframe & Hoist House Construction. With the collar constructed and the Galloway installed the headframe and hoist (or winder) houses may be constructed and the hoist and winch ropes installed. Headframes may be either steel or concrete and their design will determine how they are constructed. The Galloway is moved in the shaft by means of winches, which move slowly and are rated for significant loads, while the sinking buckets (or kibbles) are moved in the shaft by the sinking hoist, which moves quickly and is rated for less load than the winches. To protect the hoist(s) and winches and the sensitive electronics which are used to control their operation they are normally installed inside a build called a hoist (or winder) house.
- Commissioning Sinking Set-Up. The Sinking set-up must then be commissioned to ensure that all parts are operating as planned.
- Full Sink. The activities of the sinking cycle (excavation, installation of temporary ground support, placement of the shaft lining and extending shaft services) all take place in this phase of construction. In a shaft where there are to be multiple working levels, shaft stations and station stubs (short lengths of a horizontal tunnel leading away from the station) will be developed by the sinkers on the way down. As the equipment to excavate these stations must be small enough to fit through the openings in the Galloway, the rate of advance in developing the station stubs is typically low, compared to what can be achieved with full-size mining equipment, so station stubs are typically kept as short as possible.
- Shaft Equipping & Headframe Changeover. Once the shaft reaches the final design depth, the shaft is stripped of any temporary services, the Galloway cut up or modified to suit the installation of the permanent shaft set-up, the shaft sets (if required) installed and the headframe / winders modified to allow for permanent hoisting. Any permanent conveyances will be installed at this stage.
- Commissioning Permanent Set Up. The Permanent set-up must then be commissioned to ensure that all parts are operating as planned before being handed over to the new owner.

As with the depth and design of shafts, significant variations may exist in this sequence depending on local conditions. For example, shafts in the Canadian Shield generally do not need a deep and complex shaft collar since the bedrock is both strong and close to the surface. This reduces the amount of time required to establish the shaft collar.

Traditionally, sinking contractors would build a temporary headframe for the sinking set-up, which would then be dismantled to make way for a permanent headframe. With the growth in complexity and duration of shaft sinking projects over time it has become more common to incorporate more of the permanent shaft set-up into the sinking phase. This results in a reduced overall project duration, as for example, if the service piping used to sink the shaft does not need to be stripped out to make way for permanent piping.

With the advancements made in raise boring technology, raise borers have been used to create a pilot hole for shaft sinking, where access exists at the bottom of the new shaft, in this case the sinking phase is dedicated to enlarging this pilot hole to full diameter (a process usually called "slashing"). This methodology can be considerably faster than full face sinking as muck (waste rock) from sinking falls down the pilot hole and is handled using existing mine infrastructure off critical path.

== See also ==
- Drift mining – Mining of a mineral deposit by underground methods
- Engine shaft – Mine shaft used for the purpose of pumping
- Headframe – Structural frame above an underground mine shaft
- Man engine – Vertical transport system used in mines
- Raise borer – Machine used in underground mining
- Salt-concrete – Building material used in salt mines
- Underground hard-rock mining – Mining techniques used to excavate hard minerals and gems
- Underground soft-rock mining – Mining techniques used to extract minerals/materials from sedimentary rock
- Glossary of coal mining terminology
- Repurposing old mine shafts for energy storage purposes – Large scale electricity supply management
