= Beaconsfield Mine collapse =

2006 mining accident in Tasmania, Australia

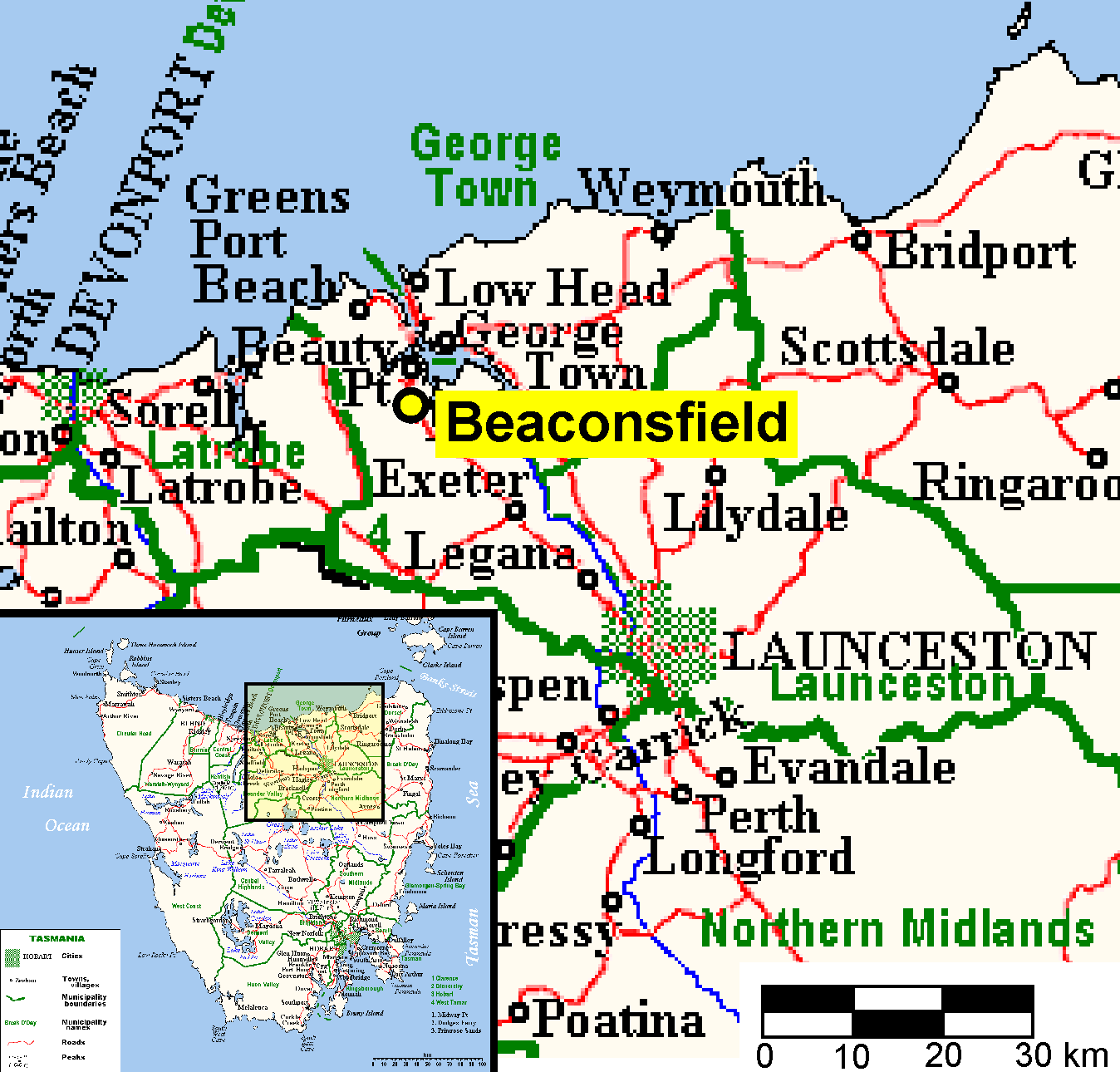
Location of Beaconsfield

The Beaconsfield gold mine collapsed on 25 April 2006 in Beaconsfield, Tasmania, Australia. Of the seventeen people who were in the mine at the time, fourteen escaped immediately following the collapse, one miner (Larry Knight) was killed, while the remaining two (Brant Webb and Todd Russell) were found alive on the sixth day by miners Pat Ball and Steve Saltmarsh. Webb and Russell were rescued on 9 May 2006, two weeks after being trapped nearly 1 kilometre (0.62 mi) below the surface.

== Mine collapse ==
At 9:26 pm (Australian Eastern Standard Time) on 25 April 2006, a small earthquake triggered an underground rockfall at the Beaconsfield gold mine in northern Tasmania. Geoscience Australia said that the earthquake had a magnitude of 2.3, at a shallow depth at coordinates 41.190°S 146.840°E. Earlier speculation had suggested that mine blasting had caused the collapse. Three of the miners working underground at the time were trapped, and early reports suggested that 14 miners who were underground at the time had managed to scramble to safety. The mining company, Beaconsfield Mine Joint Venture, released a press statement saying they held "grave concerns for the three miners' wellbeing".

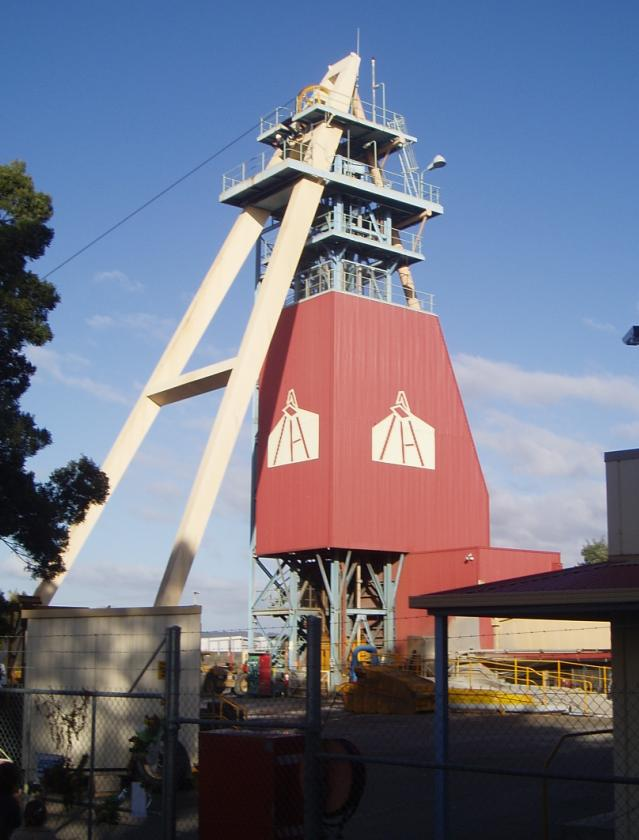
Beaconsfield mine

Larry Knight (44), Brant Webb (37) and Todd Russell (34) were the three miners who remained unaccounted for. Knight had been killed in the initial rockfall, but Webb and Russell were still alive, trapped in part of the vehicle in which they had been working at the time of the collapse, known as a teleloader or telehandler. They were in a basket at the end of the telehandler's arm, where they had been applying steel mesh to a barricade prior to backfilling a stope. It was initially misreported that the two miners were saved by a slab of rock that fell on top of the basket, but in a Channel 9 exclusive interview broadcast on 21 May, Webb and Russell stated that this was incorrect and that the "ceiling" above them was merely thousands of individual unstable rocks precariously packed together.

The cage was partially filled with rock, and the men were partially buried under some rubble. Webb seemed to have been knocked unconscious for a short time, and Russell's lower body was completely buried. When Webb awoke, the two were able to free themselves and each other from the fallen rock by cutting through their clothes and boots, which were stuck in the rock, using utility knives.

The miners were able to survive by drinking groundwater, seeping through the rock overhead, which they had collected in their helmets. Webb also had a muesli bar with him, which he offered to cut in half and share with Russell. The men initially agreed to wait 24 hours to eat it, but they continually extended the time, until they decided to eat it on 29 April. They then ate small pieces of the bar at a time, to make it last as long as possible. However, Russell later lost a large portion of his half of the bar when it fell out of his pocket.

== Rescue effort ==
On 30 April a remote-controlled earth mover began clearing the rock underground. On the morning of 27 April at 7:22 am, the corpse of one of the miners was found in the pile of rock. At around 8:00 pm, the body was retrieved and was identified as Larry Paul Knight, 44, of Launceston. He was the driver of the telehandler.

Rescue workers did not proceed further through the rubble past the back end of the telehandler because it was unsafe, instead choosing to blast a new tunnel across from the main decline to the side tunnel, aiming to come out in front of the telehandler. On 29 April they began blasting a new tunnel, detonating at least six large explosive charges to form the tunnel. The blasts dislodged rock inside the cage of the telehandler, which Webb and Russell attempted to clear, although as the blasts came closer, rock was dislodged faster than they could clear it. Russell recorded the date and time of each blast on his clothing, so that if they died as a result of the blasting, the rescuers would know that they had been alive prior to a particular blast. Both Webb and Russell also wrote letters to their families on their clothing. The two men sang "The Gambler" by Kenny Rogers (the only song they both knew) in order to keep up their spirits, as they waited for successive blasts to occur in the tunnel. At about 5.45 pm on 30 April two rescuers, Pat Ball (the underground manager) and Steve Saltmarsh (the mine foreman) entered the 925 level to the rockfall and yelled out. Webb and Russell began yelling, "We're in here!", and this was how the rescuers found out they were alive.

Later, one rescuer found a direct route to the trapped miners, across the rubble in the side tunnel, and was able to get close enough to the basket of the telehandler to shake Russell's hand. This was where a remote-controlled loader had got to the back of the teleloader, but this route was deemed unsafe for rescuing them. Webb and Russell themselves did not want the rescuers to attempt to reach them through the rubble, because to do so would require them to cut through the wire on the side of the cage, which was under considerable pressure from the rock above. The two men were afraid that cutting the cage would cause it to collapse.

Rescuers immediately halted blasting in the access tunnel, and instead drilled a smaller hole through the approximately 14.5 metres (48 ft) of rock between the head of the access tunnel and the part of the side tunnel where the miners were trapped. Webb and Russell directed the work by listening to the sound of the drilling and judging the direction. The hole was about 90 millimetres (3.5 in) in diameter. A PVC pipe was used to line the hole, which was used to deliver fresh water, food and communications equipment to the men.

On 1 May 2006, rescuers were still 12 metres (39 ft) from the miners. They were also later sent a digital camera, a torch, dry clothes, magazines, iPods including music from the Foo Fighters and Kevin Bloody Wilson (upon request), deodorant and toothpaste. They also received letters from their families, and were able to write letters in return. In one letter to his wife, Russell wrote "It's not much of a room we have up here." Russell asked for the previous Saturday's newspaper because he said he would be looking for a new job, after joking about losing his current one for lazing about. One mine official questioned why Russell would want to look for a job, since he already had one. Russell, in a later interview, said that he had replied, "I told him to stick it up his ..." They were also sent medical supplies, with which Webb was able to treat the injuries to Russell's leg, with advice from paramedics. It was also on 1 May that the two men asked about Larry Knight, and rescuers told them that he had been found dead.

The rescue effort by drilling was put off on Monday 1 May because of the danger of another collapse. It was decided to use a raise borer anchored in concrete, with the last load of the concrete being delivered before dawn on Wednesday, 3 May 2006. The machine cut a horizontal tunnel 1 metre (3 ft 3 in) in diameter. Later that day it was announced that the drilling to go the final 12 metres (39 ft) would commence within hours. At about 6:45 pm, drilling of a 20 cm pilot hole for the raise borer commenced. Using the normal procedure for this machinery, a pilot hole was drilled, for the larger diameter borer to follow. This took more than three days to complete. According to Beaconsfield mine manager Matthew Gill, the quartz rock which was drilled through was five times harder than concrete. The drill was capable of drilling through it at 1 metre (3 ft 3 in) per hour, but it was going much more slowly because of the danger of further rock falls, at a rate of around 0.46 metres (1 ft 6 in) per hour.

Drilling of the rescue tunnel commenced on Thursday 4 May at about 8:00 pm guided by the completed pilot hole. It was gouged out to 1 metre (3 ft 3 in) and was planned to come up underneath the men's cage after passing through 16 metres (52 ft) of rock. The last phase was to involve a miner using hand tools to create an opening whilst lying on his back.

As at 7:00 am, on Saturday, 6 May, the raise borer had drilled about 11 metres (36 ft) of the 14.5-metre (48 ft) rescue tunnel. The mine decided on the shortened route late on Friday night. The major drilling operation was completed by 6:00 pm on Saturday, with only a few metres remaining to reach the trapped miners. Several hours work dismantling and removing the boring machine from the escape tunnel were required before the final phase of the rescue commenced.

On 7 May the rescuers reached a belt of hard rock that they found difficult to penetrate. As the jack hammers they were using had little effect, they reverted to using low-impact charges. On 8 May the horizontal tunnel was completed, with rescuers beginning tunnelling upwards in the short vertical tunnel, since the horizontal tunnel had been dug lower than the level of the miners. At about 9:30 pm a probe passed through the rock below where the miners were located, which indicated there was only 1 metre (3 ft 3 in) between them, including 400 millimetres (16 in) of hard rock.

After 14 nights, at 4:27 am, rescuers Glenn Burns, Donovan Lightfoot and Royce Gill finally reached the men, one of them yelling "I can see your light" when he broke through the ground which was separating him from the miners, to which the miners replied "I can see your light too". Webb was freed at 4:47 am on 9 May, followed by Russell at 4:54 am They were driven up the spiral decline of the mine, arriving at a medical station at the base of the vertical shaft from the surface at about 5:30 am. They were checked by a doctor, and then sent up the lift towards the surface. About 30 metres (98 ft) from the surface, they got out of their wheelchairs, which were moved to the rear of the lift so as to be out of sight. At 5:58 am both men walked out of the lift cage unaided "... punching their fists in the air to the cheers of the Beaconsfield crowds who had gathered outside the mine gate. Wearing their fluoro jackets and lit miner's helmets, the men switched their safety tags to 'safe' on the mine out board before embracing family members who rushed to hug them." Both were then transported to Launceston General Hospital in nearby Launceston just after 6:00 am local time. Russell had an injured knee, and a damaged vertebra which put pressure on his sciatic nerve, while Webb had injuries to both knees, several vertebrae, and his neck.

== Media coverage and later developments ==
Hundreds of journalists arrived in the town to cover the story, transforming Beaconsfield into a busy town. Some comedians joked at the time that the reason why the rescue took so long was because cables and wires being used by broadcasters at the site were blocking the path.

The then Prime Minister of Australia, John Howard, said his message to the miners would be "Everybody is with you, mate".

On the afternoon of 7 May, journalist Richard Carleton suffered a heart attack at a press conference while at the mine. He was transported to hospital, before being pronounced dead by a doctor.

Less than six hours after they were rescued, Todd Russell joined more than a thousand mourners at Larry Knight's funeral. The funeral had been postponed several times in the hope that both rescued miners could attend, before finally settling on Tuesday 9 May. Russell attended after being discharged from Launceston General Hospital in time.

When Dave Grohl of the Foo Fighters heard of the miners' request to have the band's music sent down on MP3 players, he issued a personal message via fax to them indicating he would meet them for a beer. Grohl's note read, in part, "Though I'm halfway around the world right now, my heart is with you both, and I want you to know that when you come home, there's two tickets to any Foos show, anywhere, and two cold beers waiting for you. Deal?" In October 2006, one of the miners took up his offer, joining Grohl for a drink after the Foo Fighters' acoustic concert at the Sydney Opera House. Since then, Foo Fighters have written an instrumental tribute song called "Ballad of the Beaconsfield Miners", appearing on their 2007 album Echoes, Silence, Patience & Grace.

Following a meeting the Australian Workers' Union held with the miners from Beaconsfield on 15 May, they reported that no miner could be found who had been given workplace safety training, miners were unhappy with reductions in the amount of cement used to close in exploited parts of the mine, supports had been removed from lower parts of the mine, and mesh intended to prevent rock collapse was known to be ineffective.

Interest in gaining media deals with both survivors culminated with Oprah Winfrey's production company Harpo expressing interest. Interest from the United States was particularly strong given two January 2006 mining disasters in West Virginia (the Sago Mine disaster and Aracoma Alma Mine accident) which resulted in the deaths of 15 miners.

Ten News reported that the survivors were offered $3 million each, and Channel Nine boss Eddie McGuire attended the pub where the residents of Beaconsfield were celebrating the rescue. During The Footy Show, they crossed live to a special event held in Beaconsfield where both miners appeared and were questioned by McGuire. The Daily Telegraph revealed that the Nine Network secured a deal for $2.6 million, for a 2-hour special on the night of Sunday 21 May entitled "The Great Escape".

The story was extended by the continued stream of media reports detailing the ordeal, such as Enough Rope with Andrew Denton's interview with one of the rescuers, Paul Featherstone. Adelaide band Unitopia recorded a single, "321" (often misquoted in the media as "321 Hours"), with Webb, Russell and their wives singing backing vocals.

Satirist and comic performer Dan Ilic wrote and performed a show at the Melbourne Fringe Festival based on the disaster and the media's reaction to it, titled Beaconsfield: The Musical. The piece was originally titled Beaconsfield: A Musical in A-Flat Minor, but Ilic changed the title 'out of respect'. The show was renamed Beaconsfield: A Musical in No Particular Key in response to the media uproar over the initial name.

In June 2011, the Herald Sun revealed that Channel 9 would be producing a mini-series about the incident. Lachy Hulme was cast to play Russell, while Shane Jacobson was cast in the role of Webb. The mini-series eventually became a telemovie called Beaconsfield, which was first broadcast on 22 April 2012 to an audience of over 1.6 million.

On 10 November 2026, Russell died at the age of 54. He had been receiving hospital treatment since 2025 and, on 3 November 2026, announced that he was leaving hospital after eight and a half months, with no further medical options available, to spend his remaining time with his loved ones. Russell had served as a firefighter and chief of the Beaconsfield Fire Brigade before retiring in 2026.

== See also ==
- 2010 Copiapó mining accident
- Tham Luang cave rescue
