= Robert Hunt (scientist) =

British scientist (1807–1887)

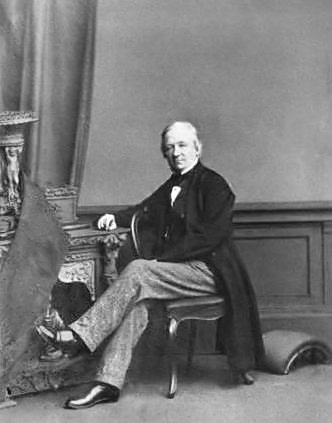
Robert Hunt

Robert Hunt (6 September 1807 – 17 October 1887) was a British mineralogist, as well as an antiquarian, an amateur poet, and an early pioneer of photography. He was born at Devonport, Plymouth and died in London on 17 October 1887.

== Life and work ==
=== Early life ===
Hunt's father, a naval officer, drowned while Robert was a youth. Robert began to study in London for the medical profession, but ill-health caused him to return to settle in Cornwall. In 1829, he published The Mount’s Bay; a descriptive poem ... and other pieces but received little critical or financial success.

In 1840, Hunt became secretary to the Royal Cornwall Polytechnic Society at Falmouth. Here he met Robert Were Fox, and carried on some physical and chemical investigations with him.

=== Career ===
Hunt was appointed Professor of Mechanical Science, Government School of Mines.

In 1845, he accepted the invitation of Sir Henry de la Beche to become keeper of mining records at the Museum of Economic (afterwards Practical) Geology, and when the school of mines was established in 1851 he lectured for two years on mechanical science, and afterwards for a short time on experimental physics.

He was elected a Fellow of the Royal Statistical Society in 1855.

In 1858, he founded, with the Royal Cornwall Polytechnic Society, The Miners Association.

His principal work was the collection and editing of the Mineral Statistics of the United Kingdom, and this he continued to the date of his retirement (1883), when the mining record office was transferred to the Home Office.

He was elected as a Fellow of the Royal Society in 1852. In 1884, he published a large volume on British Mining in which the subject was dealt with very fully from a historical as well as a practical point of view. He also edited the fifth and some later editions of Andrew Ure's Dictionary of Arts, Mines and Manufactures.

=== Other interests ===
Hunt had many interests outside of mineralogy and published several popular books on various topics. He was an early pioneer in photography, a poet, and an antiquarian with a keen interest in folklore. Following Daguerre's development of the daguerreotype in 1839, Hunt took up photography with great zeal. Just two years later, in 1841, he published his Manual of Photography, which was the first English treatise on the subject. Hunt also experimented generally on the action of light, and published Researches on Light in 1844. He also developed the actinograph in 1845.

Hunt had a long-abiding interest in poetry as well. He regularly wrote and published poetry and tried in the 1830s to pursue a career as a playwright. In 1848, Hunt published the hugely ambitious work The Poetry of Science, which outlined most of the important discoveries that had been made in natural philosophy until that time, while also communicating the aesthetic aspects of science to the general reader. In it, Hunt was attempting to make it clear that science and objective discovery were subjects worthy of poetic language.

He also collected and wrote Popular Romances of the West of England (1865), which included a record of myths and legends of old Cornwall, and proved so popular that it went through a number of editions.

=== Death and legacy ===
Hunt died in London on 17 October 1887. A mineralogical museum at Redruth Mining School was established in his memory, but this closed in 1950, and the minerals were transferred to the School of Metalliferous Mining, now the Camborne School of Mines.

== See also ==
- Chrysotype – Photographic process invented by John Herschel
