= Mining Institute =

Mining Institute may refer to:

- Moscow State Mining University, Russia, also known as the Moscow Mining Institute
- Saint Petersburg Mining Institute, Russia, also known as the Mining Academy
- Mining Institute of Cornwall, United Kingdom
- North of England Institute of Mining and Mechanical Engineers, United Kingdom, known locally as the Mining Institute
- Geological and Mining Institute of Spain, a research institute in Madrid, Spain
