= 2011–12 Cornwall Hockey Association Cup =

2011–12 CHA Cup
Tournament details
- Teams: 34

Final positions
- Champions: Truro (Men's), Newquay (Ladies)
- Runner-up: Penzance (Men's), Falmouth (Ladies)

The 2011–12 Cornwall Hockey Association Cup was the 2011–12 season of the Cornwall Hockey Association Knockout Cup, known as the Cornwall Cup or CHA Cup. The CHA Cup is the flagship competition organised by the Cornwall Hockey Association, contested by senior male and female hockey teams in the county of Cornwall.

A total of 34 teams representing 13 clubs will compete in the competition (a reduction of 1 compared to the 2010-11 competition), and will begin on Sunday 25 September 2011 with the Ladies Cup, Preliminary round. The competition culminated with the Ladies Cup final on Sunday 15 April 2012 at Penzance HC. Truro HC and Newquay HC were the respective winners of the Men's and Ladies Cups.

== Format ==
Both the Men's Cup and Ladies Cup were contested as knockout competitions, with a single defeat eliminating the losing team. Teams which were defeated in, or prior to, Round 1 of the Cup competition qualified for the 2011–12 Cornwall Hockey Association Plate.

The 2011–12 season saw the draws for all rounds of the competitions made prior to the start of the tournament, thereby allowing teams to analyse their potential opponents in any subsequent rounds. This system was previously used in the 2009–10 season, but dropped for the 2010–11 competition in favour of a system of drawing each round following the completion of the previous one. As the trial proved unsuccessful, the system reverted for 2011–12.

== Teams and calendar ==
=== Men's Cup ===
Of the 18 teams eligible for the Men's Cup, 15 entered the competition, representing eight clubs.

Club	Teams eligible	Teams entered	Notes
Bodmin	2	2	
Bude	2	2	
Camborne SoM	3	2	Camborne SoM elected not to enter their 3rd XI
Caradon	1	1	
Duchy	2	1	Duchy HC elected only to enter their 2nd XI
Penzance	3	2	Penzance HC elected not to enter their 3rd XI
St. Austell	1	1	St. Austell formally entered the competition, but folded prior to the commencement of matches.
Truro	5	5	
Total	18	15	

Fourteen of the fifteen competing clubs were entered into Round 1 of the competition, with the defending champions, Truro, being awarded a bye to the quarter-finals.

Round	Main date	Teams involved	Winners from previous round	New entries
Round 1	30 Oct 11	14	-	14
Quarter-final	29 Jan 12	8	7	1
Semi-final	18 Mar 12	4	4	0
Final	15 Apr 12	2	2	0

=== Ladies Cup ===
Of the 19 teams eligible for the Ladies Cup, all 19 entered the competition representing thirteen clubs.

Club	Teams Eligible	Teams Entered	Notes
Bodmin	1	1	
Bude	2	2	
Callington	1	1	
Camborne SoM	1	1	
Caradon	3	3	
Duchy	1	1	
Falmouth	3	3	
Launceston	1	1	
Newquay	1	1	
Penzance	2	2	
St. Austell	1	1	
Truro	2	2	
Total	19	19	

Of the nineteen competing teams, six were entered into a Preliminary round with the three winners joining the remaining thirteen teams in Round 1. The six teams contesting the preliminary round were those teams ranked lowest based upon their finishing position in the 2010-11 league season.

Round	Main Date	Teams Involved	Winners from previous round	New entries
Preliminary round	25 Sep 11	6	0	6
Round 1	30 Oct 11	16	3	13
Quarter-final	29 Jan 12	8	8	0
Semi-final	18 Mar 12	4	4	0
Final	15 Apr 12	2	2	0

== Results and Fixtures ==
The draw for both the Men's Cup and Ladies' Cup was carried out on 6 June 2011.

=== Men's Cup ===
Round 1
14	Camborne SoM A	5
15	Bude A	3
4	Camborne SoM	5
6	Bude	2
17	Duchy A	5
13	Bodmin A	0
1	Truro	BYE
9	Penzance A
11	Truro B	w.o.
5	Penzance	1
3	Truro A	4
2	Bodmin	w.o.
12	Truro C
10	Caradon	BYE

Quarter-finals
14	Camborne SoM A	1
4	Camborne SoM	9
17	Duchy A	0
1	Truro	8
11	Truro B	2
3	Truro A	5
2	Bodmin	w.o.
10	Caradon

Semi-finals
4	Camborne SoM	1
1	Truro	5
3	Truro A	0
2	Bodmin	1

Final
1	Truro	6
2	Bodmin	1

Caradon were awarded a bye after their opposition club, St. Austell, folded in September 2011.

=== Ladies Cup ===
==== Preliminary round ====
The six lowest ranked teams in the competition (based upon their finishing position in the 2010-11 league season) will contest the preliminary round. The draw was carried out at random. Rankings are shown in parentheses.

Home team	Away team	Result
Launceston [15]	Callington [18]	0 w/o 5
Truro II [16]	Duchy [19]	0 w/o 5
Falmouth III [17]	Caradon III [14]	1–5

==== Main Draw ====
Round 1
19	Duchy	0
1	Falmouth	11
12	Caradon II	1
7	Truro	8
8	Bude II	4
13	Penzance II	2
4	Penzance	w.o.
9	Bodmin
18	Callington	0
10	Camborne SoM	13
2	Newquay	w.o.
14	Caradon III
3	Bude	8
11	St. Austell	0
5	Caradon	10
6	Falmouth II	1

Quarter-finals
1	Falmouth	4
7	Truro	3
8	Bude II	0
4	Penzance	5
10	Camborne SoM	0
2	Newquay	11
3	Bude	3 (aps)
5	Caradon	1

Semi-finals
1	Falmouth	4
4	Penzance	1
2	Newquay	4
3	Bude	1

Final
1	Falmouth	1
2	Newquay	2
