= Bottle Match =

Annual multi-sport varsity rivalry between RSM and CSM

The Bottle Match
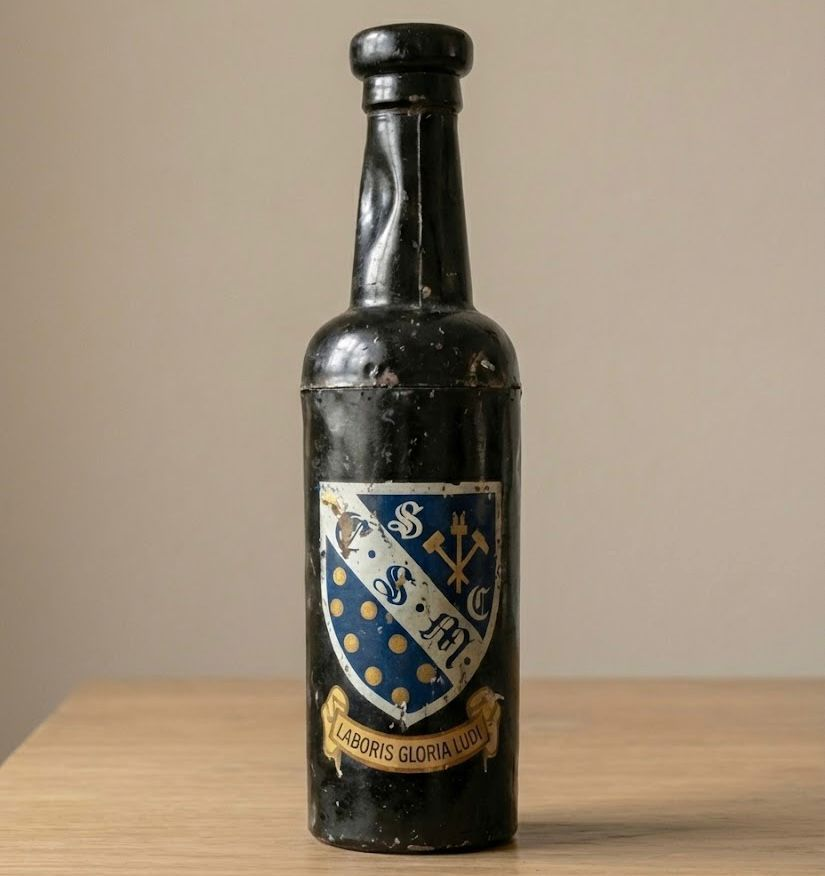
- The Bottle Trophy, showing the CSM crest

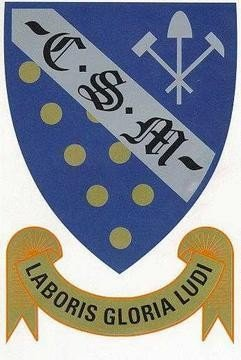
- Royal School of Mines (RSM) Camborne School of Mines (CSM)
- Sport: Rugby Union (Primary), Multi-sport
- Location: London and Penryn
- First meeting: 16 December 1902
- Trophy: The Bottle (Rugby); Wardell Armstrong Trophy (Overall)

Statistics
- Total meetings: 108 (recorded)
- All-time series: RSM leads (45 recorded wins)

The Bottle Match is a historic annual varsity match held every February between the Royal School of Mines (RSM) of Imperial College London and the Camborne School of Mines (CSM) of the University of Exeter. Traditionally played on the third weekend of the month, the rivalry dates back to 16 December 1902, when the first recorded match between the two mining schools took place.

It is widely considered the second-oldest rugby varsity match in the world, following only The Varsity Match between Oxford and Cambridge universities. Furthermore, it is cited as the 14th oldest continuous rugby competition globally. While the centrepiece of the rivalry is the men's rugby union match, the event has expanded into a multi-sport weekend encompassing football, hockey, squash, golf, netball, and lacrosse.

== History ==
=== Origins and Early Years ===
The competition originated as a rugby union match to determine dominance between the UK's two premier mining schools. Originally known as The Miners Cup, the rivalry reflects a long-standing sporting divide between the London-based Royal School of Mines (RSM) and the Cornish Camborne School of Mines (CSM). The first recorded game was a 15-a-side rugby match on 16 December 1902 in London that resulted in an "honourable draw." The match was suspended for seven years during World War I, with play eventually resuming in 1921 for what was dubbed the "Rugby Revival."

=== The Bottle and "Mascot Warfare" ===
The event earned its modern name in 1926 following a famous incident where a group of RSM students "acquired" a three-foot-tall tin advertising bottle from the top of a Bass-Charrington brewery lorry in London. The students decorated the tin bottle with the crests of both mining schools and designated it the official trophy.

This spirit of "mascot warfare" became a hallmark of the rivalry for decades. In 1966, the RSM abducted the CSM’s beloved mascot, a teddy bear named Colonel George (named after a former Principal of the school), who was famously never returned. In a notable retaliatory incident, CSM students "borrowed" the RSM's symbolic Davy Lamp, returning it to the London students filled with concrete and epoxy resin to ensure it could never be lit again. In 2008, the rivalry gained national attention following a BBC report on traditional match-day chants; while controversial to outside observers, the exchange was defended by alumni as a long-standing element of the schools' shared heritage.

=== Institutional Shifts and Scheduling ===
Following a second seven-year suspension during World War II (1939–1945), the logistics of the match shifted to accommodate changing academic calendars. Prior to the war, matches were traditionally held in December on the Friday before Christmas. In the post-war era, the fixture moved to the third Saturday in March, before shifting again in the 1980s to its current slot on the third Saturday in February.

Venues have also evolved alongside institutional restructuring. Historically, London-hosted games were played at Richmond Park. While the Cornish leg of the rotation was long held in Camborne, the incorporation of the Camborne School of Mines into the University of Exeter and its subsequent relocation to the Penryn Campus resulted in the games moving to Penryn Rugby Club. Since 2020, the weekend has expanded into a multi-sport varsity event, where the Wardell Armstrong Trophy is awarded to the school with the most cumulative points across all sports, including football, hockey, and netball, though the "Bottle" remains the exclusive prize for the rugby union match.

== Traditions and Trophies ==
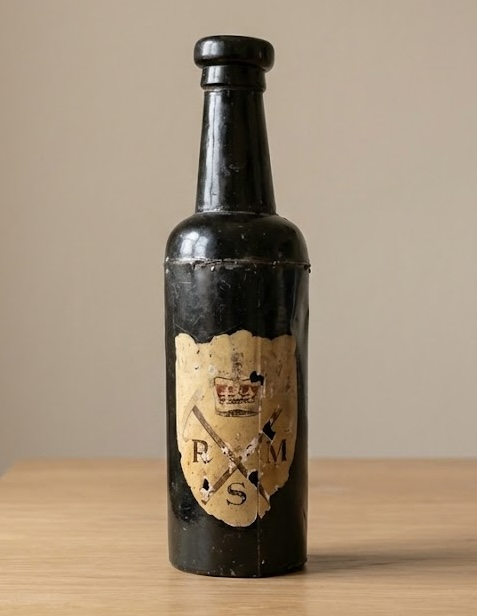
The Bottle Match Trophy, Showing the RSM Crest

The Bottle Match is defined by several long-standing traditions that reflect the unique identity and "mining grit" of the two schools. The rivalry is historically known for its high level of physical play and a boisterous atmosphere that draws alumni from across the globe, particularly from major mining hubs in Australia and South Africa.

A prominent modern tradition held by the Camborne School of Mines involves "Freshman Haircuts." In the week leading up to the fixture, rugby freshmen undergo outlandish and intentionally poorly executed haircuts, such as reverse-mohawks, monk-style fringes, and "Friar Tuck" shaves. While part of the initiation into the rivalry, the tradition has evolved into a significant fundraising drive for the mental health charity Sport in Mind.

Culturally, the trophy itself is protected by a standard of "Mascotry Protection." Unlike many other university mascots in the United Kingdom, which are often subject to "liberation" or theft by rival colleges, the Bottle is traditionally considered off-limits. Its significance to the mining community is such that it is treated as a sacred object within the RSM and CSM unions, and any interference with the trophy by outside parties is strictly discouraged.

Coinciding with the Bottle Match week, CSM hosts its annual 'Barrel Match' for rugby and football. This tradition faces alumni against current students, with a wooden barrel awarded to the winner of the rugby match.

=== Trophies ===
Name	Sport/Event	Description	History / Donor
The Bottle	Rugby Union (Men)	The primary trophy; a 3-ft tin advertising bottle traditionally housed in the Union Bar of the holding institution. Features the crests of both CSM and RSM.	Acquired from a Bass lorry in 1926.
Sharpley Cup	Field Hockey (Men)	A silver cup awarded to the winner of the men's hockey match.	Presented by J.E. Sharpley (RSM) in the 1950s.
Golders Cup	Field Hockey (Women)	A silver cup awarded to the winner of the women's hockey match.	Presented by Golder Associates in the 1990s.
Commemorative Tankards	Rugby Union (Men)	Individual tankards presented to each member of the winning rugby side.	Supported by the Mining Journal; tradition dates to the 1950s.

== Rugby Results (Full Record) ==
Winners are highlighted: RSM (Black/Gold) or CSM (Blue/White).

Match	Year	Winner	Score	Venue	RSM Wins	CSM Wins	Draws
1	1902	Draw	—	Richmond Park, London	0	0	1
1903–1907: Results missing (Matches 2–6)
7	1908	Draw	11–11	Richmond Park, London	0	0	2
—	1909	Match Cancelled (CSM failed to field)			0	0	2
1910: Results missing (Matches 8–9)
10	1911	RSM	3–0	Richmond Park, London	1	0	2
1912–1913: Results missing (Matches 11–12)
Not played due to World War I
13	1921	RSM	13–5	Richmond Park, London	2	0	2
1922–1924: Results missing (Matches 14–16)
17	1925	RSM	11–3	Richmond Athletic Ground, London	3	0	2
18	1926	Draw	8–8	Richmond Athletic Ground, London	3	0	3
19	1927	CSM	13–3	Camborne, Cornwall	3	1	3
20	1928	RSM	11–0	Richmond Athletic Ground, London	4	1	3
1929: Result missing (Match 21)
22	1930	RSM	17–0	Richmond Athletic Ground, London	5	1	3
23	1931	Match Cancelled (RSM failed to field)			5	1	3
24	1932	RSM	20–8	Camborne, Cornwall	6	1	3
1933–1935: Results missing (Matches 25–27)
28	1936	Draw	6–6	Richmond Athletic Ground, London	6	1	4
1937: Result missing (Match 29)
30	1938	RSM	20–8	Camborne, Cornwall	7	1	4
Not played due to World War II
31	1946	CSM	—	Camborne, Cornwall	7	2	4
32	1947	RSM	8–5	Richmond Athletic Ground, London	8	2	4
33	1948	RSM	10–8	Camborne, Cornwall	9	2	4
34	1949	CSM	15–0	Richmond Athletic Ground, London	9	3	4
35	1950	CSM	18–3	Camborne, Cornwall	9	4	4
36	1951	CSM	—	Richmond Athletic Ground, London	9	5	4
37	1952	CSM	—	Camborne, Cornwall	9	6	4
38	1953	CSM	—	Richmond Athletic Ground, London	9	7	4
39	1954	CSM	—	Camborne, Cornwall	9	8	4
40	1955	RSM	3–0	Harlington Sports Ground, London	10	8	4
41	1956	RSM	12–3	Camborne, Cornwall	11	8	4
42	1957	Draw	6–6	Harlington Sports Ground, London	11	8	5
43	1958	RSM	—	Camborne, Cornwall	12	8	5
44	1959	CSM	—	Harlington Sports Ground, London	12	9	5
45	1960	CSM	6–3	Camborne, Cornwall	12	10	5
46	1961	CSM	8–0	Harlington Sports Ground, London	12	11	5
47	1962	CSM	—	Camborne, Cornwall	12	12	5
48	1963	RSM	11–0	Harlington Sports Ground, London	13	12	5
49	1964	RSM	—	Camborne, Cornwall	14	12	5
50	1965	RSM	9–6	Harlington Sports Ground, London	15	12	5
51	1966	CSM	—	Camborne, Cornwall	15	13	5
52	1967	RSM	—	Harlington Sports Ground, London	16	13	5
53	1968	RSM	6–3	Camborne, Cornwall	17	13	5
1969–1971: Results missing (Matches 54–59)
57	1972	CSM	—	Camborne, Cornwall	17	14	5
1973–1976: Results missing (Matches 54–59)
60	1977	RSM	—	Harlington Sports Ground, London	18	14	5
—	1978	Match Abandoned (Snow)		Camborne, Cornwall	18	14	5
61	1979	RSM	—	Camborne, Cornwall	19	14	5
62	1980	RSM	24–0	Harlington Sports Ground, London	20	14	5
63	1981	RSM	9–4	Camborne, Cornwall	20	14	5
64	1982	RSM	—	Harlington Sports Ground, London	21	14	5
1983–1984: Results missing (Matches 65–66)
67	1985	RSM	9-7	County Ground Stadium, Exeter*	22	14	5
68	1986	CSM	14-19	Camborne, Cornwall	22	15	5
69	1987	CSM	—	Harlington Sports Ground, London	22	16	5
70	1988	CSM	—	Camborne, Cornwall	22	17	5
71	1989	RSM	—	Harlington Sports Ground, London	23	17	5
70	1990	CSM	6-4	Camborne, Cornwall, London	22	18	5
73	1991	RSM	4–3	Harlington Sports Ground, London	24	18	5
74	1992	CSM	—	Camborne, Cornwall	24	20	5
75	1993	CSM	—	Harlington Sports Ground, London	24	20	5
76	1994	CSM	10-3	Camborne, Cornwall	24	21	5
77	1995	CSM	8–3	Harlington Sports Ground, London	24	22	5
78	1996	CSM	23–0	Camborne, Cornwall	24	23	5
79	1997	RSM	16–5	Harlington Sports Ground, London	25	21	5
80	1998	RSM	26–0	Camborne, Cornwall	26	23	5
81	1999	RSM	30–10	Harlington Sports Ground, London	27	23	5
82	2000	RSM	22–10	Camborne, Cornwall	28	23	5
83	2001	RSM	—	Harlington Sports Ground, London	29	23	5
84	2002	RSM	29–17	Camborne, Cornwall	30	23	5
85	2003	RSM	12–5	Harlington Sports Ground, London	31	23	5
86	2004	RSM	22–10	Camborne, Cornwall	32	23	5
87	2005	RSM	17–15	Harlington Sports Ground, London	33	23	5
88	2006	RSM	29–11	Penryn, Cornwall	34	23	5
89	2007	CSM	5–3	Harlington Sports Ground, London	34	24	5
90	2008	RSM	13–10	Penryn, Cornwall	35	24	5
91	2009	RSM	14–10	Harlington Sports Ground, London	36	24	5
92	2010	CSM	13–0	Penryn, Cornwall	36	25	5
93	2011	RSM	25–20	Harlington Sports Ground, London	37	25	5
94	2012	RSM	22–0	Penryn, Cornwall	38	25	5
95	2013	RSM	24–8	Harlington Sports Ground, London	39	25	5
96	2014	Draw	6–6	Penryn, Cornwall	39	25	6
97	2015	RSM	19–7	Harlington Sports Ground, London	40	25	6
98	2016	CSM	14–5	Penryn, Cornwall	40	26	6
99	2017	RSM	36–19	Harlington Sports Ground, London	41	26	6
100	2018	CSM	35–5	Penryn, Cornwall	41	27	6
101	2019	RSM	15–5	Harlington Sports Ground, London	42	27	6
102	2020	CSM	10–7	Penryn, Cornwall	42	28	6
103	2021	CSM	57–7	Harlington Sports Ground, London	42	29	6
104	2022	CSM	17–10	Penryn, Cornwall	42	30	6
105	2023	Draw	17–17	Harlington Sports Ground, London	42	30	7
106	2024	RSM	12–3	Penryn, Cornwall	43	30	7
107	2025	RSM	56–7	Harlington Sports Ground, London	44	30	7
108	2026	RSM	14–3	Penryn, Cornwall	45	30	7

The original 1985 match at Harlington Sports Ground was cancelled due to a frozen ground, with match being rescheduled at the County Ground Stadium in Exeter later in the year.*

=== Rugby Results Tally Summary ===
Total Completed Matches	RSM Victories	CSM Victories	Draws
108	45	30	7

Note on Record Accuracy: This tally reflects the 108 matches played since the inaugural game in 1902, excluding the seven-year suspensions during both World War I (1914–1920) and World War II (1939–1945). While the total match count is chronologically accurate, 26 results remain missing or unverified from the early 20th century and the mid-1950s through the late 1970s.

== Multi-Sport Weekend (Non-Rugby Results) ==
The following table tracks the winners for each subsidiary sport. The overall winner is awarded the Wardell Armstrong Trophy (introduced in 2020) based on the total points across all events.

Year	Venue	Football	Hockey (M)	Hockey (W)	Netball	Squash	Lacrosse	Badminton	Tennis	Rugby (W)	Overall
2002	Cornwall	5–2 CSM	– CSM	– CSM	—	– CSM	—	—	—	—	CSM
2003	London	1–0 RSM	2–3 CSM	Draw	—	3–2 RSM	—	—	—	—	RSM
2004	Cornwall	Draw	6–2 CSM	8–0 CSM	—	4–1 CSM	—	—	—	—	CSM
2005	London	5–2 RSM	1–3 CSM	1–4 CSM	—	3–2 RSM	—	—	—	—	RSM
2006	Cornwall	– CSM	2–1 CSM	3–0 CSM	—	5–0 CSM	—	—	—	—	CSM
2007	London	1–6 CSM	1–5 CSM	1–5 CSM	5–0 RSM	1–5 CSM	—	—	—	5–15 CSM	CSM
2008	Cornwall	6–0 CSM	3–4 RSM	3–2 CSM	– CSM	5–0 CSM	—	—	—	—	CSM
2009	London	0–4 CSM	0–5 CSM	0–5 CSM	– CSM	0–5 CSM	—	—	—	—	CSM
2010	Cornwall	7–0 CSM	5–1 CSM	3–0 CSM	Draw	4–1 CSM	15–4 RSM	—	—	—	CSM
2011	London	2–3 CSM	1–4 CSM	5–3 RSM	34–15 RSM	3–2 RSM	—	—	—	—	RSM
2012	Cornwall	Draw	3–1 CSM	2–1 CSM	39–27 CSM	0–5 RSM	2–2 CSM	—	—	—	CSM
2013	London	0–4 CSM	0–1 CSM	Draw	27–25 RSM	5–0 RSM	3–1 RSM	—	—	—	RSM
2014	Cornwall	CSM	RSM	RSM	CSM	RSM	—	—	—	—	RSM
2015	London	CSM	RSM	CSM	CSM	RSM	—	6–12 CSM	—	—	RSM
2016	Cornwall	3–0 CSM	Draw	12–0 CSM	—	5–0 CSM	—	—	—	—	CSM
2017	London	Draw	3–1 RSM	0–6 CSM	11–50 CSM	0–4 CSM	10–3 RSM	9–0 RSM	0–4 CSM	10–3 RSM	RSM
2018	Cornwall	CSM	Draw	CSM	CSM	CSM	—	—	—	—	CSM
2019	London	1–0 RSM	1–4 CSM	2–7 CSM	2–88 CSM	2–3 CSM	12–6 RSM	2–8 CSM	1–7 CSM	—	CSM
2020	Cornwall	CSM	RSM	CSM	CSM	CSM	CSM	—	CSM	—	CSM
2022	Cornwall	CSM	RSM	CSM	CSM	CSM	—	CSM	CSM	—	CSM
2023	London	CSM	CSM	RSM	CSM	—	CSM	—	—	—	CSM
2024	Cornwall	CSM	RSM	CSM	CSM	—	CSM	CSM	CSM	CSM	CSM
2025	London	CSM	RSM	CSM	CSM	RSM	RSM	RSM	CSM	Draw	RSM

Note: In 2025, RSM won the Wardell Armstrong Trophy for the first time since its inauguration in 2020, winning 5 of the 9 scoring events (Men's Rugby, Men's Hockey, Squash, Lacrosse, and Badminton).

== Notable Rugby participants ==
Many of those who have played in the Bottle Match have gone on to win international honours; a number of others played in the match after earning international caps. These include:

=== Camborne School of Mines ===
- (England) F. S. Jackson, a forward educated at CSM who played for Cornwall and was considered the "star forward" of the 1908 British Lions tour to New Zealand and Australia.
- Philip John Collins, earned 3 caps for the England national team in 1952 and is recognized as one of the oldest living England internationals.
- Robert Day Kennedy, captain of the CSM XV who earned 3 caps for the England national team in 1949, scoring a try against Scotland.
- J.G. "Jumbo" Milton, earned 5 caps for the England national team (1904–1907) and represented the national side while still a student at CSM.
- Cecil Milton, brother of Jumbo, earned an England cap in 1906.
- Arthur James Wilson, earned an England cap in 1909 and won an Olympic Silver medal in 1908 representing Great Britain.
- Gerald Gordon-Smith, earning 3 England caps in 1900, he attended Camborne School of Mines after his brief international career.
- Keith Bearne, earned 2 caps for Scotland in 1960.

=== Royal School of Mines ===
- John Anthony Sydney Ritson, Professor of Mining at RSM (1936–1952) who earned 8 caps for England and toured with the British & Irish Lions in 1908.

== See also ==
- Cornwall RFU – the governing body for rugby in Cornwall, which often hosts the Bottle Match
- Imperial College London – the parent institution of the Royal School of Mines
- List of British and Irish varsity matches
- The Varsity Match – the annual rugby match between Oxford and Cambridge
- University of Exeter – the parent institution of the Camborne School of Mines
