= 2011–12 Cornwall Hockey Association Plate =

2011–12 CHA Plate
Tournament details
- Teams: 18

Final positions
- Champions: Penzance 1st XI (Men's), Penzance 2nd XI(Ladies)
- Runners-up: Bude 1st XI (Men's), Caradon 2nd XI (Ladies)

The 2011–12 Cornwall Hockey Association Plate was 2011–12 season of the Cornwall Hockey Association Plate known as the Cornwall Plate or CHA Plate. The Plate is the secondary knock-out competition organised by the Cornwall Hockey Association and was contested by senior male and female hockey teams in the county of Cornwall who had been eliminated from the 2011–12 Cornwall Hockey Association Cup in (or prior to) Round 1.

Eighteen teams had competed in the competition (a reduction of one compared to the 2010–11 competition) and began Sunday 18 December 2011 with the Ladies' Plate Round 1. The competition culminated with the Ladies' Plate Final on Sunday 15 April 2012 at Penzance HC. St. Austell HC (1st XI) and Truro HC (1st XI) are the respective holders of the Men's and Ladies' Plates.

== Format ==
The Men's Plate and Ladies' Plate were contested as knockout competitions, with a single defeat eliminating the losing team.

For 2011–12, the draws for all rounds of the competitions were made prior to the start of the tournament, thereby allowing teams to analyse their potential opponents in any subsequent rounds. This system was previously used in the 2009–10 season, but dropped for the 2010–11 competition in favour of a system for drawing each round following the completion of the previous one. As the trial proved unsuccessful, the system reverted for 2011–12.

== Teams and calendar ==
=== Men's Plate ===
Based upon the results of the six matches contested in Round 1 of the 2011–12 CHA Cup the following six teams qualified for the Plate competition:

Team	Cup Result
Bodmin A	Duchy A 5 – 0 Bodmin A
Bude A	Camborne SoM A 5 – 3 Bude A
Bude	Camborne SoM 5 – 2 Bude
Penzance A	Penzance A 0-5 Truro B (walkover)
Penzance	Penzance 1 – 4 Truro A
Truro C	Bodmin 5 – 0 Truro C (walkover)

The draw for the competition will be based upon the draw for the 2011–12 CHA Cup.

Round	Main Date	Teams Involved	Winners from previous round	New entries
Round 1	29 Jan 12	4	0	4
Semi-final	18 Mar 12	4	2	2
Final	15 Apr 12	2	2	0

=== Ladies' Plate ===
Based upon the results of the three Preliminary round matches, and eight matches contested in Round 1 of the 2011–12 CHA Cup the following eleven teams qualified for the Plate competition:

Team	Cup Result
Truro II	Preliminary round: Truro II 0-5 Duchy (walkover)
Falmouth III	Preliminary round: Falmouth III 1-5 Caradon III
Launceston	Preliminary round: Launceston 0-5 Callington (walkover)
Duchy	Round 1: Duchy 0-11 Falmouth
Caradon II	Round 1: Truro 8-1 Caradon II
Penzance II	Round 1: Bude II 4-2 Penzance II
Bodmin	Round 1: Penzance 5-0 Bodmin (walkover)
Callington	Round 1: Callington 0-13 Camborne SoM
Caradon III	Round 1: Newquay 5-0 Caradon III (walkover)
St. Austell	Round 1: Bude 8-0 St. Austell
Falmouth II	Round 1: Caradon 10-1 Falmouth II

Of the eleven competing teams, the highest ranked four teams, plus one further team drawn at random will be given a bye to the quarter finals, with the remaining six teams drawn randomly into Round 1.

Round	Main Date	Teams Involved	Winners from previous round	New entries
Round 1	18 Dec 11	6	0	6
Quarter-final	29 Jan 12	8	3	5
Semi-final	18 Mar 12	4	4	0
Final	15 Apr 12	2	2	0

== Results and fixtures ==
The draw for the Men's Plate and Ladies' Plate was carried out on 1 December 2011.

=== Men's Plate ===
==== Quarter-finals ====
No.	Fixture	Result
1	Bude A v Bude	0–12
2	Penzance A v Penzance	Away Win

==== Semi-finals ====
No.	Match	Result
1	Bude v Bodmin A	Home Win
2	Penzance v Truro C	Home Win

==== Final ====
No.	Match	Result
1	Bude 3-4 Penzance	

=== Ladies' Plate ===
Round 1
6	Falmouth II
Bye
18	Callington
16	Truro II	w.o.
13	Penzance II
Bye
15	Launceston	w.o.
17	Falmouth III
9	Bodmin
Bye
19	Duchy	w.o.
14	Caradon III
12	Caradon II
Bye
11	St. Austell
Bye

Quarter-finals
6	Falmouth II	6
16	Truro II	0
13	Penzance II	14
15	Launceston	0
9	Bodmin	5
19	Duchy	0
12	Caradon II	w.o.
11	St. Austell

Semi-finals
6	Falmouth II	3
13	Penzance II (a.e.t)	4
9	Bodmin	5
12	Caradon II	7

Final
13	Penzance II	3p
12	Caradon II	3
