= King Edward Mine =

Former mine in Camborne, Cornwall

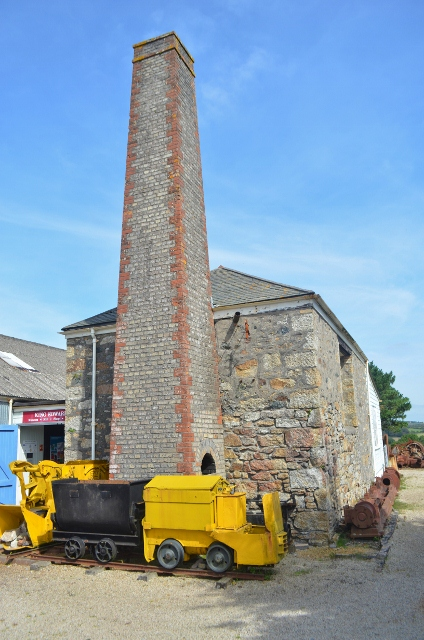
- Location: United Kingdom
- Coordinates: 50°12′14″N 5°16′16″W
- Website: www.kingedwardmine.co.uk
- Location of King Edward Mine

The King Edward Mine at Camborne, Cornwall, in the United Kingdom is a mine owned by Cornwall Council.

At the end of the 19th century, students at the Camborne School of Mines spent much of their time doing practical mining and tin dressing work in the local tin mines. The industry was almost in terminal decline and the surviving mines were falling behind technically. This was hardly ideal from the instruction point of view. The only real solution was for Camborne School of Mines to have its own underground mine.

== South Condurrow Mine ==
In 1897, Camborne School of Mines took over the abandoned eastern part of the South Condurrow Mine around the engine shaft of the same name. This offered the opportunity to work both William's Lode and the Great Flat Lode down to 400 feet from surface. No pumping was necessary as all water in the mine drained into the then-working Grenville mine to the south. Between 1897 and 1906 the mine was almost totally re-equipped, based on what was then the best of Cornish mining and milling practice. Engine Shaft and William's Shafts were re-equipped, the underground workings cleared, and a number of surface buildings erected, including a complete modern full-scale tin dressing plant, survey office, workshops, and lecture rooms. The original Count House (i.e. offices) and changehouse facilities were retained. The mine was operated semi-commercially and produced tin on a regular basis, employing some 10–20 men in addition to the college teaching staff. Much of the production work was carried out by students. In 1901, it was renamed King Edward Mine.

Cornish mines, due to conservatism and a lack of cash, were slow to adopt the mechanised dressing equipment and methods that were developed at the end of the 19th century. Most dressing plants of that period merely allowed the pulp coming from the Cornish stamps to settle in long launders from where it was dug out for final treatment in buddles and kieves – a labour-intensive and inefficient process. Dolcoath Mine was probably the most progressive mine in the county; the first Californian stamps were erected there around 1892, followed by the first vanners and shaking tables about 1898. The mill at King Edward Mine was one of the first Cornish dressing plants to be designed from new to use this new equipment.

== Great Condurrow Mine ==
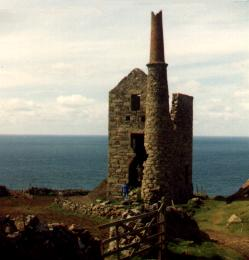
Engine House

Great Condurrow (also known as Pendarves United) stopped working in July 1881. The post-war slump in 1921 saw the closure of Wheal Grenville which resulted in the flooding of King Edward Mine. Mining operations were transferred, albeit on a far smaller scale, to the adjacent Great Condurrow Mine, to the north, a small portion of which was above the natural drainage level.

Over the years, as mining education became more technical, the tin dressing machinery was replaced with pilot scale equipment. In 1974, the pilot plant was transferred to the new School of Mines Trevenson Campus at Pool and the 'mill complex' part of the site, which included the mill, stamps, mill engine house, boiler house and the calciner, had been largely stripped of their equipment and were no longer required for educational purposes.

== Museum ==
In 1987, a group was formed with a view to turning the mill complex into a museum. The objectives of the group can be summarised as follows:

1. To preserve the buildings and the site, which is of significant historical importance.
2. To re-equip the mill to working condition using, where possible, rescued and preserved equipment, which itself is of historical interest.
3. To establish a small museum telling the story of King Edward Mine, the local "Flat Lode" mining area, tin dressing, etc.
4. To rescue and to preserve industrial plant and equipment relevant to Cornish industry.

Holmans Rock Drill from 1955 (from vol. 55 of CSM Magazine)

Supported by the School of Mines, a team of volunteers, mainly drawn from the Carn Brea Mining Society, have spent in excess of 10,000 hours on the project. Much material and equipment has been loaned or donated, and the mill has been largely returned to a working condition, substantially as it would have been in the early years of the 20th century. King Edward Mine is the oldest complete mining site left in Cornwall. Whilst designed for education purposes, it demonstrates, on a small scale, all that would have been found on the best Cornish mine at the turn of the century. This has been recognised by English Heritage, who have listed the whole site Grade II*.

== Trevithick Trust ==
In mid-2000 the Trevithick Trust leased the "museum/mill" part of the site from the Camborne School of Mines. After major building repairs, funded by a European grant as part of the Mineral Tramways Project, the site was officially opened to the public on 28 April 2002. The Trevithick Trust ceased to exist in 2006 and by 2014 the site was again in a poor state.

== Cornwall Council ownership ==
The site was taken over by Cornwall Council and a £1.1 million grant from the National Lottery meant much needed work could be done, with provision of a café and some existing buildings being converted into revenue-producing workspaces. The site was reopened in April 2017, with further renovation and maintenance being done. Today, the visitor can see the newly re-collared Engine shaft and a small museum in what was the mill engine room, which tells the story of the site, mining techniques and tin dressing, as well as providing an introduction to the human side of the site. The mine was intensively photographed by Cornish photographer J.C. Burrow throughout its construction and development period and is certainly the most photographed mine of its size in Cornwall. Many of these photographs are used in the museum displays. A guided tour of the mill is also available. Here can be seen the Californian stamps (erected in 1901), which are the only full-size set in existence in the UK and probably in Europe. They are complete and in original condition. Much of the machinery in the mill is demonstrated working.

As of 2023, the site is owned by Cornwall Council. Some of the workspaces are used by the Royal Geological Society of Cornwall which had sold its former base, the South Wing of St John's Hall in Penzance, to the council for £1 with an understanding the council would provide a new base, and the Upstream Thinking project of Cornwall Wildlife Trust.

== Buildings ==
Elsewhere on the site, but not currently open to the public, are:

- The mine office – the only 'Count House' in Cornwall still used for the purpose for which it was built in the 1860s.
- The timber-framed and panelled Survey Office – a classic structure of which no other examples remain in Cornwall.
- The carpenters' shop, blacksmith's shop, vanning room and the original miners 'dry'.
- The cobbled 'spalling' floor, which probably dates from about 1865 when the mine was predominantly a copper producer, which is one of the better examples remaining in Cornwall.

== Open days ==
Up to 2020 the mine held an annual open day as a celebration of mining in Cornwall, the day after Camborne's Trevithick day. In 2009 it was held on 26 April and featured local brass bands and dancers as well as demonstrations of vanning, vintage tractors, cars and stationary engines, a model railway exhibition and mine models.

== International Mining Games ==
King Edward Mine is the venue for the International Mining Games when it is held in the UK and is where CSM student teams train before competitions overseas.
