= Vanning (disambiguation) =

Vanning may refer to:

- Vanning - a type of ore dressing by which ores are washed on a shovel.
- Vanning (hobby) - a hobby practiced by aficionados of tricked-out conversion vans.
- Vanning (music) - to indulge in the lyrical mastery of Van Morrison.
