= Confederation of UK Coal Producers =

UK trade association

Confederation of United Kingdom Coal Producers
- Abbreviation: CoalPro
- Formation: 1991
- Legal status: Non-profit company
- Purpose: Coal mining businesses in the United Kingdom
- Location: Confederation House, Thornes Office Park, Denby Dale Road, Wakefield, West Yorkshire, WF2 7AN
- Region served: UK
- Members: 7 coal producing companies, and 9 other companies
- Notable chairs: Richard Budge
- Affiliations: European Association for Coal and Lignite (Euracoal)
- Website: CoalPro

The Confederation of UK Coal Producers (or CoalPro) was the UK trade association for coal mining companies. Full members included Banks Developments, Celtic Energy, Kier Mining, Miller Argent, Hall Construction, Hargreaves Services, and Land Engineering Services. It represented 90% of the fragmented UK coal industry after the National Coal Board was dissolved in 1987.

== Status in the 2020s ==
The UK coal industry now employs less than 1,000 people directly. The Confederation of UK Coal Producers was dissolved in February 2017 according to Companies House.

== See also ==
- British Coal Utilisation Research Association
- Coal Authority
- Institute of Materials, Minerals and Mining
- National Coal Mining Museum for England
- Mining Association of the United Kingdom
