= Mining Association of the United Kingdom =

- Formation: 1946
- Legal status: Non-profit company
- Purpose: Mining businesses in the United Kingdom
- Location: Expert House, Sandford Street, Lichfield, Staffordshire, WS13 6QA
- Region served: UK
- Members: 15 mining companies
- Affiliations: Euromines
- Website: MA UK

The Mining Association of the United Kingdom is a trade association for all kinds of mining undertaken by UK companies.

== Function ==
It promotes and fosters the interests of the metals and mining industry in any part of the world and the corporations, companies, firms and persons engaged or interested in the industry or in industries ancillary to or allied with the metals and minerals industry.

Its members include all the major industrial mineral mining operators in the United Kingdom. Its work is concentrated on representing its member's interest at Government and European level on environmental and health & safety issues. It is actively involved in lobbying and consulting on proposed legislation.

It is an active member of Euromines (the European Mining Federation) and values the access and links to European Commission legislative procedures, which this brings. The majority of new legislation which has impact on the mining sector originates in Brussels. Therefore, the Association is committed to participating in Europe.

It represents the commercial interest of the UK's mining industry outside of coal mining, and includes industries mining:

- Potash (potassium carbonate)
- Salt
- Sylvinite - a mixture of sylvite (potassium chloride) and halite (commonly known as rock salt - sodium chloride)
- Gypsum (calcium sulphate) - used for plaster
- Fluorspar - also known as fluorite (calcium fluoride)
- Barytes (barium sulphate)

== History ==
=== Formation ===
It was founded in August 1946 under the name of British Overseas Mining Association. The founding members were:

- New Consolidated Gold Fields Ltd
- Johannesburg Consolidated Investment Co Ltd
- Mining Trust Ltd
- Rio Tinto
- Union Corporation Ltd
- General Mining and Finance Corporation Ltd
- Mason and Berry Ltd

The issues which the Association dealt with on behalf of this original group were mainly taxation issues.

=== Name change ===
In 1966 this name was changed to Overseas Mining Association and in 1976 the name was changed to its present style when it merged with the United Kingdom Metal Mining Association.

== Structure ==
It is based in Lichfield in Staffordshire.

=== Current members ===
- Anglesey Mining
  Anglo American
  Cleveland Potash
  BPB
  Camborne School of Mines, University of Exeter
  Glebe Mines
  IMC Group
  Inco Europe
  IOM3
  Irish Salt Mining & Exploration Co
  National Coal Mining Museum for England
  Nirex
  Rio Tinto
  Salt Union Limited
  Wardell Armstrong
