= The Miners Association =

Body representing hard rock mining, est. 1858

The Miners Association was founded in 1858 by Robert Hunt FRS, and the Royal Cornwall Polytechnic Society. The Association was formed to create a body that would discuss, develop, address the needs and represent the hard rock mining industry within the south west region of the United Kingdom.

== History ==
Within the first year of existence The Association took the name Miners Association of Cornwall & Devon to also represent the interests of the mining community of the counties of Devon, which had strong links within Cornwall.

Later the Miners Association changed its name to the Mining Institute. The date of this name change is not known, although it was before 1887.

== Achievements of the Association ==
- Within the first year of the Association's existence it set about trying to address the need for improved skills and education within the mining community. The Association's answer was the creation of classes in different mining areas of Cornwall.
- In 1876, after extensive discussions by the Association, George Basset made a bequest to enable the building of a laboratory in Camborne. This laboratory was to be used to improve the teaching of the Miners Association's pupils.
- The establishment of the Redruth Mining School in 1882.
- In 1887 J. J. Beringer delivered a lecture to the Miners Association, now called the Mining Institute, in which he outlined new proposals for the establishment of a Mining School.
- In 1888 The Association founded The Camborne Mining School, which still exists as the Camborne School of Mines
- The Penzance Mining School was established in 1890, following Sir Humphry Davy's contribution to the mining industry.
- Robert Hunt Memorial Museum erected to the memory of Robert Hunt in Redruth.

== Notable members of the Association ==
- Dr Clement Le Neve Foster Assistant Secretary
- Joseph Henry Collins Lecturer and Assistant Secretary 1868
- Robert Hunt FRS
