= Sam-E =

Sam-E may refer to:

- Sam-e, an alternative name of the drug S-Adenosyl methionine
- Sam-E (singer), Swedish singer of Tunisian descent, part of the Swedish duo Medina

== See also ==
- Sam E. Jonah (born 1949), Ghanaian businessman
