= 2012–13 CHA Cup =

Tournament details
- Teams: 35 (15 male, 20 female)

Final positions
- Champions: TBC
- Runners-up: TBC

The 2012–13 Cornwall Hockey Association Cup will be the 2012–13 season of the Cornwall Hockey Association Knockout Cup, known as the Cornwall Cup or CHA Cup. The CHA Cup is the flagship competition organised by the Cornwall Hockey Association, contested by senior male and female hockey teams in the county of Cornwall.

Entries for the competition were confirmed in August 2012, with 35 (of a possible 36) teams representing all 12 clubs eligible to compete in the competition. The competition will begin in September 2012 with the Ladies Cup, Preliminary round and culminate with the Ladies Cup final in April 2013 at Penzance HC. Truro HC and Newquay HC are the respective defending champions of the Men's and Ladies Cups.

== Format ==
Both the Men's Cup and Ladies Cup are to be contested as knockout competitions, with a single defeat eliminating the losing team. A team which is defeated in, or prior to, Round 1 of the Cup competition will qualify for the 2012–13 Cornwall Hockey Association Plate.

2012–13 will see the draws for all rounds of the competitions made prior to the start of the tournament, thereby allowing teams to analyse their potential opponents in any subsequent rounds.

== Teams and calendar ==
=== Men's Cup ===
15 (out of a possible 16) teams representing all seven eligible clubs entered the competition.

Club	Teams eligible	Teams entered	Notes
Bodmin	2	2	
Bude	2	2	
Camborne SoM	2	2	
Caradon	1	1	
Duchy	2	2	
Penzance	3	2	Penzance elected not to enter their 3rd XI
Truro	4	4	
Total	16	15	

Round	Main date	Teams involved	Winners from previous round	New entries
Round 1	TBC	14	-	14
Quarter-final	TBC	8	7	1
Semi-final	TBC	4	4	0
Final	TBC	2	2	0

Of the fifteen competing teams, fourteen were entered into Round 1 of the competition, with the seven winners joining defending champions, a first ranked team, Truro in the quarter-finals.

=== Ladies Cup ===
All 20 teams, representing all twelve eligible clubs entered the Ladies Cup.

Club	Teams Eligible	Teams Entered	Notes
Bodmin	1	1	
Bude	2	2	
Callington	1	1	
Camborne SoM	1	1	
Caradon	3	3	
Duchy	1	1	
Falmouth	3	3	
Launceston	1	1	
Newquay	2	2	
Penzance	2	2	
St. Austell	1	1	
Truro	2	1	
Total	20	20	

Of the twenty competing teams, eight were entered into a Preliminary round with the four winners joining the remaining twelve teams in Round 1. The eight teams contesting the preliminary round were those teams ranked lowest based upon their finishing position in the 2011-12 league season.

Round	Main Date	Teams Involved	Winners from previous round	New entries
Preliminary round	25 Sep 11	6	0	6
Round 1	30 Oct 11	16	3	13
Quarter-final	29 Jan 12	8	8	0
Semi-final	18 Mar 12	4	4	0
Final	15 Apr 12	2	2	0

== Results and Fixtures ==
The draw for both the Men's Cup and Ladies' Cup was carried out on 25 July 2012.

=== Men's Cup ===
Round 1
14	Truro C	1
6	Penzance	9
4	Truro A	w/o
11	Penzance A
5	Bude
12	Camborne SoM A
2	Bodmin	9
13	Bude A	1
1	Truro
-	-bye-
9	Truro B	3
7	Duchy	4
8	Caradon	11
10	Bodmin A	1
15	Duchy A	3
3	Camborne SoM	5

Quarter-finals
6	Penzance
4	Truro A
2	Bodmin
1	Truro
7	Duchy
8	Caradon
3	Camborne SoM

Semi-finals

Final

=== Ladies Cup ===
==== Preliminary round ====
The eight lowest ranked teams in the competition (based upon their finishing position in the 2011-12 league season) will contest the preliminary round. The draw was carried out at random. Rankings are shown in parentheses.

Match	Home team	Away team	Result
A	Caradon III [16]	Callington [19]	1–3
B	Truro II [15]	Caradon II [14]	w/o to Truro II
C	Falmouth III [18]	Bodmin [13]	4–10
D	Launceston [17]	Newquay II [20]	0–1

==== Main Draw ====
Round 1
3	Bude	12
19	Callington	0
11	Duchy	1
1	Newquay	6
8	Camborne SoM	w/o
10	St. Austell
6	Truro	14
14	Truro II	1
7	Bude II	5
13	Bodmin	0
9	Falmouth II	0
9	Falmouth	10
12	Penzance II	6
4	Caradon	7
5	Penzance	16
20	Newquay II	2

Quarter-finals
3	Bude
1	Newquay
8	Camborne SoM
6	Truro
7	Bude II
2	Falmouth
4	Caradon
5	Penzance

Semi-finals

Final
