= Robert Kennedy (rugby union) =

England international rugby union player (1925–1979)

- Full name: Robert Day Kennedy
- Born: 14 August 1925 Bulawayo, Rhodesia
- Died: 8 May 1979 (aged 53) Bulawayo, Rhodesia

Rugby union career
- Position: Wing
International career
Years	Team	Apps	(Points)
1949	England	3	(3)

Robert Day Kennedy (14 August 1925 – 8 May 1979) was a Rhodesian rugby union player.

Born in Bulawayo, Kennedy came to England to study at Camborne School of Mines. He captained the school's rugby XV and also turned out for Camborne RFC, while representing Cornwall in county fixtures. In 1949, Kennedy was capped three times for England as a winger in the Five Nations, scoring a try in their win over Scotland.

Kennedy became a prominent mining consultant in Rhodesia. He died in a Bulawayo hospital in 1979 of wounds received in an ambush by nationalist guerrillas two weeks prior, an attack that took place under the backdrop of the Bush War.

== See also ==
- List of England national rugby union players
