= Vanning =

Ore dressing in which ores are washed on a shovel

Vanning is a type of ore dressing by which ores are washed on a shovel. Typically, a powdered sample of orestuff is swirled with water on the blade of a shovel and then given a series of upward flicking motions. The heavier ore is tossed up through the water and appears as a crescent shaped patch at the top of the charge with the lighter gangue below. Developed in western England, this process was still in use at a major tin mine and a mine waste collection firm in Cornwall until 1985.

== Frue vanner ==
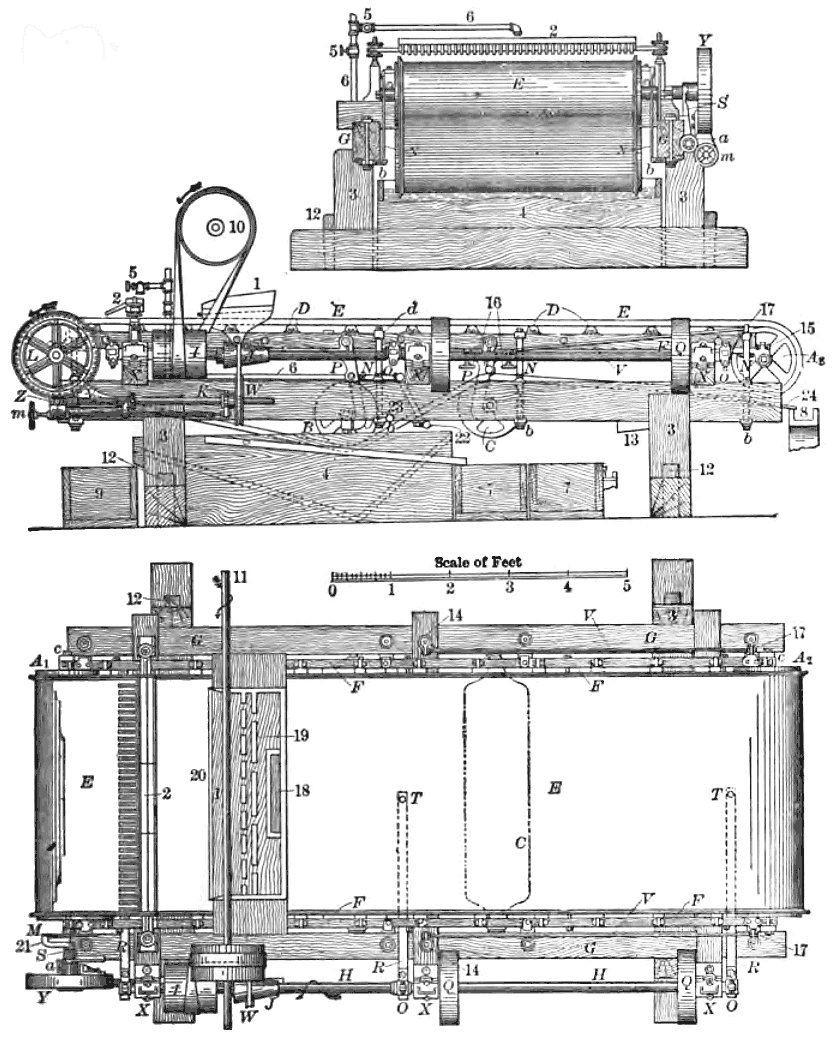
End, side and overhead views of a Frue vanner

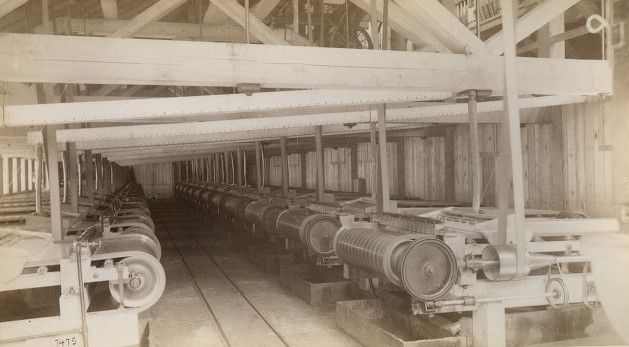
Vanner room, Treadwell gold mine, 1887. These vanners served a 120 stamp mill battery. Note railroad tracks in aisle.

In the 19th century the process was automated and used for the separation of ore on an industrial scale. The Frue vanner was one such machine that was widely adopted. It was invented in 1874, by W. B. Frue, Superintendent of the Silver Islet Mine, Ontario, Canada, who spent two years developing the system.

In the Frue vanner a continuous rubber belt 4 feet wide and 27½ feet long passed over rollers to form the surface of an inclined plane on which the orestuff was concentrated. The belt travelled up hill at from 3 to 12 feet per minute while being laterally shaken about 180 to 200 times. The inclination of the belt was from 4 to 12 in. per 12 feet. The belt received crushed orestuff from the stamps via a distributor about 4 feet from its upper end. As it travelled upwards, it met with small jets of water which gradually washed the gangue off the bottom of the belt. As the belt travelled over the top roller with the heavier ore adhering to it, it passed into a box containing water where the ore was deposited. From 3 to 6 gallons per minute of water was required. One machine could treat 6 tons per 24 hours of stuff passing a 40 mesh screen, or 2 vanners to 5 stamps. The Embrey Concentrator and the Triumph Concentrator were similar to the Frue vanner except that the shaking was longitudinal instead of lateral.

King Edward Mine in Cornwall claims to have the only working Frue vanner in the world, restored in 2008.
