= Engine shaft =

Mine shaft used for the purpose of pumping

For mine construction, an engine shaft is a mine shaft used for the purpose of pumping, irrespective of the prime mover.

== See also ==
- Outline of mining
- Shaft sinking
