= Euromines =

European association for mining organisations

- European Association of Mining Industries, Metal Ores & Industrial Minerals
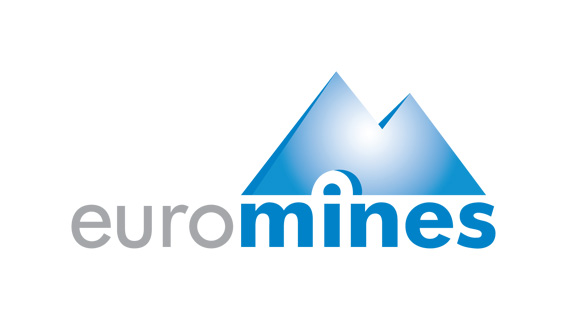
- Founded: 1996
- Type: Industry association
- Headquarters: Brussels, Belgium
- President: Mikael Staffas
- Director General: Rolf Kuby
- Website: euromines.org

Euromines, the European Association of Mining Industries, Metal Ores & Industrial Minerals, is a European industry association representing companies and national federations in the metals and industrial minerals mining sectors. Founded in 1996, the association is based in Brussels, Belgium, and represents the interests of the mining industry in discussions concerning European Union policy and legislation.

The association provides a platform for cooperation among its members, including the exchange of information and the development of common positions on policies affecting mineral extraction and related industries. Its work covers areas such as raw materials, environmental regulation, occupational health and safety, energy, climate policy and sustainable development.

Its membership includes both large and small companies, as well as their subsidiaries in Europe and other parts of the world, collectively employing more than 350,000 people. These members produce over 54 different metals and minerals. For certain metals and minerals, Europe is among the world’s leading producers.

== History ==
Euromines was established in 1996 to represent mining industry organisations at the European level. Its initial membership included several national mining associations, primarily from Western Europe.

The association subsequently developed its role as a representative organisation for the European metals and minerals mining sector, engaging with European institutions on policy and legislative issues affecting mining and mineral supply. Its activities have included facilitating dialogue between industry representatives and public authorities and coordinating positions on issues of common interest to its members.

== Organisation and Membership ==
Euromines brings together companies involved in mining metal ores and industrial minerals, national mining federations and associated members. Its membership includes organisations of different sizes and companies with operations in Europe and other parts of the world.

The association operates through an Executive Committee, a secretariat and a network of committees and task forces. These structures support its governance, coordinate member activities and contribute to the development of common positions on industry-related issues.

Euromines is headquartered in Brussels, where its location facilitates engagement with European Union institutions and other organisations involved in European industrial and raw materials policy.

== EU Policy ==
=== European policy and regulation ===
Euromines represents its members in discussions concerning European and international policies and legislation affecting the mining industry. Its activities include assessing regulatory developments, coordinating industry positions and facilitating communication between member organisations and public authorities.

The association participates in policy discussions concerning the availability of mineral resources, the competitiveness of European industry and the regulatory conditions affecting mineral extraction and processing.

=== Raw Materials ===
Raw materials policy is one of Euromines' principal areas of activity. The association engages in discussions concerning mineral supply, access to mineral resources and the role of mining in European industrial value chains. Its work addresses the policy conditions affecting the extraction and supply of metals and industrial minerals.

=== Environment, Health and Safety ===
Euromines addresses environmental protection, occupational health and safety, and the management of environmental and social impacts associated with mining activities. Its work in these areas concerns the regulatory frameworks applicable to mineral extraction, environmental management, mine rehabilitation and the protection of workers.

The association engages with European policymakers on legislation and standards affecting environmental performance and workplace safety in the mining sector. It also promotes the exchange of information and industry practices relating to responsible mining, risk management and sustainable development.

=== Energy and Climate ===
Euromines engages in European energy and climate policy discussions concerning the competitiveness and decarbonisation of the mining industry. Its work addresses the implications of energy costs, climate legislation, carbon pricing and emissions-reduction requirements for mineral extraction and processing.

The association represents its members in discussions on policies affecting the energy-intensive mining and minerals sectors, including measures intended to reduce greenhouse gas emissions while maintaining the competitiveness of European industry. These issues are particularly relevant to the production of metals and industrial minerals, which can require substantial amounts of energy.

=== Sustainability ===
The Sustainability Committee is part of Euromines' committee structure and addresses sustainability-related policy issues affecting the European mining industry. It coordinates member expertise on environmental, social and governance (ESG) policies and engages with European Union institutions on legislation and regulatory initiatives relevant to the sector.

The committee's activities include monitoring developments in sustainability reporting, sustainable finance and standards for raw materials. It also provides a forum for members to exchange knowledge and practices relating to sustainability in mining and to develop common positions on relevant policy proposals.

The committee's work includes issues such as the European Union's sustainable finance taxonomy, sustainability reporting standards and the development of standards for sustainable raw materials. Through these activities, it represents members' interests in policy discussions concerning the sustainability requirements applicable to the mining industry.

=== Magnesite and Magnesia Assembly ===
The Magnesite and Magnesia Assembly is one of the specialised groups within Euromines. It brings together industry representatives to address policy and regulatory issues affecting the European magnesite and magnesia sector.

== Sustainable Mining Initiative (SMI) ==
The Sustainable Mining Initiative (SMI) is an initiative established by Euromines to showcase sustainability practices and operational examples from companies in the European mining industry.

The initiative focuses on four areas: circular economy, nature restoration, decarbonisation and community engagement. It provides a platform for participating companies to share case studies and examples of practices relating to resource efficiency, ecosystem restoration, emissions reduction and relationships with communities in areas where mining operations take place.

The initiative also supports communication and knowledge exchange concerning sustainability in the mining sector.

== Euromines ==
- Euromines Website
- Direct Companies
- National Federations
- Associated Members
- Sustainable Mining Initiative (SMI)

== Euromines Publications ==
- Resource Hub
