= Cornwall Hockey Association Knockout Cup =

The Cornwall Hockey Association Cup, commonly referred to as the Cornwall County Cup or CHA Cup, is a knockout cup competition in Field Hockey for clubs based in Cornwall, run by and named after the Cornwall Hockey Association. The competitions are open to all senior male and female hockey teams within the county of Cornwall.

As of 2017-18, the competitions included are the Men's Cup and Ladies Cup, the reigning champions of which are Camborne School of Mines HC and Caradon HC respectively.

== Competitions and Format ==
The Men's and Ladies Cups are played concurrently between September and April, culminating with the competition finals which are typically played in early April. The finals of the competitions; as well as the Cornwall Hockey Association Plate; are contested on a single date at a single venue determined by the Cornwall Hockey Association at the start of each season. The Finals of the 2016-17 competitions were held at Penzance HC on 08 April 2017.

=== Men's Cup ===
Since the 2016-17 Season, the Men's Cup comprises a round-robin stage followed by a single elimination knockout format semi-final and final.

The entered teams are divided into four groups of either three or four teams, playing each of the other teams in the group once; with home or away ties determined by the draw. The winner of each group advances to the Semi Finals.

The runner up from each group advance to the Cornwall Hockey Association Plate semi finals. All other teams are eliminated. The 4 top-ranked teams in the county are seeded so as to avoid their being drawn against one another at this stage of the competition. All other teams are drawn randomly

=== Women's Cup ===
Since the inception of the competition, the Women's Cup has followed a single elimination knockout format, consisting of up to five rounds of matches. As of the 2016-17 Season, the four lowest-ranked sides (based upon league position from the previous season) enter the competition in Round 1, with all remaining teams entering in Round 2. The four top-ranked teams in the county are seeded in Round 2 so as to avoid their being drawn against one another. All other teams are drawn randomly.

== Previous Winners ==
Season	Women's Cup Winners	Women's Cup Runner Up	Men's Cup Winners	Men's Cup Runner Up
2016-17	Caradon 1st XI	Bodmin 1st XI	Camborne SoM 1st XI	Bodmin 1st XI
2015-16	Falmouth 1st XI	Newquay 1st XI	Duchy 1st XI	Bodmin 1st XI
2014-15	Falmouth 1st XI	Newquay 1st XI	Duchy 1st XI	Truro 2nd XI
2013-14	Falmouth 1st XI	See Note 1	Truro 2nd XI	Truro 3rd XI
2012-13	Newquay 1st XI	Falmouth 1st XI	Truro 1st XI	Penzance 1st XI
2011-12	Newquay 1st XI	Falmouth 1st XI	Truro 1st XI	Bodmin 1st XI
2010-11	Falmouth 1st XI	Newquay 1st XI	Truro 1st XI	Penzance 1st XI
2009-10	Falmouth 1st XI	Caradon 1st XI	Truro 1st XI	Bodmin 1st XI
2008-09	St. Austell 1st XI	Falmouth 1st XI	Truro 1st XI	Bodmin 1st XI

Note 1: The 2013-14 Women's Cup final between Falmouth HC and Bude HC was not contested as Bude were unable to raise a side. As such, Falmouth were declared champions and no runner-up award was made. As a result, Bude were barred from entering the 2014-15 competition
