= Gyrotheodolite =

Surveying instrument

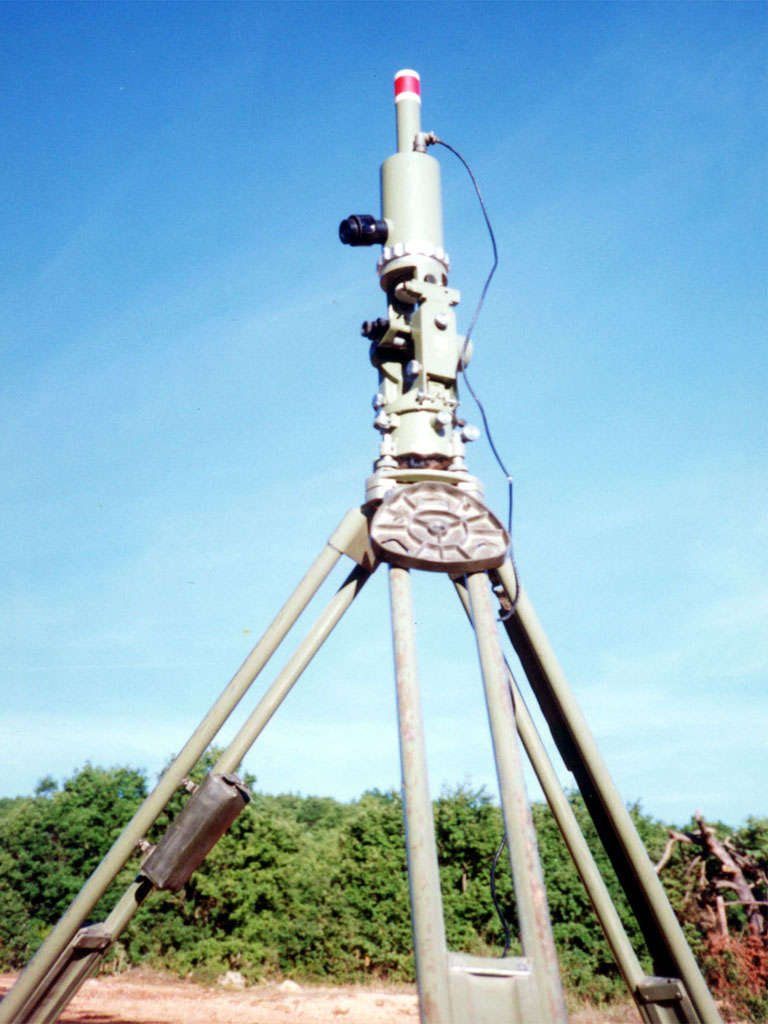
A Wild GAK gyroscope mounted on a Wild T-16 theodolite.

In surveying, a gyrotheodolite (also: surveying gyro) is an instrument composed of a gyrocompass mounted to a theodolite. It is used to determine the orientation of true north. It is the main instrument for orientation in mine surveying and in tunnel engineering, where astronomical star sights are not visible and GPS does not work.

== History ==
In 1852, the French physicist Léon Foucault discovered that a gyro with two degrees of freedom points north. This principle was adapted by Max Schuler in 1921 to build the first surveying gyro. In 1949, the gyro-theodolite – at that time called a "meridian pointer" or "meridian indicator" – was first used by the Clausthal Mining Academy underground. Several years later it was improved with the addition of autocollimation telescopes. In 1960, the Fennel Kassel company produced the first of the KT1 series of gyro-theodolites. Fennel Kassel and others later produced gyro attachments that can be mounted on normal theodolites.

== Operation ==
A gyroscope is mounted in a sphere, lined with Mu-metal to reduce magnetic influence, connected by a spindle to the vertical axis of the theodolite. The battery-powered gyro wheel is rotated at 20,000 rpm or more, until it acts as a north-seeking gyroscope. A separate optical system within the attachment permits the operator to rotate the theodolite and thereby bring a zero mark on the attachment into coincidence with the gyroscope spin axis. By tracking the spin axis as it oscillates about the meridian, a record of the azimuth of a series of the extreme stationary points of that oscillation may be determined by reading the theodolite azimuth circle. A midpoint can later be computed from these records that represents a refined estimate of the meridian. Careful setup and repeated observations can give an estimate that is within about 10 arc seconds of the true meridian. This estimate of the meridian contains errors due to the zero torque of the suspension not being aligned precisely with the true meridian and to measurement errors of the slightly damped extremes of oscillation. These errors can be moderated by refining the initial estimate of the meridian to within a few arc minutes and correctly aligning the zero torque of the suspension.

When the spinner is released from restraint with its axis of rotation aligned close to the meridian, the gyroscopic reaction of spin and Earth's rotation results in precession of the spin axis in the direction of alignment with the plane of the meridian. This is because the daily rotation of the Earth is in effect continuously tilting the east–west axis of the station. The spinner axis then accelerates towards and overshoots the meridian, it then slows to a halt at an extreme point before similarly swinging back towards the initial point of release. This oscillation in azimuth of the spinner axis about the meridian repeats with a period of a few minutes. In practice the amplitude of oscillation will only gradually reduce as energy is lost due to the minimal damping present. Gyro-theodolites employ an undamped oscillating system because a determination can be obtained in less than about 20 minutes, while the asymptotic settling of a damped gyro-compass would take many times that before any reasonable determination of meridian could possibly be made.

When not in operation, the gyroscope assembly is anchored within the instrument. The electrically powered gyroscope is started while restrained and then released for operation. During operation the gyroscope is supported within the instrument assembly, typically on a thin vertical tape that constrains the gyroscope spinner axis to remain horizontal. The alignment of the spin axis is permitted to rotate in azimuth by only the small amount required during operation. An initial approximate estimate of the meridian is needed. This might be determined with a magnetic compass, from an existing survey network or by the use of the gyro-theodolite in an extended tracking mode.

== Uses ==
Gyro-theodolites are primarily used in the absence of astronomical star sights and GPS. For example, where a conduit must pass under a river, a vertical shaft on each side of the river might be connected by a horizontal tunnel. A gyro-theodolite can be operated at the surface and then again at the foot of the shafts to identify the directions needed to tunnel between the base of the two shafts. During the construction of the Channel Tunnel, which runs under the English Channel from France to the UK, gyro-theodolites were used to align the tunnels.

== Limitations ==
Although a gyro-theodolite functions at the equator and in both the northern and southern hemispheres, it cannot be used at either the North Pole or South Pole, where the Earth's axis is precisely perpendicular to the horizontal axis of the spinner and the meridian is undefined. Gyro-theodolites are not normally used within about 15 degrees of the pole where the angle between the earth's rotation and the direction of gravity is too small for it to work reliably.

Unlike an artificial horizon or inertial navigation system, a gyro-theodolite cannot be relocated while it is operating. It must be restarted again at each site.

When available, astronomical star sights are able to give the meridian bearing to better than one hundred times the accuracy of the gyro-theodolite. Where this extra precision is not required, the gyro-theodolite is able to produce a result quickly without the need for night observations.
