= Cornwall Hockey Association Plate =

The Cornwall Hockey Association Plate, commonly referred to as the Cornwall Plate or simply The Plate, is a knockout cup competition in Field Hockey for clubs based in Cornwall. The competition is the second-tier knockout competition run by the Cornwall Hockey Association, and is contested by clubs who are eliminated from the Cornwall Hockey Association Knockout Cup in the early stages of that competition. The competition is contested by both male and female hockey teams within the county of Cornwall.

As of the 2017–18, the competitions included are the Men's Plate and Women's Plate, the reigning champions are Truro 2nd XI and Caradon 2nd XI respectively.

== Competitions and Format ==
=== Men's Plate ===
As of the 2016-17 Season, The Men's Plate is contested by those teams finishing as runners-up in the Group (or round robin) stage of the CHA Cup. The four entered teams contest a single-elimination semi-final and final to determine the competition winner.

=== Women's Plate ===
Since the inception of the competition, the Women's Cup has followed a single elimination knockout format, consisting of up to four rounds of matches. Eligible teams are those who were defeated in their opening game in the CHA Cup.

== Previous Winners ==
| Season | Women's Plate Winner | Women's Plate Runner Up | Men's Plate Winners | Men's Plate Runner Up |
|---|---|---|---|---|
| 2016-17 | Caradon 2nd XI | Penzance 2nd XI | Truro 2nd XI | Bodmin 2nd XI |
| 2015-16 | Duchy 1st XI | Falmouth 2nd XI | Penzance 2nd XI | Bodmin 2nd XI |
| 2014-15 | St. Austell 1st XI | Newquay 2nd XI | Duchy 2nd XI | Penzance 2nd XI |
| 2013-14 | Duchy 1st XI | Launceston 1st XI | Duchy 1st XI | Camborne SoM 1st XI |
| 2012-13 | Duchy 1st XI | Penzance 2nd XI | Truro 4th XI | Truro 3rd XI |
| 2011-12 | Penzance 2nd XI | Caradon 2nd XI | Penzance 1st XI | Bude 1st XI |
| 2010-11 | Truro 1st XI | Bude 2nd XI | St. Austell 1st XI | Truro 3rd XI |
| 2009-10 | Penzance 1st XI | Truro 1st XI | Camborne SoM 1st XI | Bodmin 2nd XI |
| 2008-09 | Truro 1st XI | Penzance 1st XI | St. Austell 1st XI | Penzance 1st XI |
