= Raise borer =

Machine used in underground mining

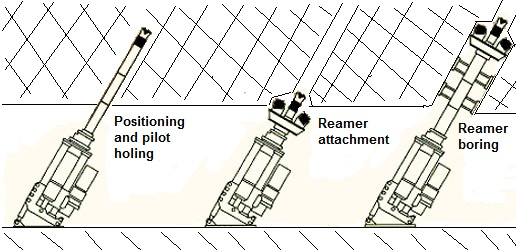
A schematic overview of the machinery used in a raised boring.

A raise borer is a machine used in underground mining, to excavate a circular hole between two levels of a mine without the use of explosives.

The raise borer is set up on the upper level of the two levels to be connected, on an evenly laid platform (typically a concrete pad). A small-diameter hole (pilot hole) is drilled to the level required; the diameter of this hole is typically 230mm – 445mm (9" - 17.5"), large enough to accommodate the drill string. Once the drill has broken into the opening on the target level, the bit is removed and a reamer head, of the required diameter of the excavation, is attached to the drill string and raised back towards the machine. The drill cuttings from the reamer head fall to the floor of the lower level. The finished raise has smooth walls and may not require rock bolting or other forms of ground support. One impressive use of raise boring is the 7.1 m diameter shafts for Sasol's Middelbult and Bosjesspruit Mines in South Africa.

The boxhole borer (or machine roger) is a variant of a raise borer that is used when there is not enough space on the higher of the two levels to be connected. The boxhole borer is set up on the lower level, drills a pilot hole as a guide, then drives the reamer bit along the pilot hole from the lower level to the upper. Precautions have to be taken to redirect falling drill cuttings away from the machine, and to reinforce the drill string.

== See also ==
- 2010 Copiapó mining accident - Rescue
