= Mining Institute of Cornwall =

The Mining Institute of Cornwall was founded in 1876 in Camborne, Cornwall, UK.

The Institute held monthly meetings where papers were read and discussed, and held annual exhibitions of mining machinery and tools.
