= Camborne School of Mines =

College in Cornwall, England

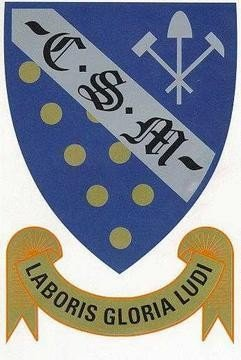
- Motto: Laboris Gloria Ludi
- Type: Public
- Established: 1888
- Director: Professor Pat Foster
- Location: Penryn, Cornwall, UK; 50.1711°N 5.1265°W
- Campus: Penryn Campus
- Patron: Queen Elizabeth II
Colours
Gold, blue, silver
- Website: dees.exeter.ac.uk/csm/

Camborne School of Mines (commonly abbreviated to CSM) is a school of the Department of Earth and Environmental Sciences at the University of Exeter. Its research and teaching is related to the understanding and management of the Earth's natural processes, resources and the environment. It has undergraduate, postgraduate and research degree programmes within the Earth resources, civil engineering and environmental sectors. CSM is located at the Penryn Campus, near Falmouth, Cornwall, UK. The school was founded in 1888 in Camborne and merged with the University of Exeter in 1993.

== Reputation ==
Camborne School of Mines has an international reputation in mining, tunnelling, mineralogy, mineral economics, geology, geophysics and geochemistry. CSM's international reputation dates back to the 19th century when with new deposits found around the world CSM graduates began to seek employment overseas and by the 20th century, graduates were in most of the world's major mining areas such as Southern Africa, Western Africa, Malaysia, Australia, South America, Mexico, United States and Canada.

Through CSM's teaching, research and the CSM Association's (CSM alumni) network CSM maintains a strong presence in the global mining industry.

== Teaching ==
As of 2023, undergraduate degrees available included a BEng degree in mining engineering (the only one offered in the UK), and BSc programmes in geology, resource and exploration geology, environmental geoscience, and engineering geology and geotechnics. The postgraduate MSc degrees included applied geotechnics, minerals engineering, mining engineering, mining geology, and surveying and land/environmental management.

In 2003, CSM joined the Federation of European Mineral Programs (FEMP), allowing its students to participate in study in continental Europe.

The Camborne School of Mines Trust, industrial sponsors, and past students and staff help Camborne School of Mines to offer between 15 and 20 scholarships each year to new students who register on CSM degree programmes. Selection is based primarily on academic achievement.

Candidates successfully completing programmes of study in Camborne School of Mines leading to degrees of the University of Exeter are eligible for additional awards made by the Senate of the University of Exeter on behalf of the Camborne School of Mines Trust. These awards are:

- Associateship of the Camborne School of Mines (ACSM) for BEng and BSc degrees
- Master of the Camborne School of Mines (MCSM) for MSc, MEng, MPhil and PhD degrees

The ACSM and MCSM are two of the few associate awards within the mining and other earth-based industries. The ACSM has been awarded to all graduates of CSM with the required grades since 1910, and in 1974 it was accredited by the Council for National Academic Awards. Notable Associates include Lord Eurby D.S.O., M.C. (born 1883) and Sam E. Jonah (KBE) (ACSM), chief executive of Ashanti Goldfields.

Map showing the location of the Camborne School of Mines within Cornwall.

=== Students ===
The CSM student body is a community within the larger student body of the Combined Universities in Cornwall which includes students from both Falmouth University and University of Exeter Cornwall Campus. The CSM student association organises social events and helps students with any issues. Sport within the school is strong and there are team sports run under the CSM name in local leagues, but are open to any students at Tremough. A key event in the school's sporting calendar is the annual Bottle Match against Royal School of Mines which is organised by the student association.

Each year students take part in the International Mining Games. In 2012 and 2018 CSM hosted the games, at King Edward Mine, a former teaching facility of CSM. The CSM team hosted the games there in 2025, where the men's and women's teams finished in first place in their respective categories, while the CSM co-educational (mixed gender) team finished fourth.

The Camborne School of Mines Association serves all former students of the school and was founded in 1896. It has approximately 1,000 members.

== Research ==
CSM is an internationally recognised centre for research related to the formation, discovery, extraction and utilisation of the Earth's natural resources, and subsequent remediation. The applied nature of much of the research is indicated by significant international industrial collaboration.

Research within CSM is co-ordinated by the three multidisciplinary groups. These draw upon the school's research expertise in mining and minerals engineering, geology, renewable energy and environmental science, and their links with colleagues in the University of Exeter's Department of Geography. Each group is led by full-time academic staff, and includes postdoctoral research fellows, experimental officers and postgraduate research students working towards the degrees of MPhil and PhD. Work is funded by the research councils, industry and charitable trusts and is supported by the school's technical staff and analytical facilities.

== Facilities and services ==
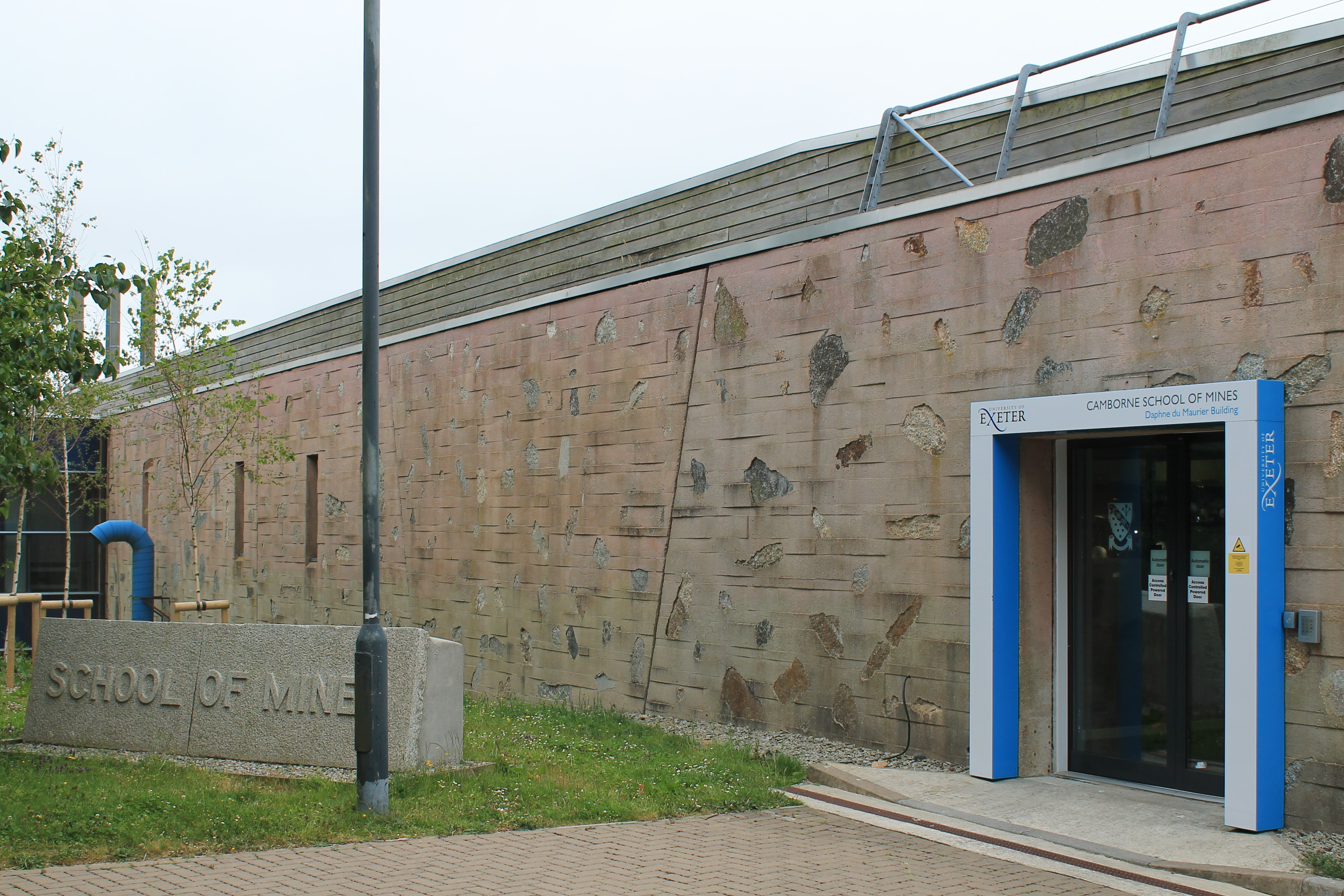
The entrance to Camborne School of Mines at the Daphne du Maurier building, Penryn Campus.

The facilities and services at CSM are available to students, academic staff, research partners, and individuals and organisations from the business community. Short Courses and Continuing Professional Development (CPD) include Renewable Energy Industry Training Modules, and Quarry Shotfiring / Explosives Supervisor courses (EPIC-validated).

The school's geochemical and mineralogical analytical laboratories include a £1.5 million microbeam analytical facility that contains an extensive range of sample preparation and analytical facilities including optical microscopes, cathodoluminescence, low-vacuum scanning electron microscope, electron probe microanalyser, QEMSCAN (particle analysis and mineral identification), X-ray fluorescence spectrometer, X-ray diffraction, atomic absorption spectrometers, atomic fluorescence spectrometer plus elemental, physical and thermal analysers.

Facilities for mining engineering, tunnelling, surveying and geotechnics include surface testing facilities; Leica surveying equipment, a Leica/DMT Gyromat 2000 Precision Gyrotheodolite, and a triaxial test rig.

Field Station

In May 2017 CSM lost the use of its underground field station near Camborne due to the site being sold to a 3rd party, putting an end to blast vibration/underground mining research carried out there and annual student mining induction courses that had been carried out there since the 1960s, when the site was owned & run by Holman Brothers, Camborne.

== Museum ==
The museum at CSM is devoted to worldwide geology with particular emphasis on mining and mineralisation. It holds a significant and comprehensive systematic collection including fluorescent, gem and ore minerals, together with suites of minerals and host rocks from important mining areas all over the world, though a significant part of its collection derives from south west England. The collection serves as a resource centre for geology teaching throughout Cornwall, and is extensively used by the school's teaching. Displays in CSM's entrance foyer are open to visitors, free, Monday to Friday, 0900–1700. The museum also contains historic artefacts relating to the history of mining and CSM's role within this history; this collection is complemented by the King Edward Mine Museum.

== History ==
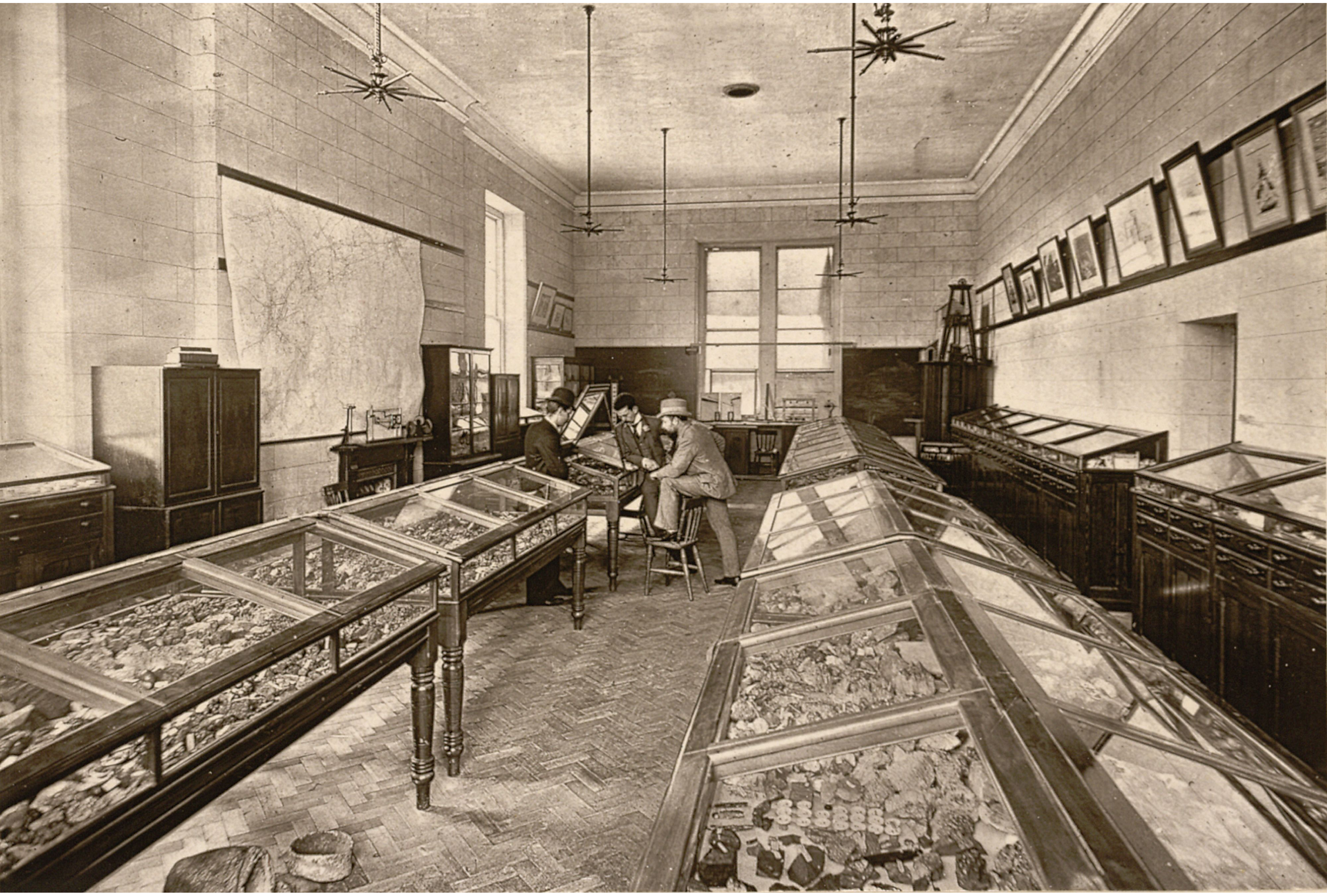
The original School of Mines museum in Camborne, by J C Burrows in 1893.

=== Timeline ===
- 1829 – John Taylor publishes his Prospectus for a School of Mines in Cornwall.
- 1838 – Sir Charles Lemon, offers to establish a school for miners.
- 1839 – Classes for miners start in Truro.
- 1858 – The Miners Association formed.
- 1858 – The Miners Association begin classes in different mining areas of Cornwall such as Camborne, Pool, St Just and St Agnes.
- 1863 – Some 200 students attend classes in eleven mining education centres in Cornwall.
- 1876 – Gustavus Lambert Basset, the great mine entrepreneur, makes a bequest to build a laboratory in Camborne, The Basset building, for the use of the pupils of The Miners Association.
- 1882 – The adjacent Camborne Science and Art School building opened.
- 1887 – J.J. Beringer delivers a lecture to The Miners Association, now called The Mining Institute, in which he outlines new proposals for the establishment of a Mining School.
- 1888 – The Camborne School of Mining is created.
- 1897 – King Edward Mine is leased from the Pendarves family to complement the facilities available to students for practical exercises.
- 1902 – The first Bottle Match is played between CSM and Royal School of Mines (RSM).
- 1910 – The Redruth and Penzance Schools of Mines are amalgamated with Camborne to form the Camborne School of Metalliferous Mining.
- 1913 – The Cornish Institute of Engineers is founded by J.J. Beringer.
- 1924 – King Edward Mine is abandoned due to flooding and Great Condurrow Mine is leased.
- 1935 – The building adjacent to the Basset Memorial Building is purchased, refurbished and equipped, and named the Josiah Thomas Memorial Building.
- 1936 – The Associateship of the Camborne School of Mines (ACSM) is introduced.
- 1955 – The University of Exeter is established by royal charter.
- 1969 – Attempts to merge CSM with Plymouth Polytechnic are aborted.
- 1974 – The ACSM is accredited by the Council for National Academic Awards.
- 1975 – CSM moves to the Trevenson Campus at Pool, Redruth. Associated with a massive re-equipment grant.
- 1979 – Original CSM Building demolished to make way for a Tesco Supermarket.
- 1993 – Merger with University of Exeter.
- 1998 – South Crofty Mine closes with loss of hundreds of jobs in Camborne.
- 2004 – CSM moves to the Tremough Campus in Penryn, in a new building suitable for 21st century, and with a massive re-equipment grant.
- 2020 – The Mining Engineering degree program intake is 'paused' for the first time since it has been offered in its BEng format. CSM was the last institution to offer this in the UK.
- 2023 – Mining Engineering degree program returns, with 3 year full-time BEng, 4 year full-time MEng, 4 year in-service BEng and Mine Management Degree Apprenticeships.

=== Principals/Directors ===
- J. J. Beringer: 1888–1910
- W. Ficher Wilkinson: 1910–1912
- J. J. Beringer: 1912–1915
- A. Richardson: 1918- ~1922
- R. A. Thomas: ~1922-1933
- S. Ball: 1933–1941
- A/Principal G. A. Whitworth: 1941–1946
- G. A. Whitworth, OBE, ACSM, MIMM: 1946–1960
- R.A. Gorges: 1960–1969
- P. Hackett, BSc, PhD, CEng, FIMM: 1970–1994, OBE: 1970-1994
- K. Atkinson, BSc, PhD, C.Eng, C.Geol, FIMMM, FCSM: 1994–2002
- R. J. Pine, BEng, MSc, PhD, MICE, FIMM, CEng, FREng: 2002–2008
- F. Wall, BSc, PhD, FMinSoc, FGS: 2008–2014
- H. Glass, MSc, PhD: 2014-2015 (Acting)
- K. Jeffrey, BSc, MSc: 2015–2021
- S. Hesselbo, BSc, PhD: 2021–2022
- P.J.Foster, BEng, PhD: 2022 –

=== Notable alumni ===
- James Howard Williams, known as Elephant Bill
- Percy Sherwell, Transvaal, MCC and South African Cricketer, and captain of the South African Cricket Team
- Eric Roberts, MI5 agent during WWII
- Sam E. Jonah, former CEO of Ashanti Goldfields Corporation and Chancellor of the University of Cape Coast
- Albert Ernest Thomas, member of the Legislative Assembly of Western Australia from 1901 to 1905, and mine manager of mines in Coolgardie and Norseman
- Arthur Wilson, Cornwall and England rugby union player and member of the British team at the 1908 Summer Olympic Games
- Rex Tremlett, gold prospector, author, and broadcaster
- Geoffrey Healey, automotive engineer, famous for the Austin-Healey marque of motorcars
- Sophie Parkin, writer, artist, poet, and proprietor of an arts club

== See also ==
- The Mining Association of the United Kingdom
- Institution of Mining and Metallurgy
- Mining in Cornwall and Devon
