= William Bickford-Smith =

British politician

William Bickford-Smith (1827 – 24 February 1899) was an English fuse manufacturer and a Liberal and Liberal Unionist politician who sat in the House of Commons from 1885 to 1892.

== Biography ==
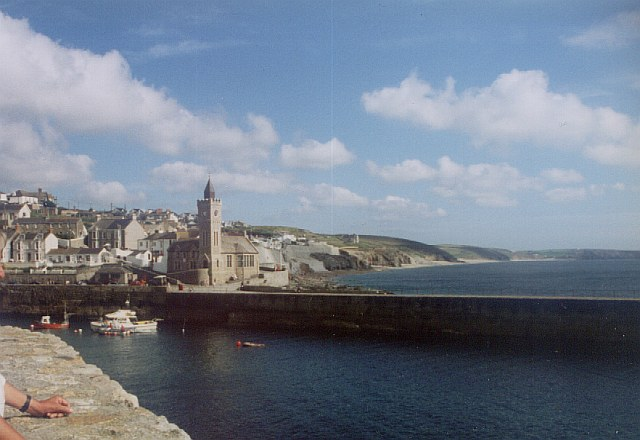
Porthleven; the Bickford-Smith Institute, with its imposing 70 ft clock tower, was built in 1883 as a literary institute by Bickford-Smith

Smith was the son of George Smith of Truro and his wife Elizabeth Burall Bickford. He was educated at Saltash and Plymouth. His grandfather William Bickford had developed a method of making mining fuses using rope which was safer than previous methods and with Smith's father had established a factory at Tuckingmill, Cornwall. Smith became a partner in his father's firm of Bickford, Smith, & Co. and lived near the factory at Camborne. There was another factory at St. Helen's Junction, Lancashire, and Smith was also chairman of Helston Railway. He was also captain in the 15th Cornwall Rifle Volunteers and J.P. for Cornwall. In 1868, he took the additional surname of Bickford, when he inherited the property of his maternal grandfather. Bickford-Smith purchased the Trevarno Estate, at Helston, Cornwall in 1874 and set about developing the gardens.

In 1882 he funded the construction of the Bickford-Smith Institute and clock tower at Porthleven which was built as a scientific and literary institute including a lending and reference library.

Bickford-Smith was elected at the 1885 general election as the Member of Parliament (MP) for Truro. In 1886 he was re-elected as a Liberal Unionist and held the seat until he stood down at the 1892 general election.

Bickford-Smith married Margaret Leaman Venning in 1852. After her death he married Anna Matilda Bond. They were staunch Methodists. He died at the age of 71, in 1899. His son was the barrister and antiquary Roandeau Albert Henry Bickford-Smith. Twin sons were born on 24 December 1881 at Trevarno.

Parliament of the United Kingdom
Preceded by Sir James McGarel-Hogg	Member of Parliament for Truro; 1885–1892	Succeeded by John Charles Williams
Preceded by Edward Brydges Willyams	Member of Parliament for Truro; 1885–1892	Succeeded by John Charles Williams
