= Tuckingmill, Camborne, Cornwall =

Village in Cornwall, England

Coordinates: 50.222°N 5.283°W

Tuckingmill: Cornish: Talgarrek
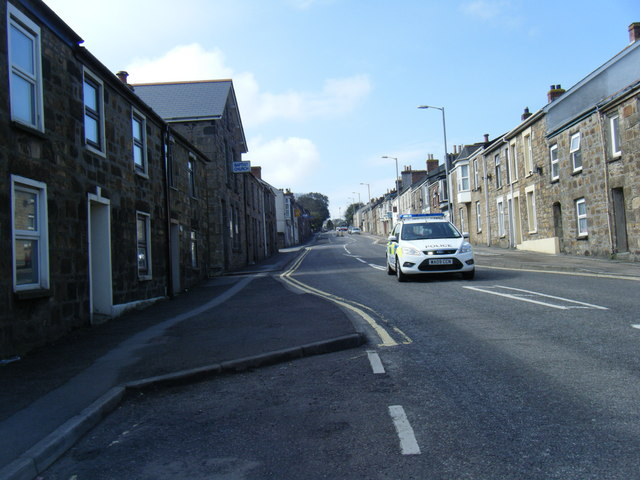
- Pendarves Street, Tuckingmill

- Location within Cornwall
- OS grid reference: SW658405
- Unitary authority: Cornwall
- Ceremonial county: Cornwall
- Region: South West
- Country: England
- Sovereign state: United Kingdom
- Post town: Camborne
- Postcode district: TR14
- Dialling code: 01209
- Police: Devon and Cornwall
- Fire: Cornwall
- Ambulance: South Western
- UK Parliament: Camborne and Redruth

Tuckingmill (Cornish: Talgarrek, meaning hill-brow of a rock) is a village in Cornwall, England, United Kingdom, which is in the civil parish of Camborne. Tucking Mill (Cornish: Melindroghya, from the verb troghya) was the Cornish term for a fulling mill which was where homespun cloth was dipped, cleansed and dressed. There is a mention of a fulling mill in this region as early as 1250. The ecclesiastical parish of Tuckingmill was constituted in 1845, being carved out of a western section of the parish of Illogan and an eastern section of Camborne parish. It covers 1,300 acres (5.3 km^{2}).

== Geography ==
Tuckingmill is a post-industrial village on the A3047, between the former mining towns of Camborne and Redruth. Camborne-Redruth is the largest urban area in Cornwall, and is on the northern side of the Carn Brea/Carnmenellis granite upland, which slopes northwards to the coast.

Cutting north-south is the deeply cut valley of the Red River, which has been exploited for minerals and other industrial processes for centuries. Settlements between Camborne and Redruth were on the original country road which was turnpiked in 1839, later becoming the A30 and now the A3047.

== History ==
Evidence of prehistoric settlement is from the name of nearby Roskear, which refers to a fortified site, probably an Iron Age round (farmstead), and there are records of mills in the Red River valley in the 13th-century.

Mining was probably centuries old, with tin-streaming in the valley, when examples of deep-mined copper were recorded from the late 17th-century. Cook's Kitchen is recorded by 1690, as is Dolcoath, and on a 1748 map, mines are shown at Dolcoath and South Roskear. A copper foundry at Entral was started by Sampson Swaine and other gentlemen of Camborne in 1754, and Long Close, Wheal Crofty and Wheal Susan were mines operating in what is now the built-up area of Tuckingmill. The parish also contained what is said to be the greatest of all Cornish mines, Dolcoath and also the South Crofty Mine, which was at one time the deepest in the world as well as being the last tin mine in Europe, only closing in 1998.

William Bickford took out a patent in 1831 for the safety fuse; a device for igniting gunpowder that saved many lives. With his son-in-law George Smith, he established a factory and in its first year produced 45 miles (72 km) of fuse. Bickford died just before the factory opened.

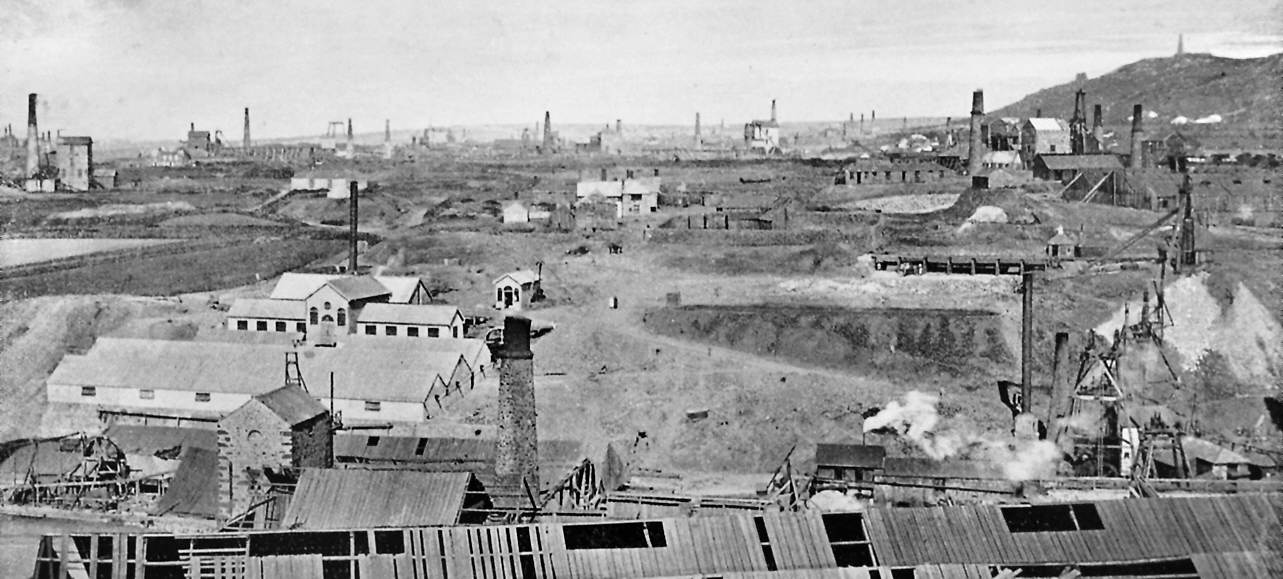
View from Dolcoath Mine towards Redruth, ca 1890

== Religion ==
The parish church of All Saints was built in 1843–44 in the Norman Revival style, with the north aisle having a heavy granite arcade. The architect was John Hayward of Exeter. The Norman font came from the chapel at Menadarva. The church was renovated in 1878–79 by Piers St Aubyn with the raising and tiling of the chancel, removing the tower gallery, replacing the seats and repairing the walls and windows. A reredos with an ″Irish serpentine″ border, inlaid with marble and also designed by Mr Piers St Aubyn was completed in November 1882. The cross is made of alabaster. A new organ, costing £120, was purchased from Hele and Sons of Plymouth. The church was re-opened on Thursday, 20 February 1879.

== Economy and development ==
The area consists of terraced miners' cottages and rather barren industrialisation. With the demise of this economic activity, many thousands of jobs were lost and Tuckingmill became a bleak post-industrialisation urban area. However, around the turn of the millennium, regeneration has picked up and improvements are expected over the next few years. Kerrier Council's bid for £23 million from the BIG Lottery Fund was successful - and announced in November 2007. The grant will be used to re-build the Pool area between Redruth and Camborne (Pool sits at the top of East Hill, immediately next to Tuckingmill).

A Cornish property development firm called Porthia acquired a huge site at the centre of Tuckingmill. The site includes the old Fuseworks building and brownfield land previously mined by South Crofty. It was their intention to transform this site into "New Tuckingmill" – a development of over 400 new homes as well as commercial space and community facilities. Porthia's environmental proposal failed to satisfy Kerrier Council, so it stalled.

However, construction of 67 new affordable homes began at a Tuckingmill site in 2023, following an investment agreement between Cornwall Pension Fund, PGIM Real Estate, and Brunel Pension Partnership.

== Tuckingmill Valley Park ==
This is a green flag accredited, award-winning restored public space. It was regenerated by Cornwall Council having previously been a derelict space.

The Red river flow through the park, and facilities include a skatepark.

It is designated as a strategic park within Kerrier, and is managed by Cornwall Council.

== Notable residents ==
William Bickford, inventor of the safety fuse, lived and worked in Tuckingmill.

Ben Salfield (b.1971), lutenist, author, composer and promoter, lived in Tuckingmill.
