= Barripper =

Village in west Cornwall, England

Coordinates: 50.196°N 5.316°W

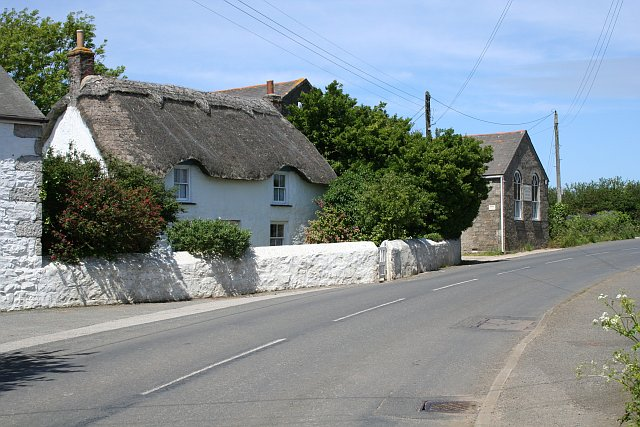
Thatched cottage and disused Methodist Church

Barripper is a village in west Cornwall, England, United Kingdom, (grid reference SW633382) approximately one mile south-west of Camborne . The village has a public house named the St Michael's Mount Inn, so called as an outbuilding on that site was a resting place for druids and saints. Having landed at Godrevy, they followed a riverside trail from there through Roseworthy and Penponds to Barripper, where they were housed for the night, before continuing their pilgrimage to St Michaels Mount.
