= Listed buildings in Eakring =

Eakring is a civil parish in the Newark and Sherwood district of Nottinghamshire, England. The parish contains seven listed buildings that are recorded in the National Heritage List for England. Of these, one is at Grade II*, the middle of the three grades, and the others are at Grade II, the lowest grade. The parish contains the village of Eakring and the surrounding area. All the listed buildings are in the village, and they consist of farmhouses and cottages, a church with a war memorial in the churchyard, a well head, and a former windmill.

== Key ==
| Grade | Criteria |
|---|---|
| II* | Particularly important buildings of more than special interest |
| II | Buildings of national importance and special interest |

== Buildings ==
| Name and location | Photograph | Date | Notes | Grade |
|---|---|---|---|---|
| St Andrew's Church; 53.15241°N 0.99156°W | | 13th century | The church has been altered and extended through the centuries, and it was restored in 1880 by J. P. St Aubyn. It is built in stone with a tile roof, and consists of a nave, north and south porches, a north transept, a chancel, a northeast vestry, and a west tower. The tower has three stages, two string courses, buttresses, moulded eaves with the remains of gargoyles, an embattled parapet, and crocketed corner pinnacles. On the west side is a doorway with a hood mould, above which are the remains of a carved figure and a lancet window. In the middle stages are lancet windows, and the top stage has double bell openings and clock faces. | II* |
| Walnut Tree Cottage; 53.15359°N 0.99558°W | — | Mid 17th century | The house is in rendered brick, on a partial plinth, and has a tile roof. There are two storeys, four bays, and a rear extension. The doorway has moulded jambs and a hood on scrolled brackets. The windows on the front are mullioned casements, and elsewhere there are more casements, horizontally-sliding sashes, and an oriel window. | II |
| Hall Farm House; 53.15379°N 0.99370°W | — | Late 18th century | The farmhouse is in brick, and has rebated and partly dentilled eaves and a slate roof. There are two storeys and attics, and an L-shaped plan with a front of four bays. The doorway has a fanlight and a hood on scrolled brackets, and most of the windows are sashes with segmental heads. | II |
| Pond Farm House; 53.14952°N 0.99178°W | | Late 18th century | The farmhouse is in brick with a pantile roof. There is a central block with three storeys, and flanking wings with two storeys. At the rear is a lean-to and flanking wings. The windows are a mix of casements, and sashes, some of which are horizontally-sliding. | II |
| Well head, Walnut Tree Cottage; 53.15347°N 0.99549°W | — | Late 18th century | The well head at the rear of the cottage is in stone, and consists of a pierced slab with a pair of uprights, a back panel and a capstone. There is a wooden windlass barrel. | II |
| Windmill; 53.15496°N 0.99577°W | | Late 18th century | The former windmill is in brick on a stepped plinth, with cogged eaves, and is without a roof. It consists of a circular tapering tower with five stages. The windows and the doorway openings have segmental heads. | II |
| War memorial 53.15246°N 0.99180°W | | 1919 | The war memorial is in the churchyard of St Andrew's Church, it is in granite, and about 2.5 metres (8 ft 2 in) high. The memorial consists of a Celtic wheel-head cross on a tapering rectangular shaft, on a roughly-hewn trapezoidal plinth. On the front of the wheel-head is interlace decoration, and on the shaft are three blind panels. On three sides of the plinth are recessed panels with an inscription, and the names of those who were lost, injured or who served in the First World War. | II |
