= Roseworthy =

Roseworthy may refer to:

- Roseworthy, Cornwall, a place in England
- Roseworthy, South Australia, a town in Australia
- Roseworthy College, a campus of the University of Adelaide, near the town
