= Penponds =

Village in Cornwall, England

Coordinates: 50.205°N 5.314°W

Penponds: Cornish: Pennpons
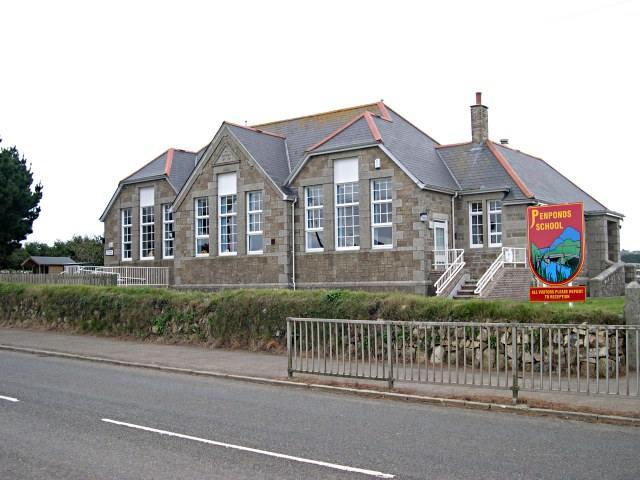
- Penponds School

- Location within Cornwall
- OS grid reference: SW636391
- Civil parish: Camborne
- Unitary authority: Cornwall
- Ceremonial county: Cornwall
- Region: South West
- Country: England
- Sovereign state: United Kingdom
- Post town: CAMBORNE
- Postcode district: TR14
- Dialling code: 01209
- Police: Devon and Cornwall
- Fire: Cornwall
- Ambulance: South Western
- UK Parliament: Camborne and Redruth

Penponds (Cornish: Pennpons) is a village west of Camborne, in west Cornwall, England, United Kingdom.

== Geography ==
To the east is the former mining town of Camborne and to the north is the Penzance to Plymouth railway line. West of the village is the Penponds Viaduct which carries the railway over the Roseworthy valley and to the south is the village of Barripper.

== History ==
Neolithic flints were found at Penponds and are in the Camborne museum. In June 1880 approximately 40 to 50 Bronze Age socketed axes were found in a pit at Viaduct Farm, Higher Roseworthy following the blasting of a large rock to level the ground for a pig-sty. The hoard is now distributed in private collections and between museums in Camborne and Truro. A granite clapper bridge of unknown antiquity is south-west of the village in the Roseworthy valley, as is the site of a post-medieval corn mill which was named on a tithe map from 1725.

The most likely site for Penpons manor house and chapel is at Ivy Cottage in Higher Penponds which has "fragmentary door frame surrounds" of the front left window of the cottage, which appears to be the remnants of a 15th-century rectangular L-shaped building. An inquisition was held in the manor of Penpons and Baripper in 1421 at the Chapel of Blessed Marie of Penpons and in 1445 a licence for divine service was given to Richard and Amisia Penspons. It is likely they were living in the manor house at that time.

Two teenage boys from the area were ordained to the priesthood by Bishop Lacey of Exeter in the early part of the sixteenth century. These two local priests where quite possibly the last Catholic clergy in the area at the time of the Reformation.

North of the village is the extant remains of the Penponds incline, the original course of the first railway line in west Cornwall. The Hayle Railway ran between the harbours of Hayle and Portreath and the mining town of Redruth. Following purchase by the West Cornwall Railway the incline was closed on 16 February 1852, the railway line realigned via the Penponds Viaduct and re-opened on 25 August 1852.

== Notable residents ==
Higher Penponds Farm Cottage was the childhood home of the mining engineer, Richard Trevithick (13 April 1771 – 22 April 1833). The 17th/18th-century cottage is now known as Trevithick Cottage (grid reference SW63743890).

== See also ==
- Holy Trinity Church, Penponds
