= St Andrew's Church, Eakring =

Anglican church in the Southwell/Nottingham diocese

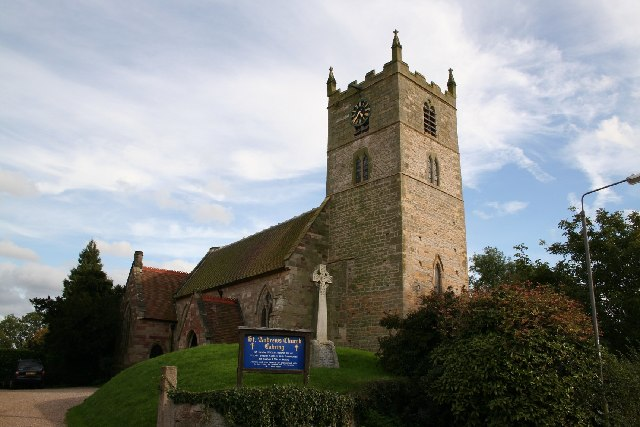
- St Andrew's Church, Eakring
- St Andrew's Church, Eakring
- 52°9′6.32″N 0°59′26.25″W
- Location: Eakring
- Country: England
- Denomination: Church of England
- Website: st-andrews-eakring.org.uk

Architecture
- Heritage designation: Grade II* listed

Administration
- Diocese: Diocese of Southwell and Nottingham
- Archdeaconry: Newark
- Deanery: Newark and Southwell
- Parish: Eakring

St Andrew's Church, Eakring is a Grade II* listed Church of England parish church at Eakring, near Southwell. It belongs to the Deanery of Newark and Southwell in the Diocese of Southwell and Nottingham.

== History ==
The Domesday Survey records a church at Eakring. The first priest to be named appears in the mid–12th century. The parish church dates from the 13th century up to the 15th century, and was thoroughly restored in 1880–1881 by the noted architect James Piers St Aubyn, when the seating was replaced and a vestry added.

The church today consists of a three-stage tower (Early English in style, with Perpendicular turreting), with a chancel and a nave without aisles. Previous restoration in the early 1670s had been conducted by a new Rector, William Mompesson, after the building had become dangerously dilapidated. The font bears a date of 1674.

The north porch has two stone coats-of-arms of Elizabeth I, recovered from a house in the village in the late 19th century. There is a plaque to mark the installation of the tower clock in 1887. The present organ was installed in 1886 – specifications appear in the National Pipe Organ Register.

== Present day ==
A new stained glass window was fitted in 2016. The inscription reads, "Lord, you said that once I decided to follow you, you would walk with me all the way." Another modern window depicts William Mompesson preaching.

A weekly Sunday service is held in the church. St Andrew's belongs now to a group of twelve churches, with Rev. Zoe Burton as Priest-in-Charge.

== See also ==
- Grade II* listed buildings in Nottinghamshire
- Listed buildings in Eakring
