= Penponds Viaduct =

- Coordinates: 50.2051363°N 5.3227177°W
- Carries: Cornish Main Line
- Locale: Penponds, Cornwall
- Preceded by: Hayle Railway structure 1837, then West Cornwall Railway structure 1852

Characteristics
- Material: Brick arches on stone piers.
- Total length: 338 feet (103 m)

History
- Opened: 1888

Location
- Interactive map of Penponds Viaduct

Penponds Viaduct is a railway viaduct which carries the Cornish Main Line west of Camborne in Cornwall, England. It crosses over a small valley containing the southern arm of the Red River, and a minor road known as Viaduct Lane.

The Hayle Railway opened the railway through this site in 1837 to link Hayle and Redruth. To overcome a significant change in elevation an inclined plane was built to the east of the present viaduct. When the West Cornwall Railway took over the route, it built a timber trestle viaduct as part of a more gently graded route which by-passed the inclined plane.

The present-day viaduct was built by the Great Western Railway in 1888 as part of a programme to replace the timber viaducts on the line and prepare the single-track route for double track. It is built of brick arches on stone piers.
