= Joy Lofthouse =

British pilot (1923–2017)

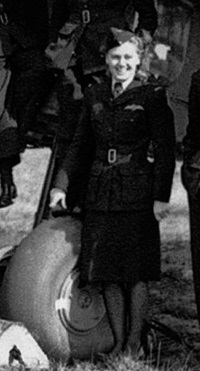
- Born: Joyce Gough; 14 February 1923; Cirencester, Gloucestershire, England
- Died: 15 November 2017 (aged 94)
- Occupation: Aviator
- Employer: Air Transport Auxiliary

Joy Lofthouse (14 February 1923 – 15 November 2017) was a British pilot having joined the Air Transport Auxiliary (ATA) as an ab initio pilot in December 1943. She went on to fly Spitfires and bombers for the Air Transport Auxiliary, and was one of only 168 "Attagirls" who served.

== Early life ==
Lofthouse was born Joyce Gough, but was always known as Joy, in Cirencester and grew up in South Cerney, both in Gloucestershire.

== Career ==
In 1943, 20-year-old Lofthouse and her elder sister Yvonne joined the Air Transport Auxiliary, after they saw an ad in a magazine which was seeking women to learn how to fly. Only 17 out of 2,000 applicants were accepted, including Joy, who had never even driven a car, and Yvonne.

She was one of a total of 168 women who were members of the Air Transport Auxiliary. Her job was to deliver aircraft from the factories where they were made to the airfields where they were to be flown from by Royal Air Force (RAF) pilots. Lofthouse was able to fly 18 different types of aircraft. During the war, they were based at White Waltham, in Berkshire.

After World War II, she became a teacher.

In May 2015, Lofthouse flew a Spitfire for the first time in over 70 years, to commemorate VE Day. She said, "It was the iconic plane, the Spitfire lasted much longer than [the Hurricane] because it was such a wonderful aeroplane, I think. [It is] the nearest thing to having wings of your own and flying."

== Personal life ==
She was married twice and had three children. Her second marriage was to Charles Lofthouse, himself a Royal Air Force (RAF) pilot, and they were married for 30 years until his death in 2002 at the age of 80.

She died in November 2017, at the age of 94. Before she died, Lofthouse was one of the two surviving World War Two "Spitfire Girls".
