= Holy Trinity Church, Penponds =

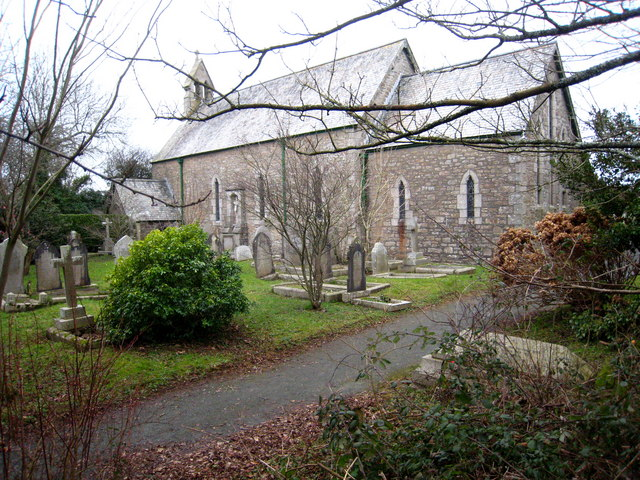
- Holy Trinity Church, Penponds

- Location within Cornwall
- 50°12′24.1″N 05°18′57″W
- OS grid reference: SW 63491 39350
- Location: Penponds, Cornwall
- Country: England
- Denomination: Church of England

History
- Dedication: Holy Trinity
- Consecrated: 16 May 1854

Architecture
- Heritage designation: Grade II listed
- Architect: James Piers St Aubyn

Administration
- Province: Canterbury
- Diocese: Truro
- Archdeaconry: Cornwall
- Deanery: Carnmarth, North
- Parish: Penponds

Holy Trinity Church, Penponds is a Grade II listed parish church in the Church of England in Penponds, Cornwall.

== History ==
The church was consecrated by the Lord Bishop of Exeter on 16 May 1854.

Enlargement and restoration were undertaken in the 1890s. The chancel and vestry were completed in 1897 and the nave, aisle and porch were restored in 1899. A baptistry was added with a carved oak screen on two sides to give thanks for the first confirmation service held in the church on 9 December 1898.

It was refitted between 1896 and 1934 by Canon James Sims Carah, vicar for 39 years. The pulpit was installed in 1901 by Hancock of Bodmin. He designed the new screen, installed in 1925, which was constructed and carved by J.B. Hunt of Plymouth.

== Parish status ==
The church is in a joint benefice with:

- St Martin and St Meriadoc’s Church, Camborne
- All Saints' Church, Tuckingmill

== Stained glass ==
The stained glass windows were inserted between 1907 and 1933 and were designed by Clayton and Bell.

== Organ ==
The organ was obtained second hand from Lowenac House, Camborne in 1901. A specification of the organ can be found in the National Pipe Organ Register.
