= Menadarva =

Hamlet in Cornwall, England

Coordinates: 50.225°N 5.347°W

Menadarva: Cornish: Mertherderwa
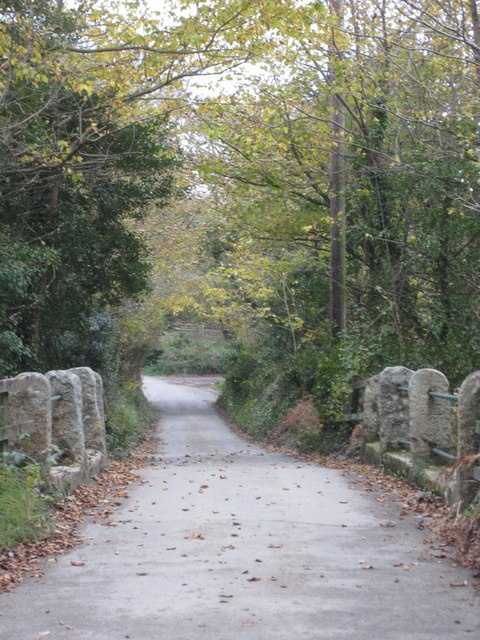
- The bridge over the Red River at Menadarva

- Location within Cornwall
- OS grid reference: SW614415
- Civil parish: Camborne
- Unitary authority: Cornwall
- Ceremonial county: Cornwall
- Region: South West
- Country: England
- Sovereign state: United Kingdom

Menadarva (Cornish: Mertherderwa, meaning grave of St Derwa) is a hamlet in the parish of Camborne, Cornwall, England, UK. The Red River flows through the hamlet and on 9 March 1885 the machinery and materials of the Menadarva Lower Tin-Stream was put up for auction.

The Norman font of the church of All Saints' Church, Tuckingmill came from the medieval chapel of St Derwa at Menadarva.
