= Plastic igniter cord =

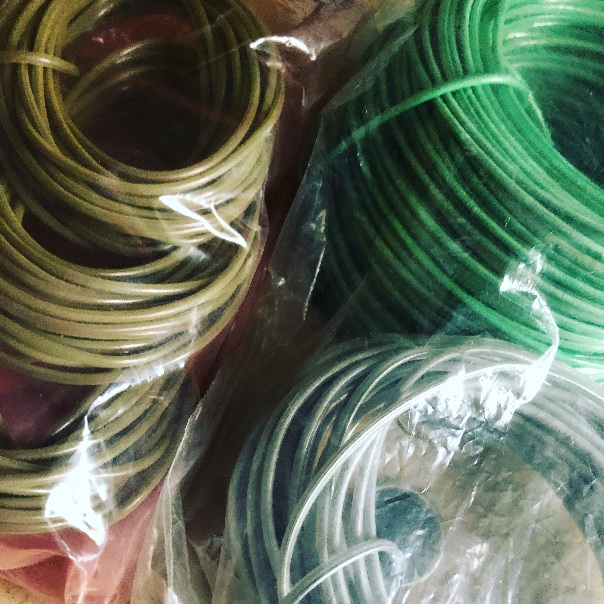
Pyrotechnic fuse

A plastic igniter cord (PIC) is a type of fuse used to initiate an explosive device or charge. In appearance, an igniter cord is similar to a safety fuse and when ignited, an intense flame spits perpendicular to the cord at a uniform rate as it burns along its length.

In the construction and demolition industry an igniter cord is similar to a safety fuse, consisting of a pyrotechnic composition at the core, wrapped with a nylon sheath to provide shape and finally wrapped again in an outer plastic shell to provide water resistance.

Normally, igniter cord also consists of a metal wire at the very center of the pyrotechnic core which also runs the entire length of the cord; the pyrotechnic composition will react with the metal wire (typically aluminum, iron or copper) to increase the energetics of the fuse.

There are two types of PICs: the fast type which has nominal burning speed of 30 cm per second, a diameter of about 3 mm, and is brownish in color; and the slow type, which has a diameter of 2 mm, is greenish in color, and has a nominal burning speed of 3 cm per second.

== Trade names ==
Trade names for PICs include Mantitor cord, manufactured by Orica Brazil, and ICI plastic cord, formerly manufactured by Imperial Chemical Industries in Scotland.

== See also ==
- fuse (explosives)
- Detonating cord
