= Church of All Hallows, South Cerney =

Coordinates: 51.6749°N 1.9292°W

- Church of All Hallows
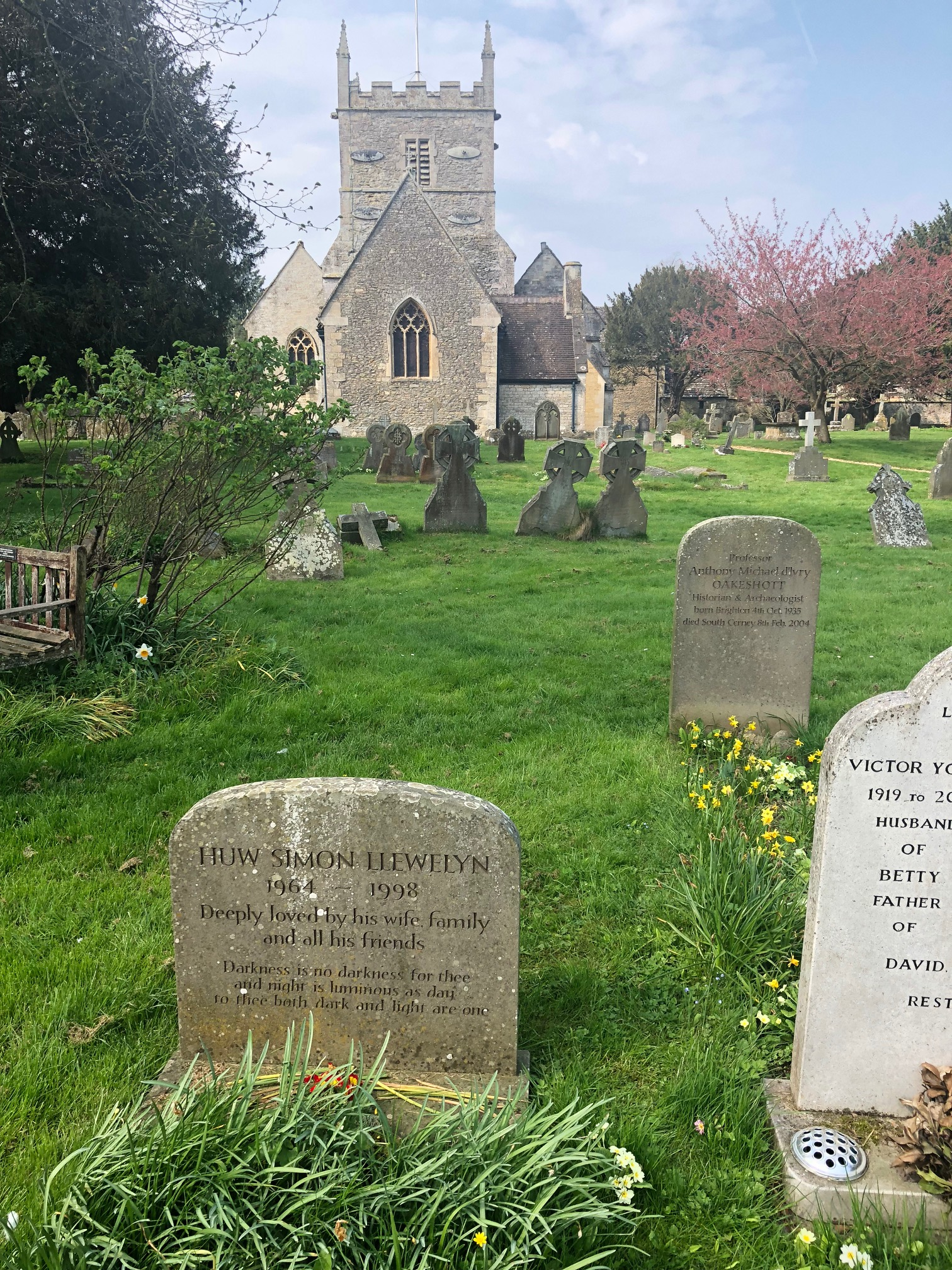
- The church from the churchyard

- Location in Gloucestershire
- Location: South Cerney, Gloucestershire
- Country: England
- Denomination: Church of England
- Website: www.churnsidechurches.org.uk/index.html

History
- Status: Parish church
- Founded: C13th-C14th century

Architecture
- Functional status: Active
- Heritage designation: Grade I
- Designated: 26 November 1958
- Architectural type: Church

Administration
- Diocese: Gloucester
- Parish: South Cerney

Clergy
- Vicar: The Revd Jennifer Mary McKenzie

The Church of All Hallows is an Anglican parish church in the village of South Cerney, Gloucestershire. The church is of Norman origins, with medieval alterations and a major restoration in the 19th century. A Grade I listed building, it remains an active parish church.

== History ==
The origin of the church is Norman, when the benefice was in the possession of Gloucester Abbey. It was repeatedly altered in the medieval period. The spire on the tower was destroyed by lightning in 1857 and never reconstructed. The church was thoroughly restored by James Piers St Aubyn in 1862. All Hallows is an active parish church serving the parishes of South Cerney and Cerney Wick.

An archaeological investigation in the churchyard in 1999 discovered a number of medieval burial pits, which appeared to have been reconstructed in the 19th-century rebuilding.

== Architecture and description ==
The church consists of a central tower, without its original spire, a nave and South aisle, and a chancel of 14th-century origin. The porch is a 19th-century addition. The "very elaborate" doorway is Norman, although moved to its present position by St Aubyn. Pevsner records the similarities to that in the church at Mesland near Blois in France. The interior contains a number of important wall monuments in marble, dating from the 18th and 19th centuries. The church is a Grade I listed building.

=== The South Cerney Christ ===
In 1912, two fragments, a head and a foot, from a large figure of Christ were discovered in a wall cavity in the nave. The Christ, of medieval date, is likely to have been concealed during the Reformation but its history is largely unknown. The two pieces were sold by the church to the British Museum, with the aid of a grant from the Art Fund. Replicas are displayed in the church.

== Sources ==
- Verey, David; Brooks, Alan (2000). Gloucestershire 1: The Cotswolds. The Buildings of England. New Haven, US and London: Yale University Press. ISBN 9780300097337. OCLC 863472443.
