= St Martin and St Meriadoc's Church, Camborne =

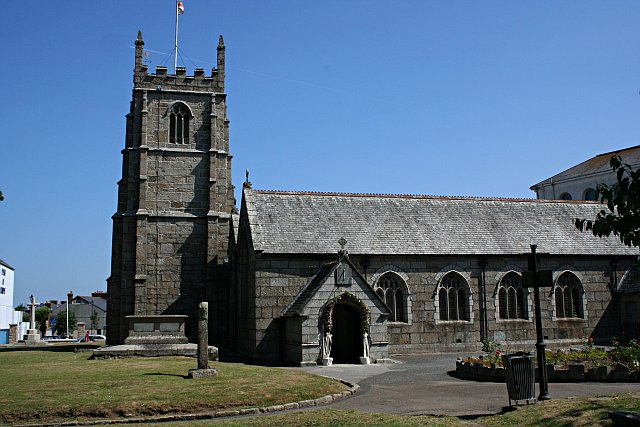
- St Meriadoc's Church, Camborne

- Location within Cornwall
- 50°12′48.4″N 05°18′07″W
- Location: Camborne, Cornwall
- Country: England
- Denomination: Church of England

History
- Dedication: St Martin and St Meriadoc

Administration
- Province: Canterbury
- Diocese: Truro
- Archdeaconry: Cornwall
- Deanery: Carnmarth, North
- Parish: Camborne and Tuckingmill

Listed Building – Grade I
- Official name: Church of St Martin and St Meriadocus
- Designated: 1 December 1951
- Reference no.: 1142659

St Martin and St Meriadoc's Church, Camborne is a Grade I listed parish church in the Church of England in Camborne, Cornwall.

== History ==
The church is medieval, dating largely from the 15th century.

It was restored in 1861-62 when a west gallery which crossed the whole width of the church was removed. New roofs were installed on the chancel, nave and north aisle. The square high pews were replaced with low open seats. The chancel was paved with encaustic tiles, and the rest of the floor was laid with Minton tiles laid in a pattern of red, buff and black. The pulpit was placed on the north side of the chancel. A new granite font was fixed at the west end of the nave. The work was carried out under the supervision of James Piers St Aubyn. The changes resulted in seating for 488 persons. A stained glass window was installed at a cost of £25 in the west tower window by Lavers, Barraud and Westlake of London.

A second restoration took place between 1878 and 1879, again by James Piers St Aubyn, when the opportunity was taken to enlarge it to accommodate an increasing congregation. The main addition was a south aisle, 80 ft long, 65 ft broad and 30 ft high, with four three-light Perpendicular granite windows along its length, and at each end by two five-light Perpendicular granite windows, 13 ft high by 9 ft 6in wide. The old south aisle became the new middle aisle. This increased the capacity of the church by 180 persons. The builder was W. N. Trounson of Camborne and the mason was John Blight of Redruth. A new heating system was installed in a vault beneath the vestry and church which generated heated air piped into the church through large flues. It was installed by Haden and Sons of Trowbridge and consumed around 2 long hundredweight (100 kg) of coal per Sunday. The church was re-opened on 7 August 1879 by Edward Benson, the Bishop of Truro.

== Parish status ==
The church is in a joint benefice with:

- All Saints' Church, Tuckingmill
- Holy Trinity Church, Penponds

== Monuments ==
The church contains monuments and memorials to the following:

- Sir William Pendarves (d. 1683)
- Sir William Pendarves (d. 1726) by James Paty the Elder of Bath
- Any Acton (d. 1780) by F. Robins of Bath
- Grace Percival (d. 1763)
- Edward William Wynne Pendarves (d. 1853) by Edward Hodges Baily

== Organ ==
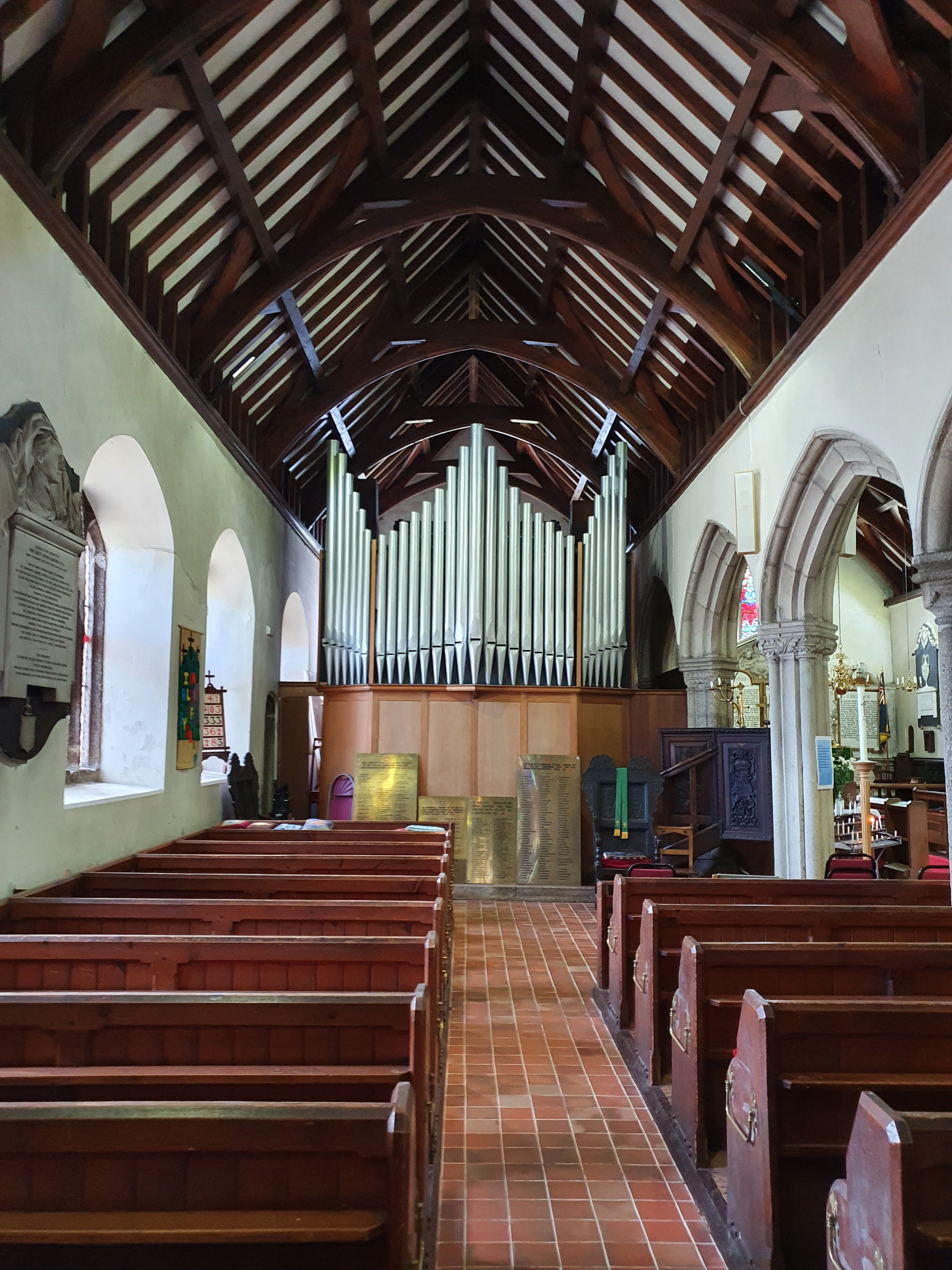
The church's north aisle and organ

A two manual organ by John Nicholson was opened on 8 November 1868. It comprised two speaking fronts (west and chancel), with the following stops: Open diapason, dulciana, flute, stop diapason, principal, fifteenth, sesquialtera, trumpet, 16 feet open pedal, and swell piccolo. The swell contained bourdon, bell diapason, stop diapason (metal), principal and cornopean. The pedal organ comprised bourdon and principal. Mr. E.P. Thomas of Camborne was appointed organist.

The organ was reconstructed in 1901 by T.W. Spraggs of Redruth when the console was moved form the west end of the north aisle to its present position. It was expanded to three manuals in 1929 by George Osmond of Taunton. In 1954–55, Hele & Co of Plymouth rebuilt it with tubular pneumatic action.

A specification of the organ can be found in the National Pipe Organ Register.

== Bells ==
The peal of eight bells in the tower comprises 5 by Thomas Rudhall dating from 1767 and 3 by John Taylor and Company from 1882.
