= All Saints' Church, Tuckingmill =

All Saints’ Church, Tuckingmill
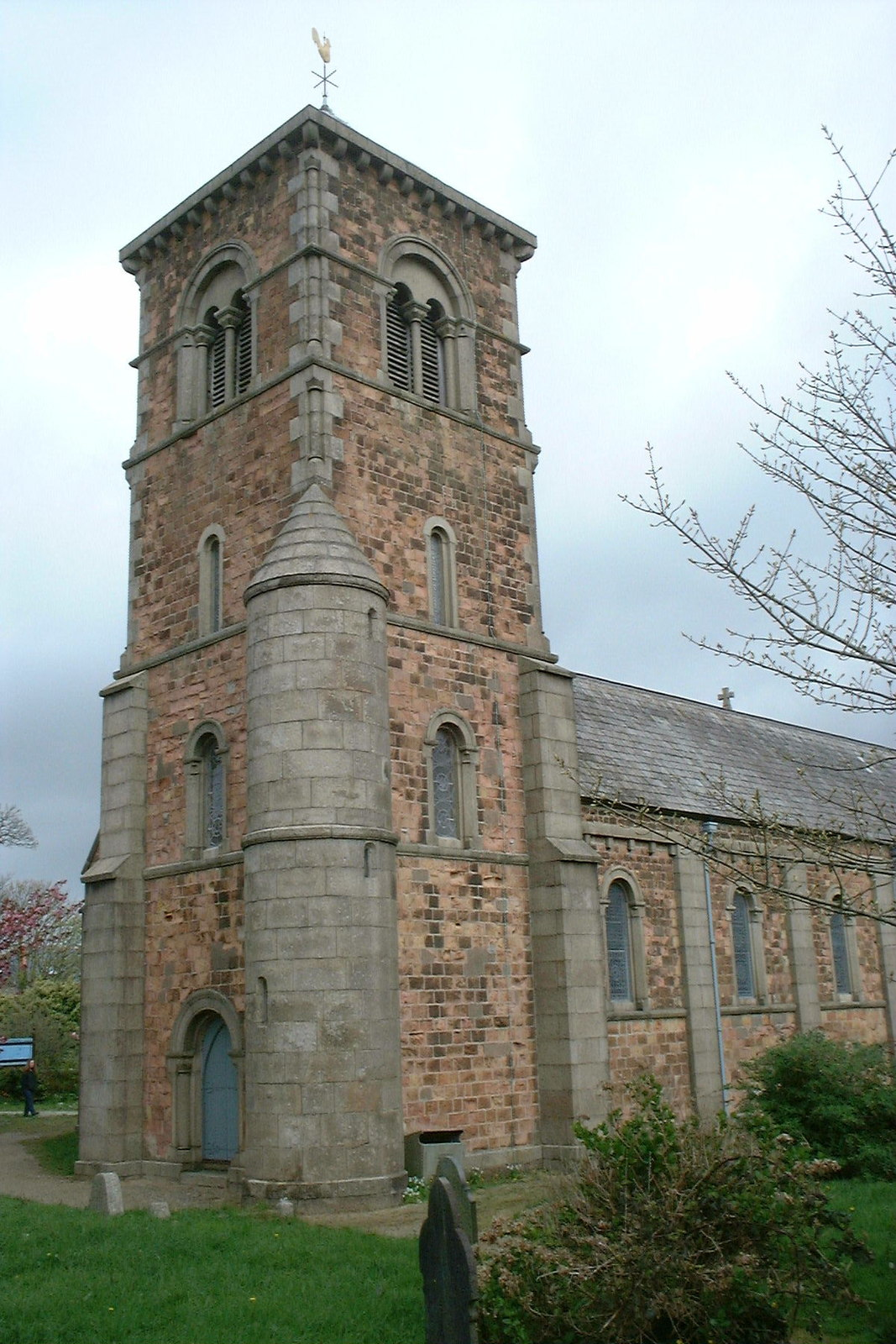
- All Saints’ Church, Tuckingmill

- Location within Cornwall
- 50°13′12.3″N 05°17′09″W
- OS grid reference: SW 65729 40732
- Location: Tuckingmill, Camborne, Cornwall
- Country: England
- Denomination: Church of England

History
- Dedication: All Saints
- Consecrated: 21 July 1845

Architecture
- Heritage designation: Grade II listed
- Architect: John Hayward of Exeter
- Style: Norman Revival style
- Groundbreaking: 31 August 1843

Administration
- Province: Canterbury
- Diocese: Truro
- Archdeaconry: Cornwall
- Deanery: Carnmarth, North
- Parish: Camborne and Tuckingmill

All Saints’ Church, Tuckingmill is a Grade II listed parish church in the Church of England in Pendarves Street, Tuckingmill, Camborne, Cornwall.

== History ==
The foundation stone for the new church was laid with the following inscription

The foundation stone of this Church, dedicated to All Saints, was laid to the Glory of God and for the Salvation of Man, by the Rt. Hon. the Baroness Basset of Tehidy, on 31st day of August 1843.

The parish church of All Saints was built in the Norman Revival style, with the north aisle having a heavy granite arcade. The architect was John Hayward of Exeter. The Norman font came from the chapel at Menadarva. It was consecrated by the Lord Bishop of Exeter on 21 July 1845.

The church was renovated in 1875–79 by Piers St Aubyn with the raising and tiling of the chancel, removing the tower gallery, replacing the seats and repairing the walls and windows. The contractor was Mr. W. May of Pool.

A reredos with an ″Irish serpentine″ border, inlaid with marble and also designed by Mr Piers St Aubyn was completed in November 1882. The cross is made of alabaster. The church was re-opened on Thursday, 20 February 1879.

== Parish status ==
The church is in a joint benefice with:

- St Martin and St Meriadoc’s Church, Camborne
- Holy Trinity Church, Penponds

== Stained glass ==
The east window dates from 1847 and was designed by Joseph Bell. The rest of the stained glass is from the 1890s by Fouracre and Watson or Fouracre and Son of Plymouth.

== Organ ==
A new organ, costing £120 (equivalent to £12,900 in 2025), of nine speaking stops was purchased from Hele and Sons of Plymouth in 1879. A specification of the organ can be found in the National Pipe Organ Register.

== Bells ==
The peal of eight bells in the tower comprises 8 by John Taylor and Company. Originally installed as a ring of 6 in 1931, the ring was expanded with the addition of two bells in 1936.
