= George Smith (historian) =

English businessman, historian and theologian

George Smith (31 August 1800 – 30 August 1868) was an English businessman, historian and theologian. He is now best known for historical work relating to the Methodist conference.

== Life ==
Born at Condurrow, near Camborne, Cornwall, on 31 August 1800, he was the son of William Smith, a carpenter and small farmer at Condurrow (died 1852), by his wife, Philippa Moneypenny (died 1834). He was educated at the British and Foreign schools in Falmouth, and in Plymouth where his father retired in 1808, when the lease of his farm expired. In 1812 he returned with his parents to Cornwall, and was employed for several years in farm work and carpentering. Having accumulated a small sum of money, he became a builder in 1824.

Smith then became a business partner of William Bickford, his father-in-law. He took out patents for improvements in safety fuses, by himself or with others, and built up a fortune in business. He was chairman of the Cornwall Railway to January 1864, overseeing the construction of the line from Plymouth to Truro and Falmouth. He was known locally also for his powers of speaking and lecturing, in 1823 became a local preacher for the Wesleyan Methodists, and was seen as one of their leading laymen. He was a member of the Royal Asiatic Society, of the Society of Antiquaries of London (23 December 1841), of the Royal Society of Literature, and of the Irish Archaeological Society. In 1859 he was created LL.D. of New York.

Smith died at his house, Trevu, Camborne, on 30 August 1868, and was buried in the Wesleyan Centenary Chapel cemetery on 4 September. His widow died at Trevu on 4 March 1886, aged 81, and was buried in the same cemetery on 9 March.

== Works ==
The writings of Smith included:

- An Attempt to ascertain the True Chronology of the Book of Genesis, 1842.
- A Dissertation on the very Early Origin of Alphabetical Characters, 1842.
- Religion of Ancient Britain to the Norman Conquest, 1844; 2nd edit. 1846; 3rd edit. revised and edited by his eldest son, 1865.
- Perilous Times, or the Aggressions of Antichristian Error, 1845, an attack on Tractarianism.
- The Cornish Banner: a Religious, Literary, and Historical Register, 1846–7; published in monthly numbers, July 1846 to October 1847, both inclusive, at Smith's expense.
- Sacred Annals: vol. i. The Patriarchal Age, 1847 (2nd edit. revised, 1859); vol. ii. The Hebrew People, 1850; vol. iii. The Gentile Nations, 1853. The three volumes were reissued at New York in 1850–4.
- Wesleyan Ministers and their Slanderers, 1849; 2nd edit. 1849, referring to the charges of the Fly Sheets affair, and the action of the expelled ministers, Dunn, Everett, and Griffiths.
- Doctrine of the Cherubim, 1850.
- Polity of Wesleyan Methodism exhibited and defended, 1851.
- Doctrine of the Pastorate, 1851; 2nd edit. 1851.
- Wesleyan Local Preachers' Manual, 1855.
- Harmony of the Divine Dispensations, 1856.
- History of Wesleyan Methodism: vol. i. Wesley and his Times, 1857; vol. ii. The Middle Age, 1858; vol. iii. Modern Methodism, 1861; a second and revised edition came out in 1859–62, and the fourth edition appeared in 1865.
- The Cassiterides, or the Commercial Operations of the Phœnicians in Western Europe, with particular reference to the British tin trade, 1863.
- Book of Prophecy: a Proof of the Plenary Inspiration of Holy Scripture, 1865.
- Life and Reign of David, 1868. A companion work on Daniel was left incomplete.

== Family ==
Smith married at Camborne church, on 31 October 1826, Elizabeth Burrall, youngest daughter of William Bickford and Susan Burrall. They had four children, the eldest of whom, William Bickford-Smith, represented in parliament the Truro division of Cornwall from 1885 to 1892.

== Notes ==
Attribution

This article incorporates text from a publication now in the public domain: Lee, Sidney, ed. (1898). "Smith, George (1800-1868)". Dictionary of National Biography. Vol. 53. London: Smith, Elder & Co.
