= William Bickford (1774–1834) =

English inventor

- Born: 1774; Ashburton, Devon, England, United Kingdom
- Died: 1834 (aged 60)
- Occupations: Inventor, currier
- Known for: Being the inventor of the safety fuse used in mining operations
- Relatives: William Bickford-Smith (grandson)

William Bickford (1774–1834) was an English inventor, who, formerly a currier, invented the safety fuse for use in mining.

== Early life ==
William Bickford was born in Ashburton, Devon, England, United Kingdom to William and Mary Bickford. He moved to first Truro and then Tuckingmill in Cornwall. Tuckingmill was then in the heart of the Cornish mining industry, and Bickford would have been aware of the large loss of life from explosive accidents in the mines.

== Inventor career ==
He is best known as the inventor of the safety fuse, which was inspired by watching a friend, James Bray making rope. With his son-in-law George Smith, he established a factory in Tuckingmill for the production of his invention, and in its first year it produced 45 miles of fuse. He died a short while before his company actually started up. It took a while for miners to use the safety fuses, for the old ones were cheaper. His company eventually became part of the Ensign-Bickford Company.

On the south side of the main street, at the bottom of Tuckingmill, set in a wall, was (certainly prior to 1990) an inscribed stone which amongst other things credited his daughter with the inspiration/possible invention of the safety fuse.

Bickford's grandson William Bickford-Smith became MP for Truro.

== Death ==
Bickford died in the Parish of Camborne, Cornwall on 2 October 1834.

== Sources ==
- William Bickford biography
- The Bickford Fuse by Andrey Kurkov review – a Soviet Pilgrim’s Progress
