= South Cerney =

Village in the Cotswold district of Gloucestershire, United Kingdom

Coordinates: 51.671°N 1.932°W

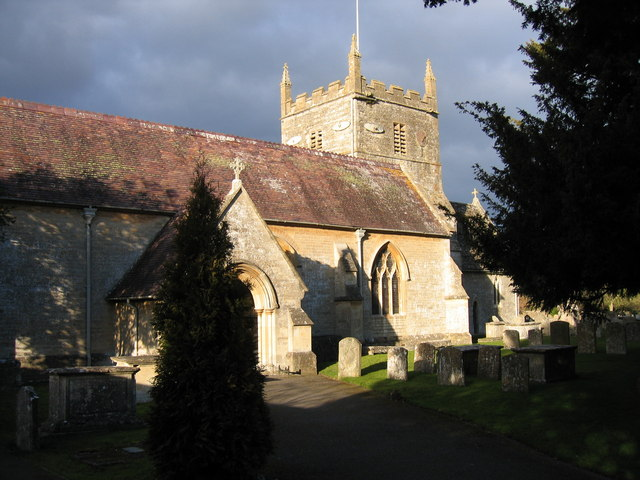
- Church of All Hallows, South Cerney

- Location within Gloucestershire
- Population: 3,464 (2011 census)
- Civil parish: South Cerney
- District: Cotswold
- Shire county: Gloucestershire
- Region: South West
- Country: England
- Sovereign state: United Kingdom
- Post town: Cirencester
- Postcode district: GL7
- Police: Gloucestershire
- Fire: Gloucestershire
- Ambulance: South Western
- UK Parliament: South Cotswolds

South Cerney is a village and civil parish in the Cotswold district of Gloucestershire, 3 miles south of Cirencester and close to the border with Wiltshire.

It had a population of 3,074 according to the 2001 census, increasing to 3,464 at the 2011 census. In 2001 South Cerney was winner of the Bledisloe Cup for the best-kept village in Gloucestershire (large village class), having previously won the award in 1955.

== Etymology ==
The name Cerney is first attested in Old English in 852 CE, when it was recorded that King of the Mercians granted lands in Cerney to a man called Alfeah. It is again attested in charters of the 990s associated with King Aethelred II, in the form æt Cyrne, meaning 'on the River Churn' (the origin of whose own name is ancient, but whose etymology is obscure). To this was added the Old English word ēa ('river'), first attested in the form Cernei (and variant spellings like it) in the Domesday Book of 1086. Thus Cerney meant 'the river Churn'. The addition of the word South, distinguishing the settlement from North Cerney, is first attested in 1274.

The parish also contains Cerney Wick, which includes the Old English word wic, meaning 'outlying farmstead'. Thus this name once meant 'satellite farmstead of Cerney'. This name is first attested as Cernewike in 1220.

== Church of All Hallows, South Cerney and Ann Edwards School ==
Two fragments of a carved wooden crucified Christ, a head and a foot, were found in 1915 concealed in a wall of the village church. The crucifix was probably hidden at the time of the Reformation but mostly disintegrated due to the damp. Part of a crucifix that dates from the 12th century, it is one of very few early-medieval wooden sculptures of Christ extant in England, and would have been part of the 'rood' that stood above the rood screen that separated the nave of the church from the chancel. The original carvings were purchased by the British Museum in 1994. The South Cerney church now contains a replica.

At the end of Silver Street in South Cerney is the Ann Edwards School, founded by Ann Edwards in 1834. And in nearby Station Road, an attractive row of gabled cottages dates from the 16th and 17th centuries. The remains of some of the old railway line can also be found in this area of the village.

== Culture ==
The Village is home to an active theatre group called the South Cerney Players, as well as two active singing groups, Bluenotes and Singing for Fun.

== Tourism and recreation ==
The village lies within the Cotswold Water Park, an area made up of over 140 lakes, mostly formed by gravel extraction. Many of the lakes are now used for leisure activities including fishing and sailing. South Cerney Sailing Club is in the Cotswold Water Park.

The village is home to the South Cerney Outdoor Education Centre, which was created in 1971 by Gloucestershire County Council as a non-profit organisation to promote outdoor learning and provide low-cost outdoor activities for young people.

The annual Street Fair and Duck Race is a local festival held over the weekend of the second May bank holiday. The Street Fair was started by All Hallows church over 30 years ago and since then it has grown and developed into a major event. It supports the work of the church, provides opportunities for local organisations and raises funds for charities.

The village is home to Beaver, Cubs and Scouts, meeting on Thursday evenings, and Guides who meet on Tuesday evenings, all at The Jim Denley Scout Headquarters in Berkeley Close. The Brownie Pack meet in the village hall in School Lane on Wednesdays from 5:45-7:00pm.

== Wayside Cross ==
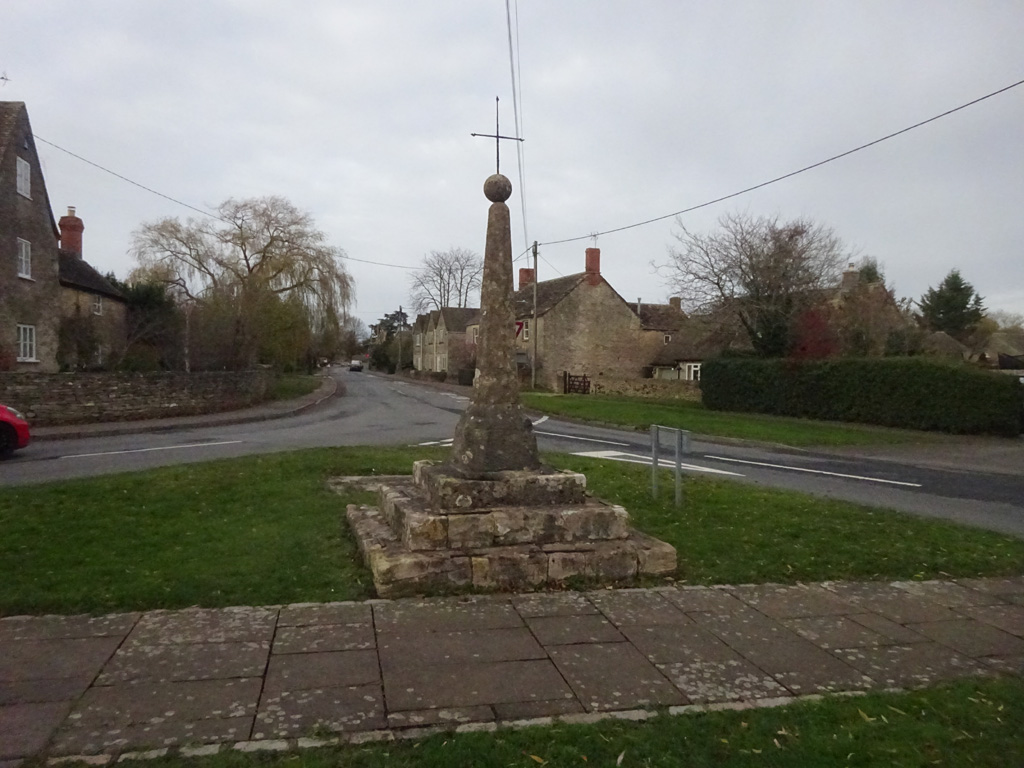
South Cerney Wayside Cross

A medieval Wayside Cross (Grade II Listed building) sits at the junction of High Street and Silver Street. It has an old shaft, base & steps in a new cross. It was the place for pilgrims to stop and pray for good luck on their journey. Probably used as the focus for market traders to vend their produce as well. There is a cut OS benchmark on the base representing 90.2 m Above Seas Level.

Social activities

- South Cerney Flower Show
- South Cerney Gardening Club
- The C.O.S.Y Club (Cerney Over Sixty Years Club).
- South Cerney Stragglers
- Cerney Lakes Tennis Club
- Thursday Group
- Cafe Society
- Village Social Lunch
- Curry Club

== Local amenities ==
South Cerney has a range of local amenities including a One Stop, Co-Op, hairdressers, a fish and chip shop, an Indian restaurant/takeaway, pharmacy and a dental surgery. There are three public houses in the centre of South Cerney, The Old George Inn, The Royal Oak and The Eliot Arms Hotel. Further afield on the outskirts are a range of other, similar amenities such as the Lakeside Brasserie and the South Cerney Angling clubhouse. There is a Village Hall and Fenton's Community Centre. The village formerly had a Post Office and newsagents, however in the early 2020s both closed and are now the site of a small cafe.

Duke of Gloucester Barracks, on the site of the former RAF South Cerney, is located approximately 1 mile outside the Village. In 1986 RAF South Cerney hosted the World Aerobatic Championships.

It is also home to South Cerney Golf course & Driving Range. South Cerney is a par 70 - 5,987yrds course.

== Ann Edwards Primary School ==
Ann Edwards School is also located within the village. The name of the school was adopted when the buildings were located on the present site in 1970.

Ann Edwards lived in South Cerney and was actively involved in education in the early 19th century. She was the wife of the village curate and ran a dame school. When her husband unexpectedly came into money, she endowed the first school building which was opened in 1820. It was a Church of England Foundation School and there were 29 pupils in 1867. The colours of the coat of arms of Ann Edwards - black and gold - have been adopted as the colours of the school uniform in memory of the founder.

The original building still stands in School Lane; it was used as a school until 1972 when it was outgrown and children moved to buildings on the present site. These were demolished in 1990, having been replaced by a modern, purpose-built school.

The present school is a Voluntary Controlled Church of England Primary School. It serves the communities of South Cerney, Cerney Wick, and Somerford Keynes. The current Headteacher, Miss Helen Sowden was appointed as Headteacher with effect from September 2014, following the death of Headteacher, Stephen Richardson.

The school was designed as a semi open-plan building by a local architect and stands on a landscaped site of approximately six acres.

The re-built school was formally opened by Pam Ayres in 1990.

== Wildlife and fossil discoveries ==
South Cerney is well endowed with numerous land and water dwelling species including the water vole, otter, breeding and wintering birds, and bats.

Several mammoth bones and Neanderthal stone tools from the last Ice Age were found by a local couple in a quarry at Cerney Wick.

== Governance ==
South Cerney has an active Parish Council, currently with 10 members. The Clerk is Robert Cowley and the current Chair is local resident Marcus Price.

Cotswold District Council undertook a boundary review which resulted in the former 'Water Park' Ward being replaced. As of May 2015 the village was split into two District Council Wards, 'South Cerney Village' which elected Liberal Democrat Councillor Juliet Layton and 'Siddington and Cerney Rural' which elected Mike Evemy also a Liberal Democrat. Both were elected in the 2019 local elections.

=== South Cerney Village Ward ===
South Cerney Village
Party	Candidate	Votes	%	±%
Liberal Democrats	Juliet Layton	565	83.7	+35.1
Conservative	Margaret Saunders	110	16.3	−13.5
Majority		455	67.4	
Turnout			33.0	
Liberal Democrats hold		Swing		

=== Siddington and Cerney Rural Ward ===
Siddington and Cerney Rural Ward
Party	Candidate	Votes	%	±%
Liberal Democrats	Mike Evemy	565	71.4	+22.9
Conservative	Richard Davies	226	28.6	−22.9
Majority		339	42.8	
Turnout			38.1	
Liberal Democrats gain from Conservative		Swing		

== Development ==
There are several industrial areas which have sprung up on the outskirts of South Cerney, bringing more requirements for housing and a large estate was built on the land sold by Aggregate Industries some years ago.

South Cerney has a growing business community with many companies occupying the industrial and business estates that have built up on the outskirts of South Cerney.

== Transportation ==
Cirencester is located at the hub of a significant road network with important routes to Gloucester (A417), Cheltenham (A435), Warwick (A429 "Fosseway"), Oxford (A40 via the B4425), Swindon (A419), Chippenham (A429), Bristol and Bath (A433), and Stroud (A419).

The nearest railway station is a few miles away at Kemble which is on the main line to London (Paddington).

The nearest airports are at Bristol, Cardiff and Birmingham, all more than an hour away by road.

== Notable people from South Cerney ==
- George Brown, American politician
- Grace Eleanor Hadow, author and scholar
- William Henry Hadow, musicologist and educational reformer
- Dave King, actor and singer
- Joy Lofthouse, pilot
- Sir Neville Poole, politician
- James Piers St Aubyn, architect

== See also ==
- South Cerney Castle
- Cerney Climate Action
