= James Piers St Aubyn =

English architect (1815-1895)

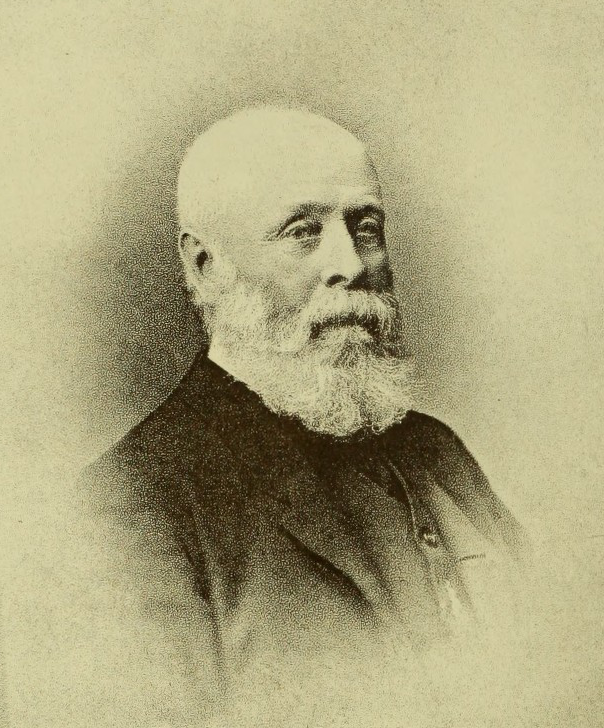
- Born: 6 April 1815; Powick, Worcestershire, England
- Died: 8 May 1895 (aged 80); Chy-an-Eglos, Marazion, Cornwall
- Occupation: Architect
- Practice: St. Aubyn & Wadling
- Projects: St Michael's Mount

James Piers St Aubyn (6 April 1815 – 8 May 1895), often referred to as J P St Aubyn, was an English architect of the Victorian era, known for his church architecture and confident restorations.

== Early life ==
St Aubyn was born at Powick Vicarage, Worcestershire, in the English Midlands, the home of his maternal grandfather, on 6 April 1815. He was the second son of the Rev Robert Thomas St Aubyn and his wife, Frances Fleming St John, and a cousin of John St Aubyn, 1st Baron St Levan, of St Michael's Mount, Cornwall. He was known to his family and friends by his second Christian name of Piers (sometimes spelt Pearse). He was educated at Penzance Grammar School before beginning his studies in architecture.

He married Eliza Phillpott in 1852 at Stoke Damerel, Devon. Eliza was born in Ceylon in 1816 and died on 13 September 1881 at their home, 108 Cambridge Street, Hanover Square, London.

Actor James Bolam is descended via his maternal line from St. Aubyn.

== Career ==
He was articled to Thomas Fulljames (1808–1874) in Gloucester and acted as clerk of works for the latter's Edwards College, South Cerney (Glos) in 1838–39. He was elected to the Royal Institute of British Architects in 1837, on the nomination of George Basevi, Edward Blore and William Railton, and became a Fellow of the Institute in 1856, proposed by Benjamin Ferrey, Giles Gilbert Scott, and Francis Penrose. He twice served on the Council of the Institute (in 1858–1860 and 1870–1872). He was Surveyor to the Middle Temple in London from 1851 until 1885, and practised from Lambe Buildings in the Temple for much of his career. From about 1885 onwards, when he seems to have semi-retired, St. Aubyn worked in partnership with Henry John Wadling (d 1918), who entered his office as a pupil in 1858 and remained as his assistant and managing clerk. St Aubyn died on 7 May 1895 at Chy-an-Eglos, Marazion (Cornwall), and is buried on St Michael's Mount. H J Wadling succeeded to his practice, and continued to trade as "St Aubyn & Wadling".

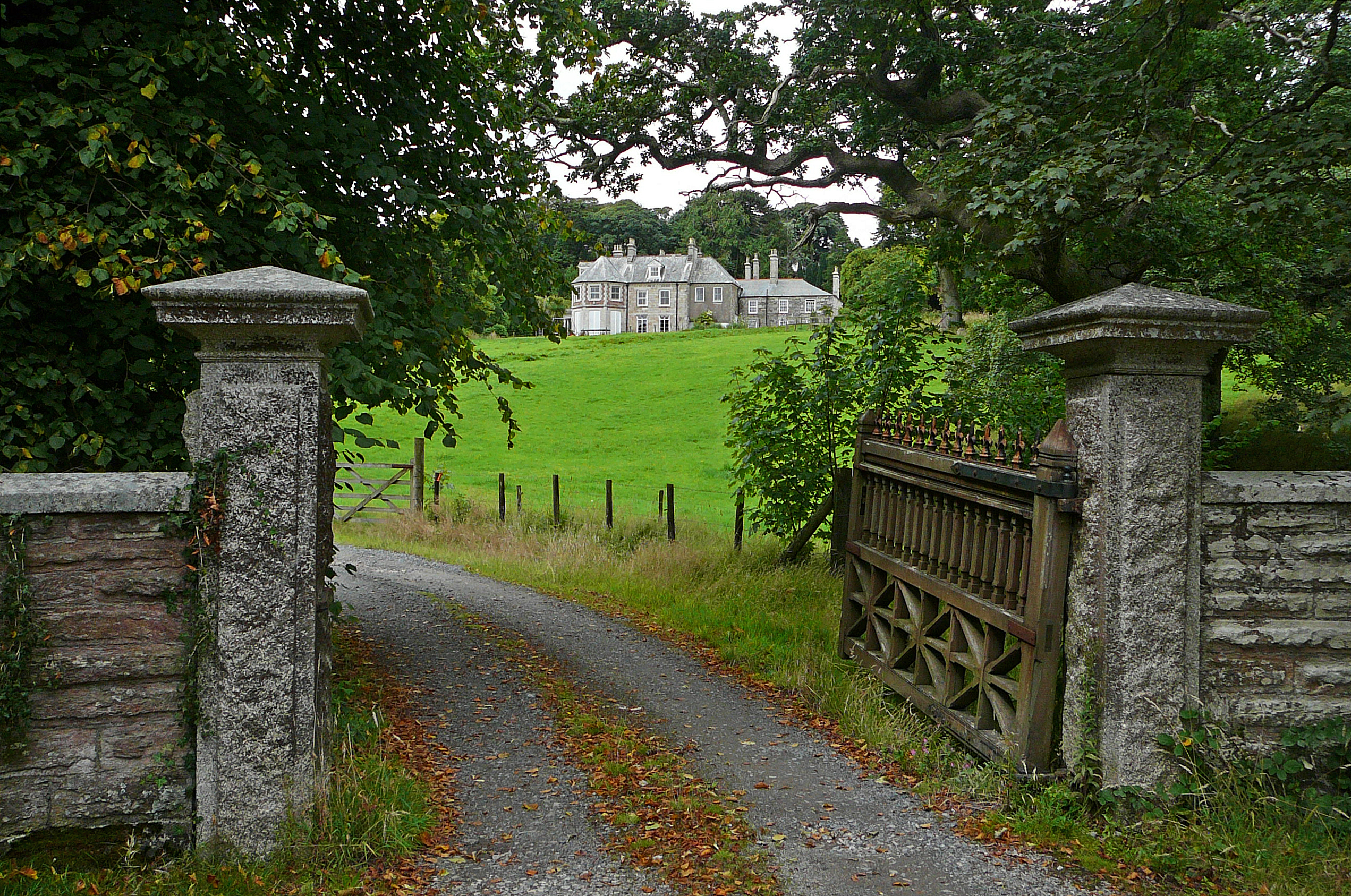
Trevince, Gwennap

St Aubyn was undoubtedly assisted in developing his career by his family's prominence in Devon and Cornwall, and particularly in Devonport, where they were the major landowners. He practised chiefly in London and developed a practice which extended all over southern England, but he also kept an office in Devonport for part of his career, and he was employed particularly extensively in Devon and Cornwall. Apart from this local connection, there are clusters of his work in Gloucestershire (no doubt deriving from his years in Fulljames' office), Kent, Reading, Cambridgeshire and Leicestershire.

He was primarily a church architect, building a considerable number of new churches and undertaking even more restorations. His church work was firmly in the Gothic Revival mainstream of his time, rarely departing from the forms and decoration of the Decorated period, and lacks much originality or flair. His churches at All Saints, Reading and St Mary, Tyndalls Park, Bristol, are notably similar. His restorations often amounted to wholesale or partial rebuilding, and were seen by later generations as unnecessarily brutal; Sir John Betjeman was among St Aubyn's 20th-century detractors. St Aubyn also designed a number of country houses, mostly in a rather cheerless early Gothic style. The one whimsical building he is known to have designed is the clock tower in the grounds of Abberley Hall, c 1883. His greatest professional disappointment was his failure to secure the commission to build Truro Cathedral, which he lost by one vote to John Loughborough Pearson; his designs for the Cathedral were published in Building News, 20 December 1878. His most notable achievement was the restoration of St Michael's Mount, described by Nigel Nicolson as: "among the greatest achievements of 19th-century architecture".

== List of works ==
=== 1840s ===
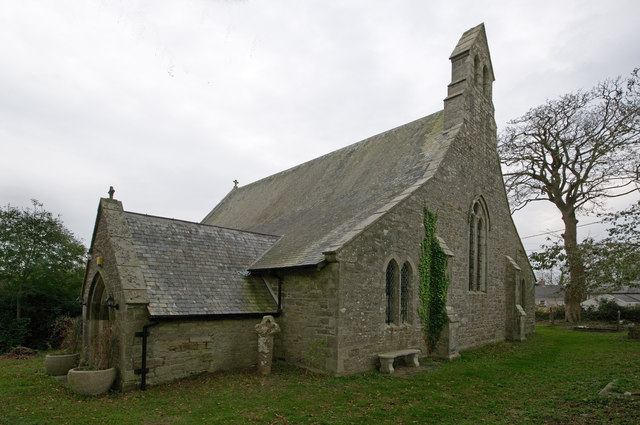
St John's Church, Godolphin Cross

- Berkeley Cottages, Collingwood Road, Stoke Dameral, Plymouth: 1847
- St Illogan's Church, Illogan, Cornwall: 1846
- Old Rectory, Siddington, Gloucestershire: 1847
- Holy Trinity Church, Cerney Wick, Gloucestershire: 1847–48
- Church of St Agnes, St Agnes, Cornwall: 1848
- Old Rectory, Stoke Canon, Devon: 1848–51
- St Paul's Church, Devonport, Devon: 1849; destroyed by enemy action, 1941
- St John the Baptist Church, Godolphin Cross, Cornwall: 1849–51
- St James the Great Church, Keyham, Devon: 1849–51; damaged by enemy action, 1941; demolished 1958

=== 1850s ===
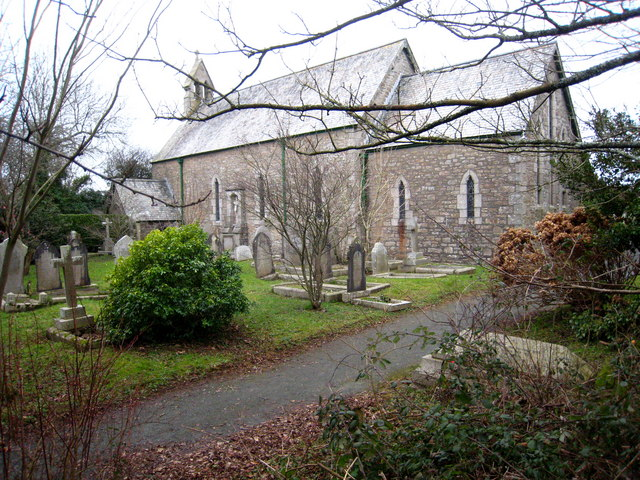
Parish Church of the Holy Trinity Penponds

- St Michael's Mount, Cornwall: addition to South Court, for Sir J St Aubyn, 1850
- St Mary's Church, Devonport, Devon: 1850
- Vicarage, Horsley, Gloucestershire: 1850–52; altered by A W Maberly, 1874
- St Stephen's Church, Devonport, Devon: 1852
- Market House, Devonport, Devon: 1852
- Holy Trinity Church, Penponds, Cornwall: 1854
- St James the Less Church, Plymouth, Devon: 1854–61
- St John's Church, Enfield, Middlesex: 1857
- Christ Church, Latchingdon, Essex: 1857
- Delamore House, Devon: for Admiral George Parker, 1859–60 and 1876

=== 1860s ===
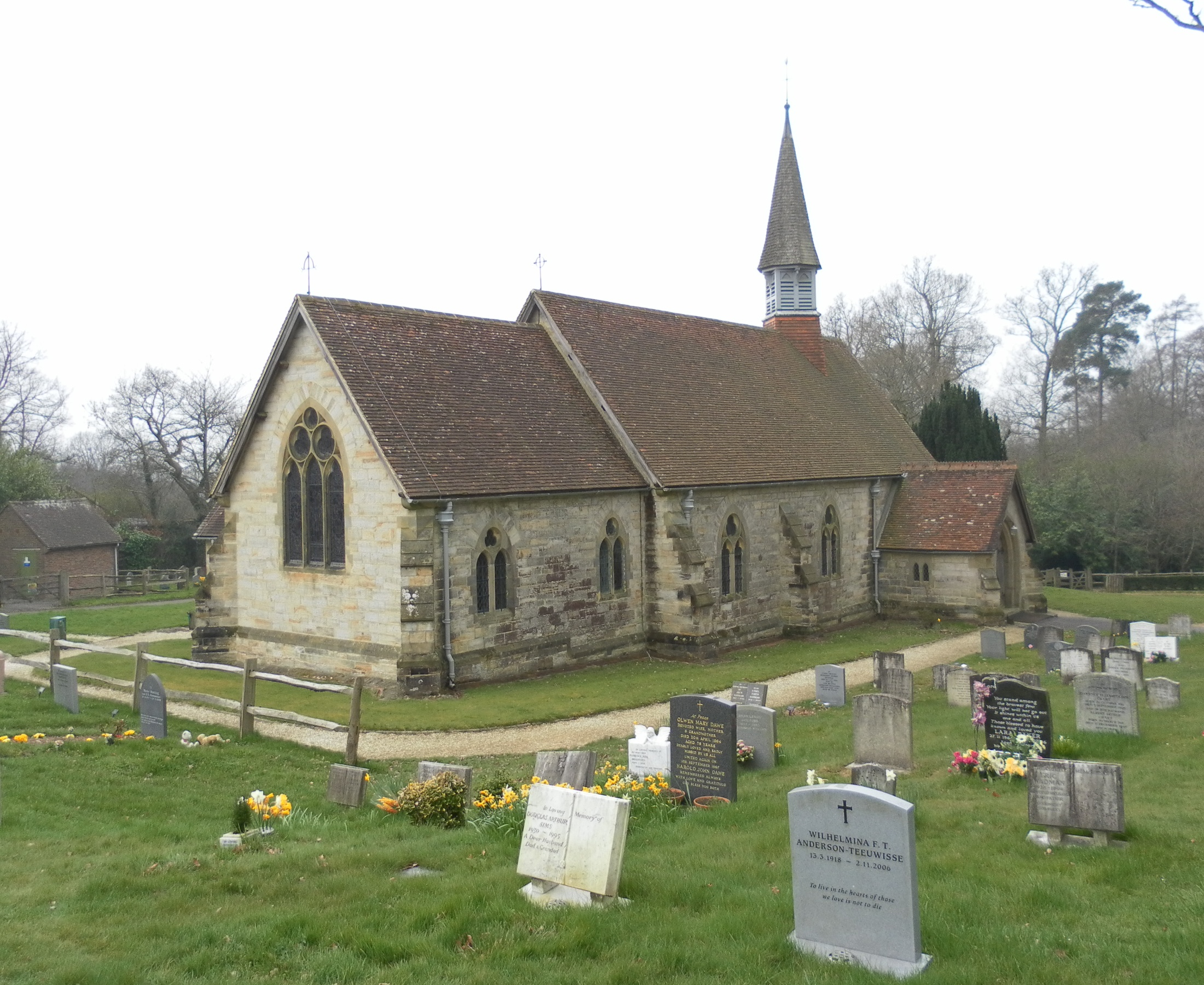
St Bartholomew's Church, Cross-in-Hand

- All Saints Church, Marazion, Cornwall: 1861
- Middle Temple, London: Goldsmith's Building, 1861
- St Martin and St Meriadoc’s Church, Camborne: restoration,1861–62
- Temple Church, London: restoration, 1862
- St Andrew's Church, Thringstone, Leicestershire: 1862
- St Mary's Church, Widford, Essex: 1862
- Church of All Hallows, South Cerney, Gloucestershire: 1862
- Pentre, Pembrokeshire: remodelling for Col A H Saunders-Davies at a cost of £5,000, 1863; mostly demolished; service wing survives
- St Bartholomew's Church, Cross-in-Hand, Sussex: 1863–64; enlarged 1901
- Midelney Place, Somerset: for E B Cely-Trevilian, 1863–66
- Trevince House, Cornwall: rebuilt for Henry Beauchamp Tucker, 1863–66
- Haddington Road Bible Christian Chapel, Devonport, Devon: 1864
- St Mark's Church, Gillingham, Kent: 1864–6
- Berkley Rectory, Berkley Nr Frome, Somerset: extension,1865
- The Abbey, Ditcheat, Somerset: attributed: refronting and internal alterations for Rev William Leir, 1864–68
- St Stephen's Church, Redruth, Cornwall: 1865
- St Peter's Church, Selsey, Sussex: 1865
- Holy Innocents Church, Tuck Hill, Shropshire: 1865
- All Saints Church, Reading, Berkshire: 1865–74
- St John the Evangelist Church, St Ives, Cornwall: 1866
- Holy Trinity, Ashby-de-la-Zouch, Leicestershire: addition of chancel, 1866
- Holy Trinity Church, Barkingside, Middlesex: 1867
- St Clement Church, Kensington, Middlesex: 1867–69
- St Mary, Kilmington, Wiltshire: addition of N aisle and S transept, 1868

=== 1870s ===
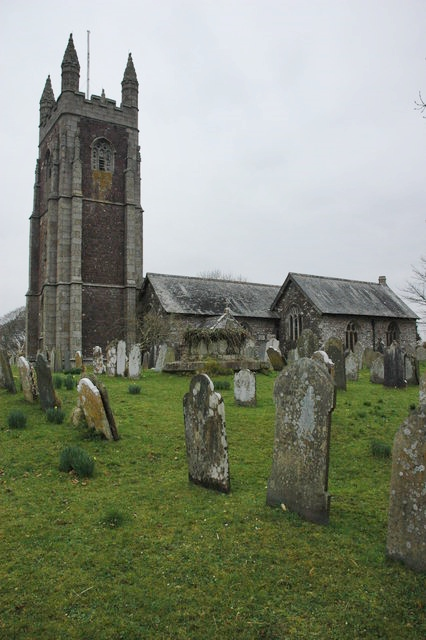
St Mary & St Julian, Maker

- All Saints Church, Harrowbarrow, Cornwall, 1870
- Puddleduck Hall, Hardwicke, Gloucestershire: formerly known as Glebe House, 1870
- St Materiana's Church, Tintagel, Cornwall: 1870
- St Mary the Virgin Church, Tyndalls Park, Bristol: 1870–81, notably similar to All Saints, Reading
- Chapel, Maristow, Devon: 1871
- Greenhurst, Surrey: for Thomas Lambert, 1871–74
- Chalcot House, Dilton Marsh, Wiltshire, alterations and extensions, 1872–76
- Loggia, Mersham-Le-Hatch, Kent: 1872
- St Michael and All Angels Church, Galleywood Common, Essex: 1873
- St Giles' Church, Reading, Berkshire: rebuilding, 1873
- St Mary's and St Julian's Church, Maker, Cornwall: restoration and addition of south aisle, 1873–74
- St Gregory's Church, Dawlish 1873-75 enlargement
- St Michael's Mount, Cornwall: addition of southeast wing for Sir J St Aubyn, 1874–80; further extended c 1930
- St Peter's Church, Belsize Park, Middlesex: addition of chancel and tower, 1875
- St Luke's Church, Southampton, Hampshire: chancel, 1875
- St Giles' Church, Marston Montgomery, Derbyshire: nave, 1875–77
- St Andrew's Church, Ampthill, Bedfordshire: alterations, 1877
- St Peter and St Paul's Church, Clare, Suffolk: 1877–1883
- Vicarage, Clare, Suffolk: 1878
- St Helen's Church, Ashby-de-la-Zouch: rebuilt, 1878
- St Martin and St Meriadoc’s Church, Camborne: enlargement 1878–79
- Truro Cathedral, Truro, Cornwall: surveys of former St Mary’s church and competition designs (unexecuted), 1878–80
- Pentre, Pembrokeshire: private chapel as memorial to A H Saunders-Davies, 1879; the font and pulpit now at Manordeifi church
- Rousham House, Oxfordshire: extension and restoration for Clement Upton-Cottrell-Dormer, 1870s
- St Mawnan and St Stephen's Church, Mawnan restoration 1879–80

=== 1880s ===
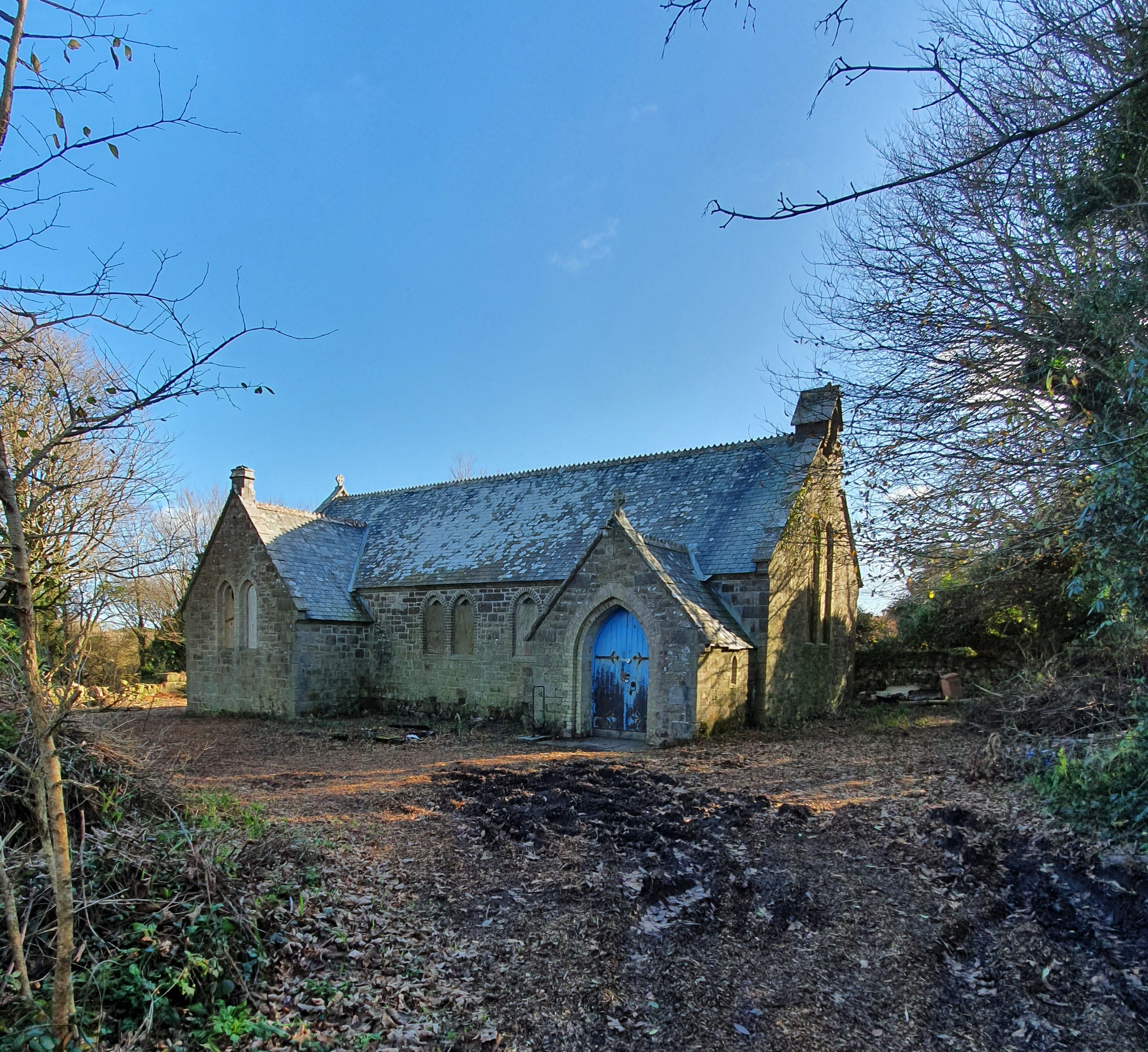
Mission Church of All Saints, Trythall

- Essex Street; no 33, Westminster, Middlesex: 1880, built in imitation of a house of c 1720
- St Peter's Church, Noss Mayo, Devon: 1880–82, as replacement for Revelstoke church
- St John's Church, Penzance 1880-81
- St Andrew's Church, Eakring 1880–1881, restoration
- Church of St Mary the Virgin, Gamlingay, Cambridgeshire, 1880 restoration
- Theological College, Ely, Cambridgeshire: 1881, now part of King's School
- Pencalenick House, Truro, Cornwall: 1881
- St John's Church, Aylesbury, Buckinghamshire: 1881–83
- Middle Temple, London: new chambers on north side of Brick Court, 1882, Tudor; altered c.1950 after bomb damage
- St Luke's Church, Reading, Berkshire: 1882
- Church, St Gluvias, Cornwall: 1882–83
- St Peter's Church, Rose Ash, Devon: 1882–92 (with Wadling)
- Abberley Hall, Worcestershire: alterations and clock tower for John Joseph Jones, c.1883
- Oakhampton House, Worcestershire: remodelling for John Henry Crane, 1883
- Mission Church, Ashton, Cornwall: 1884
- St Michael's Church, Silverstone, Northamptonshire: 1884
- Middle Temple, London: Garden Court, 1884–85, neo-Jacobean
- Church, Gamlingay Heath, Cambridgeshire: 1885
- Mission Church of All Saints, Trythall, Gulval, Cornwall: 1885

=== After 1885, in partnership with Henry J Wadling ===
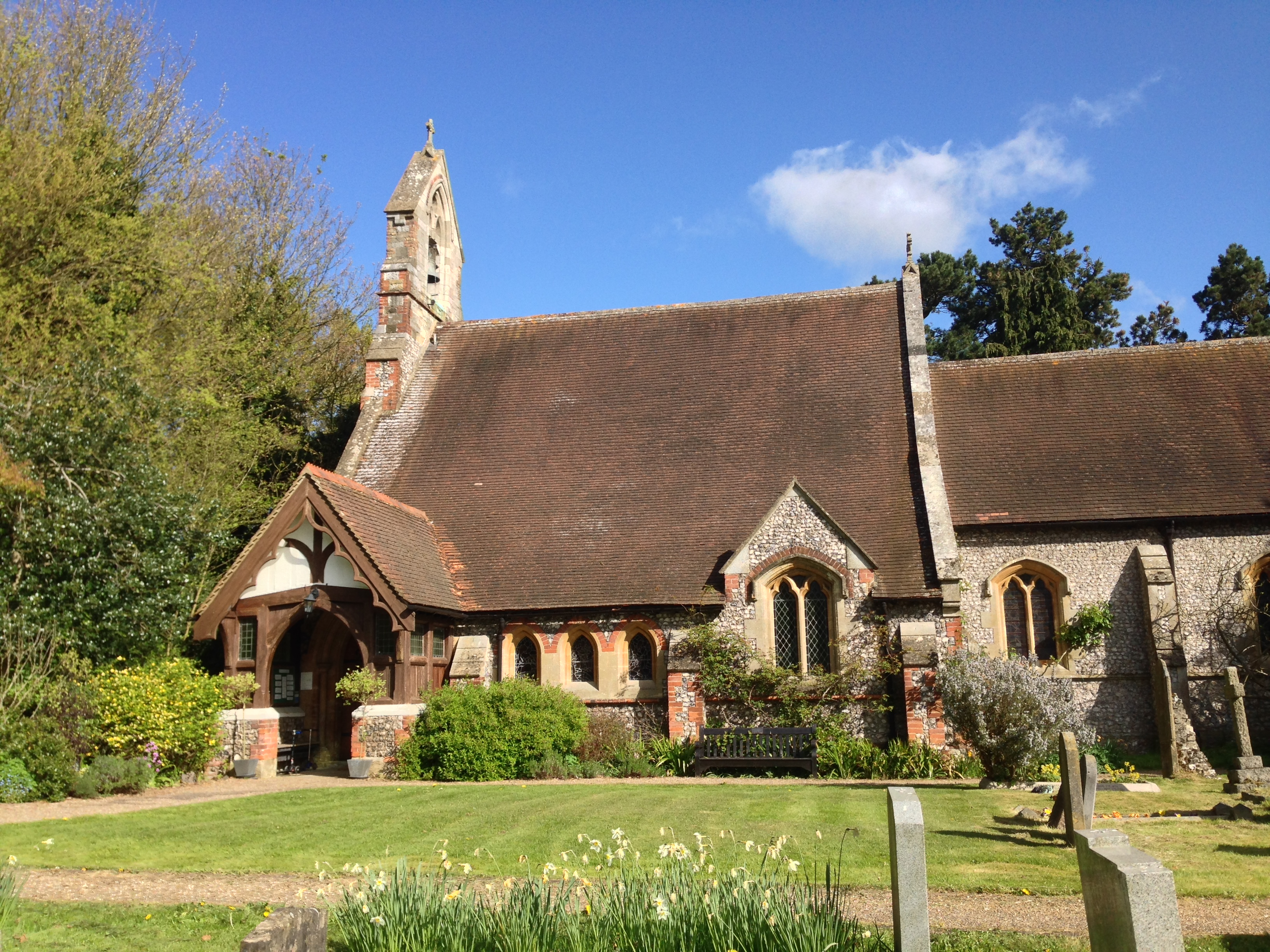
St Margaret's Church, Halstead

- St Sylvester's Church, Tetworth, Huntingdonshire: 1886
- Muntham, Itchingfield, Sussex: for Marquess of Bath, 1887
- St Matthew's Church, Moulmein, Burma: 1887
- St Peter-in-Ely, Ely, Cambridgeshire: 1890
- St Peter's Church, Sheringham, Norfolk: 1895, completed by Henry Wadling after his death
- St Margaret's Church, Halstead, Kent: north aisle and vestry, 1897

=== Date unknown ===
- Anstie House, Cornwall
- St Barnabas's Church, Devonport, Devon

== Church restorations listed by counties chronologically ==
Bedfordshire: Ampthill, 1877

Buckinghamshire: Weston Turville, 1879; Marsh Gibbon, 1879–80; Maids Moreton, 1882–87; Stone, 1883–90

Cambridgeshire: Soham, 1879–80; Gamlingay, 1880–81; Castle Camps, 1882; Little Abington, 1885; Little Gransden, 1885–88; Teversham, 1888–92

Cornwall: Sennen, 1847; St Agnes, 1848; Godolphin, 1849–51; Mawgan-in-Meneage, 1855; Kenwyn, 1860–62; Lesnewth, 1862–65; Lanivet, 1865; Egloshayle, 1867; St Keyne, 1868–77; Minster, 1869–71; Tintagel, 1870; St Anne's Church, Hessenford, 1870–71; St Minver, 1870–75; Tuckingmill, 1875–79; St Breock, 1880–82; St Piran's Church, Perranarworthal, 1884; Ludgvan, 1887–88; Mevagissey, 1887–88; Stratton (1888); Werrington (at the time in Devon), 1891; St Germans, 1891–93; Gulval, 1892; Callington, date unknown; St Issey, date unknown; Mabe date unknown (after 1866). St Aubyn's work always included a footscraper outside the porches: John Betjeman knew this and often failed to visit churches where these could be found.

Derbyshire: Duffield, 1846; St Andrew's Church, Cubley, 1872–74

Devon: Stoke Fleming, 1871; Dawlish, 1874; St. Giles-on-the-Heath, 1878

Gloucestershire: Daglingworth, 1845–51; Church of All Hallows, South Cerney, 1861–62; Standish, 1867; Owlpen, 1874–75; Dursley, 1888–89

Hampshire: Sherborne St John, 1854, 1866–84

Herefordshire: Cusop, date unknown

Kent: Cliffe, 1864; Boughton-under-Blean, 1871; Lympne, 1878–80; Harbledown, 1880; Sheldwich, 1888

Leicestershire: Whitwick, 1848–50; Holy Trinity, Ashby-de-la-Zouch, 1866; Ashby Parva, 1866; Appleby Magna, 1870–72; St Helen, Ashby-de-la-Zouch, 1878–80

Lincolnshire: Theddlethorpe All Saints, 1885

Northamptonshire: Maidwell, 1891

Nottinghamshire: Eakring, 1880–81

Suffolk: Little Glemham, 1857–58; Woolverstone, 1888–89; Sternfield, date unknown

Surrey: Addington, 1876

== Sources ==
- Newman, John (2012) [1969]. Kent: West and the Weald. The Buildings of England. Yale University Press. ISBN 978-0-30-018509-6.
