= Safety fuse =

Type of explosive fuse

The safety fuse is a type of fuse invented and patented by English inventor William Bickford in 1831. Originally it consisted of a "tube" of gunpowder surrounded by a waterproofed varnished jute "rope." It replaced earlier and less reliable methods of igniting gunpowder blasting charges which had caused many injuries and deaths in the mining industry. The safety fuse burns at a rate of typically about 30 seconds per foot (1 second per cm).

== History ==
Documented evidence suggests that the earliest fuses were first used by the Chinese between the 10th and 12th centuries. After the Chinese had invented gunpowder, they began adapting its explosive properties for use in military technology. By 1044 they were using gunpowder in simple grenades, bombs, and flamethrowers. Gunpowder did not reach Europe until the early 13th century, carried over from China by Middle Eastern traders and merchants along the old Silk Road.

For three centuries gunpowder was primarily used for military warfare. It was not until 1574 that gunpowder was first introduced to the mining industry, and it took until 1617 before it was first used in a large-scale mining operation—at Thillot in France.

== Sensitivity of gunpowder ==
One of the problems miners faced when introducing gunpowder into their operations was that it was relatively easy to ignite when exposed to sparks, intense heat, or flames. The method used by miners to blast away rock involved drilling several holes across a rock face which would be filled with charges of gunpowder. In order to confine the gases produced on ignition, the gunpowder was confined within each shot hole by inserting a pointed rod known as a "needle" in the gunpowder-charged hole and then packing in soft clay and tamping it down to form a plug. The "needle" was then removed and replaced by a fuse made of straws or quills filled with black powder. To prevent sparking, a copper needle and a non-metallic ramming rod, typically made from hickory, were used.

If a spark was created, the results could be disastrous to the work force, and this was a common occurrence. Miners and mine owners were aware of the dangers of the use of gunpowder in mining, as is evident in their instructions for handling the material. A mill in England preparing the material wrote in its instructions, "Whosoever is at Labour within or without the powder magazines should execute his commission in such a respectful and revered silence as is seemly in such a place where (unless the Almighty in his Grace keeps a protective hand over the Labour) the least lack of care may not alone cause the loss of life of all present, but may even in a moment transform this place as well as its surroundings into a heap of stone."

The other major problem concerned the intentional ignition of the gunpowder charges. To provide some protection from the blast and the fumes, a nominated miner ignited the far end of the fuse which was intended to burn at a known rate. The miners, therefore, knowing the length of the fuse, could estimate the delay between ignition of the fuse and the ignition of the main charges. However, early fuses, known as filled "quills", had a tendency to either burn irregularly, "flash off", or break—either by separation or by "pinching" in the shot hole due to the tamping process. They could also be damaged allowing moisture in, which could cause them to smoulder instead of burn and introduce a long delay. If the main charge failed to ignite, this was known as a misfire or "hang fire", and the miners would need to wait before returning to the work face to set new fuses. Increasingly, miners in Cornwall in the late 18th and early 19th centuries were becoming badly injured as a result of suspecting that there had been a misfire and returning to the work face just as a smouldering damp quill ignited the gunpowder charges.

== William Bickford ==
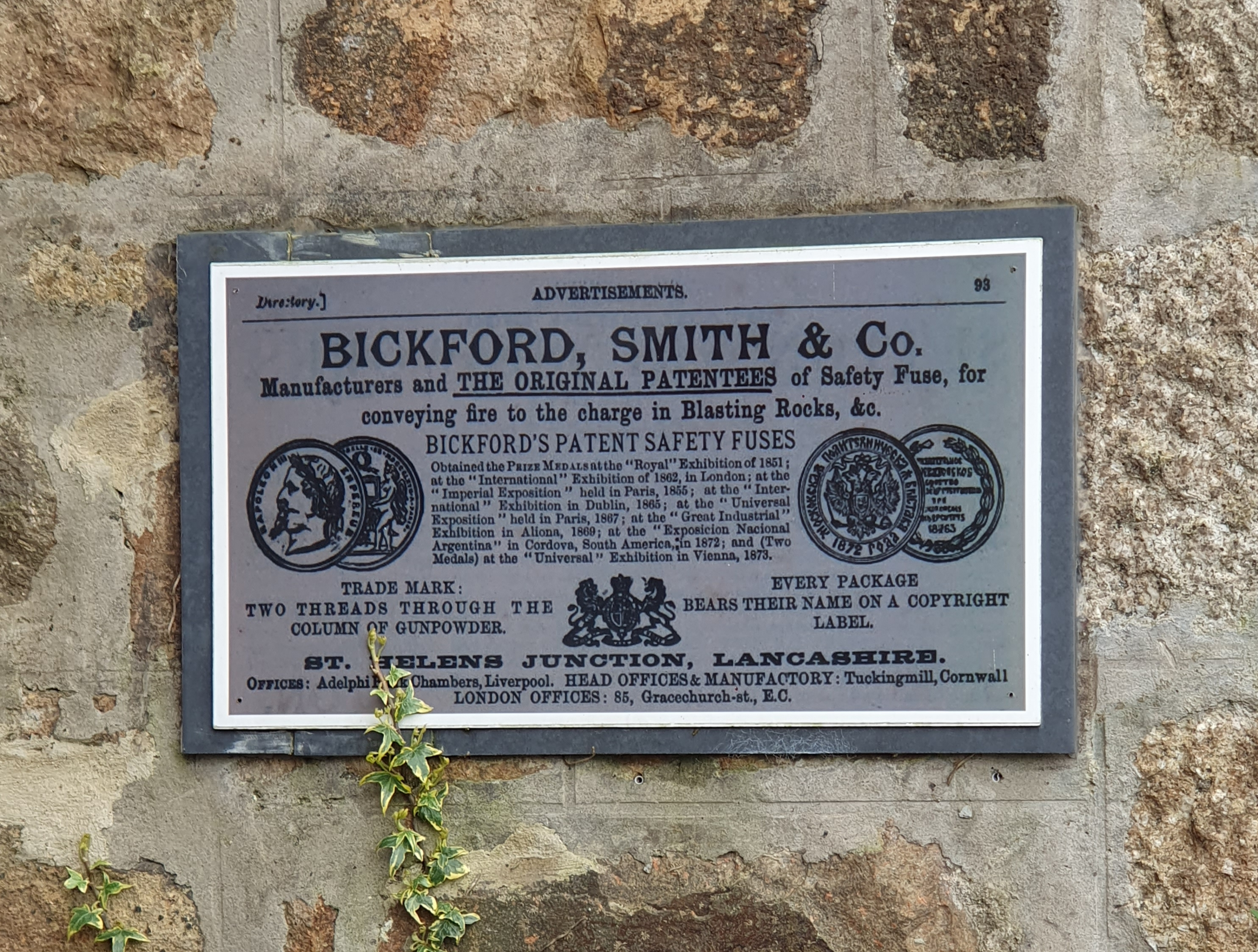
Plaque showing facsimile of one of Bickford's safety fuse advertisements

In 1831 English merchant William Bickford moved to the heart of the Cornish mining district near Camborne; where at Tuckingmill he developed the first practical and reliable means for igniting gunpowder when mining, the "Safety Fuze". After earlier attempts at developing a safer way had failed, Bickford had an insight while visiting his friend who was a ropemaker. While observing his friend winding cord together to generate a rope, Bickford believed he could adapt the same method towards developing a fuse. This was done with the help of his son-in-law George Smith and a working miner named Thomas Davey.

Bickford invented a machine which would thread and weave two layers of jute yarn (a shiny vegetable fibre), spun in opposite directions, over a small "tube" of gunpowder, the whole of which would then be "varnished" with tar to waterproof the product. The outcome was the development of a fuse which when lit "the fire only travels along it slowly, rate of burning ... being about 30 seconds per foot." Bickford had developed a fuse which would burn for a known length of time, depending on the length of the fuse.

Bickford obtained a British Patent for his device (No. 6159 "Safety Fuze for Igniting Gunpowder used in Blasting Rocks, Etc") on 6 September 1831. It was originally called "The Patent Safety Rod" but its name was later changed to the "Safety Fuse". It was supplied as a "rope" of about 0.375 to 0.5 inches (9.5 to 12.7 mm) diameter; and was sold at the time for about same price as its predecessor, quills, at three pence per fathom (6 ft, 1.8 m). Bickford also set up a partnership with Thomas Davey, who gained twenty five percent of the profits for the first fourteen years.

== Impact of the safety fuse ==
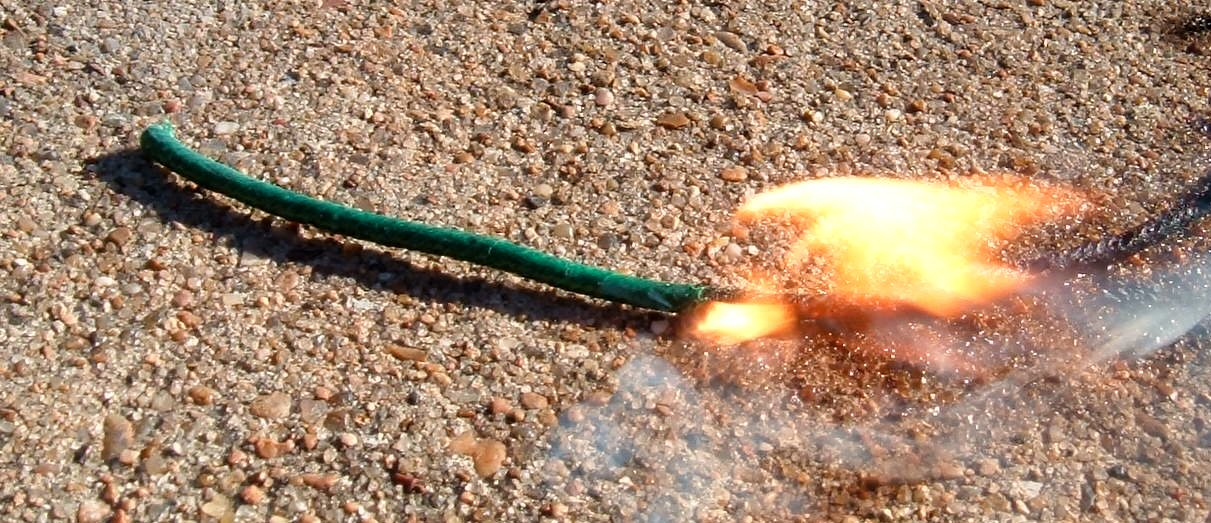
A burning waterproof fuse

Given the unreliability of fuses and means of detonation prior to Bickford's fuse, this new technology changed the safety and conditions of mining. Due to poor record keeping or lack thereof, it is relatively difficult to determine the exact number of mining accidents and related statistics prior to the invention of the safety fuse. However "this fuse soon replaced the less reliable fuses which were made of straws or quills filled with black powder, thus greatly reducing the hazard of accidental explosions in mining or construction." Word of the reliability of Bickford's safety fuse spread, and was soon in large demand across world markets.

Bickford's fuse not only dramatically improved the safety conditions of mines around the world, but also contributed to the development of dynamite. Alfred Nobel created dynamite in 1867, by moulding nitroglycerine and a mud-like compound found near his laboratories called kieselguhr into individual cylinders. At the end of each cylinder, Nobel inserted a blasting cap which could be ignited in one of two ways. First, by inserting a safety fuse into the blasting cap and igniting the fuse. Second, by attaching an electrical wire onto the blasting cap and producing a current which would travel from the source to the blasting cap.

== See also ==
- Plastic igniter cord
