= Eakring =

Village and civil parish in Nottinghamshire, England

Coordinates: 53.1534°N 0.9923°W

- Village and civil parish
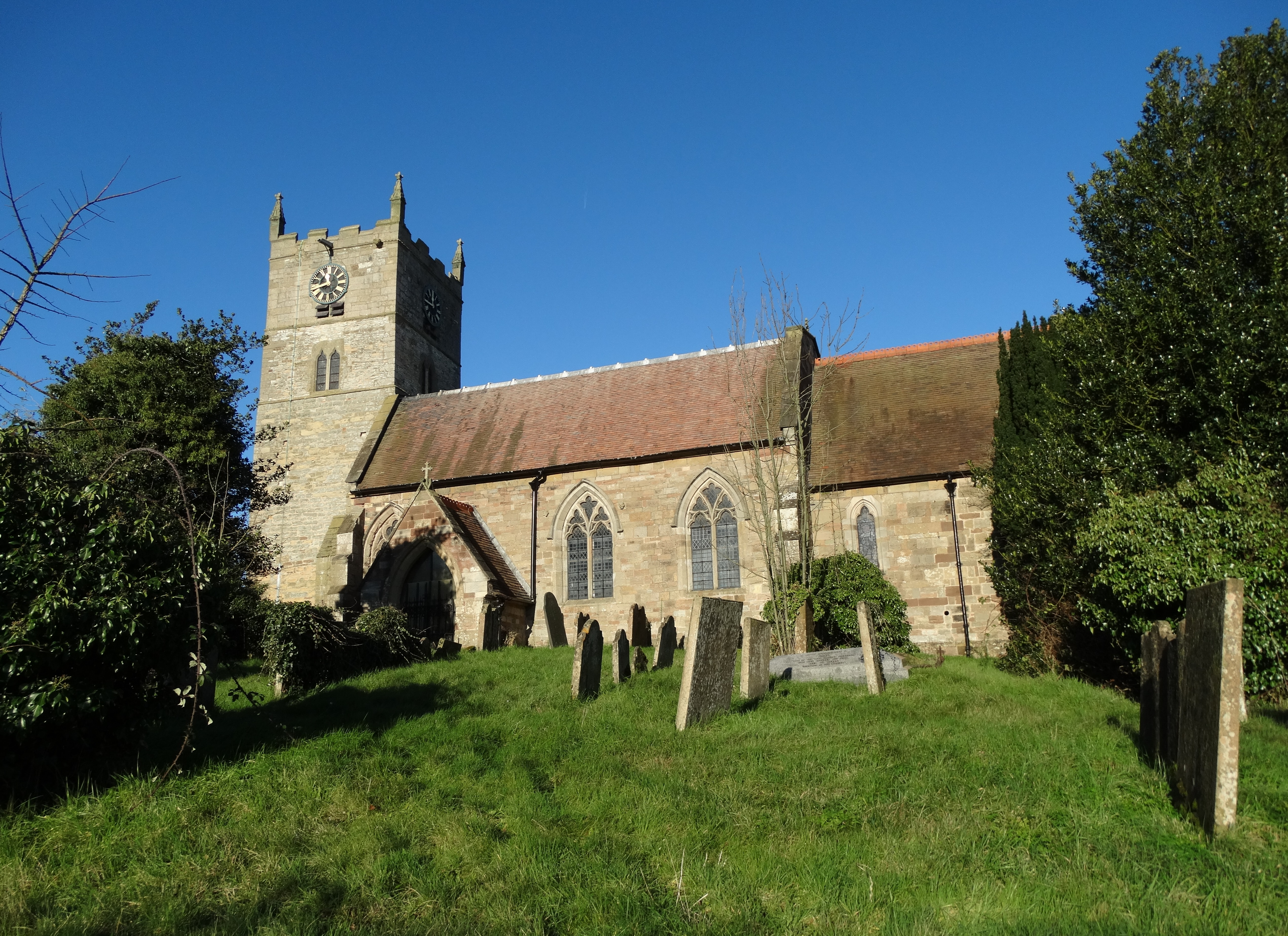
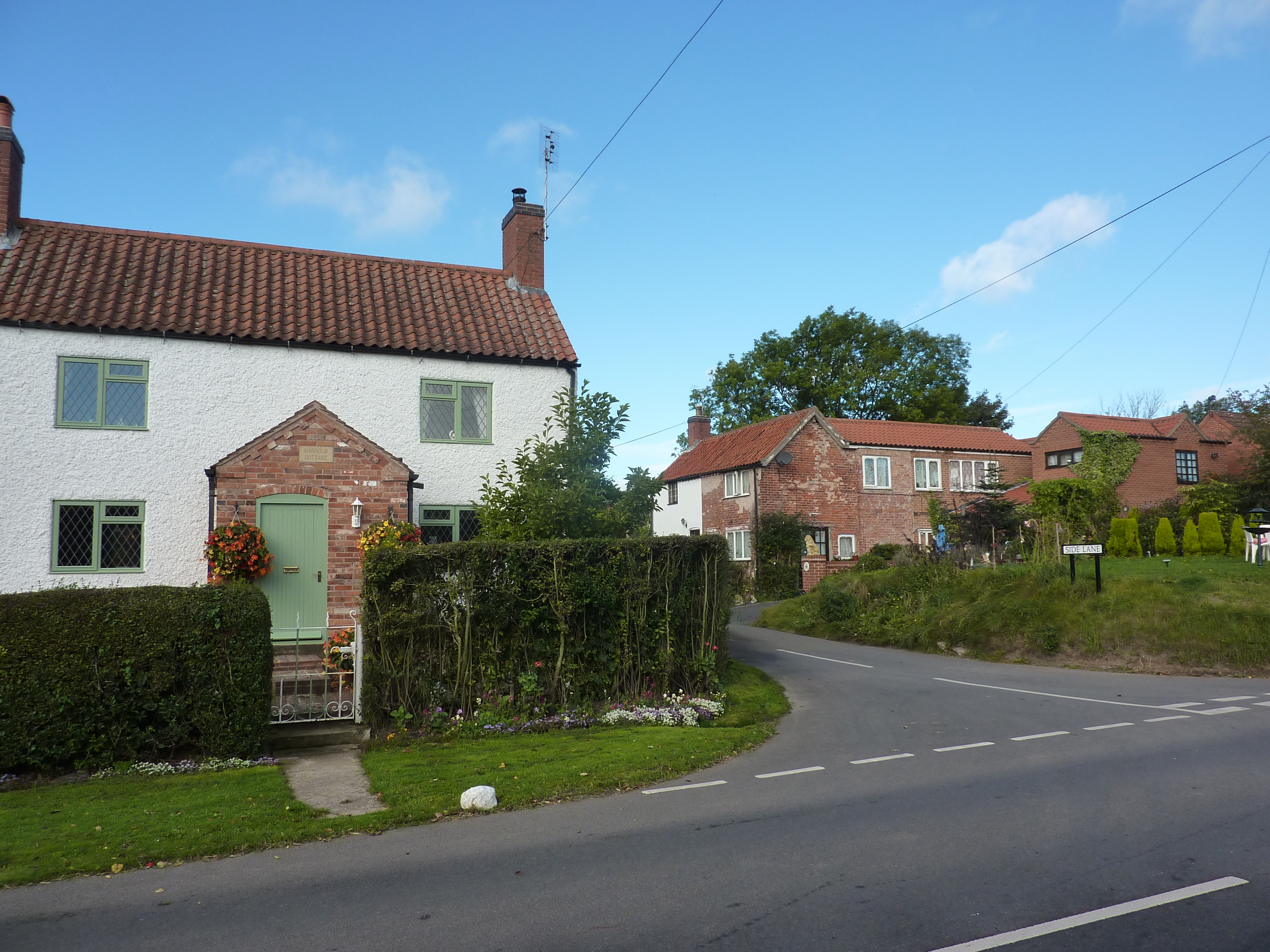
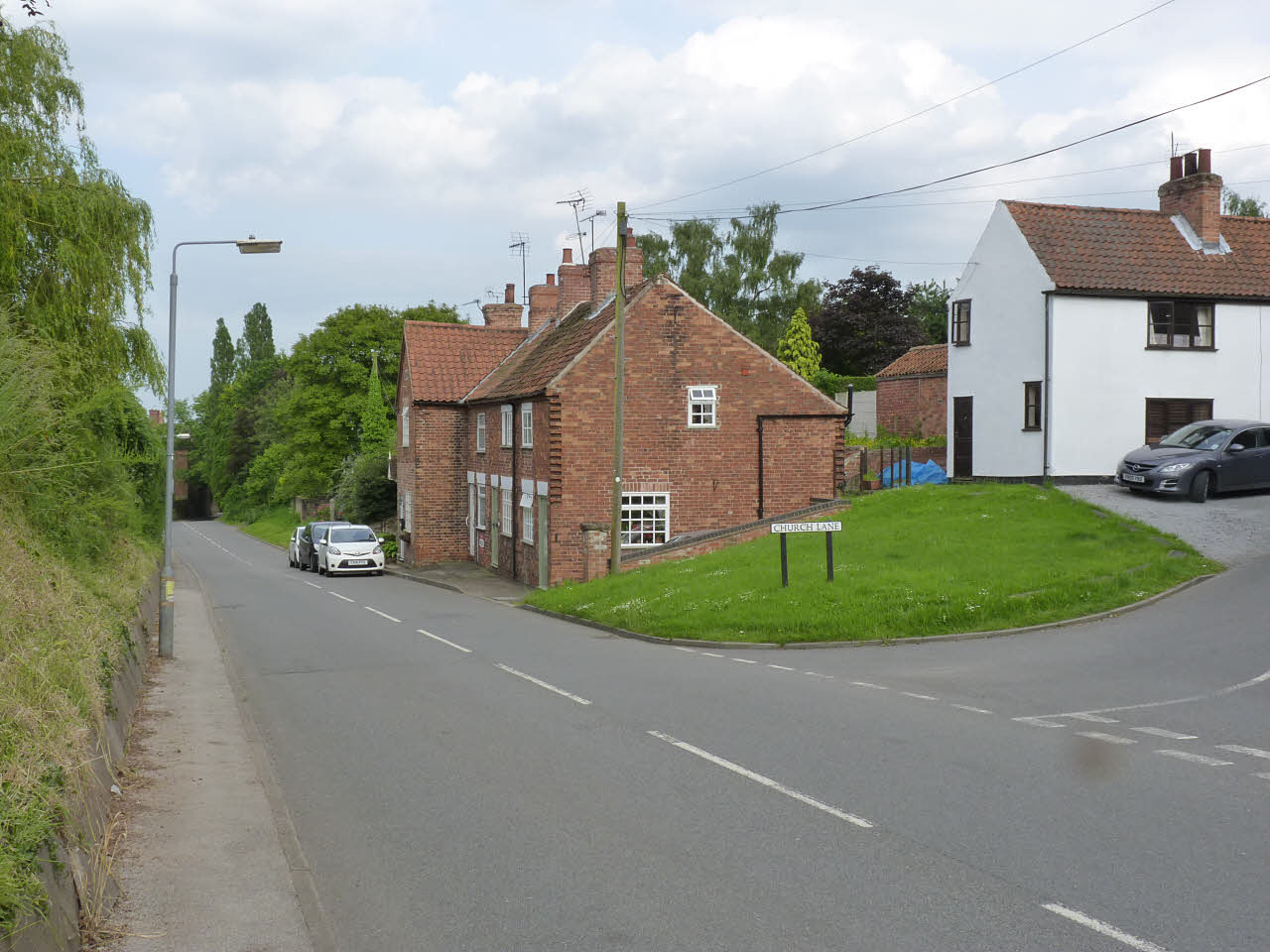
- St Andrew's Church Kirklington Road Main Street

- Location within Nottinghamshire
- Interactive map of Eakring
- Area: 4 sq mi (10 km^{2})
- Population: 440 (2021)
  - Density: 110/sq mi (42/km^{2})
- OS grid reference: SK 673623
  - London: 120 mi (190 km) SSE
- District: Newark and Sherwood
- Shire county: Nottinghamshire
- Region: East Midlands
- Country: England
- Sovereign state: United Kingdom
- Post town: NEWARK
- Postcode district: NG22
- Dialling code: 01623
- Police: Nottinghamshire
- Fire: Nottinghamshire
- Ambulance: East Midlands
- UK Parliament: Sherwood
- Website: www.eakring.org

Eakring is a village and civil parish in the Newark and Sherwood district of Nottinghamshire, England. Its population at the 2011 census was 419, and this increased to 440 residents for the 2021 census. There was sizeable oil production there in the mid-20th century.

The village's name is of Old Norse origin: eik-hringr, which means "the circle of oak trees".

== Geography ==
The village lies between the A617 and the A616 roads between Ollerton and Southwell. Duke's Wood to the south is situated on the top of an escarpment, giving good views over the Trent valley to the east and towards Southwell to the south. Clouds formed by the Cottam Power Station were previously seen on clear days to the northeast. A steep hill descends into the village from the south, on which the road passes a large residential training centre for National Grid plc.

== Heritage ==
The village pub is the Savile Arms in Bilsthorpe Road. The Robin Hood Way, a long-distance footpath that passes through the village, is altogether 168 km (104 miles) long.

Eakring Mill was a five-storey brick tower windmill, built some time after 1840 (grid reference SK673628). The sails were removed in 1912 and the mill was derelict by 1936. It was converted into a house in about 1995. A windmill was shown on a map of 1832, located in Mill Hill Field, where two footpaths cross, (grid reference SK668616) and another windmill shown north of Eakring Brail Wood (grid reference SK662614).

The parish church is dedicated to St Andrew, the Apostle. The grade II* listed building was constructed in the 13th–15th centuries and restored in the early 1880s, when the seating was replaced. It contains a font bearing the date 1674, and a plaque commemorating the installation of the tower clock in 1887.

When Gilbert Michell was Rector in the earlier 18th century, the Tudor parsonage house (now the Old Rectory) was the largest house in the village. It "came with a large tithe barn and other outbuildings, a fold for animals, and a neighbouring orchard and two fish ponds described as 'pleasure grounds' for the house."

== Notable people ==
In birth order:

- Reverend William Mompesson, vicar of Eyam during the Plague in 1666, moved to the village in 1670, lived there for 39 years, and was buried in the churchyard.
- John Michell (1724–1793), Eakring-born cleric and natural philosopher, made notable discoveries in astronomy, geology, optics and gravitation.
- Helen Cresswell (1934–2005), a prolific writer for children, died at her home in Eakring on 26 September 2005.

== World War II oil ==
=== Geological survey ===
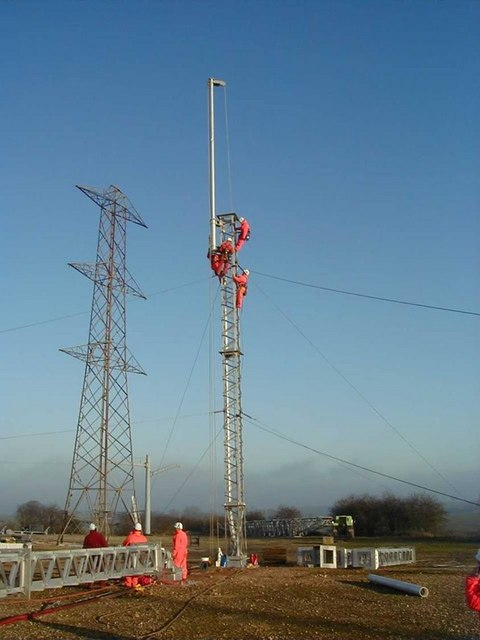
Building pylons at Eakring Academy with National Grid plc in March 2004

In the late 1930s oil exploration was undertaken by the D'Arcy Exploration Co Ltd, part of the Anglo-Iranian Oil Company. Using geological data from colliery workings, geologists calculated that an anticline was situated under Eakring. A nearby borehole at Kelham had produced oil. Drilling to levels between 7,463 and 7,468 feet (2,275 and 2,276 m) had found significant quantities of oil – which turned out to be particularly significant when the Second World War and the U-Boat campaign started.

=== Drilling ===
Wells produced oil at Caunton and Kelham Hills. Their specific gravity of 0.86 qualified them to be high-grade oil. The UK typically had oil reserves of 5 million barrels (790,000 m^{3}), which were under strength.

In March 1943, production began at around 100 wells, coordinated by Philip Southwell, a petroleum engineer from the D'Arcy Exploration Company (now BP), who had liaised with Lloyd Noble, president of Noble Drilling Corporation in Oklahoma, United States. During the war, the oilfield produced over 2.25 million barrels (358,000 m^{3}) or perhaps 3.5 million barrels (560,000 m^{3}) of oil from 170 pumps ("nodding donkeys"). Production continued until 1964 and the wells produced 47 million barrels (7,500,000 m^{3}).

The location of the wells was kept secret throughout the operation. American oil workers lived at the Anglican theological college at Kelham Hall.

== See also ==
- Listed buildings in Eakring
