= Roseworthy, Cornwall =

Hamlet in Cornwall, England

Coordinates: 50.2082°N 5.3451°W

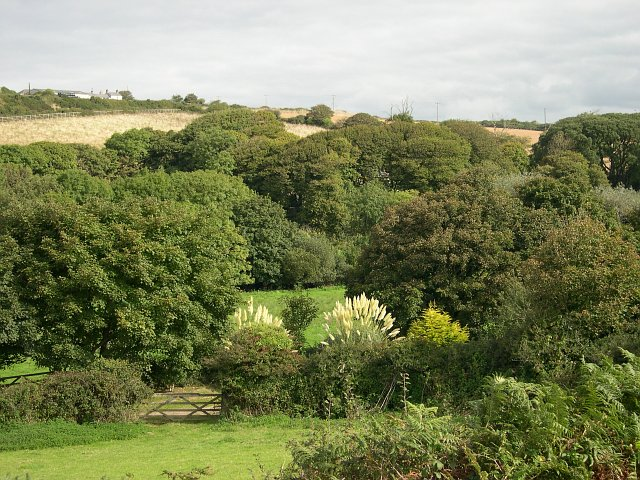
The Roseworthy Valley

Roseworthy (Cornish: Rosworghi) is a hamlet on the A30 trunk road in the parish of Gwinear-Gwithian in Cornwall, England, UK.

Roseworthy Barton is a farm half a mile south of Roseworthy.

At Roseworthy there was once a holy well and chapel of Saint Winierus, which was also the site of the most splendid Celtic cross of Cornwall (now at Lanherne).
