= List of United Kingdom locations: Pe-Pen =

The United Kingdom

This is part of the list of United Kingdom locations: a gazetteer of place names in the United Kingdom showing each place's locality and geographical coordinates.

== Pe ==
=== Pea ===
Location	Locality	Coordinates (links to map & photo sources)	OS grid reference
Peacehaven	East Sussex	50.79°N 00.00°E	TQ4101
Peacehaven Heights	East Sussex	50.78°N 00.01°E	TQ4200
Peacemarsh	Dorset	51.04°N 02.28°W	ST8027
Peak Dale	Derbyshire	53.28°N 01.86°W	SK0976
Peak Forest	Derbyshire	53.30°N 01.83°W	SK1179
Peak Hill	Lincolnshire	52.72°N 00.13°W	TF2616
Peakirk	Cambridgeshire	52.63°N 00.28°W	TF1606
Pean Hill	Kent	51.31°N 01.01°E	TR1062
Pear Ash	Somerset	51.07°N 02.35°W	ST7531
Pearson's Green	Kent	51.16°N 00.41°E	TQ6943
Peartree	Hertfordshire	51.79°N 00.20°W	TL2412
Pear Tree	City of Derby	52.89°N 01.48°W	SK3533
Peartree Green	Essex	51.65°N 00.29°E	TQ5998
Peartree Green	Herefordshire	51.98°N 02.59°W	SO5932
Peartree Green	City of Southampton	50.89°N 01.38°W	SU4311
Peartree Green	Surrey	51.12°N 00.58°W	SU9937
Peas Acre	Bradford	53.86°N 01.84°W	SE1041
Peasedown St John	Bath and North East Somerset	51.31°N 02.43°W	ST7057
Peasehill	Derbyshire	53.03°N 01.40°W	SK4049
Peaseland Green	Norfolk	52.70°N 01.03°E	TG0516
Peasemore	Berkshire	51.49°N 01.35°W	SU4577
Peasenhall	Suffolk	52.26°N 01.44°E	TM3569
Pease Pottage	West Sussex	51.07°N 00.21°W	TQ2532
Peas Hill	Cambridgeshire	52.55°N 00.06°E	TL4097
Peaslake	Surrey	51.18°N 00.45°W	TQ0844
Peasley Cross	St Helens	53.43°N 02.72°W	SJ5293
Peasmarsh	East Sussex	50.97°N 00.66°E	TQ8723
Peasmarsh	Somerset	50.90°N 02.94°W	ST3412
Peasmarsh	Surrey	51.20°N 00.58°W	SU9946
Peathill	Aberdeenshire	57.68°N 02.11°W	NJ9366
Peat Inn	Fife	56.27°N 02.88°W	NO4509
Peatling Magna	Leicestershire	52.52°N 01.13°W	SP5992
Peatling Parva	Leicestershire	52.49°N 01.14°W	SP5889
Peaton	Shropshire	52.45°N 02.69°W	SO5384
Peatonstrand	Shropshire	52.45°N 02.69°W	SO5384

=== Peb ===
Location	Locality	Coordinates (links to map & photo sources)	OS grid reference
Pebmarsh	Essex	51.96°N 00.69°E	TL8533
Pebsham	East Sussex	50.84°N 00.49°E	TQ7608
Pebworth	Worcestershire	52.11°N 01.81°W	SP1346

=== Pec ===
Location	Locality	Coordinates (links to map & photo sources)	OS grid reference
Pecket Well	Calderdale	53.75°N 02.01°W	SD9929
Peckforton	Cheshire	53.09°N 02.70°W	SJ5356
Peckham	Southwark	51.46°N 00.07°W	TQ3476
Peckham Bush	Kent	51.21°N 00.37°E	TQ6649
Peckingell	Wiltshire	51.46°N 02.10°W	ST9374
Pecking Mill	Somerset	51.13°N 02.53°W	ST6337
Peckleton	Leicestershire	52.59°N 01.32°W	SK4600

=== Ped ===
Location	Locality	Coordinates (links to map & photo sources)	OS grid reference
Pedair-ffordd	Powys	52.80°N 03.32°W	SJ1124
Pedham	Norfolk	52.65°N 01.44°E	TG3312
Pedlars End	Essex	51.73°N 00.21°E	TL5306
Pedlar's Rest	Shropshire	52.45°N 02.76°W	SO4884
Pedlinge	Kent	51.07°N 01.03°E	TR1335
Pedmore	Dudley	52.43°N 02.13°W	SO9182
Pednor Bottom	Buckinghamshire	51.71°N 00.65°W	SP9303
Pednormead End	Buckinghamshire	51.69°N 00.62°W	SP9501
Pedwell	Somerset	51.12°N 02.83°W	ST4236

=== Pee ===
Location	Locality	Coordinates (links to map & photo sources)	OS grid reference
Peebles	Scottish Borders	55.64°N 03.19°W	NT2540
Peel	Lancashire	53.77°N 02.98°W	SD3531
Peel	Scottish Borders	55.60°N 02.90°W	NT4335
Peel Common	Hampshire	50.81°N 01.19°W	SU5702
Peel Green	Salford	53.46°N 02.39°W	SJ7497
Peel Hall	Manchester	53.37°N 02.25°W	SJ8387
Peel Hill	Lancashire	53.78°N 02.98°W	SD3533
Peel Park	South Lanarkshire	55.75°N 04.23°W	NS6054
Peene	Kent	51.09°N 01.11°E	TR1837
Peening Quarter	Kent	51.02°N 00.67°E	TQ8828

=== Peg ===
Location	Locality	Coordinates (links to map & photo sources)	OS grid reference
Peggs Green	Leicestershire	52.74°N 01.39°W	SK4117
Pegsdon	Bedfordshire	51.95°N 00.37°W	TL1230
Pegswood	Northumberland	55.17°N 01.65°W	NZ2287
Pegwell	Kent	51.32°N 01.38°E	TR3664

=== Pei ===
Location	Locality	Coordinates (links to map & photo sources)	OS grid reference
Peinaha	Highland	57.53°N 06.31°W	NG4258
Peinchorran / Peinachorrain	Highland	57.32°N 06.12°W	NG5233
Peiness	Highland	57.43°N 06.30°W	NG4246
Peinlich	Highland	57.53°N 06.32°W	NG4158
Peinmore (Snizort)	Highland	57.44°N 06.30°W	NG4248
Peinmore (Portree)	Highland	57.38°N 06.19°W	NG4840

=== Pel ===
Location	Locality	Coordinates (links to map & photo sources)	OS grid reference
Pelaw	Gateshead	54.95°N 01.56°W	NZ2862
Pelcomb	Pembrokeshire	51.82°N 05.01°W	SM9218
Pelcomb Bridge	Pembrokeshire	51.81°N 05.00°W	SM9317
Pelcomb Cross	Pembrokeshire	51.81°N 05.03°W	SM9117
Peldon	Essex	51.80°N 00.87°E	TL9816
Pelhamfield	Isle of Wight	50.72°N 01.17°W	SZ5892
Pell Green	East Sussex	51.06°N 00.33°E	TQ6432
Pellon	Calderdale	53.72°N 01.89°W	SE0725
Pelsall	Walsall	52.62°N 01.97°W	SK0203
Pelsall Wood	Walsall	52.62°N 01.98°W	SK0103
Pelton	County Durham	54.87°N 01.61°W	NZ2553
Pelton Fell	County Durham	54.85°N 01.61°W	NZ2551
Pelutho	Cumbria	54.82°N 03.37°W	NY1249
Pelynt	Cornwall	50.36°N 04.53°W	SX2055

=== Pem ===
Location	Locality	Coordinates (links to map & photo sources)	OS grid reference
Pemberton	Carmarthenshire	51.67°N 04.12°W	SN5300
Pemberton	Wigan	53.53°N 02.68°W	SD5504
Pembles Cross	Kent	51.19°N 00.68°E	TQ8847
Pembrey	Carmarthenshire	51.68°N 04.28°W	SN4201
Pembridge	Herefordshire	52.21°N 02.89°W	SO3958
Pembroke (Penfro)	Pembrokeshire	51.67°N 04.92°W	SM9801
Pembroke Dock (Doc Penfro)	Pembrokeshire	51.68°N 04.95°W	SM9603
Pembroke Ferry	Pembrokeshire	51.69°N 04.93°W	SM9704
Pembury	Kent	51.13°N 00.31°E	TQ6240
Pempwell	Cornwall	50.55°N 04.30°W	SX3775

=== Pen ===
==== Pena-Peng ====
Location	Locality	Coordinates (links to map & photo sources)	OS grid reference
Penallt	Monmouthshire	51.78°N 02.69°W	SO5210
Pen-allt	Herefordshire	51.96°N 02.63°W	SO5729
Penally	Pembrokeshire	51.65°N 04.73°W	SS1199
Penalun	Pembrokeshire	51.65°N 04.73°W	SS1199
Penare	Cornwall	50.22°N 04.81°W	SW9940
Penarlâg (Hawarden)	Flintshire	53.17°N 03.03°W	SJ3165
Penarron	Powys	52.48°N 03.28°W	SO1388
Penarth	The Vale Of Glamorgan	51.43°N 03.18°W	ST1871
Penbeagle	Cornwall	50.19°N 05.50°W	SW5039
Pen-bedw	Pembrokeshire	52.02°N 04.62°W	SN2039
Penbedw	Flintshire	53.20°N 03.25°W	SJ1668
Penberth	Cornwall	50.04°N 05.63°W	SW4022
Penbidwal	Monmouthshire	51.89°N 02.97°W	SO3322
Penbodlas	Gwynedd	52.86°N 04.55°W	SH2833
Pen-bont Rhydybeddau	Ceredigion	52.42°N 03.95°W	SN6783
Penboyr	Carmarthenshire	51.99°N 04.40°W	SN3536
Pen Brush	Pembrokeshire	52.01°N 05.09°W	SM880397
Penbryn	Ceredigion	52.14°N 04.50°W	SN2952
Penbwchdy	Pembrokeshire	51.99°N 05.09°W	SM874373
Pencader	Carmarthenshire	52.00°N 04.27°W	SN4436
Pencaenewydd	Gwynedd	52.93°N 04.38°W	SH4040
Pencaerau	Neath Port Talbot	51.63°N 03.82°W	SS7495
Pen-caer-fenny	Swansea	51.63°N 04.14°W	SS5295
Pencaitland	East Lothian	55.90°N 02.89°W	NT4468
Pencarnisiog	Isle of Anglesey	53.22°N 04.47°W	SH3573
Pencarreg	Carmarthenshire	52.08°N 04.14°W	SN5345
Pencarrow	Cornwall	50.60°N 04.68°W	SX1082
Penceiliogi	Carmarthenshire	51.67°N 04.12°W	SN5300
Pencelli	Powys	51.91°N 03.32°W	SO0925
Penclawdd	Swansea	51.63°N 04.11°W	SS5495
Penclegyr	Pembrokeshire	51.95°N 05.20°W	SM803327
Pencoed	Bridgend	51.51°N 03.51°W	SS9581
Pencombe	Herefordshire	52.16°N 02.60°W	SO5952
Pen-common	Neath Port Talbot	51.76°N 03.59°W	SN9008
Pencoys	Cornwall	50.19°N 05.25°W	SW6838
Pencraig	Herefordshire	51.87°N 02.64°W	SO5620
Pencraig	Isle of Anglesey	53.24°N 04.30°W	SH4675
Pencraig	Powys	52.83°N 03.42°W	SJ0427
Pencroesoped	Monmouthshire	51.75°N 03.00°W	SO3107
Pencuke	Cornwall	50.71°N 04.60°W	SX1694
Pendas Fields / Penda's Fields	Leeds	53.81°N 01.43°W	SE3735
Pendeen	Cornwall	50.14°N 05.66°W	SW3834
Pendeen Watch	Cornwall	50.16°N 05.66°W	SW382357
Pendeford	Wolverhampton	52.61°N 02.16°W	SJ8902
Penderyn	Rhondda, Cynon, Taff	51.76°N 03.53°W	SN9408
Pendine	Carmarthenshire	51.74°N 04.56°W	SN2308
Pendlebury	Salford	53.50°N 02.33°W	SD7801
Pendleton	Lancashire	53.84°N 02.38°W	SD7539
Pendleton	Salford	53.48°N 02.28°W	SJ8199
Pendock	Worcestershire	51.98°N 02.32°W	SO7832
Pendoggett	Cornwall	50.57°N 04.79°W	SX0279
Pendomer	Somerset	50.88°N 02.68°W	ST5210
Pendoylan	The Vale Of Glamorgan	51.47°N 03.35°W	ST0676
Pendre	Bridgend	51.51°N 03.58°W	SS9081
Pendre	Gwynedd	52.57°N 04.08°W	SH5900
Pendre	Powys	51.95°N 03.39°W	SO0429
Pendrift	Cornwall	50.53°N 04.68°W	SX1074
Penegoes	Powys	52.58°N 03.81°W	SH7700
Penelewey	Cornwall	50.21°N 05.07°W	SW8140
Penenden Heath	Kent	51.28°N 00.52°E	TQ7657
Penffordd	Pembrokeshire	51.86°N 04.80°W	SN0722
Pen-ffordd-llan	Flintshire	53.28°N 03.30°W	SJ1377
Penfro	Pembrokeshire	51.67°N 04.92°W	SM9801
Pengam	Caerphilly	51.66°N 03.23°W	ST1597
Penge	Croydon	51.41°N 00.07°W	TQ3470
Pengegon	Cornwall	50.20°N 05.28°W	SW6639
Pengelly	Cornwall	50.61°N 04.72°W	SX0783
Pengenffordd	Powys	51.96°N 03.20°W	SO1730
Pengersick	Cornwall	50.10°N 05.38°W	SW5828
Pen-gilfach	Gwynedd	53.12°N 04.15°W	SH5661
Pengold	Cornwall	50.71°N 04.65°W	SX1394
Pengorffwysfa	Isle of Anglesey	53.40°N 04.31°W	SH4692
Pengover Green	Cornwall	50.45°N 04.43°W	SX2765
Penguithal	Herefordshire	51.87°N 02.72°W	SO5020
Pengwern	Denbighshire	53.27°N 03.48°W	SJ0176

==== Penh-Penm ====
Location	Locality	Coordinates (links to map & photo sources)	OS grid reference
Penhale (St Enoder)	Cornwall	50.37°N 04.95°W	SW9057
Penhale (Mullion)	Cornwall	50.01°N 05.22°W	SW6918
Penhale Jakes	Cornwall	50.10°N 05.35°W	SW6028
Penhale Point	Cornwall	50.38°N 05.14°W	SW762587
Penhallick (Carn Brea)	Cornwall	50.21°N 05.26°W	SW6740
Penhallick	Cornwall	50.02°N 05.12°W	SW7618
Penhallow	Cornwall	50.31°N 05.14°W	SW7651
Penhalurick	Cornwall	50.19°N 05.22°W	SW7038
Penhalvean	Cornwall	50.18°N 05.20°W	SW7137
Penhelig	Gwynedd	52.54°N 04.03°W	SN6296
Penhill	Bexley	51.442°N 00.118°E	TQ473736
Penhill	Devon	51.07°N 04.11°W	SS5233
Penhill	Swindon	51.59°N 01.78°W	SU1588
Penhow	City of Newport	51.60°N 02.83°W	ST4290
Penhurst	East Sussex	50.91°N 00.40°E	TQ6916
Penicuik	Midlothian	55.82°N 03.23°W	NT2360
Peniel	Carmarthenshire	51.89°N 04.28°W	SN4324
Peniel	Denbighshire	53.14°N 03.45°W	SJ0362
Penifiler	Highland	57.39°N 06.19°W	NG4841
Peninver	Argyll and Bute	55.45°N 05.56°W	NR7524
Penisa'r Waun	Gwynedd	53.14°N 04.16°W	SH5563
Penistone	Barnsley	53.52°N 01.63°W	SE2403
Penketh	Cheshire	53.37°N 02.66°W	SJ5687
Penkhull	City of Stoke-on-Trent	52.99°N 02.21°W	SJ8644
Penknap	Wiltshire	51.24°N 02.21°W	ST8549
Penkridge	Staffordshire	52.71°N 02.11°W	SJ9213
Penlan	Swansea	51.64°N 03.96°W	SS6496
Pen-Lan-mabws	Pembrokeshire	51.91°N 05.08°W	SM8829
Penleigh	Wiltshire	51.25°N 02.21°W	ST854507
Penley	Shropshire	52.94°N 02.87°W	SJ4139
Penley	Wrexham	52.95°N 02.87°W	SJ4140
Penllech	Gwynedd	52.87°N 04.64°W	SH2234
Penllergaer	Swansea	51.66°N 04.01°W	SS6198
Penllwyn	Caerphilly	51.64°N 03.20°W	ST1795
Penllyn	The Vale Of Glamorgan	51.47°N 03.48°W	SS9776
Pen-llyn	Isle of Anglesey	53.30°N 04.47°W	SH3582
Pen-lon	Isle of Anglesey	53.15°N 04.36°W	SH4264
Penmachno	Conwy	53.03°N 03.80°W	SH7950
Penmaen (or Penmain)	Caerphilly	51.66°N 03.18°W	ST1897
Penmaen	Swansea	51.57°N 04.12°W	SS5388
Penmaenan	Conwy	53.25°N 03.93°W	SH7175
Penmaenmawr	Conwy	53.26°N 03.93°W	SH7176
Penmaenpool	Gwynedd	52.74°N 03.94°W	SH6918
Penmaen Rhôs	Conwy	53.28°N 03.69°W	SH8778
Penmark	The Vale Of Glamorgan	51.40°N 03.36°W	ST0568
Penmarth	Cornwall	50.17°N 05.22°W	SW7035
Penmayne	Cornwall	50.54°N 04.90°W	SW9476
Pen Mill	Somerset	50.94°N 02.62°W	ST5616
Penmon	Isle of Anglesey	53.29°N 04.05°W	SH6380
Penmorfa	Ceredigion	52.14°N 04.48°W	SN3052
Penmorfa	Gwynedd	52.93°N 04.17°W	SH5440
Penmynydd	Isle of Anglesey	53.24°N 04.24°W	SH5074

==== Penn ====
Location	Locality	Coordinates (links to map & photo sources)	OS grid reference
Penn	Buckinghamshire	51.62°N 00.68°W	SU9193
Penn	Dorset	50.75°N 02.93°W	SY3495
Penn	Wolverhampton	52.56°N 02.16°W	SO8996
Pennal	Gwynedd	52.58°N 03.93°W	SH6900
Pennan	Aberdeenshire	57.67°N 02.26°W	NJ8465
Pennance	Cornwall	50.21°N 05.21°W	SW7140
Pennant	Ceredigion	52.24°N 04.18°W	SN5163
Pennant	Conwy	53.11°N 03.68°W	SH8759
Pennant	Powys	52.55°N 03.66°W	SN8797
Pennar	Pembrokeshire	51.67°N 04.96°W	SM9502
Pennard	Swansea	51.57°N 04.07°W	SS5688
Pennar Park	Pembrokeshire	51.67°N 04.98°W	SM9402
Penn Bottom	Buckinghamshire	51.63°N 00.67°W	SU9294
Pennerley	Shropshire	52.58°N 02.96°W	SO3599
Pennington	Cumbria	54.18°N 03.13°W	SD2677
Pennington	Hampshire	50.74°N 01.56°W	SZ3194
Pennington	Wigan	53.48°N 02.52°W	SJ6599
Pennington Green	Wigan	53.54°N 02.59°W	SD6106
Pennorth	Powys	51.92°N 03.29°W	SO1126
Penn Street	Buckinghamshire	51.65°N 00.67°W	SU9296
Pennsylvania	Devon	50.73°N 03.53°W	SX9294
Pennsylvania	South Gloucestershire	51.45°N 02.37°W	ST7473
Penny Bridge	Cumbria	54.23°N 03.06°W	SD3183
Pennycross	Devon	50.39°N 04.15°W	SX4757
Pennygate	Norfolk	52.74°N 01.46°E	TG3422
Penny Green	Derbyshire	53.26°N 01.19°W	SK5475
Penny Hill	Calderdale	53.65°N 01.91°W	SE0618
Penny Hill	Lincolnshire	52.81°N -00.00°E	TF3526
Pennylands	Lancashire	53.54°N 02.80°W	SD4706
Pennymoor	Devon	50.88°N 03.62°W	SS8611
Pennypot	Kent	51.06°N 01.05°E	TR1434
Penny's Green	Norfolk	52.54°N 01.16°E	TM1599
Pennytinney	Cornwall	50.55°N 04.81°W	SX0177
Pennywell	Sunderland	54.88°N 01.45°W	NZ3555

==== Peno-Pens ====
Location	Locality	Coordinates (links to map & photo sources)	OS grid reference
Pen-onn	The Vale Of Glamorgan	51.41°N 03.36°W	ST0569
Penparc	Ceredigion	52.10°N 04.61°W	SN2148
Penparc	Pembrokeshire	51.93°N 05.14°W	SM8431
Penparcau	Ceredigion	52.39°N 04.08°W	SN5880
Penpedairheol	Caerphilly	51.66°N 03.24°W	ST1497
Penpedairheol	Monmouthshire	51.72°N 02.97°W	SO3303
Penperlleni	Monmouthshire	51.73°N 02.98°W	SO3204
Penpethy	Cornwall	50.64°N 04.71°W	SX0886
Penpillick	Cornwall	50.37°N 04.70°W	SX0856
Penplas	Carmarthenshire	51.82°N 04.39°W	SN3517
Penpol	Cornwall	50.21°N 05.07°W	SW8139
Penpoll	Cornwall	50.35°N 04.61°W	SX1454
Penponds	Cornwall	50.20°N 05.32°W	SW6339
Penpont	Cornwall	50.53°N 04.71°W	SX0874
Penpont	Dumfries and Galloway	55.22°N 03.82°W	NX8494
Penprysg	Bridgend	51.52°N 03.50°W	SS9682
Penquit	Devon	50.37°N 03.91°W	SX6454
Penrallt	Gwynedd	52.88°N 04.42°W	SH3735
Penrallt	Powys	52.46°N 03.54°W	SN9586
Penrhiw	Caerphilly	51.61°N 03.09°W	ST2491
Penrhiwceiber	Rhondda, Cynon, Taff	51.66°N 03.37°W	ST0597
Pen-Rhiw-fawr	Neath Port Talbot	51.78°N 03.82°W	SN7411
Penrhiwgarreg	Blaenau Gwent	51.72°N 03.14°W	SO2104
Penrhiwgoch	Carmarthenshire	51.84°N 04.10°W	SN5518
Penrhiw-llan	Ceredigion	52.04°N 04.39°W	SN3641
Penrhiw-pal	Ceredigion	52.07°N 04.42°W	SN3445
Penrhiwtyn	Neath Port Talbot	51.63°N 03.82°W	SS7495
Penrhos	Gwynedd	52.89°N 04.48°W	SH326354
Penrhos	Herefordshire	52.19°N 03.01°W	SO3156
Penrhos	Isle of Anglesey	53.29°N 04.59°W	SH2781
Penrhos	Monmouthshire	51.79°N 02.85°W	SO4111
Penrhos	Powys	51.78°N 03.74°W	SN8011
Pen-rhos	Wrexham	53.06°N 03.07°W	SJ2853
Penrhosfeilw	Isle of Anglesey	53.28°N 04.67°W	SH2280
Penrhos Garnedd	Gwynedd	53.20°N 04.17°W	SH5570
Penrhyd Lastra	Isle of Anglesey	53.39°N 04.37°W	SH4291
Penrhyn Bay	Conwy	53.31°N 03.77°W	SH8281
Penrhyn Castle	Pembrokeshire	52.10°N 04.71°W	SN1449
Penrhyn-coch	Ceredigion	52.43°N 04.00°W	SN6484
Penrhyndeudraeth	Gwynedd	52.93°N 04.06°W	SH6139
Penrhyn-side	Conwy	53.31°N 03.78°W	SH8181
Penrhys	Rhondda, Cynon, Taff	51.64°N 03.44°W	ST0095
Penrice	Swansea	51.56°N 04.18°W	SS4987
Penrith	Cumbria	54.66°N 02.76°W	NY5130
Penrose (near Porthleven)	Cornwall	50.49°N 05.00°W	SW8770
Penrose (St Breward)	Cornwall	50.55°N 04.71°W	SX0876
Penrose Hill	Cornwall	50.08°N 05.31°W	SW6326
Penruddock	Cumbria	54.63°N 02.90°W	NY4227
Penryn	Cornwall	50.16°N 05.11°W	SW7834
Pensarn	Carmarthenshire	51.84°N 04.30°W	SN4119
Pensarn	Conwy	53.28°N 03.57°W	SH9578
Pensax	Worcestershire	52.31°N 02.41°W	SO7269
Pensby	Wirral	53.33°N 03.11°W	SJ2683
Penselwood	Somerset	51.07°N 02.35°W	ST7531
Pensford	Bath and North East Somerset	51.36°N 02.54°W	ST6263
Pensham	Worcestershire	52.09°N 02.08°W	SO9444
Penshaw	Sunderland	54.87°N 01.50°W	NZ3253
Penshurst	Kent	51.16°N 00.17°E	TQ5243
Pensilva	Cornwall	50.49°N 04.41°W	SX2969
Pensnett	Dudley	52.49°N 02.13°W	SO9189
Penston	East Lothian	55.93°N 02.89°W	NT4472
Penstone	Devon	50.78°N 03.74°W	SS7700
Penstraze	Cornwall	50.27°N 05.15°W	SW7546

==== Pent-Penz ====
Location	Locality	Coordinates (links to map & photo sources)	OS grid reference
Pentewan	Cornwall	50.28°N 04.79°W	SX0147
Pentiken	Shropshire	52.43°N 03.16°W	SO2183
Pentir	Gwynedd	53.17°N 04.14°W	SH5766
Pentire	Cornwall	50.40°N 05.11°W	SW7961
Pentire Point	Cornwall	50.58°N 04.92°W	SW934804
Pentirvin	Shropshire	52.60°N 02.99°W	SJ3301
Pentland Skerries	Orkney Islands	58.67°N 02.91°W	ND469766
Pentlepoir	Pembrokeshire	51.71°N 04.73°W	SN1105
Pentlow	Essex	52.06°N 00.63°E	TL8144
Pentlow Street	Essex	52.07°N 00.65°E	TL8245
Pentney	Norfolk	52.68°N 00.54°E	TF7213
Penton Corner	Hampshire	51.21°N 01.52°W	SU3346
Penton Grafton	Hampshire	51.22°N 01.54°W	SU3247
Penton Mewsey	Hampshire	51.22°N 01.52°W	SU3347
Pentonville	Islington	51.53°N 00.11°W	TQ3183
Pentowin	Carmarthenshire	51.83°N 04.48°W	SN2918
Pentraeth	Isle of Anglesey	53.27°N 04.22°W	SH5278
Pentrapeod	Caerphilly	51.70°N 03.17°W	SO1901
Pentre	Carmarthenshire	51.76°N 04.17°W	SN5010
Pentre	Denbighshire	53.11°N 03.28°W	SJ1458
Pentre (Mold)	Flintshire	53.15°N 03.13°W	SJ2463
Pentre (Treuddyn)	Flintshire	53.12°N 03.13°W	SJ2459
Pentre (Cilcain)	Flintshire	53.16°N 03.24°W	SJ1764
Pentre (Connah's Quay)	Flintshire	53.19°N 03.01°W	SJ3267
Pentre (Churchstoke)	Powys	52.52°N 03.07°W	SO2792
Pentre (Mochdre)	Powys	52.46°N 03.38°W	SO0686
Pentre (Llangynog)	Powys	52.81°N 03.41°W	SJ0525
Pentre (Meifod)	Powys	52.70°N 03.25°W	SJ1513
Pentre (Leighton)	Powys	52.63°N 03.12°W	SJ2405
Pentre	Rhondda, Cynon, Taff	51.65°N 03.50°W	SS9696
Pentre (St Martin's)	Shropshire	52.92°N 03.01°W	SJ3237
Pentre (Oswestry Rural)	Shropshire	52.82°N 03.14°W	SJ2326
Pentre (Kinnerley)	Shropshire	52.74°N 02.94°W	SJ3617
Pentre (Wrexham)	Wrexham	52.95°N 03.07°W	SJ2840
Pentre (Ruabon)	Wrexham	52.96°N 03.02°W	SJ3141
Pentrebach	Carmarthenshire	51.98°N 03.71°W	SN8233
Pentrebach	Merthyr Tydfil	51.71°N 03.36°W	SO0603
Pentrebach	Rhondda, Cynon, Taff	51.59°N 03.32°W	ST0889
Pentrebach	Swansea	51.72°N 04.02°W	SN6005
Pentre-bach	Powys	51.98°N 03.60°W	SN9033
Pentrebane	Cardiff	51.49°N 03.26°W	ST1278
Pentre Berw	Isle of Anglesey	53.22°N 04.29°W	SH4772
Pentre-bont	Conwy	53.05°N 03.89°W	SH7352
Pentre Broughton	Wrexham	53.06°N 03.04°W	SJ3052
Pentre Bychan	Wrexham	53.01°N 03.04°W	SJ3047
Pentre-cefn	Shropshire	52.83°N 03.14°W	SJ2327
Pentre-celyn	Denbighshire	53.06°N 03.28°W	SJ1453
Pentrechwyth	Swansea	51.63°N 03.92°W	SS6795
Pentre Cilgwyn	Wrexham	52.91°N 03.16°W	SJ2236
Pentre-clawdd	Shropshire	52.88°N 03.05°W	SJ2932
Pentre-coed	Shropshire	52.93°N 02.96°W	SJ3538
Pentre-cwrt	Carmarthenshire	52.01°N 04.36°W	SN3838
Pentre Dolau Honddu	Powys	52.07°N 03.47°W	SN9943
Pentre-dwr	Swansea	51.64°N 03.89°W	SS6996
Pentredwr	Denbighshire	53.00°N 03.20°W	SJ1946
Pentrefelin	Carmarthenshire	51.88°N 04.05°W	SN5923
Pentrefelin	Ceredigion	52.12°N 04.03°W	SN6149
Pentrefelin	Conwy	53.24°N 03.80°W	SH8074
Pentrefelin	Denbighshire	52.97°N 03.19°W	SJ2043
Pentrefelin	Gwynedd	52.92°N 04.20°W	SH5239
Pentrefelin	Isle of Anglesey	53.40°N 04.36°W	SH4392
Pentre-Ffwrndan	Flintshire	53.24°N 03.12°W	SJ2572
Pentrefoelas	Conwy	53.04°N 03.68°W	SH8751
Pentref-y-groes	Caerphilly	51.67°N 03.17°W	ST1998
Pentre Galar	Pembrokeshire	51.94°N 04.66°W	SN1731
Pentre-Gwenlais	Carmarthenshire	51.82°N 04.03°W	SN6016
Pentre Gwynfryn	Gwynedd	52.82°N 04.09°W	SH5927
Pentre Halkyn	Flintshire	53.23°N 03.21°W	SJ1972
Pentreheyling	Shropshire	52.52°N 03.12°W	SO2493
Pentre Hodre	Shropshire	52.37°N 03.00°W	SO3276
Pentre Isaf	Conwy	53.19°N 03.69°W	SH8768
Pentre Llanrhaeadr	Denbighshire	53.14°N 03.37°W	SJ0862
Pentre Llifior	Powys	52.57°N 03.27°W	SO1498
Pentrellwyn	Ceredigion	52.05°N 04.32°W	SN4142
Pentre-llwyn-llwyd	Powys	52.17°N 03.52°W	SN9654
Pentre-llyn-cymmer	Conwy	53.05°N 03.53°W	SH9752
Pentre Maelor	Wrexham	53.03°N 02.94°W	SJ3749
Pentre Meyrick	The Vale Of Glamorgan	51.46°N 03.49°W	SS9675
Pentre-newydd	Shropshire	52.91°N 03.10°W	SJ2636
Pentre-poeth	City of Newport	51.56°N 03.06°W	ST2686
Pentre-Poeth	Carmarthenshire	51.68°N 04.17°W	SN5001
Pentre-Piod	Torfaen	51.71°N 03.07°W	SO2602
Pentre'r beirdd	Powys	52.70°N 03.21°W	SJ1813
Pentre'r-felin	Denbighshire	53.17°N 03.33°W	SJ1165
Pentre'r-felin	Powys	51.95°N 03.58°W	SN9130
Pentre'r Felin	Conwy	53.20°N 03.79°W	SH8069
Pentre-ty-gwyn	Carmarthenshire	52.00°N 03.73°W	SN8135
Pentre-uchaf	Conwy	53.27°N 03.69°W	SH8777
Pentreuchaf	Gwynedd	52.92°N 04.45°W	SH3539
Pentrich	Derbyshire	53.06°N 01.43°W	SK3852
Pentridge	Dorset	50.95°N 01.95°W	SU0317
Pentrisil	Pembrokeshire	51.97°N 04.82°W	SN0634
Pentwyn	Cardiff	51.52°N 03.15°W	ST2081
Pentwyn (near Focriw)	Caerphilly	51.72°N 03.30°W	SO1004
Pen-twyn (near Trinant)	Caerphilly	51.69°N 03.15°W	SO2000
Pen-twyn	Carmarthenshire	51.77°N 04.08°W	SN5611
Pen-twyn	Torfaen	51.72°N 03.07°W	SO2603
Pentwyn Berthlwyd	Merthyr Tydfil	51.65°N 03.30°W	ST1096
Pentwyn-mawr	Caerphilly	51.65°N 03.17°W	ST1996
Pentyrch	Cardiff	51.52°N 03.29°W	ST1082
Pentywyn	Carmarthenshire	51.74°N 04.56°W	SN2308
Pen-Ucha'r Plwyf	Flintshire	53.23°N 03.24°W	SJ1772
Penwartha	Cornwall	50.32°N 05.16°W	SW7552
Penwartha Coombe	Cornwall	50.32°N 05.14°W	SW7652
Penweathers	Cornwall	50.24°N 05.08°W	SW8043
Penwithick	Cornwall	50.37°N 04.78°W	SX0256
Penwood	Hampshire	51.34°N 01.36°W	SU4461
Penwortham Lane	Lancashire	53.72°N 02.71°W	SD5326
Penwyllt	Powys	51.82°N 03.67°W	SN8515
Pen-y-Ball Top	Flintshire	53.26°N 03.24°W	SJ1775
Pen-y-banc	Carmarthenshire	51.86°N 04.28°W	SN4321
Penybanc	Carmarthenshire	51.78°N 04.01°W	SN6111
Pen-y-bank	Caerphilly	51.71°N 03.28°W	SO1103
Penybedd	Carmarthenshire	51.69°N 04.30°W	SN4102
Penybont	Ceredigion	52.47°N 04.03°W	SN6288
Penybont	Powys	52.26°N 03.30°W	SO1164
Pen-y-Bont	Blaenau Gwent	51.73°N 03.14°W	SO2105
Pen-y-bont	Carmarthenshire	51.91°N 04.47°W	SN3027
Pen-y-bont	Gwynedd	52.83°N 04.07°W	SH6028
Pen-y-bont ar Ogwr (Bridgend)	Bridgend	51.50°N 03.58°W	SS9080
Pen-y-bont Llanerch Emrys	Powys	52.79°N 03.17°W	SJ2123
Pen-y-Bryn	Pembrokeshire	52.04°N 04.67°W	SN1742
Pen-y-Bryn	Shropshire	52.93°N 03.01°W	SJ3238
Pen-y-bryn (Llanelltyd)	Gwynedd	52.75°N 03.94°W	SH6919
Pen-y-bryn (Criccieth)	Gwynedd	52.91°N 04.24°W	SH4938
Pen-y-bryn	Powys	52.62°N 03.24°W	SJ1604
Pen-y-bryn	Wrexham	52.98°N 03.10°W	SJ2644
Penybryn	Caerphilly	51.65°N 03.25°W	ST1396
Pen-y-cae	Bridgend	51.52°N 03.58°W	SS9082
Pen-y-cae	Neath Port Talbot	51.58°N 03.77°W	SS7789
Pen-y-cae	Powys	51.80°N 03.68°W	SN8413
Penycae	Wrexham	52.99°N 03.08°W	SJ2745
Pen-y-cae-mawr	Monmouthshire	51.65°N 02.85°W	ST4195
Penycaerau	Gwynedd	52.81°N 04.68°W	SH1927
Pen-y-cefn	Flintshire	53.26°N 03.33°W	SJ1175
Pen-y-clawdd	Monmouthshire	51.75°N 02.79°W	SO4507
Pen-y-coed	Shropshire	52.79°N 03.08°W	SJ2723
Penycwm	Pembrokeshire	51.86°N 05.12°W	SM8523
Pen-y-Darren	Merthyr Tydfil	51.75°N 03.37°W	SO0507
Penydre	Swansea	51.70°N 03.89°W	SN6902
Pen-y-fai	Bridgend	51.52°N 03.60°W	SS8982
Pen-y-fai	Carmarthenshire	51.68°N 04.18°W	SN4901
Pen-y-fan	Carmarthenshire	51.67°N 04.15°W	SS5199
Pen-y-fan	Monmouthshire	51.74°N 02.68°W	SO5305
Penyfeidr	Pembrokeshire	51.89°N 05.09°W	SM8726
Pen-y-felin	Flintshire	53.21°N 03.27°W	SJ1569
Pen-y-ffordd	Denbighshire	53.29°N 03.47°W	SJ0278
Pen-y-ffordd	Flintshire	53.31°N 03.30°W	SJ1381
Penyffordd	Flintshire	53.14°N 03.04°W	SJ3061
Penyffridd	Gwynedd	53.08°N 04.24°W	SH5056
Pen y Foel	Powys	52.78°N 03.09°W	SJ2621
Pen-y-garn	Carmarthenshire	51.96°N 04.07°W	SN5731
Pen-y-garn	Ceredigion	52.45°N 04.02°W	SN6285
Penygarn	Torfaen	51.70°N 03.04°W	SO2801
Pen-y-garnedd	Isle of Anglesey	53.26°N 04.20°W	SH5376
Penygarnedd	Powys	52.79°N 03.33°W	SJ1023
Penygelli	Powys	52.51°N 03.29°W	SO1291
Penygraig	Rhondda, Cynon, Taff	51.60°N 03.46°W	SS9991
Pen-y-graig	Gwynedd	52.86°N 04.67°W	SH2033
Penygraigwen	Isle of Anglesey	53.35°N 04.34°W	SH4487
Penygroes	Gwynedd	53.05°N 04.29°W	SH4653
Penygroes	Pembrokeshire	51.986°N 04.688°W	SN1535
Pen-y-groes	Carmarthenshire	51.79°N 04.06°W	SN5813
Penygroeslon	Gwynedd	52.83°N 04.65°W	SH2130
Pen-y-lan	City of Newport	51.55°N 03.08°W	ST2585
Pen-y-lan	The Vale Of Glamorgan	51.47°N 03.45°W	SS9976
Penylan	Cardiff	51.49°N 03.16°W	ST1978
Pen-y-maes	Flintshire	53.27°N 03.21°W	SJ1976
Penymynydd	Flintshire	53.15°N 03.04°W	SJ3062
Pen-y-Park	Herefordshire	52.08°N 03.06°W	SO2744
Penyraber	Pembrokeshire	51.99°N 04.98°W	SM9537
Pen-yr-englyn	Rhondda, Cynon, Taff	51.66°N 03.53°W	SS9497
Pen-yr-heol	Bridgend	51.52°N 03.55°W	SS9282
Pen-yr-heol	Monmouthshire	51.79°N 02.82°W	SO4311
Penyrheol	Caerphilly	51.58°N 03.24°W	ST1488
Penyrheol	Swansea	51.67°N 04.05°W	SS5899
Penyrheol	Torfaen	51.68°N 03.04°W	ST2899
Pen-y-rhiw	Rhondda, Cynon, Taff	51.58°N 03.35°W	ST0688
Penysarn	Isle of Anglesey	53.38°N 04.33°W	SH4590
Pen-y-stryt	Denbighshire	53.05°N 03.20°W	SJ1951
Penywaun	Rhondda, Cynon, Taff	51.72°N 03.49°W	SN9704
Pen-y-wern	Shropshire	52.39°N 03.03°W	SO3078
Penzance	Cornwall	50.11°N 05.55°W	SW4630
