= Philip J. K. James =

British businessman (born 1978)

Philip James
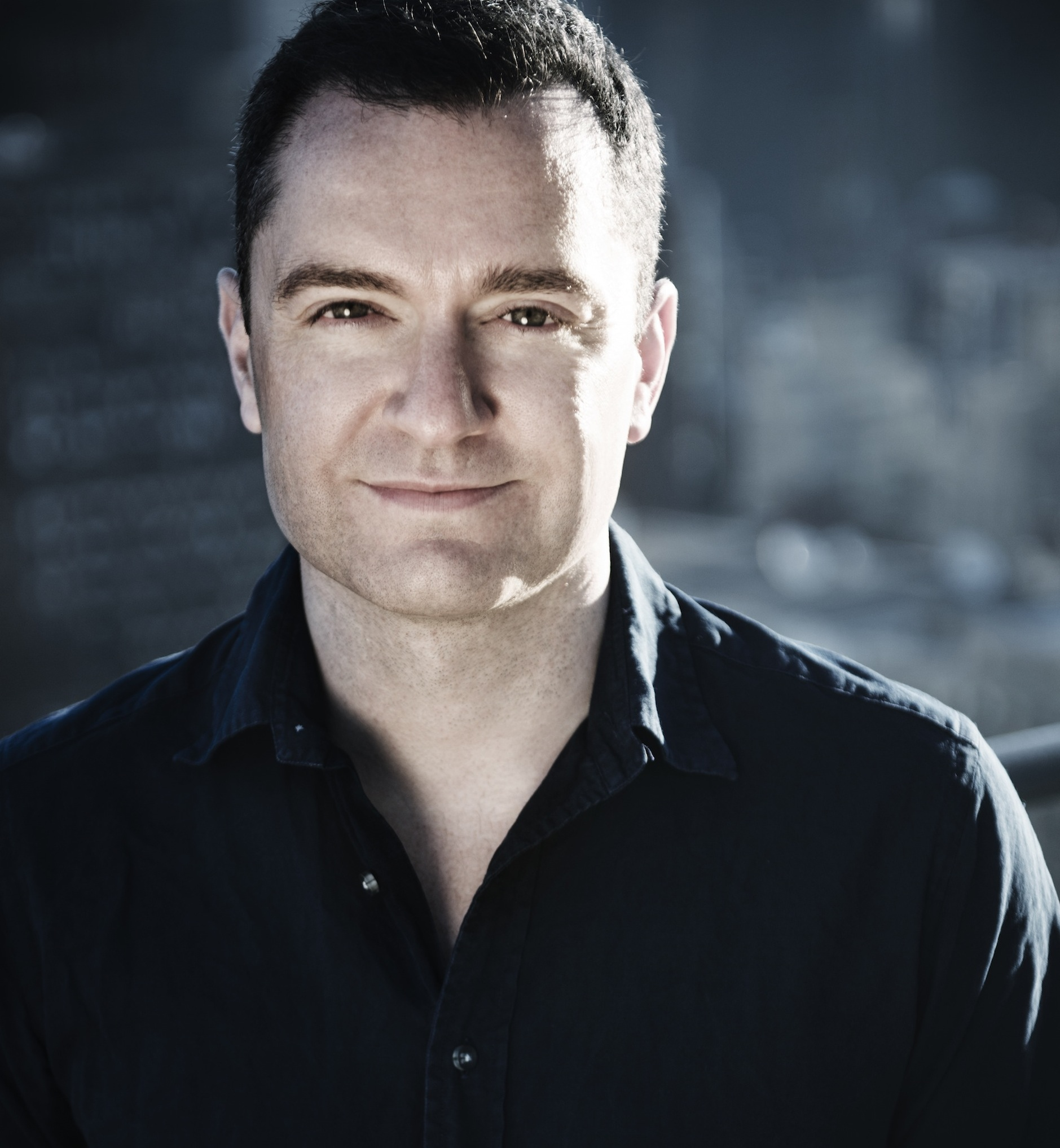
- Born: June 30, 1978 (age 48)
- Education: Oxford University (M.Chem. 1999) Columbia Business School (M.B.A. 2005)
- Occupation: Wine entrepreneur
- Known for: Co-founder of Penrose Hill, Lot18 and Snooth

Philip James (born June 30, 1978) is a British entrepreneur and adventurer living in the US. He is currently CEO of Penrose Hill, a wine company based in Napa, California that sells through its website Firstleaf.com and through retail. He was also the founding CEO of both Lot18, a private sale site for wine and food, and Snooth, a comparison shopping site for wine.

== Career ==
Philip is CEO of Penrose Hill a wine company based in Napa, California, that sells through its website Firstleaf.com and through retail. The company is backed by Loeb Enterprises, Greycroft Ventures, Tribeca Venture Partners and Primary Ventures and has won over 2,800 awards for its wines.

Previously James was the founding CEO of Lot18, a website that provides consumers with access to a curated selection of wines. Lot18 is headquartered in New York City, and is backed by $45 million in venture capital from Accel, NEA and FirstMark Capital. Prior to Lot18, James was the founding CEO of Snooth, a lifestyle media company with several properties, including Snooth.com, TheSpir.it and WhatsCook.in. James is also a founder of Popdust, a music focused content and commerce company backed by RRE Ventures, NEA, Lerer Ventures, Softbank, Raptor and Project A.

James was named a Finalist in the 2012 Ernst and Young Entrepreneur of the Year awards and to Business Insider’s 2011 “Silicon Alley 100” list of the most important figures in the New York tech sector. He was also invited to be in the second annual class of NYC Venture Fellows, a program from Mayor Michael Bloomberg’s office that recognizes the achievements of the city’s most promising entrepreneurs. James is also a mentor at the New York branch of Techstars, a startup accelerator program.

James graduated from St Hugh's College, Oxford in 1999, at age 20, with a master's degree in Chemistry and Columbia Business School in 2005 with his MBA. In addition he holds the Certified Specialist of Wine from the Society of Wine Educators.

== Expeditions ==
In 2013 James rode his motorcycle 17,000 miles around the world, raising money for Wine to Water, a water charity with projects in 15 countries. His trip was cut short after needing surgery upon crashing in Kazakhstan. James is also a mountaineer and a sailor. A certified Yachtmaster, James has sailed in many offshore races, including the Trans-Atlantic ARC race in 2002. He has also climbed on five continents and climbed Mount Everest in 2003 and played a role in the high altitude rescue of Conan Harrod from Everest's North Face.

== Charity ==
In 2014, James and Kevin Boyer, his business partner at CustomVine, were the faces of an internet hoax which described the invention of a "Miracle Machine", an appliance that could turn water into wine. The hoax was designed to raise awareness for Wine to Water, a water charity that James has supported in the past. The Miracle Machine news went viral with over 500 million media impressions and over 500 media outlets around the world covering the story. The campaign was a co-winner for the Community Relations category at the 2014 Platinum PR Awards, was named as one of the Top 15 Internet Hoaxes of 2014 by the Washington Post and one of the 10 Best Cause Marketing Campaigns by Selfish Giving.

In addition to his current personal work with Wine to Water, Charity: Water is the official charity of Lot18. Also in 2002 James worked for several months as a volunteer teacher in La Paz, Bolivia.

== See also ==
- List of wine personalities
