= Pencraig =

Pencraig may refer to one of several places:

- Pencraig, Anglesey
- Pencraig, Herefordshire, a location in the United Kingdom
- Pencraig, Powys, a location in the United Kingdom
- Old Radnor, known as Pencraig in Welsh

== See also ==
- Pen-y-graig (disambiguation)
