= Lot18 =

- Type: Privately held company
- Industry: Online shopping Wine
- Founded: October 12, 2010; 15 years ago
- Founder: Philip J. K. James
- Defunct: 2023
- Headquarters: New York City, United States
- Area served: Worldwide
- Products: Tasting Room; Amukan; Axiom; Finial; Letter Press; Loophole; Mythmaker; Neptune's Trident; Q8
- Number of employees: 50-100 (2020)
- Website: lot18.com

Lot18, was an American online retailer of wine that was based in New York, and Napa, California. It operated from 2010 until 2023 after laying off staff and closing the business. Before its closure, Lot18 sold wines from around the globe and also created custom wines and brands, including Axiom, Mythmaker, Finial, Q8, Amukan, Loophole, and Neptune's Trident, among others.

== History ==
=== Foundation and early years ===
Lot18 was launched in October 2010 by Philip J. K. James, who previously founded Snooth, a wine information website, and Kevin Fortuna, the former CEO of Quigo, a search-engine marketing company that was acquired by AOL.

Lot18 began as a flash sale website for wines, with a business model similar to that of Gilt Groupe. The company initially focused on providing access to smaller, lesser-known wine producers. It later expanded its offerings to include large, well-known brands, as well as custom-produced wines.

Lot18 secured its initial funding from "friends and family." In November 2010, Lot18 raised $3 million in its Series A round of funding from venture capital firm FirstMark Capital. In May 2011, venture capital firm New Enterprise Associates led a Series B $10 million round of funding, with participation from FirstMark Capital. In November 2011, venture capital firm Accel Partners led the Series C funding of $30 million, with participation from New Enterprise Associates and FirstMark Capital.

=== Acquisitions ===
In December 2011, Lot18 acquired Paris based Vinobest to begin its expansion into Europe. Vinobest was founded in 2010 by Paul Guillet and Thierry Rochas. Early in 2012, Lot18 began operations in the United Kingdom with Will Armitage, the company's general manager for Europe indicating they hoped to sign up a million British members. The company later dissolved the UK operations, stating that the "supermarket's stranglehold on the U.K. market proved too powerful" to compete with.

In January 2013, Lot18 acquired the assets of Santa Rosa, Calif., based Tasting Room, which was founded by former Apple executive Tim Bucher, and had developed a system for creating sampler kits with 50 milliliter bottles. Lot18 subsequently utilized the assets of Tasting Room as part of creating its personalized wine club, which also goes by the name Tasting Room.

=== Tasting Room ===
Lot18 launched wine club Tasting Room to the public in May 2013. Utilizing the bottling technology developed by Tasting Room, Inc., Lot18 develops unique wine profiles for its club members. The club's customers taste mini bottles of wine and rate them online to create customized shipments of standard-size bottles of wine. Tasting Room is also the company that powers the Forbes Wine Club. As of 2022, Tasting Room Wine Club management and fulfillment have transferred to Gold Medal Wine Club.
