= Penny Hill =

Penny Hill or Pennyhill may refer to:

== People ==
- Penny Hill (musician)

== Places ==
- Pennyhill, Delaware, USA
- Pennyhill Park Hotel, England
- Penny Hill, Calderdale, a location in West Yorkshire, England
- Penny Hill, Leeds, a place in Hunslet, West Yorkshire, England
- Penny Hill, Lincolnshire, a location in England

== See also ==
- Penn Hill, England
- Penn Hills, Pennsylvania, USA
- Penn Hills Resort, USA
