= Ramridge Park =

Hamlet in Hampshire, England

Coordinates: 51.2284486°N 1.5524120°W

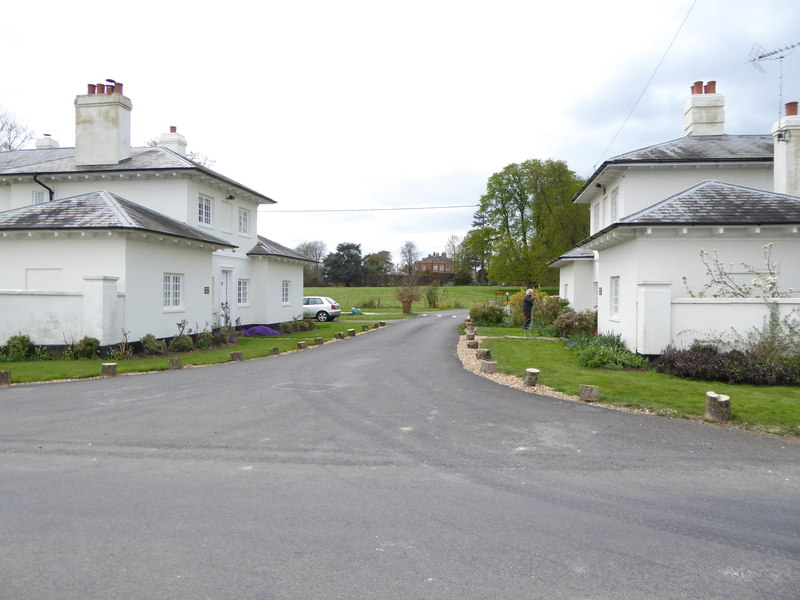
- View of Ramridge House from the entrance

- Location within Hampshire
- Civil parish: The Pentons
- District: Test Valley
- Shire county: Hampshire
- Region: South East
- Country: England
- Sovereign state: United Kingdom
- Post town: ANDOVER
- Postcode district: SP11
- Dialling code: 01264
- Police: Hampshire and Isle of Wight
- Fire: Hampshire and Isle of Wight
- Ambulance: South Central
- UK Parliament: North West Hampshire

Ramridge Park is a hamlet in the civil parish of The Pentons in the Test Valley district of Hampshire, England. It is in the civil parish of Penton Grafton. Its nearest town is Andover, which lies approximately 3.75 miles (6 km) south-east from the hamlet.

== Ramridge House ==
=== History ===
Ramridge Park sits near to Ramridge House, a Grade II* listed house. Ramridge was originally a religious house granted by William the Conqueror to the Abbey of Grestain in Normandy. In 1442, William de la Pole and his wife, Alice Chaucer, granddaughter and heir of Geoffrey Chaucer, used the site to endow their new foundation, God's House at Ewelme. The nearby Weyhill fair, one of the largest in England, may have been part of the Ramridge manor's appurtenance. Daniel Defoe, in his 1722 travels, made a special detour to visit the fair. Thomas Hardy later used it as the setting for "The Mayor of Casterbridge," where it was renamed Weydon Priors.

=== Recent History ===
The current three-story red-brick house was constructed around 1740. It was remodeled in the 19th century with additions on either side and a Bath stone Ionic porch at the front entrance on the north. At the park's entrance are two identical lodges: one from the 19th century and a 20th-century copy. A 1740 estate map shows rides cut through the woodland north of the house. These, along with much of the park's original planting, including two lines of boundary trees to the south and west, are still visible on current aerial photographs. The kitchen garden, which first appeared on the 1740 map, survives intact but without its formal planting. During World War II the mansion became a Royal Air Force headquarters and Officers' Mess up until 1952.

=== Present Day ===
The main house has been divided into flats and offices, and the lodges are now in private ownership
