= Hublished =

Hublished, Inc.
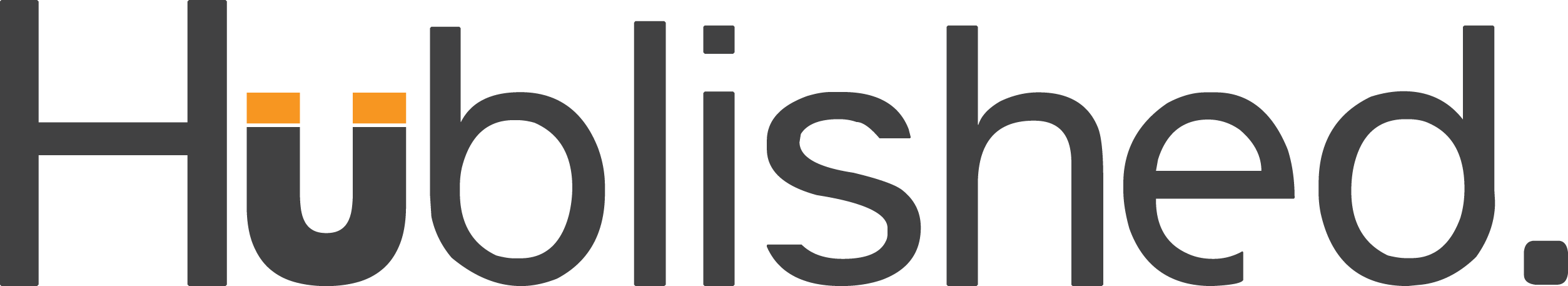
- Company type: Private
- Available in: English
- Headquarters: Manhattan, New York
- Area served: Worldwide
- Founders: Ben Borodach; Nis Frome; Yair Aviner
- Website: hublished.com
- Registration: Required
- Launched: July 2013
- Current status: Defunct

Hublished was an online community for businesses and professionals to share and discover webinars, whitepapers, and other business content. The company was founded in June 2012, and the website entered private beta on July 30, 2013. Hublished is an online channel for businesses to create landing pages for upcoming and recorded webinars, independent of which webinar software they use. The site enables industry professionals to explore, register for, share, and curate content all on Hublished. Founded by students from Rutgers University and New York University, Hublished is based in New York City.

== History ==
Hublished was co-founded by high school friends Ben Borodach, Nis Frome, and Yair Aviner, along with Ryan Kuhel, Carlos Ospina, Alex Lau, Chris Dilks, Kyle Byrne, and Alex Topchishvili. Frome and Aviner previously operated a web design and digital marketing company called Take It Worldwide during which time Frome conceived the idea for Hublished. Recalling his experience in digital marketing, Frome said that "This thing was exploding, this content marketing revolution, But there wasn’t really a site to hold all this content. You would have to already know the brand, go to their website, sign up for it there, then know another brand, get it there, know a friend on LinkedIn, get it there—very, very fragmented."

The founders had the idea for Hublished for nearly a year before pursuing the project. Kuhel entered the concept for Hublished into the "Ready, FIRE!, Aim" competition run through FirstMark Capital Managing Director, Lawrence Lenihan's class at NYU. The Hublished team initially lost the competition, but pursued the venture at the urging of Lenihan, who cited their lack of initiative as one of the reason they lost the competition.

Twelve months later, Lenihan reversed his decision, awarding an investment of $12,500 to Hublished. He wrote on his blog "Since the class ended, they have kept focus and have kept growing their business despite setbacks and obstacles." Soon after, Lenihan appeared in a TechCrunch interview with two of the Hublished founders.

Hublished is currently in the NYC SeedStart accelerator run by seed investor, Owen Davis. To date, Hublished has raised $175,000.

== Reception ==
Hublished has been favorably described in articles published by TechCrunch, VentureBeat, and BestTechie.

Devindra Hardawar, writing for VentureBeat, said "Hublished’s webinar discovery platform could actually make you care about webinars." Hardawar jokingly remarked "I’ve never said the word webinar as many times in a single day as I did when I talked with the folks from Hublished. And I’ve never imagined anybody, let alone a team of college students, could be so obsessed with them."
