= Pentwyn =

Pentwyn (or Pen-twyn) may refer to the following places in south-east Wales:

- Pentwyn, Cardiff, a district of the city of Cardiff
  - Pentwyn (electoral ward)
- Pentwyn, Caerphilly, a village in the Darran Valley
- Pen-twyn, Carmarthenshire, a hamlet near Cross Hands
- Pentwyn, Fochriw, a hamlet in Caerphilly, near Fochriw
- Pentwyn, Torfaen, a village near Abersychan
- Pen-twyn, Trinant, a village in Caerphilly, near Trinant
- Pentwyn Berthlwyd, a village in Merthyr Tydfil, near Treharris
- Pentwyn Deintyr, village in Merthyr Tydfil
- Pentwyn-mawr, village in Caerphilly, near Pontllanfraith

== See also ==
- Pentwyn, Llanllowell, 16th-century farmhouse in Monmouthshire, Wales
- Pentwyn, Rockfield, 19th-century house in Monmouthshire
