= Pentrefelin =

Pentrefelin is the name of several places in Wales:

- Pentrefelin, Anglesey
- Pentrefelin, Carmarthenshire
- Pentrefelin, Ceredigion
- Pentrefelin, Conwy
- Pentrefelin, Denbighshire
- Pentrefelin, Gwynedd
- Pentrefelin, Powys, two miles south-east of Llanrhaeadr-ym-Mochnant, location of the now closed Pentrefelin railway station
