= Peinlich =

Coordinates: 57.542°N 6.321°W

Peinlich: Scottish Gaelic: Peighinn an Lighiche
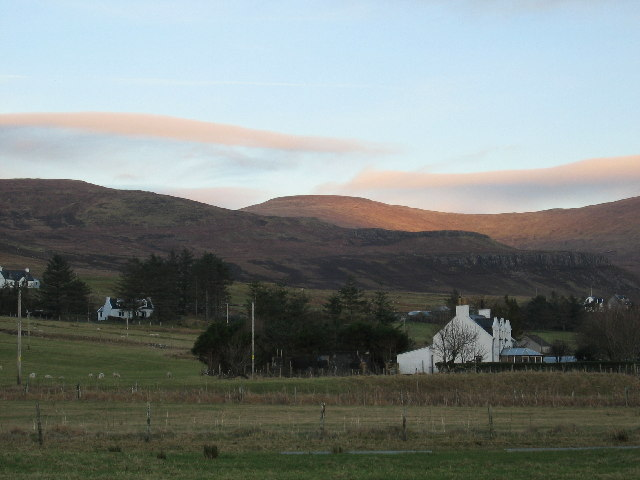

- Location within the Isle of Skye
- OS grid reference: NG4158
- Council area: Highland
- Lieutenancy area: Ross and Cromarty
- Country: Scotland
- Sovereign state: United Kingdom
- Post town: PORTREE
- Postcode district: IV51
- Police: Scotland
- Fire: Scottish
- Ambulance: Scottish
- UK Parliament: Ross, Skye and Lochaber
- Scottish Parliament: Ross, Skye and Inverness West

Peinlich (Scottish Gaelic: Peighinn an Lighiche) is a hamlet on the Isle of Skye in Scotland. Its main claim to fame is that its name is German for "embarrassing".

See List of United Kingdom locations: Pe-Pen.
