= Unbutton Your Heart =

Studio album by Penny Hill
- Released: 12 March 2010
- Recorded: 2010
- Genre: Folk
- Length: 40:21
- Label: Shinola

Unbutton Your Heart is the debut studio album by Penny Hill. It was released on 12 March 2010.

== Track listing ==
1. "Salem" - 3:48
2. "(un)Certainties" - 2:57
3. "Summertime" - 3:21
4. "The Wind (For Margaret)" - 3:49
5. "This Fire" - 5:29
6. "Song for John" - 3:10
7. "Where the Light Is" - 6:41
8. "Waiting" - 5:33
9. "Not in Love" - 5:33
