= Hawk Conservancy Trust =

Bird park and conservation charity in Weyhill, Hampshire, England

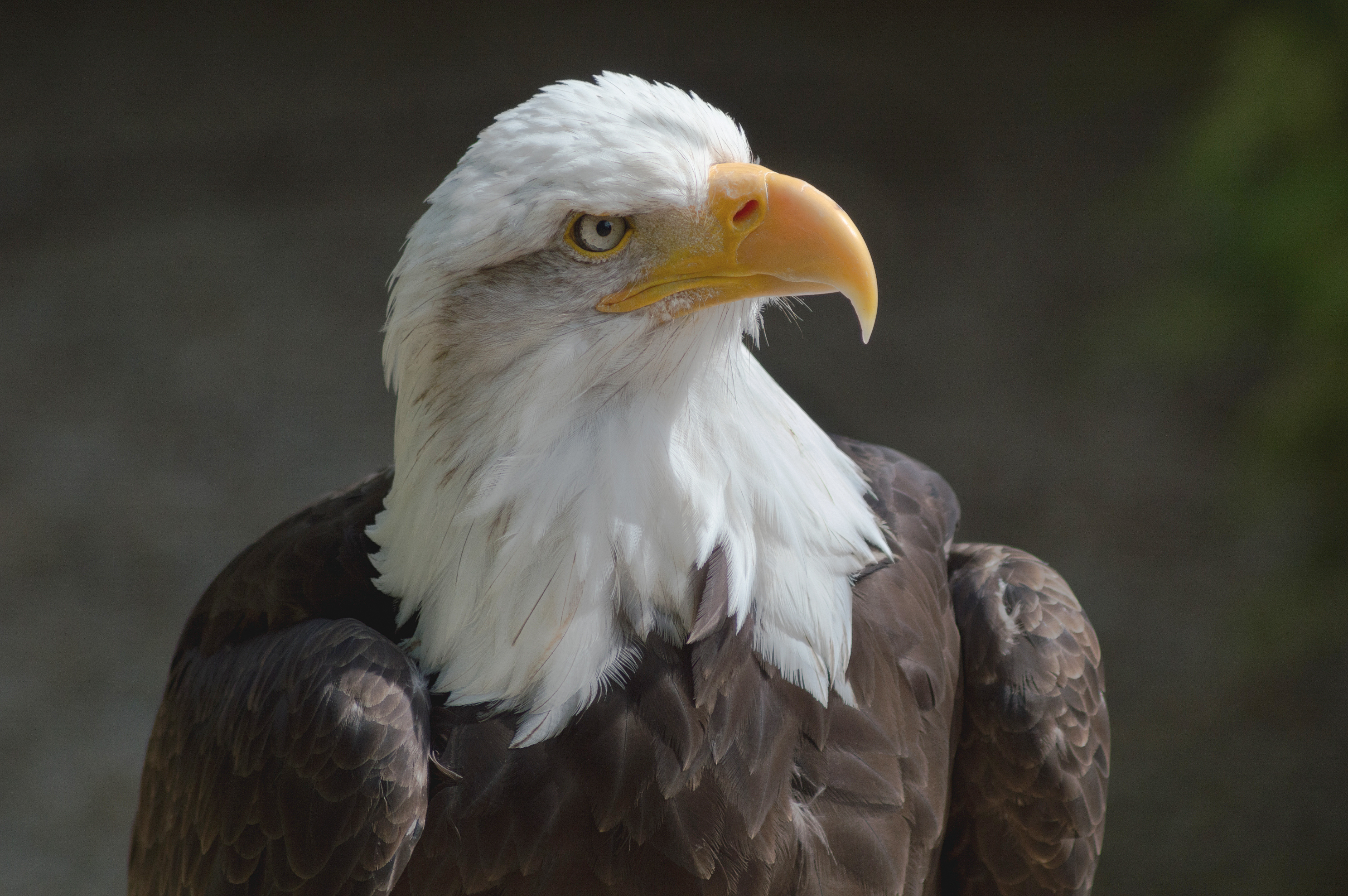
- Bald eagle at the Hawk Conservancy Trust
- Established: 1966
- Founders: Reg Smith; Hilary Smith
- Type: Nonprofit
- Registration no.: 1092349
- Legal status: Charity
- Purpose: Nature conservation
- Coordinates: 51.2073°N 1.5622°W
- Website: www.hawk-conservancy.org
- Formerly called: Weyhill Zoo

The Hawk Conservancy Trust is a bird park and conservation charity that cares for and displays birds of prey. It is located in Weyhill, Hampshire, England, near to the A303 road and the town of Andover. The site is home to more than 130 birds of prey and it spans 22 acres (8.9 ha) of woodland and wildflower meadow.

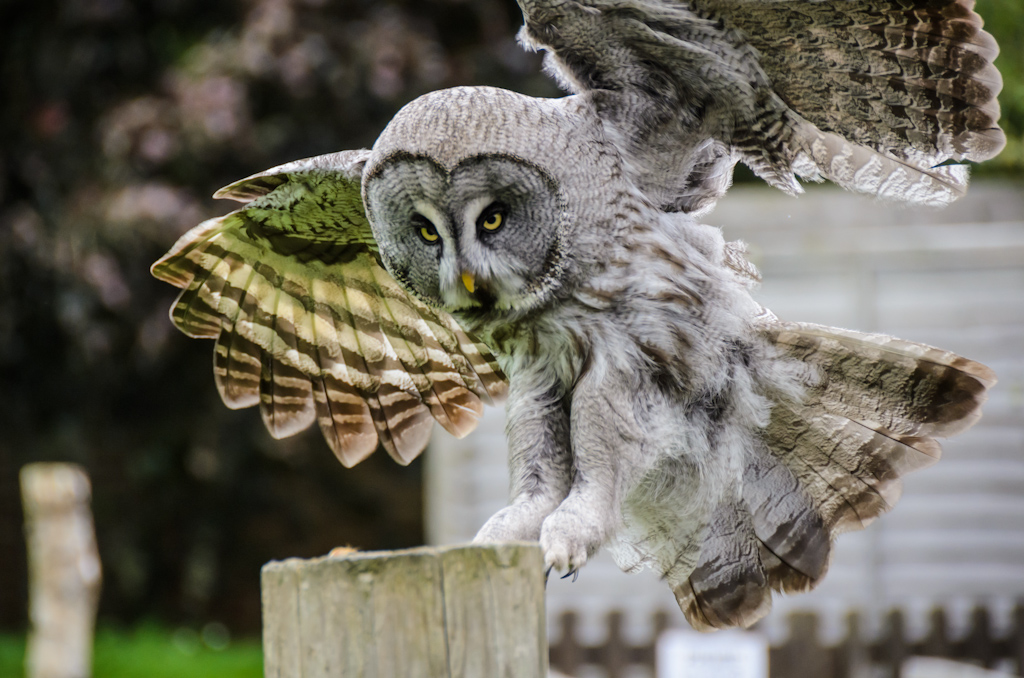
A great grey owl perching during a flying display

Founded as a zoo by local farmer Reg Smith and his wife Hilary, the park was incorporated as the Hawk Conservancy Trust in 2002. It is also the site of the National Bird of Prey Hospital, a veterinary hospital that takes in injured birds of prey. The Hawk Conservancy Trust funds its charitable work mainly from the running of its bird of prey visitor centre.

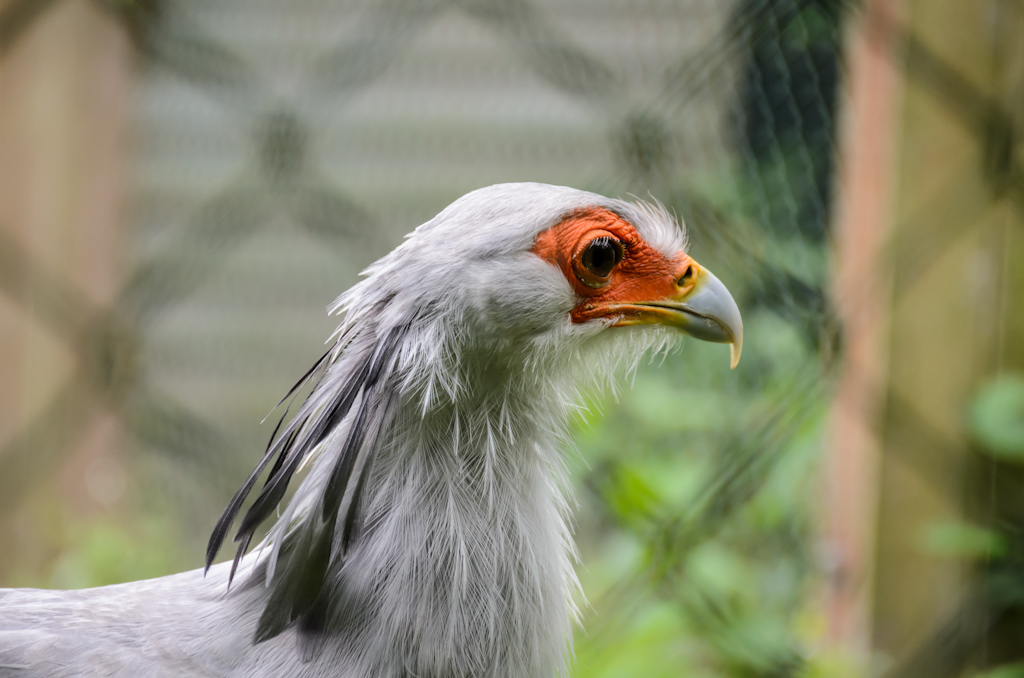
Secretarybird

In 2016, a male secretarybird that was kept at the Hawk Conservancy Trust was studied by researchers. They tested its kicking ability and their findings had implications for studying how other species move, including extinct birds. It was also suggested that this type of research about extreme examples of animal movement could help design fast-moving robot limbs or prosthetics.

== See also ==
- Birdworld
