= Carrine Common & Penwethers =

Protected area in Cornwall, England

Coordinates: 50.2514°N 5.0894°W

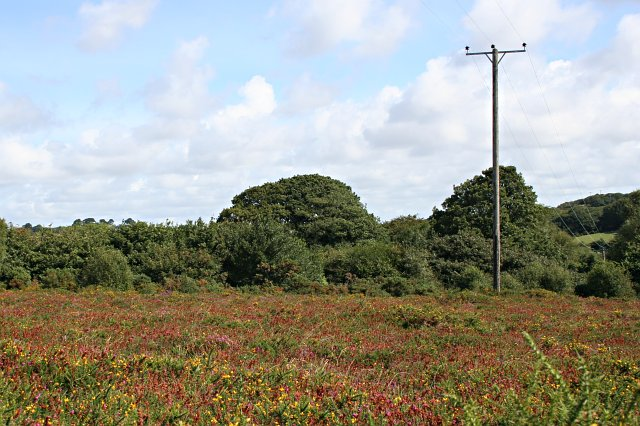
Carrine Common

Carrine Common & Penwethers is a Site of Special Scientific Interest (SSSI) in Cornwall, England, UK, noted for its biological characteristics. The 46-hectare (110-acre) site is located at the settlement of Penweathers, within the civil parish of Kea, half a mile south of the city of Truro.

'Carrine Common' is also designated a Special Area of Conservation.
