= Lawrence Lenihan =

American businessperson

Lawrence D. Lenihan
- Born: c. 1965 (age 60–61); United States
- Education: Duke University (B.S.), Wharton School of the University of Pennsylvania (MBA)
- Occupations: Entrepreneur, investor, educator
- Known for: Co-founder and Co-CEO of Resonance and founding partner at FirstMark Capital
- Title: Co-CEO, Resonance

Lawrence Lenihan is an American entrepreneur, investor, and educator. He is the co-founder and co-chief executive officer of Resonance Companies, a venture capital firm that develops and scales fashion brands using technology and sustainable manufacturing.

He was previously a founding partner at FirstMark Capital, a New York–based venture capital firm. Lenihan has also served as an adjunct professor of entrepreneurship at the New York University Stern School of Business.

== Early life and education ==
Lenihan earned a Bachelor of Science in electrical engineering from Duke University in 1987 and an MBA from the Wharton School of the University of Pennsylvania.

== Career ==
Lenihan began his career at IBM in product development and sales. He later worked in venture investing and co-founded Pequot Ventures, which eventually spun out as FirstMark Capital. At FirstMark, he invested in early-stage technology companies and served on several corporate boards.

In 2009, Lenihan co-founded the women's apparel company Norisol Ferrari, his partner's eponymous label, and served on its board as chair. Additionally he acquired Crouch & Fitzgerald, a company founded in 1839.

In 2015, Lenihan co-founded Resonance Companies with venture partner Christian Gheorghe. The firm focuses on creating a more sustainable model for the fashion industry through on-demand manufacturing and digital design tools. He has been featured in business and fashion trade publications for his efforts to merge technology with apparel production.

The first company backed by Resonance was Tucker by Gaby Basora and JC-RT was the second. Lenihan was also a member of the NYC Economic Development Fashion 2020 Advisory Board and has served as a panel judge for competitions held by the Council of Fashion Designers of America.

== Other positions ==
Lenihan has served as an adjunct professor at the NYU Stern School of Business, where he teaches entrepreneurship and mentors student founders. He has also been active in alumni initiatives at Duke University related to entrepreneurship and engineering.

Lenihan has held board positions with several technology and fashion-related companies, including TraceLink and Digital Currency Group.
