= Penton Corner =

Hamlet in Hampshire, England

Coordinates: 51.21492°N 1.52897°W

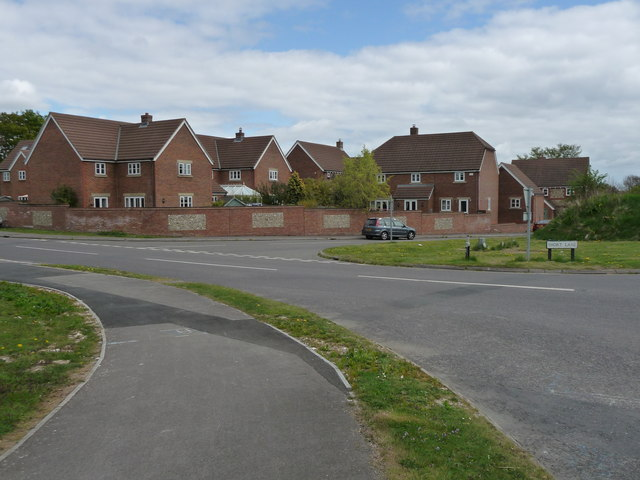

- Location within Hampshire
- OS grid reference: SU329462
- Civil parish: Penton Mewsey
- District: Test Valley
- Shire county: Hampshire
- Region: South East
- Country: England
- Sovereign state: United Kingdom
- Post town: ANDOVER
- Postcode district: SP11
- Dialling code: 01264
- Police: Hampshire and Isle of Wight
- Fire: Hampshire and Isle of Wight
- Ambulance: South Central
- UK Parliament: North West Hampshire

Penton Corner is a hamlet in the civil parish of Penton Mewsey in the Test Valley district of Hampshire, England. Its nearest town is Andover, which lies approximately 2 miles (3 km) east from the hamlet.
