= Pearson's Green =

.
