= Pentwyn, Llanllowell =

Pentwyn
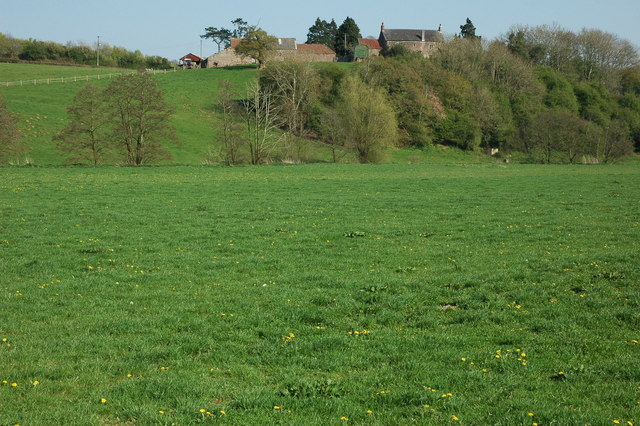
- "a Georgian reconstruction of an important 16th century house"

- Location within Monmouthshire
- 51.6873°N 2.8812°W
- Type: Farmhouse
- Location: Llanllowell, Monmouthshire

History
- Built: c.1560–1570

Site notes
- Architectural style: Vernacular
- Governing body: Privately owned

Listed Building – Grade II*
- Official name: Pentwyn
- Designated: 18 November 1980
- Reference no.: 2717

Listed Building – Grade II
- Official name: Barn at Pentwyn
- Designated: 22 June 2000
- Reference no.: 23499

Pentwyn, Llanllowell, Monmouthshire is a farmhouse dating from the mid-16th century. The house is Grade II* listed, with the adjacent barn having its own Grade II listing.

== History and description ==
Sir Cyril Fox and Lord Raglan, in their three-volume study Monmouthshire Houses, date the building to 1560–1570. They describe it as originally constructed to an L-plan. The house was rebuilt in the 18th century. On a tithe map of 1837, Pentwyn is recorded as being in the ownership of a Thomas James, and being farmed with 161 acres by a Mattias Goff. The 1895 Kelly's Directory for Monmouthshire records an Evans Francis as being resident.

The architectural historian John Newman describes Pentwyn as "conspicuously sited on a hillock overlooking the River Usk. The farmhouse is of 2 storeys and the entrance front dates from the Georgian remodelling. Fox and Raglan, and Newman, note the early use of stone mullioned windows, Fox and Raglan assigning the farmhouse to their "exotic" grouping of Monmouthshire houses on this basis. Pentwyn has a Grade II* listing, its listing describing it as "a Georgian reconstruction of an important 16th century house", while the 18th century barn has a Grade II listing.

== Sources ==
- Fox, Cyril; Raglan, Lord (1994). Sub-Medieval Houses, c. 1550–1610. Monmouthshire Houses. Vol. 2. Cardiff: Merton Priory Press Ltd & The National Museum of Wales. ISBN 0952000989. OCLC 277251975.
- Newman, John (2000). Gwent/Monmouthshire. The Buildings of Wales. London: Penguin. ISBN 0-14-071053-1.
