= Pen-y-cae-mawr =

Coordinates: 51.650915°N 2.852849°W

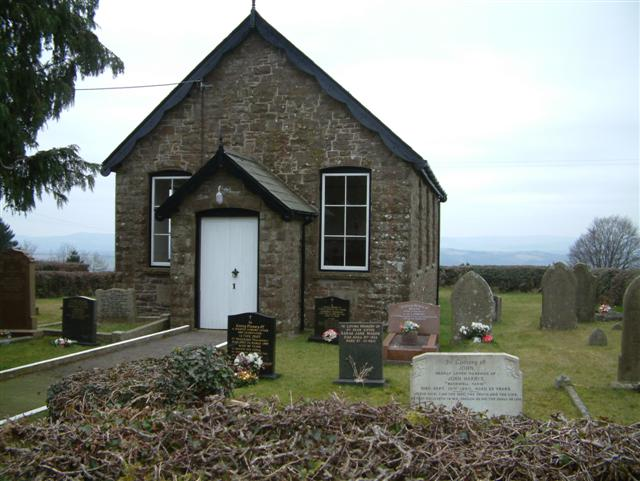
- The Methodist Chapel

- Location within Monmouthshire
- Principal area: Monmouthshire
- Preserved county: Gwent
- Country: Wales
- Sovereign state: United Kingdom
- Post town: Usk
- Postcode district: NP15
- Dialling code: 01633; Llanwern and Penhow exchanges
- Police: Gwent
- Fire: South Wales
- Ambulance: Welsh
- UK Parliament: Monmouth
- Senedd Cymru – Welsh Parliament: Monmouth

Pen-y-cae-mawr is a small hamlet of two farms, Cas-Troggy and Penyrheo, above the Wentwood Forest in Monmouthshire, Wales. It lies about 2 miles (3.2 km) east of Llantrisant.

There is a Methodist chapel on the main road, which celebrated its 121st anniversary in 2013. There are also the remains of a Baptist Chapel, known as "Pen Y Well", the churchyard for which has gravestones from the 18th century.
