= Pengold =

Hamlet in Cornwall, England

Coordinates: 50.719°N 4.641°W

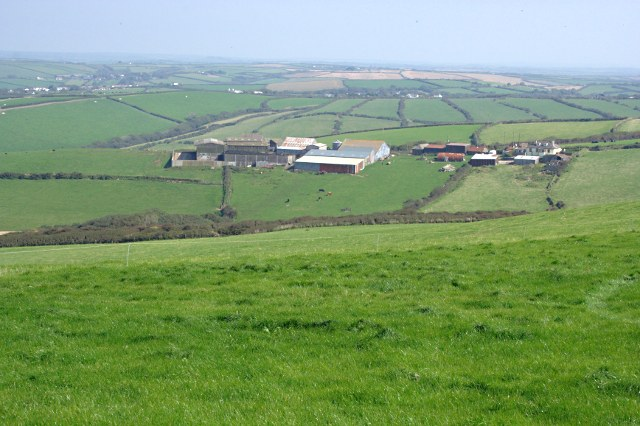
Pengold Farm

Pengold is a hamlet near St Gennys in Cornwall, England, UK. Pengold is southwest of Higher Crackington.
