= Pen-allt =

Village in Herefordshire, England

Coordinates: 51.9627°N 2.6265°W

Pen-allt is a village within the parish of King's Caple in Herefordshire, England.
