= Pentrellwyn =

Village in Ceredigion, Wales

Coordinates: 52.059036°N 4.318238°W

- Location within Ceredigion
- OS grid reference: SN 4116 4261
  - Cardiff: 63.1 mi (101.5 km)
  - London: 183.1 mi (294.7 km)
- Community: Llandysul
- Principal area: Ceredigion
- Country: Wales
- Sovereign state: United Kingdom
- Post town: Llandysul
- Postcode district: SA44
- Police: Dyfed-Powys
- Fire: Mid and West Wales
- Ambulance: Welsh
- UK Parliament: Ceredigion Preseli
- Senedd Cymru – Welsh Parliament: Ceredigion

Pentrellwyn is a small village in the community of Llandysul, Ceredigion, Wales. Pentrellwyn is represented in the Senedd by Elin Jones (Plaid Cymru) and is part of the Ceredigion Preseli constituency in the House of Commons.
