= Penweathers =

Coordinates: 50.25483°N 5.07912°W

- Location within Cornwall
- OS grid reference: SW801438
- Civil parish: Kea
- Shire county: Cornwall
- Region: South West
- Country: England
- Sovereign state: United Kingdom
- Postcode district: TR3
- Police: Devon and Cornwall
- Fire: Cornwall
- Ambulance: South Western

Penweathers is a hamlet in west Cornwall, England, United Kingdom. It is approximately one mile (1.6 km) west of Truro city centre.

The West Cornwall Railway opened the Penwithers railway viaduct on 17 December 1887. Constructed of granite from the quarries at Carn Brea. It consists of seven arches with a total length of 420 feet (130 m). With a uniform width of 24 feet (7.3 m), it was designed for a possible upgrade to two lines, if needed in the future.

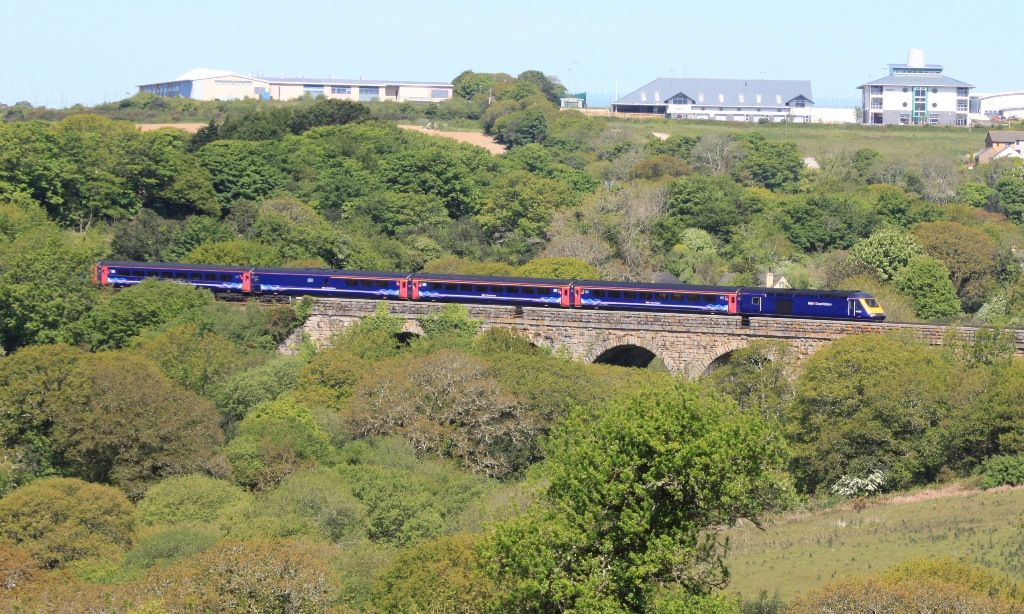
Penwithers viaduct

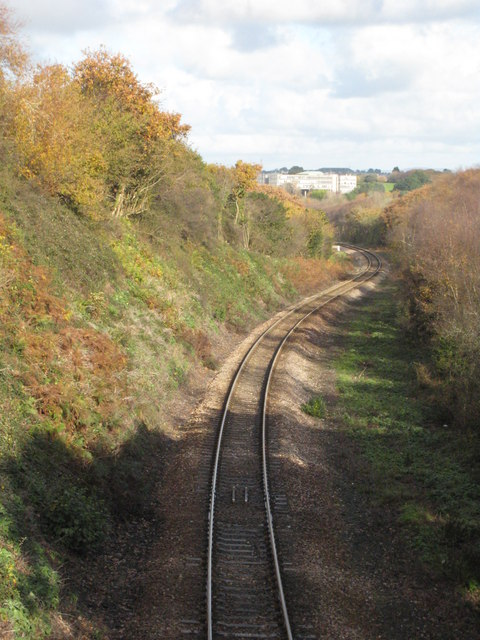
The Truro to Falmouth branch railway line at Penweathers

== See also ==
- Carrine Common & Penwethers
