= Penbeagle =

Area of St Ives, Cornwall, England

Coordinates: 50.206°N 5.495°W

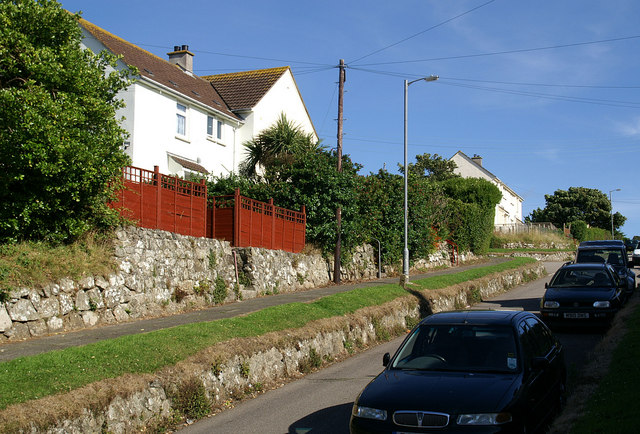
Corva Road, Penbeagle

Penbeagle (Cornish: Pennbegel, meaning "top of the hillock") is a suburb of St Ives in Cornwall, England, UK.

There is a Cornish cross at Penbeagle, bearing an incised Latin cross.
