= Penny Hill (musician) =

American singer-songwriter

Background information
- Born: Norman, Oklahoma, U.S.
- Genres: Folk rock, indie
- Occupation(s): Musician, songwriter
- Instrument(s): Vocals, guitar
- Years active: 2009–present
- Website: www.pennyhillplays.com

Penny Hill is an American songwriter, musician, and singer, from Norman, Oklahoma. She is currently recording her second album. She performs as Penny Hill Party while performing with a full backing band. She has previously performed as a back-up musician for Samantha Crain & Black Canyon and currently plays bass in Low Litas from Tulsa, OK. She has toured with the likes of Peninsula, Blue Valley Farmer, Elephant Revival, Brother Gruesome, and Ghost of Monkshood.

== Discography ==
Studio Albums

- 2010 Unbutton Your Heart
- 2011 TBA

Extended Plays

- 2010 (Rough and Unreleased) Homemade Recordings
