= Penwartha Coombe =

Hamlet in Cornwall, England

Coordinates: 50°19′51″N 5°08′55″W

Penwartha Coombe is a hamlet south of Perranporth, Cornwall, England.
