= Penwood =

Village in Hampshire, England

Coordinates: 51.352380°N 1.358271°W

- Location within Hampshire
- OS grid reference: SU4478661674
- District: Basingstoke and Deane
- Shire county: Hampshire
- Region: South East
- Country: England
- Sovereign state: United Kingdom
- Post town: Newbury
- Postcode district: RG20 9
- Police: Hampshire and Isle of Wight
- Fire: Hampshire and Isle of Wight
- Ambulance: South Central
- UK Parliament: Basingstoke

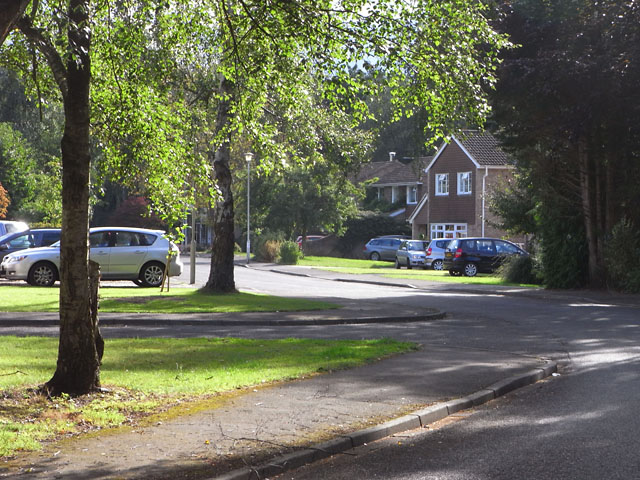

Penwood is a village in the civil parish of Highclere in the Basingstoke and Deane district of Hampshire, England. Its nearest town is Newbury, which lies approximately 4.1 miles (6.4 km) north-east from the village.
