= Penrhyd Lastra =

Coordinates: 53.402271°N 4.363687°W

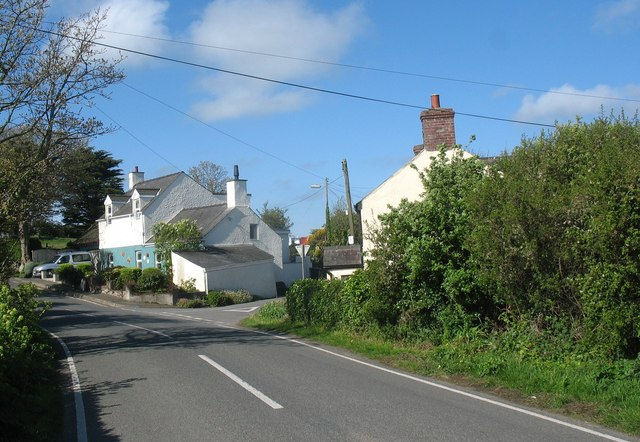

- Location within Anglesey
- OS grid reference: SH 4295 9210
  - Cardiff: 141.9 mi (228.4 km)
  - London: 221.2 mi (356.0 km)
- Community: Amlwch
- Principal area: Anglesey
- Country: Wales
- Sovereign state: United Kingdom
- Post town: Amlwch
- Police: North Wales
- Fire: North Wales
- Ambulance: Welsh
- UK Parliament: Ynys Môn
- Senedd Cymru – Welsh Parliament: Ynys Môn

Penrhyd Lastra is a hamlet in the community of Amlwch, Anglesey, Wales.

== See also ==
- List of localities in Wales by population
