= Pennance =

Hamlet in Cornwall, England

Coordinates: 50.220°N 5.216°W

- Location within Cornwall
- Unitary authority: Cornwall
- Ceremonial county: Cornwall
- Region: South West
- Country: England
- Sovereign state: United Kingdom
- Police: Devon and Cornwall
- Fire: Cornwall
- Ambulance: South Western

Pennance is a hamlet near Lanner in west Cornwall, England.

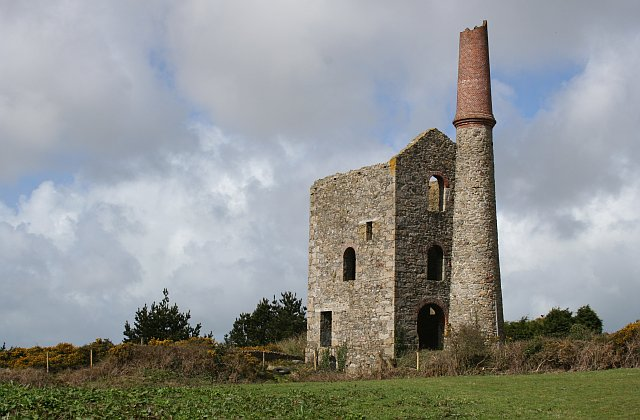
Baronet's Engine House, Pennance Consols

== Pennance Mine ==
Pennance Mine is located on the southern slopes of Carn Marth, in the Gwennap Mining District. Tinners had worked in the area since as early as the 17th century. It was previously known as Wheal Amelia. According to Henry De la Beche, in his 1839 book Report on the Geology of Cornwall, it produced copper. This was corroborated by Robert Hunt in his 1857 report the Mineral Statistics of the United Kingdom of Great Britain. Copper was produced until about 1873, in which year its output was 147 tons of medium grade ore.
