= Pennytinney =

Hamlet in Cornwall, England

Coordinates: 50.566°N 4.799°W

Pennytinney is a hamlet in the parish of St Kew, Cornwall, England, UK.
