= Pengover Green =

Hamlet in Cornwall, England

Coordinates: 50°27′41″N 4°25′24″W

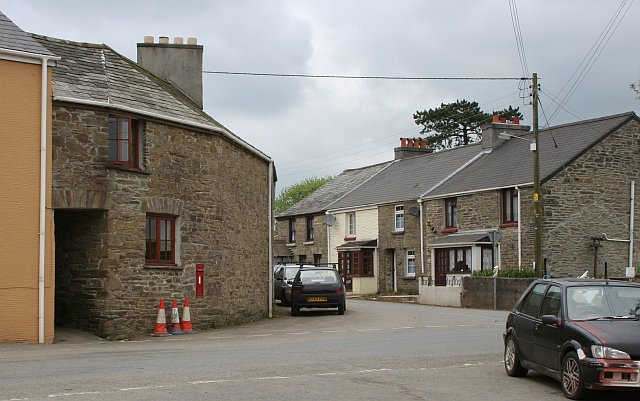
Pengover Green

Pengover Green is a hamlet east of Liskeard in east Cornwall, England.

== Local Industry ==
Local abattoir, Peake (GB) Limited is situated 900m southwest of the hamlet.
