= Snooth =

American social networking website

Snooth Inc
- Type: Private
- Industry: Internet
- Founded: New York City, New York (November 17, 2006)
- Headquarters: New York City, New York

Snooth is a defunct (as of 2023) social networking website based in New York City, United States. It was founded in November 2006 by Philip J. K. James, a graduate of Oxford University and Columbia Business School. The company raised $300,000 in seed financing in December 2006.

== Awards ==
In 2008, Snooth receives the Model of Excellence Award from infoCommerce.

In 2010, Snooth became a 2010 Wine Blog Awards Finalist.

== History ==
The site has been noted in Decanter (magazine), the New York Daily News, and the New York Post.

In November 2007, the company raised another $1 million from angel investors to expand its operations and merchant relationships.
