= Weyhill =

Village and parish in Hampshire, England

Coordinates: 51°13′01″N 1°32′46″W

- Village
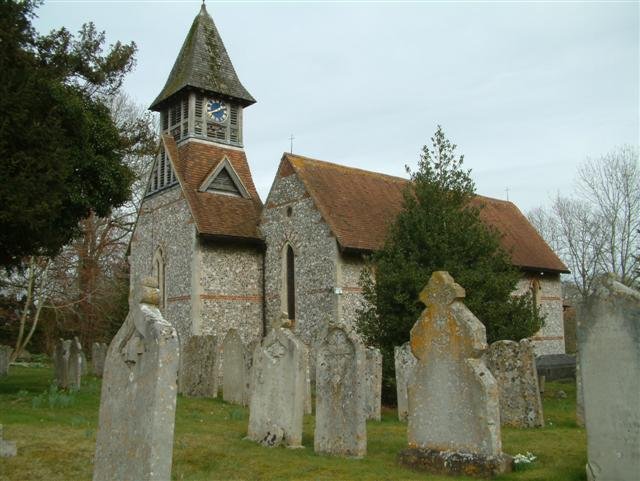
- Weyhill Church

- Location within Hampshire
- Population: 794
- OS grid reference: SU3146
- Civil parish: Penton Grafton
- District: Test Valley
- Shire county: Hampshire
- Region: South East
- Country: England
- Sovereign state: United Kingdom
- Post town: Andover
- Postcode district: SP11
- Dialling code: 01264
- Police: Hampshire and Isle of Wight
- Fire: Hampshire and Isle of Wight
- Ambulance: South Central
- UK Parliament: North West Hampshire

Weyhill is a village, 2.5 miles (3.8 km) west of Andover, Hampshire. It sits within the civil parish of Penton Grafton, which includes the village of the same name. The village is famous for having a medieval fair and then later a livestock fair, with up to 100,000 sheep a day being auctioned. The fair owed its existence to Weyhill being positioned on 8 ancient trackways, including the Harrow Way.

== History ==
The Church of St Michael and all the Angels dates back in part to the Norman period, with a 16th-century nave. It is on the site of an earlier Saxon church, itself possibly a successor to a pagan temple in Roman times, being close to the Roman road. It is a Grade II* listed building

The fair has been held on the site since the 11th century, with the first written records from 1225. By the mid-19th century the fair had stopped attracting large crowds, as communications and business changed, reducing the variety of items for sale. The last fair happened in 1957. The parish council bought the fairground after it fell into disrepair and converted it into small independent craft studios and shops in 2005.

== Communications ==
Weyhill railway station was opened on 1 May 1882, by The Swindon, Marlborough and Andover Railway, and closed on 11 September 1961. The village is just north of the A303 dual carriageway. The A342 Andover to Devizes road runs through the town.

== Attractions ==
Nearby attractions are Thruxton aerodrome and motor racing circuit to the west and the Hawk Conservancy Trust just south of the A303.

== Popular culture ==
The historic Weyhill fairground was the site used by Thomas Hardy in his book The Mayor of Casterbridge where Michael Henchard sells his wife. Hardy called it Weydon Priors.

== Gallery ==
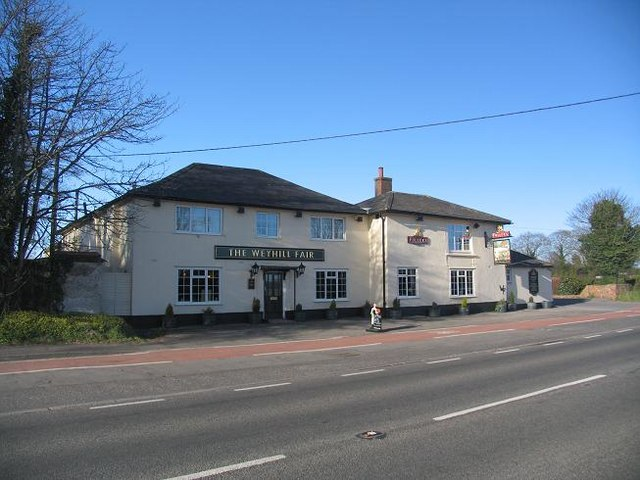
The Weyhill Fair pub

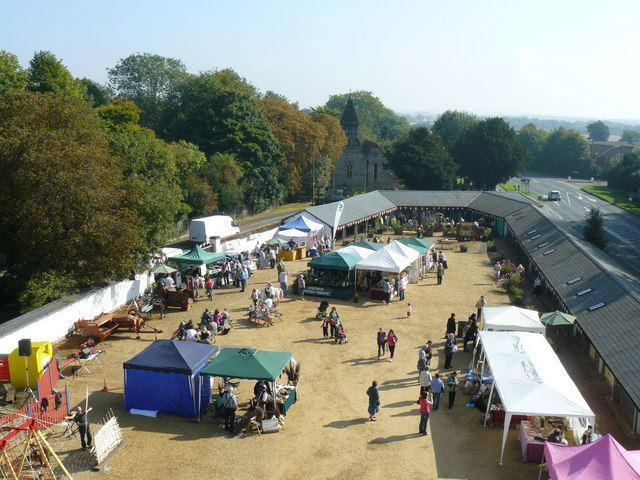
The Weyhill fairground

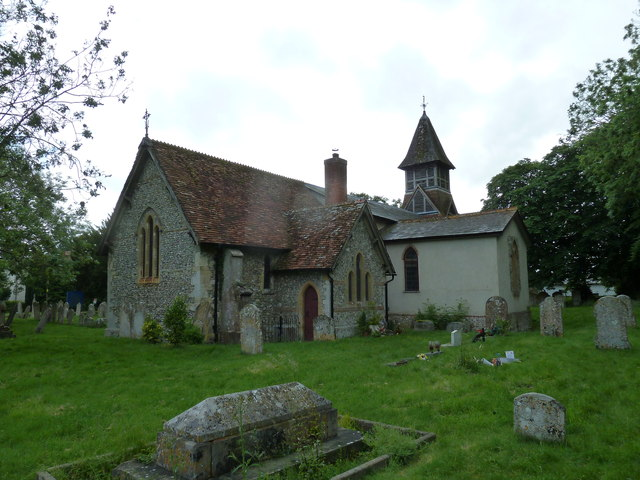
St Michael & All Angels Church

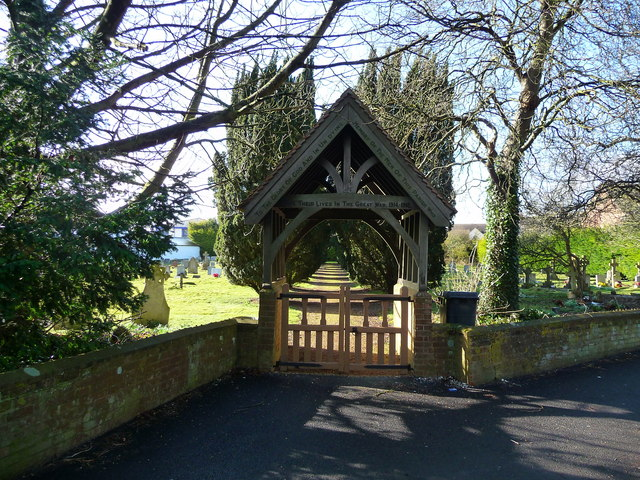
War Memorial gate, entrance to Church
