= Penpont, Cornwall =

Hamlet in Cornwall, England

Coordinates: 50.537°N 4.702°W

Penpont is a hamlet in the parish of St Breward, in north Cornwall, England, UK, in the Camel Valley.

There is also a place called Penpont near Wadebridge. The meaning of Penpont is "end of the bridge".
