= Penhalvean =

Hamlet in Cornwall, England

Coordinates: 50°11′37″N 5°12′37″W

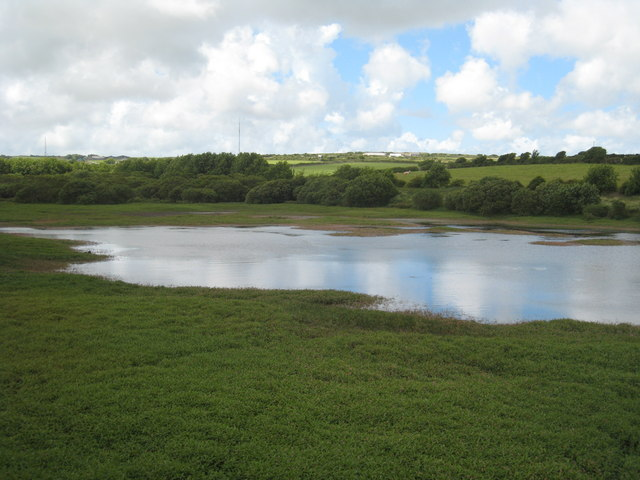
Stithians Reservoir at Penhalvean

Penhalvean (Cornish: Pennhal Vian) is a hamlet in the civil parish of Stithians in Cornwall, England, UK.
