= Penybont, Ceredigion =

Village in Ceredigion, Wales

Coordinates: 52.474229°N 4.026215°W

Penybont
- Location within Ceredigion
- OS grid reference: SN 6247 8819
  - Cardiff: 77.6 mi (124.9 km)
  - London: 178.8 mi (287.8 km)
- Community: Genau'r-glyn
- Principal area: Ceredigion
- Country: Wales
- Sovereign state: United Kingdom
- Post town: Borth
- Postcode district: SY24
- Police: Dyfed-Powys
- Fire: Mid and West Wales
- Ambulance: Welsh
- UK Parliament: Ceredigion Preseli
- Senedd Cymru – Welsh Parliament: Ceredigion Penfro

Penybont is a small village in the community of Genau'r-glyn, Ceredigion, Wales, which is 77.6 miles (124.9 km) from Cardiff and 178.8 miles (287.7 km) from London. Penybont is represented in the Senedd by Elin Jones (Plaid Cymru) and is part of the Ceredigion Preseli constituency in the House of Commons.

== Etymology ==
The name Penybont derives from the Welsh language and means "Bridge's head".

== See also ==
- List of localities in Wales by population
