= Pen-y-graig =

Pen-y-graig (Welsh for lit. 'Head of the rock') may refer to one of these places in Wales:

- Pen-y-graig (electoral ward), electoral ward in Rhondda Cynon Taf
- Penygraig, village and community in Rhondda Cynon Taf
- Pen-y-graig, Carmarthenshire, area of Llanelli, Carmarthenshire
- Pen-y-graig, Gwynedd, village in Gwynedd
- Pen-y-graig-goch, SSSI in Carmarthenshire
- Creigiau Pen y Graig, SSSI in Ceredigion
- Ffridd Pen-y-Graig, hill in Powys
- Pen-y-Graig-fawr, hill in Powys
- Mynydd Pen-y-graig, hill in Rhondda Cynon Taf

== See also ==
- Penygraigwen, village in Anglesey
- Pencraig (disambiguation)
