= Pentrefelin, Ceredigion =

Village in Ceredigion, Wales

Coordinates: 52.121304°N 4.029574°W

Pentrefelin
- Location within Ceredigion
- OS grid reference: SN 6114 4894
  - Cardiff: 57.3 mi (92.2 km)
  - London: 171.9 mi (276.6 km)
- Community: Llanfair Clydogau
- Principal area: Ceredigion
- Country: Wales
- Sovereign state: United Kingdom
- Post town: Aberaeron
- Postcode district: SA48
- Police: Dyfed-Powys
- Fire: Mid and West Wales
- Ambulance: Welsh
- UK Parliament: Ceredigion Preseli
- Senedd Cymru – Welsh Parliament: Ceredigion

Pentrefelin is a hamlet in the community of Llanfair Clydogau, Ceredigion, Wales, which is 57.3 miles (92.3 km) from Cardiff and 171.9 miles (276.7 km) from London. Pentrefelin is represented in the Senedd by Elin Jones (Plaid Cymru) and is part of the Ceredigion Preseli constituency in the House of Commons.

== See also ==
- List of localities in Wales by population
