= Penton Mewsey =

Village and parish in Hampshire, England

Coordinates: 51.2247°N 1.5280°W

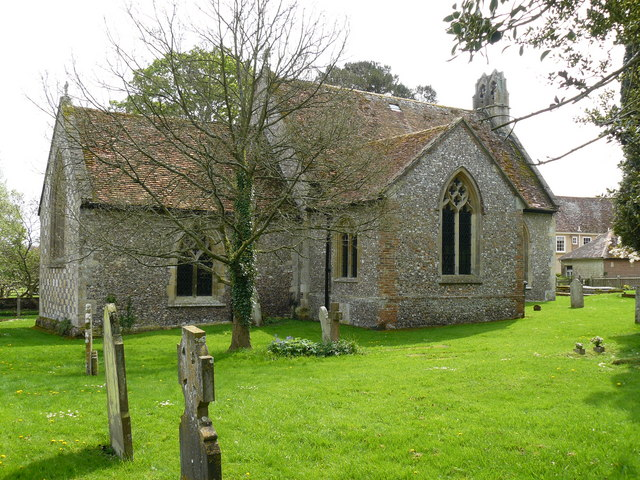
- Penton Mewsey – Holy Trinity Church

- Location within Hampshire
- Population: 412 (census 2011)
- OS grid reference: SU329474
- Civil parish: Penton Mewsey
- District: Test Valley
- Shire county: Hampshire
- Region: South East
- Country: England
- Sovereign state: United Kingdom
- Post town: ANDOVER
- Postcode district: SP11
- Dialling code: 01264
- Police: Hampshire and Isle of Wight
- Fire: Hampshire and Isle of Wight
- Ambulance: South Central
- UK Parliament: North West Hampshire

Penton Mewsey is a village and civil parish in Hampshire, England. It is located 2 miles (3.2 km) north-west of Andover.

The village is home to approximately 400 people and has about 110 houses. The name Penton is derived from Penitone, which is a farm held at penny rent. The village is adjacent to the hamlet and parish of Penton Grafton. Both villages are collectively known as The Pentons.

Until the 1920s the Pentons were mainly agricultural communities supporting sheep and corn, typical of northern Hampshire at the time. The Pentons are still surrounded by farmland which is currently completely arable. Today, three stables provide the main village-based commercial activities. The Holy Trinity church dates from the 14th century, although it was refurbished extensively in the 19th century.

It is also the current home of Sir George Young.
