= Penton Grafton =

Village and parish in Hampshire, England

Coordinates: 51.224047°N 1.527901°W

- Location within Hampshire
- Population: 794 (2011 Census including Ramridge Park)
- OS grid reference: SU3306547312
- Civil parish: Penton Grafton
- District: Test Valley
- Shire county: Hampshire
- Region: South East
- Country: England
- Sovereign state: United Kingdom
- Post town: ANDOVER
- Postcode district: SP11
- Dialling code: 01264
- Police: Hampshire and Isle of Wight
- Fire: Hampshire and Isle of Wight
- Ambulance: South Central
- UK Parliament: North West Hampshire

Penton Grafton is a village and civil parish in the Test Valley district of Hampshire, England. It is adjacent to the village and parish of Penton Mewsey. Both villages are collectively known as The Pentons.

The town of Andover is approximately 2 miles (3 km) south-east from the village.

The village of Weyhill is included in the civil parish's boundaries.
