= Penrose Hill =

Hamlet in Cornwall, England

Coordinates: 50.086°N 5.302°W

Penrose Hill is a hamlet near Porthleven, Cornwall, England, UK.
