= FirstMark Capital =

American venture capital firm

FirstMark
- Type: Private
- Industry: Venture Capital
- Founded: June 30, 2005; 21 years ago
- Founders: Rick Heitzmann; Amish Jani
- Headquarters: New York City, New York, United States
- Key people: Rick Heitzmann; Amish Jani; Matt Turck; Adam Nelson; Arnav Bimbhet; David Waltcher; Shilpa Nayyar
- Products: Venture capital
- Total assets: $3.5 billion
- Number of employees: 30
- Website: Official website

FirstMark is a venture capital firm based in New York City. FirstMark invests in early-stage technology companies, frequently as the first institutional investor and leading the rounds it participates in. Notable investments include Pinterest, Shopify, DraftKings, Stubhub, Airbnb, Upwork, Riot Games, and Frame.io.

== History ==
FirstMark was founded in 2008 by Amish Jani and Rick Heitzmann. The co-founders started the firm based on their core belief that New York was set to become the dominant global hub for technology startups.

Since inception, FirstMark has raised 10 funds with dedicated funds for both early- and growth-stage investments. As of 2024, the firm has $3.5B in committed capital.

== Team ==
As of 2024, the firm has four investing partners: Rick Heitzmann, Amish Jani, Matt Turck, and Adam Nelson. Rick Heitzmann has been named to the Forbes Midas List for five consecutive years, and Amish Jani has been twice recognized as one of the top 100 seed investors by Business Insider, with similar honors from the New York Times and CB Insights.

== Notable Investments ==
The firm's most notable investments include Pinterest, which debuted on New York Stock Exchange on April 18, 2019, as well as Shopify, which debuted on the New York Stock Exchange on May 21, 2015. Other prominent investments include Draftkings, Riot Games, creator of League of Legends (Acquired by Tencent Holdings), Frame.io (Acquired by Adobe), Airbnb, Stubhub, Upwork, Postmates (Acquired by Uber), and EvolutionIQ (Acquired by CCC).

== Model ==
FirstMark has a heavy presence in New York City, and invests primarily in Seed and Series A companies based on the East Coast and in Europe. The firm invests in areas where they have strong domain expertise, including: enterprise software, consumer marketplaces, infrastructure, AI/ML, healthcare, gaming, fintech, and e-commerce.

== Platform ==
FirstMark is a network-driven firm, built around communities with networks that give it access to the companies, entrepreneurs and advisors in the technology ecosystem. FirstMark's Platform comes to life through peer networks, full lifecycle recruiting, and customer and partner development.

Notably, Guilds by FirstMark is a collection of invite-only communities FirstMark runs for C-level executives that currently counts over 2,700 members representing over 60% of global tech unicorns. These communities provide FirstMark portfolio companies "unfair access" to a network of peers, 100+ annual company-building events, and more.

FirstMark is also known for its flagship events, including their annual CEO Summit & Founder Dinner (which takes place at the New York Stock Exchange and welcomes 250 Founders & Venture Capitalists), CloudNY (which welcomes 150 cloud CEOs to hear from legendary tech founders and CEOs), and Data Driven NYC (a 20,000-person AI/ML community that has been running for more than a decade and has featured leading AI researches, founders, and investors).
