= 1983 Nobel Prize in Literature =

- William Golding
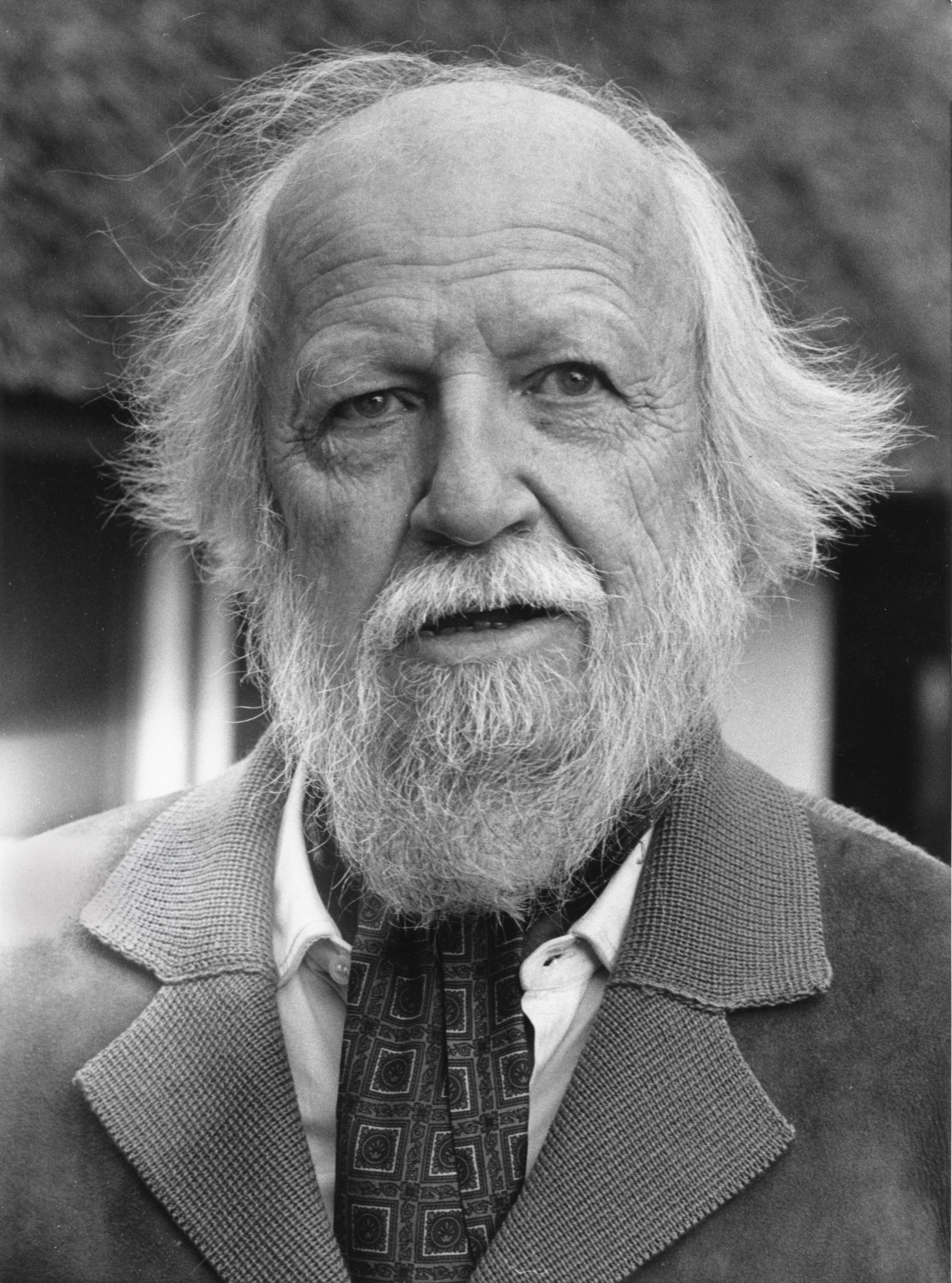
- "for his novels which, with the perspicuity of realistic narrative art and the diversity and universality of myth, illuminate the human condition in the world of today"
- Date: 6 October 1983 (announcement); 10 December 1983 (ceremony)
- Location: Stockholm, Sweden
- Presented by: Swedish Academy
- First award: 1901
- Website: Official website

The 1983 Nobel Prize in Literature was awarded to the British author William Golding (1911–1993) "for his novels which, with the perspicuity of realistic narrative art and the diversity and universality of myth, illuminate the human condition in the world of today".

== Laureate ==
William Golding's works are regarded as parables of the human condition. His first novel, Lord of the Flies, was published in 1954. Other notable works include The Inheritors (1955), Pincher Martin (1956), Free Fall (1959), The Spire (1964), Darkness Visible (1979) and Rites of Passage (1980).

== Deliberations ==
William Golding had been shortlisted by the Nobel committee ten years earlier, in 1973, as one of the final six contenders for the prize that year.

In 1983, William Golding and Claude Simon were the main candidates for the prize. An anonymous source in the Swedish Academy revealed that two rounds of voting were required before Golding narrowly received the majority of the votes.

Committee member Artur Lundkvist advocated a prize to the Senegalese poet Léopold Sédar Senghor, but winning little support for the proposal in the Nobel committee Lundkvist then supported Claude Simon's candidacy. Lundkvist also revealed that he favoured Anthony Burgess over the other British candidates Graham Greene and Golding.

== Reactions ==
The choice of William Golding as the Nobel Prize laureate surprised many observers. Golding was not among the favourites in speculations for the prize, as Graham Greene and Anthony Burgess were regarded as the leading British contenders at the time. Other frequently-mentioned candidates for the prize in 1983 were Nadine Gordimer (awarded in 1991), Joyce Carol Oates, Marguerite Yourcenar, René Char, Henri Michaux, Wole Soyinka (awarded in 1986) and Ba Jin.

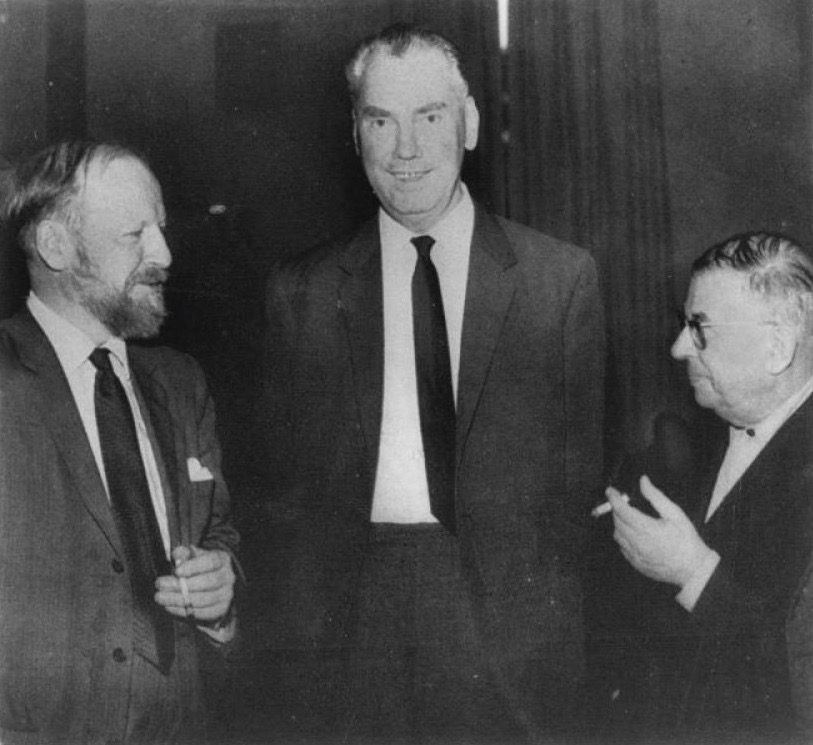
William Golding (left), Artur Lundkvist (center) and the 1964 Nobel winner Jean-Paul Sartre at a writers' congress in Leningrad, USSR, 1963.

Unconventionally, a member of the Swedish Academy voiced his discontent with the choice of the laureate. Nobel committee member Artur Lundkvist, who favoured the Senegalese poet Léopold Sédar Senghor and French novelist Claude Simon (awarded in 1985), said that Golding "was decent but hardly in the Nobel Prize class", and publicly accused the Academy's permanent secretary Lars Gyllensten of orchestrating a "coup" within the Academy, claiming to have been excluded from the second voting when Golding received the majority of the votes. Lundkvist further added that Golding was a "a small English phenomenon of no great interest." Following Lundkvist's public remarks, a member of the Swedish Academy, Knut Ahnlund, sent William Golding a confidential letter telling him that the Academy's prize decisions were rarely unanimous and assuring him that he had won the voting by a margin that was above the average margin between two close contenders.

Academy member Lars Forssell revealed that William Golding had been a candidate for three years and acknowledged that the decision to award Golding the prize was likely to raise questions as to why the frequently-favoured Graham Greene was not selected. "Greene should have won it in the '50s", Forssell said, but it was widely known that both Artur Lundkvist and Lars Gyllensten opposed awarding the prize to Greene.

Swedish commentators included Arne Ruth, chief editor of the newspaper Dagens Nyheter, who concluded that the selection of Golding meant that Graham Greene would never win the prize, predicting that the Swedish Academy would move on to other nations' literatures. "I don't think it's one of the really bad choices", Ruth said, "There have been worse. There is no consensus that he is a terrible writer". Ingemar Björksten, literary editor of Svenska Dagbladet, was surprised, saying that William Golding had "not entered the public discussion of possible or necessary Nobel Prize winners", but in choosing "a dark horse", Björksten said, the Academy appeared to want to single out a popular and readable storyteller, likening it to the choice of Isaac Bashevis Singer in 1978.

== Award ceremony speech ==
In the award ceremony speech on 10 December 1983, Lars Gyllensten of the Swedish Academy said of William Golding's writing:

"William Golding's novels and stories are not only sombre moralities and dark myths about evil and about treacherous, destructive forces. As already mentioned they are also colourful tales of adventure which can be read as such, full of narrative joy, inventiveness and excitement. In addition there are plentiful streaks of humour, biting irony, comedy and drastic jesting. There is a vitality which breaks through what is tragic and misanthropic, frightening in fact. A vitality, a vigour, which is infectious owing to its strength and intractability and to the paradoxical freedom it possesses as against what is related. His fabled world is tragic and pathetic, yet not overwhelming and depressing. There is a life which is mightier than life's conditions."
