= Topping out =

Builders' rite when the last beam (or equivalent) is placed

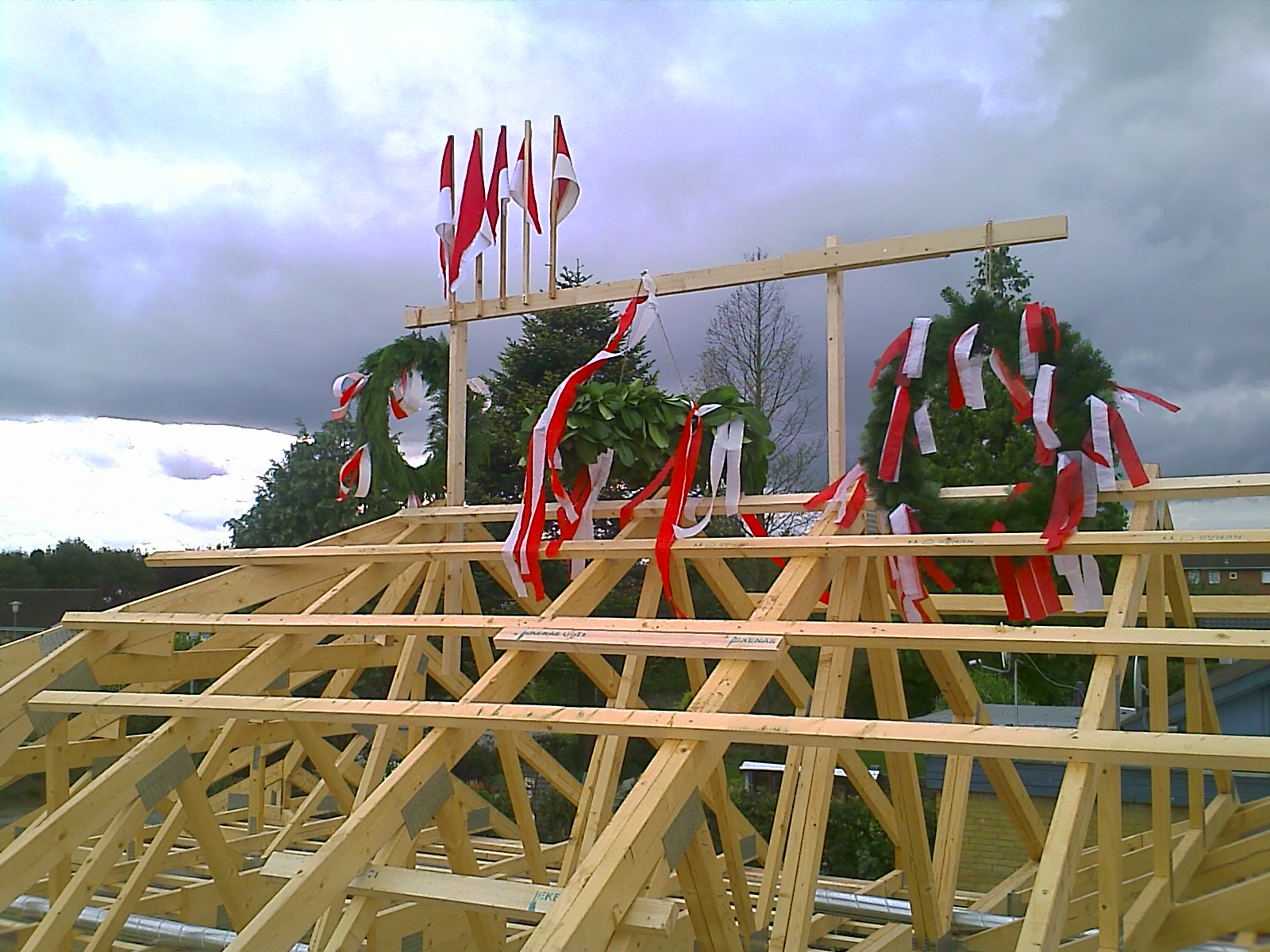
Topping out in southern Denmark

In building construction, topping out (also referred to as topping off or roofing ceremony) is a builders' rite traditionally held when the last beam (or its equivalent) is placed at the top of a structure during its construction. From the late twentieth century, the ceremony has often been parlayed into a media event for public relations purposes. It has since come to mean more generally finishing the structure of the building, whether there is a ceremony or not. It is also commonly used to determine the amount of wind on the top of the structure.

== History ==
The practice of "topping out" a new building can be traced to the ancient Scandinavian religious rite of placing a tree atop a new building to appease the tree-dwelling spirits displaced in its construction. Long an important component of timber frame building, it migrated initially to England and Northern Europe, then to the Americas.

A tree or leafy branch is placed on the topmost wood or iron beam, often with flags and streamers tied to it. A toast is usually drunk and sometimes workers are treated to a meal. In masonry construction the rite celebrates the bedding of the last block or brick.

In some cases a topping out event is held at an intermediate point, such as when the roof is dried-in, which means the roof can provide at least semi-permanent protection from the elements.

The practice remains common in the United Kingdom and assorted Commonwealth countries such as Australia and Canada, as well as Germany, Austria, Slovenia, Iceland, Chile, Czech Republic, Slovakia, Poland, Hungary and the Baltic States. In the United States the last beam of a skyscraper is often painted white and signed by all the workers involved. In New Zealand, completion of the roof to a water-proof state is celebrated through a "roof shout", where workers are treated to cake and beer.

The tradition of "pannenbier" (literally "(roof) tile beer" in Dutch) is popular in the Netherlands and Flanders, where a national, regional or city flag is hung once the highest point of a building is reached. It stays in place until the building's owner provides free beer to the workers, after which it is lowered. Since the workers are treated to free beer as long as the flag is raised, the workers are considered greedy if they fly the flag for more than a few days.

== Gallery ==
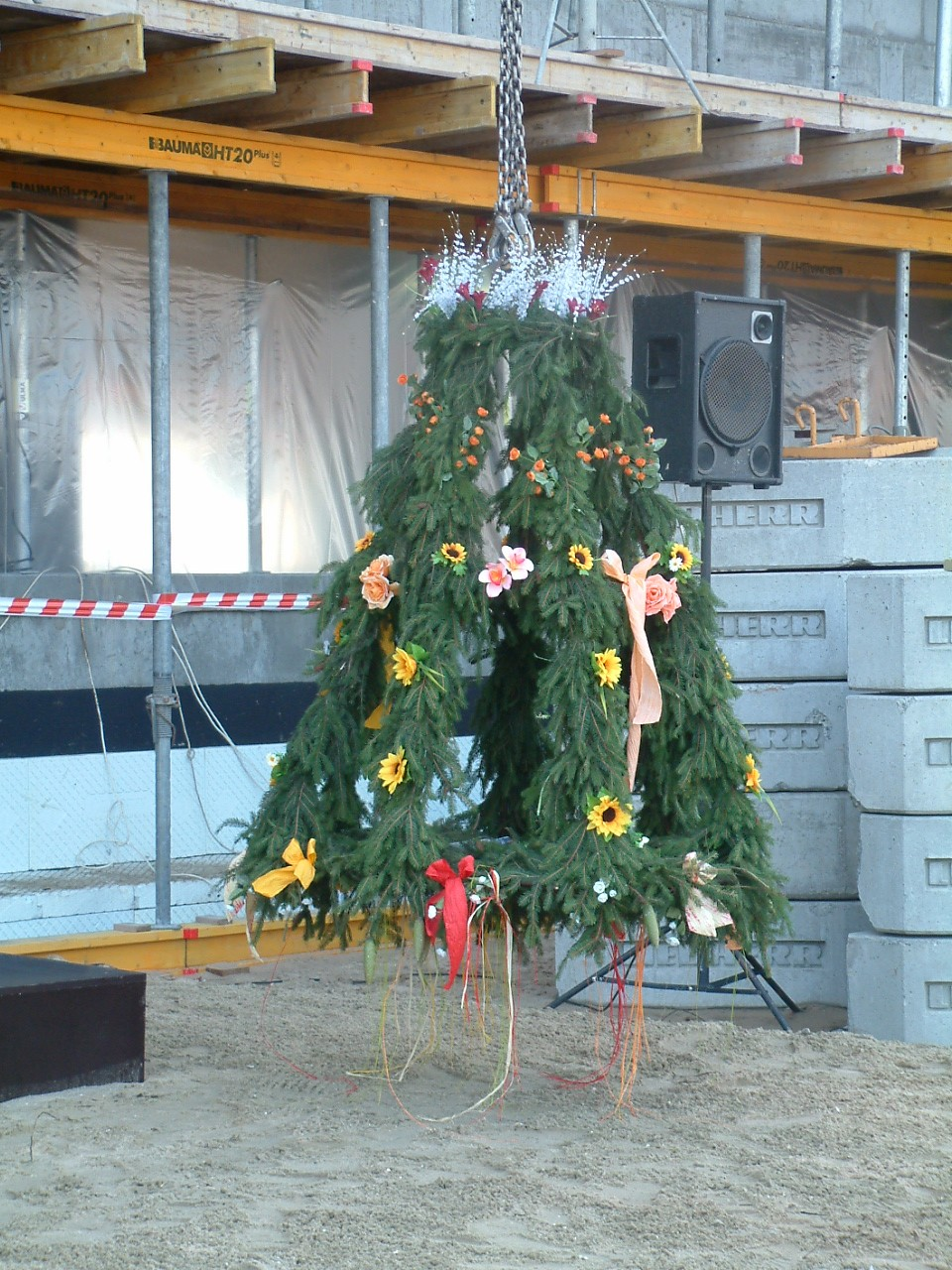
Topping out (wiecha) in Poland

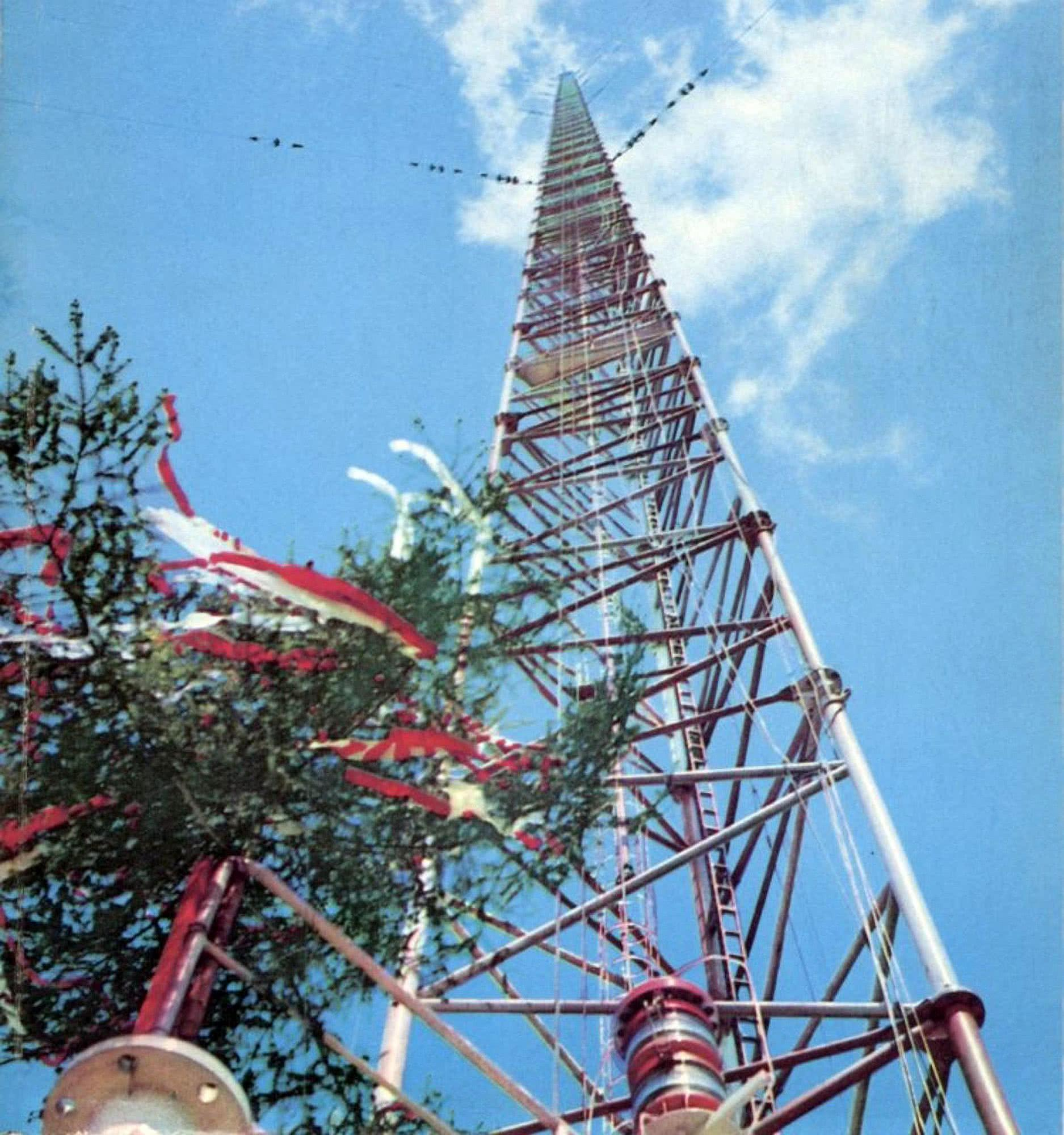
The final section of the Warsaw radio mast (in foreground) is decorated and ready to raise

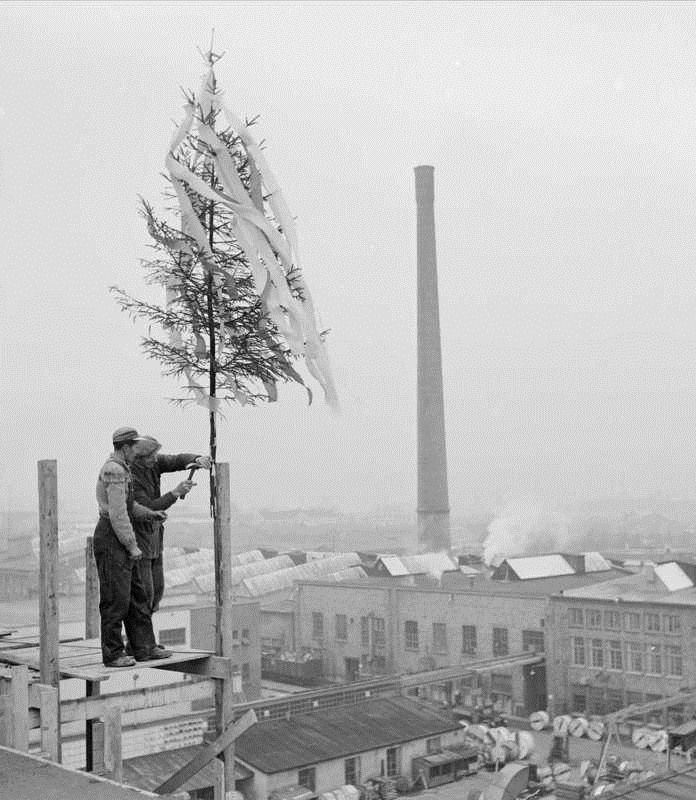
Topping out in Norway (1959)

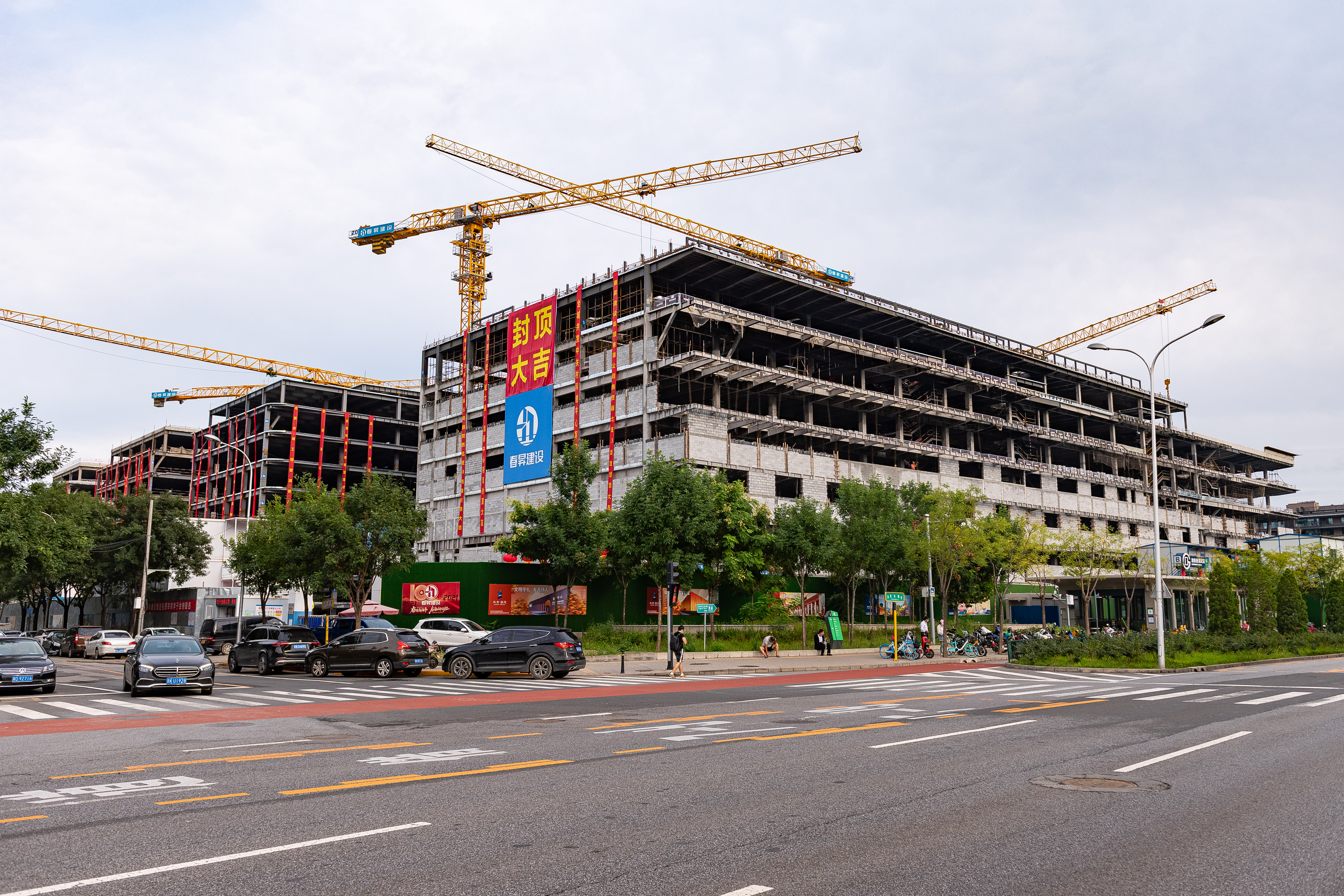
Topping out of Xibeiwang MIXC in Beijing, China with celebration banners (2021)

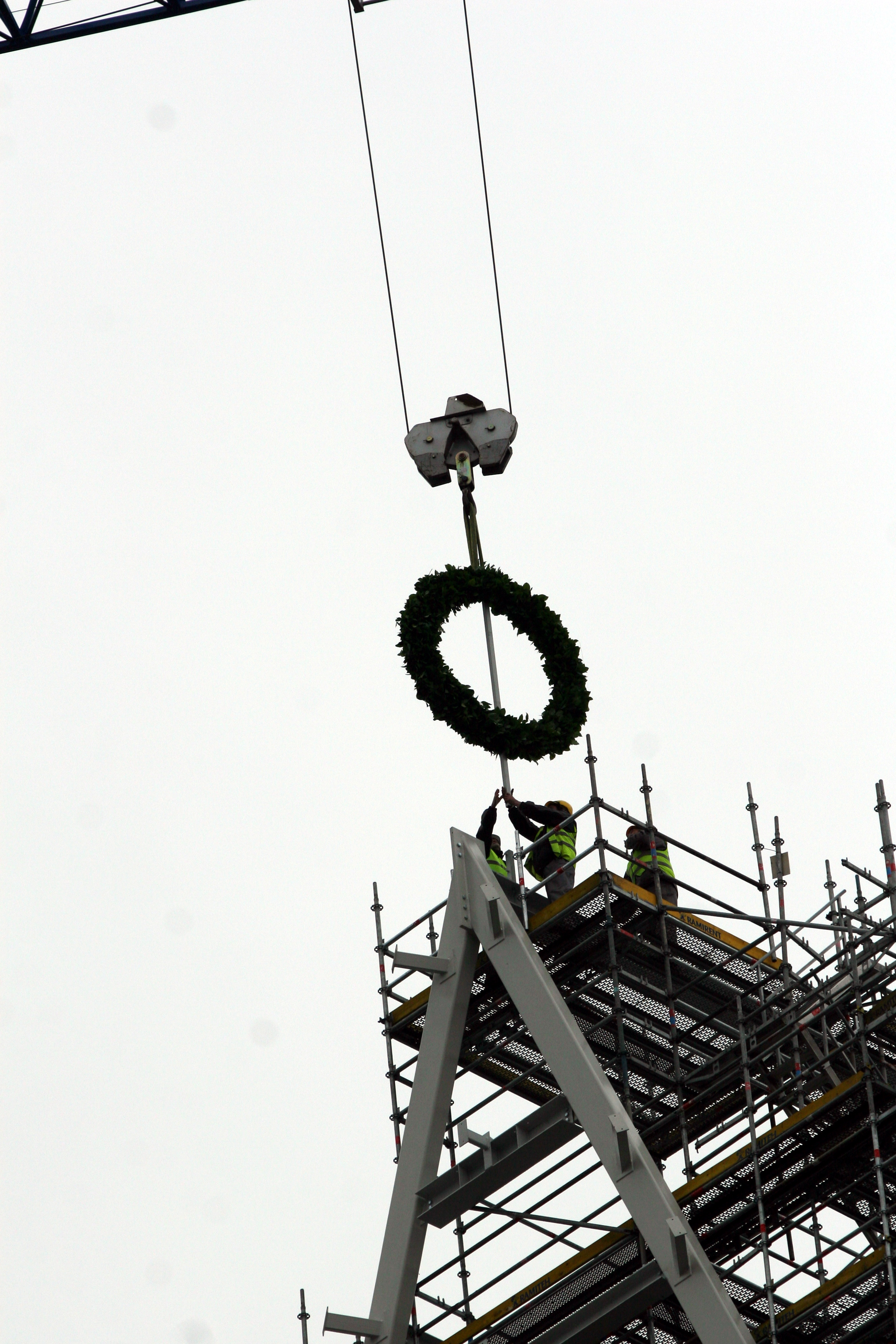
Topping out of the National Library of Latvia

== In popular culture ==
In William Golding's novel, The Spire, set in the 14th century, dean Jocelin watches from the tower as the bishop's procession moves towards Salisbury Cathedral, with the ceremonial and practical aim of topping out. The bishop is bringing a decorative cross which will pin down the top of the spire, and complete the build.

== See also ==
- Barn raising
- Groundbreaking
- Opening ceremony
