= Crewdson =

Crewdson is a surname. Notable people with the name include:

- Bob Crewdson, English footballer
- Charles Crewdson, English engineer and company chairman, grandson of Eric
- Eric Crewdson (died 1967), English engineer, grandfather of Charles
- Geoff Crewdson (1938–2022), English rugby league player
- Gregory Crewdson (born 1962), American photographer
- Isaac Crewdson (1780–1844), minister, schismatic author
- Jane Crewdson (1808–1863), Cornish poet
- John M. Crewdson (born 1945), American reporter
