= The Scorpion God =

1971 collection of novellas by William Golding

- First edition cover
- Author: William Golding
- Language: English
- Publisher: Faber & Faber
- Publication date: 1971
- Publication place: United Kingdom
- Pages: 178
- ISBN: 978-0-571-09866-8 UK first edition hardcover

The Scorpion God is a collection of three novellas by William Golding published in 1971. They are all set in the distant past: "The Scorpion God" in ancient Egypt, "Clonk Clonk" in pre-historic Africa, and "Envoy Extraordinary" in ancient Rome. A draft of "The Scorpion God" had been written but abandoned in 1964, "Clonk Clonk" was newly written for the book, and "Envoy Extraordinary" had been published before, in 1956. "Envoy Extraordinary" became a play called The Brass Butterfly which was performed first in Oxford and later in London and New York.

This was Golding's first publication since The Pyramid in 1967 and his last until Darkness Visible in 1979, which he started to write in 1975 after a long period of "creative hibernation", the beginning of which is described in a journal he started at the time, under the heading 'History of a Crisis'.

== Themes ==
Critical opinion differs about whether the three novellas are bound by a common theme other than their setting in the deep past.

Leighton Hodson describes the first two as "taxing but contrasted works" characterised by "highly wrought spareness of expression" and the third as "lighter, though not included for entertainment purposes only." He says also that while the unity of theme between the three novellas is not straightforward, they can be thought of as "a sequence of meditations on human thinking", one about religion, one about man as a social animal, and one about "the potential dangers of the meddling intellect". Kevin McCarron sees the unifying theme as being instead to do with "the issue of progress": "The Scorpion God" concerns an outsider called the Liar challenging the established order of the kingdom he has entered; "Clonk Clonk", which is more optimistic about the potential value of innovation, considers an imagined prehistoric change in the relationship between men and women; and "Envoy Extraordinary" considers the perils of technological development. Don Crompton sees a connection between "The Scorpion God" and "Envoy Extraordinary" in their concern with the dangers of fixed world views but sees little other connection, saying "assiduous analysis can always be made to yield common ground between individual works, but these three stories are concerned with distinctive societies and draw independent lessons from them".

In an interview with James R. Baker in 1981, Golding himself said "if it has a unity it is one of the accidents of history" and that that wasn't something he set out to provide. He did also say in a letter to his editor that two other stories were too different from "The Scorpion God" and "Envoy Extraordinary" to include alongside them and instead wrote "Clonk Clonk" to complete the book.

== "The Scorpion God" ==
Golding wrote a first draft of the novella from which the collection takes its name in 1964, under the title "To Keep Now Still", but he was unhappy with how it came out and abandoned it until early 1969 when he rediscovered it and mentioned it to his editor, Charles Monteith at Faber & Faber, with the suggestion that it could be published together with "Envoy Extraordinary". He didn't send a copy until July 1970 after several re-drafts, at which point it had its final title.

The title relates to pharaohs from around 3200–3000 BC. The character "the Liar" is intended to be the pharaoh who unified Upper and Lower Egypt and established the First Dynasty. Golding knew there was debate about whether that pharaoh, Menes, was the same person as Narmer (whose name may mean "stinging") and about whether Narmer was the same person as King Scorpion. For the purposes of the story, they are one and the same, and the dying priest saying "he stings like a scorpion" is intended to reference this.

=== Plot ===
In fierce heat, a man called Great House (the literal meaning of Pharaoh), also known as the God, is performing a ritual run that takes place every seven years, from his palace, around a low building on a rocky outcrop and back, to ensure that the river will rise and allow the fields to be planted. He is accompanied by the Liar, an attendant of his. His eleven-year-old son, known only as the Prince, is supposed to be watching with an old blind man, but is ignoring it instead. The Prince doesn't want to have to become the God, which means marrying his sister, Pretty Flower, and taking on the burdens of holding up the sky and making the river rise. He is also going blind, a fact that panics the old man when he learns it, since it puts in jeopardy his ability to carry on the duties of the God, which he will be relied upon to perform. As Great House is almost finishing the run, delirious from exhaustion, he collides with the blind man's stick and collapses, as the blind man is trying to tell him of the Prince's condition. The Prince accuses him of lying and Pretty Flower has him sent away to "the pit". The failure of Great House to complete the run is a terrible omen. When the river last failed to rise high enough, the God of that time drank poison and his retinue were expected to follow him into the afterlife – the eternal Now – a prospect they accept happily but which terrifies the Liar.

Later, at a feast, Great House insists on hearing the Liar tell his "lies" about supposed places beyond the river, though he has heard them before. The Liar describes white men, the sea, ice, and snow, which Great House finds very amusing. Pretty Flower performs a ritual striptease dance, in which she is expected to seduce her father, who is more interested in drinking and playing a game of checkers with Head Man. The seduction is unsuccessful, which is a deep humiliation for Pretty Flower and a further failure on the part of Great House. As Head Man explains, this requires a "Beginning", which Great House is happy about. He drinks poison cheerfully, in certain knowledge of a pleasant and eternal Now, from where he will be able to ensure that the river rises after all. The river duly does rise and when it is at the appropriate height he is entombed in the central chamber of the low building. Others go into the other chambers to take poison and be ready to serve him in his Now. The Liar struggles against this, threatening not to tell his lies if made to take his own life. He is pronounced unclean by Head Man and sent to the pit to be 'cleaned'. The river keeps rising, threatening to cause devastating floods.

The Prince, who is being trained to succeed Great House, runs away and finds the pit, where the blind man is almost dead from dehydration. He talks to the Liar, asking him to take him to the cold place, and the Liar has him try to come back at night with his jewels and a rope.

Head Man is talking to Pretty Flower, and surmises that the river is still rising because Great House is angry, not because of Pretty Flower's failure to seduce him but because of Pretty Flower's attraction to the Liar, something against the laws of nature since all sex and marriage must be between blood relatives. Pretty Flower reveals that she had actually been having sex with the Liar, which Head Man did not know and which shakes him. The Prince arrives in search of rope for his escape plan, but Head Man understands what he is trying to achieve and has the Liar summoned, intending to persuade or force him to join Great House, so he can be appeased. The Liar tries to persuade Pretty Flower to take him as a husband instead, as all women would be permitted to him if he were Great House and their love would no longer be forbidden. He also claims to be able to make the river recede if given the chance. The Prince is delighted by the idea and Pretty Flower seems torn. Head Man orders two soldiers to kill him but the Liar is able to overpower them and escape across floodwaters, killing Head Man in the process. In his dying words, Head Man says that the Liar "stings like a scorpion" and has a "death wish". The last words of the story are Pretty Flower's: "All the same—we'd better go and talk to Him". The significance of the new capitalisation is left unstated.

== "Clonk Clonk" ==
"Clonk Clonk" was written specifically for The Scorpion God. At one point the plan had been for "The Scorpion God" and "Envoy Extraordinary" to be rounded out with two new short stories and later Monteith suggested using two much shorter stories of Golding's that had been previously published: "Miss Pulkinhorn" (Encounter, vol 15, August 1960, pp. 27–32) and "The Anglo Saxon" (Queen, 22 December 1959, pp. 12–14 and in the collection Winter's Tales 16, 1970, edited by Alan Duart Maclean). Golding felt that they were too different – "written with the right hand while SCORPION and ENVOY were written with the left, if you see what I mean" – and wrote "Clonk Clonk" instead.

Kevin McCarron describes "Clonk Clonk" as "a comic tale, and probably the most optimistic piece of fiction that Golding has ever published".

== "Envoy Extraordinary" ==
While "The Scorpion God" and "Clonk Clonk" were published for the first time in The Scorpion God, "Envoy Extraordinary" had appeared before in 1956 as one third of the collection Sometime, Never, published by Eyre & Spottiswoode, alongside "Consider Her Ways" by John Wyndham and "Boy in Darkness" by Mervyn Peake. The story concerns an inventor who anachronistically brings the steam engine to ancient Rome, along with three of the Four Great Inventions of China (gunpowder, the compass and the printing press).

Golding adapted "Envoy Extraordinary" into a radio play for the BBC and then into a play called The Brass Butterfly in 1957. The play was first performed in 1958 in Oxford, in a production starring Alistair Sim and George Cole

Leighton Hodson compares the novella to "The Rewards of Industry" from Richard Garnett's 1888 collection The Twilight of the Gods and Other Tales, in which three Chinese brothers bring printing, gunpowder and chess to the West, but only chess is accepted. Walter Sullivan writing for The Sewanee Review in 1963, described The Brass Butterfly as "witty but by no means profound" and "Envoy Extraordinary" as "a not very successful novella about ancient Rome". In his book about Golding, Kevin McCarron says that The Brass Butterfly is "too often dismissed as lightweight" and that it has more to say about "the terrible cost of progress" than it is given credit for.

== Publication ==
The first hardcover edition of The Scorpion God (ISBN 978-0-571-09866-8) was published in the UK by Faber & Faber on 25 October 1971 in an edition of 12,000. The US first edition (ISBN 978-0-151-36410-7) was published by Harcourt Brace Jovanovich on 26 January 1972 in an edition of 7,486.

There was some disagreement about the appropriate advance. Golding had received $10,000 from Harcourt for his previous novel, The Pyramid, but was offered $3,500 for The Scorpion God. At Golding's insistence this was raised to $5,000. In the UK with Faber & Faber he received the same as he had done for The Pyramid: £500.
