= William Jory Henwood =

British geologist (1805–1875)

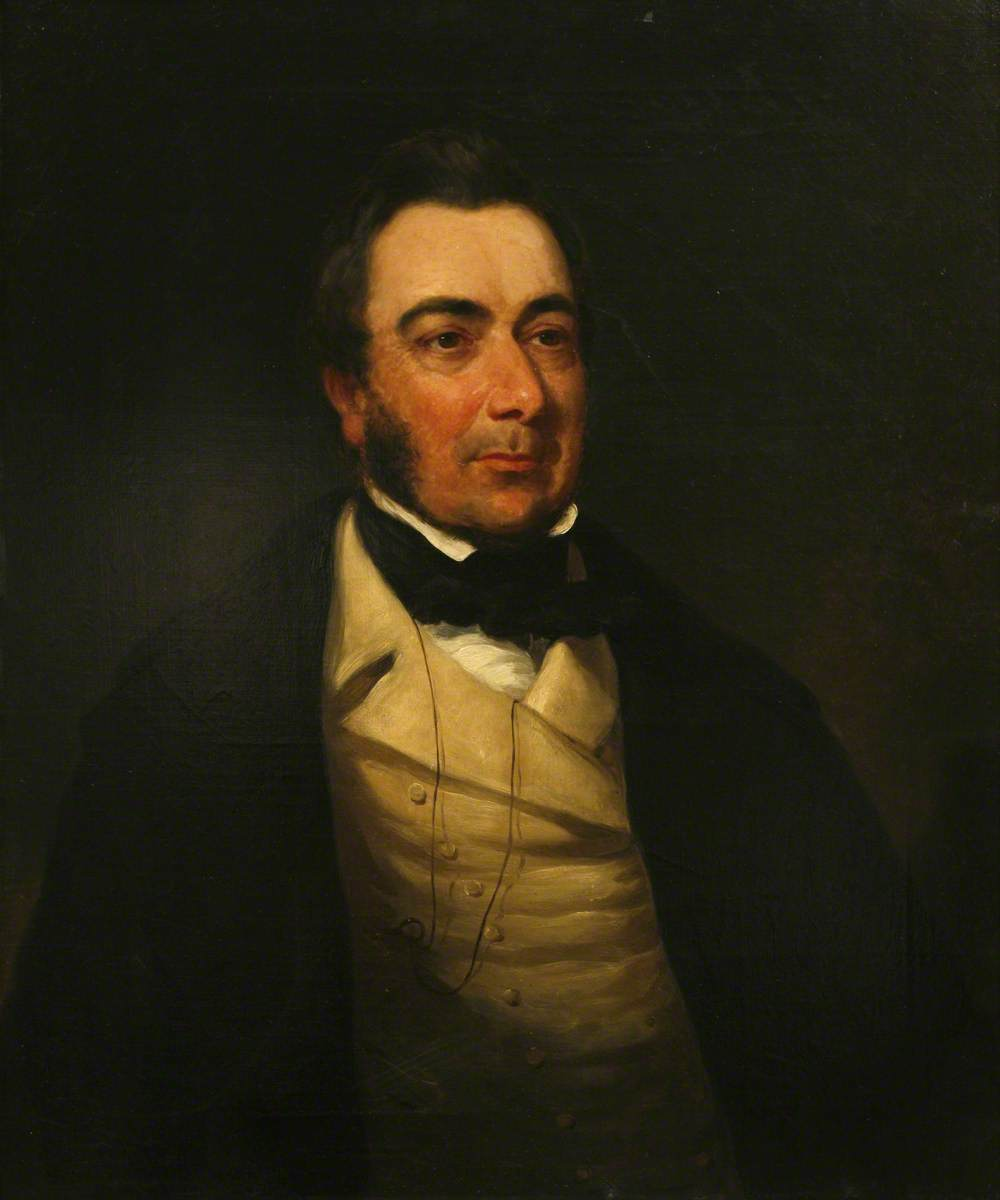
- Portrait by Richard Thomas Pentreath (1806–1869).
- Known for: Prolific writer on geological and mining topics in Cornwall.
- Scientific career
- Fields: Geology, Mining

William Jory Henwood FRS (16 January 1805 – 5 August 1875), was a Cornish mining geologist. He was a prolific writer on geological topics, for which he was awarded the Murchison Medal of the Geological Society of London.

== Life and career ==
Henwood was born at Perran Wharf, Cornwall in 1805. In 1822 he commenced work as a clerk in an office of the Perran Foundry, owned by the Fox family of Falmouth, a post previously held by his father, John Henwood. He received some tuition in science at the home of Charles Fox.

Henwood soon took an active interest in the working of mines and in the metalliferous deposits. He was funded by the Fox family and local gentry to survey Cornish mines. He developed a theory on how metal lodes had been formed. Unfortunately, he saw Robert Were Fox, who was researching in the same field, as a plagiarist.

In 1832 Henwood was appointed to the office of assay-master and supervisor of tin in the duchy of Cornwall, a post from which he retired in 1838. Meanwhile, he had commenced in 1826 to communicate papers on mining subjects to the Royal Geological Society of Cornwall, and the Geological Society of London, and in 1840 he was elected Fellow of the Royal Society.

In 1843 he went to take charge of the Gongo Soco mines in Brazil; afterwards he proceeded to India to report on certain metalliferous deposits for the Indian government; and in 1858, impaired in health, he retired and settled at Penzance.

== Publications ==
In 1839 a paper entitled "On the Expansive Action of Steam in some of the Pumping Engines on the Cornish Mines", published in the Philosophical Magazine, won him the Telford Medal in silver.

His most important memoirs on the metalliferous deposits of Cornwall and Devon were published in 1843 by the Royal Geological Society of Cornwall. At a much later date he communicated with enlarged experience a second series of Observations on Metalliferous Deposits, and on Subterranean Temperature (reprinted from Trans. R. Geol. Soc. Cornwall, 2 vols, 1871).

In 1874 he contributed a paper on the Detrital Tin-ore of Cornwall (Journal of the Royal Institution of Cornwall). The Murchison Medal of the Geological Society of London was awarded to him in 1875, and the mineral Henwoodite was named after him.

He was concerned about the conditions of slaves, working in mines, and he published a pamphlet on the subject in 1864, reprinted in volume eight (1871) of the Transactions of the Royal Geological Society of Cornwall.
