= Hot Gates =

Hot Gates or Hot Gate may refer to:

- Thermopylae, a location in Greece famous for the Battle of Thermopylae
- The Hot Gates, a collection of writing by William Golding
- The Hot Gate, third book in the Troy Rising series by John Ringo
- Hot Gates, a song written by Christopher Torr, and sung by Laurika Rauch
