= Newman Watts =

British author

Newman Watts ( 25 September 1895 - 19 January 1949) was a British author known for his novel The Man Who Could Not Sin, about the second coming of Christ. An excerpt from the novel was included in John Carey's Faber Book of Utopias.

Born 25 September 1895, Watts was part of a Protestant family . He married Esther Chapman in 1918, and the couple had two children.

Watts was also known as 'A London Journalist' and wrote a regular column in the Christian Herald.He wrote over 40 Christian books, publications and tracts.

Watts died on 19 January 1949 of tuberculosis.
