= Moving Target =

Moving Target may refer to:

== Music ==
- Moving Target (Gil Scott-Heron album), 1982
- Moving Target (Royal Hunt album), 1995
- Moving Target (Simon Townshend album), 1985, or the title track

== Films ==
- Moving Target (1988 American film), a made-for-TV film starring Jason Bateman
- Moving Target (1988 Italian film), an Italian thriller film starring Ernest Borgnine
- Moving Target (1997 film), an American film starring Michael Dudikoff and Billy Dee Williams
- Moving Target (2000 film), an American-Irish action film
- Moving Target (2011 film), a British thriller
- The Moving Target (film), the UK title for the 1966 American film Harper
- Bersaglio mobile, a 1967 Italian spy film released internationally as Death on the Run and Moving Target
- The Marine 4: Moving Target, a 2015 American film

== Writings ==
- A Moving Target, a 1982 collection of essays and lectures by William Golding
- The Moving Target, a 1949 mystery novel by Ross Macdonald, the first in a series about private investigator Lew Archer
- Moving Target, a 2001 novel by Ann Maxwell under the pen name Elizabeth Lowell
- Moving Target, UK and Australia title of the 2004 Vatta's War novel Marque and Reprisal by Elizabeth Moon
- Moving Target: A Princess Leia Adventure, a 2015 novel - see Journey to Star Wars

== Other uses ==
- "Moving Target" (New Tricks), a 2011 television episode
- Moving Target, a video game by Players Premier Software

== See also ==
- Moving Targets (disambiguation)
- Running target shooting
