= Envoy Extraordinary =

Envoy Extraordinary may refer to:

- Envoy (title), a diplomatic rank
- "Envoy Extraordinary" (novella), a 1956 novella by William Golding
