= Jane Crewdson =

British poet (1808–1863)

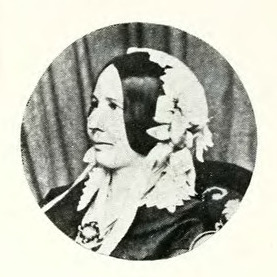
- Born: 22 October 1808; Perranarworthal
- Died: 15 September 1863 (aged 54); Manchester
- Occupation: Poet, hymnwriter

Jane Crewdson (1808–1863) was a Cornish poet, best known for her collections of poems. Born in Cornwall, part of the Fox family of Falmouth, Crewdson married a Manchester cotton manufacturer.

== Life ==
Jane Fox was born at Perran-arworthal, Cornwall, on 22 October 1808. She was the second daughter of George Fox, part of the Fox family of Falmouth, who was manager of the local iron foundry. She was also related to Charles Fox, the scientific writer. The family moved to Exeter in 1825 and on 12 October 1836 Fox married Thomas Dillworth Crewdson, who was a cotton manufacturer from Manchester. Her religion is unclear, as one source identifies her as Church of England, while her marriage register was marked under the Quaker's Society of Friends.

== Works ==
Crewdson's best known work is her hymns. She contributed several to Lovell Squire's Selection of Scriptural Poetry, 1848, and others to Nicholas Smith's Songs from the Hearts of Women: One Hundred Famous Hymns and Their Writers, 1903.

She also worked on poetry, and in 1851, published a small volume of poems, entitled Aunt Jane's Verses for Children, which was reprinted in 1855 and 1871. The book was primarily about heroes found in the Bible as well as some more secular pieces. Her second work was published in 1860 and was entitled Lays of the Reformation, and other Lyrics, scriptural and Miscellaneous.

Crewdson died on 15 September 1863 after a period of illness at her home in Whalley Range, Manchester. A further selection of her poetry pieces were collected and published under the title of A Little While and other Poems (Manchester, 1864, 12mo).
