= Poems (Golding collection) =

First edition

Poems was the first work by British novelist William Golding (better known for Lord of the Flies, among other novels), released in 1934, 20 years before Lord of the Flies (his second major work and first novel).
