= The Double Tongue =

1995 novel by William Golding

- First edition (UK)
- Author: William Golding
- Language: English
- Genre: Psychological/Historical novel
- Publisher: Faber & Faber (UK); Farrar Straus & Giroux (US)
- Publication date: 1995
- Publication place: United Kingdom
- Media type: Print (Hardback & Paperback)
- Pages: 160
- ISBN: 0-571-17526-0
- OCLC: 60281814

The Double Tongue is a novel by William Golding. It was found in draft form after his death and published posthumously.

Golding's final novel tells the story of the Pythia, the priestess of Apollo at Delphi. Arieka prophesies in the shadowy years of the 1st century BC when the Romans were securing their grip on the tribes and cities of Greece. The plain, unloved daughter of a local grandee, she is rescued from the contempt and neglect of her family by her Delphic role.

== Reception ==
Kirkus Reviews called it "intriguing, but unfinished", and emphasized that although it is "more than a mere footnote" to Golding's career, it is also "far less than a full-bodied tale worthy of being judged on its own merits.

Frank Kermode, writing in the London Review of Books, noted that the title alludes to "the forked tongue of the Python which Apollo inherited when he killed the beast, and so to the phenomenon of oracular ambiguity."
