= Pincher Martin =

1956 novel by William Golding

- First edition
- Author: William Golding
- Cover artist: Anthony Gross
- Language: English
- Genre: Allegorical
- Publisher: Faber and Faber
- Publication date: 1956
- Publication place: United Kingdom
- Media type: Print (Paperback & Hardback)
- Pages: 208

Pincher Martin (published in America as Pincher Martin: The Two Deaths of Christopher Martin) is a novel by British writer William Golding, first published in 1956. It is Golding's third novel, following The Inheritors and his debut Lord of the Flies. It is one of Golding's best-known novels, noted for being existential and minimalistic in setting.

== Plot ==
The plot of Pincher Martin surrounds the survival and psychophysical, spiritual, and existential plight of one Christopher Hadley "Pincher" Martin, a temporary naval lieutenant who believes himself to be the sole survivor of a military torpedo destroyer that sinks in the North Atlantic Ocean. At the start of the novel, Martin is in the water and desperately fighting for his life. He is saved after being providentially washed ashore on a rocky mid-Atlantic islet. He deduces that his naval crew is dead and begins his grim struggle for survival but, as time goes by, a series of strange and increasingly terrifying events, which he at first dismisses as hallucinations, slowly provokes in him an existential crisis.

Throughout the novel Golding juxtaposes themes of sanity and insanity, and reality and unreality. At first Martin is portrayed as a thinking individual, who uses his intelligence, education and training to source food, collect fresh water and alert any potential rescuers. It is in fact during this rational phase that Martin is at his most delusional. It is only when insanity takes hold that he begins to comprehend the reality of his predicament: "There is a pattern emerging. I do not know what the pattern is but even my dim guess at it makes my reason falter".

The novel's twist ending reveals that Martin actually drowned shortly after his ship was sunk. When his body is found it is noted that "he didn't even have time to kick off his seaboots". This means that his struggle for survival on the island never actually happened, which changes the work into an allegory of purgatory and damnation. In the Radio Times of 21 March 1958, Golding explains that Martin, driven by a selfish greed for life, has continued to exist in another dimension: "His drowned body lies rolling in the Atlantic but the ravenous ego invents a rock for him to endure on".

== Setting ==
The North Atlantic islet in question is described in the novel as very small, rocky, barren and remote, "only appearing on weather charts". ("A single point of rock, peak of a mountain range, one tooth set in the ancient jaw of a sunken world, projecting through the inconceivable vastness of the whole ocean.") A captain is quoted as saying "I call that name a near miss."

== Critical Connections ==
Terry Eagleton discusses the novel at length in chapter one of his book On Evil.

== See also ==
- H. Taprell Dorling – British sailor and writer who wrote Pincher Martin, O.D.: a story of the inner life of the Royal Navy in 1916
- Rockall – Uninhabited islet in the North Atlantic, proposed as the setting of Pincher Martin
