= Mineralization (geology) =

In geology, deposition of economically important metals

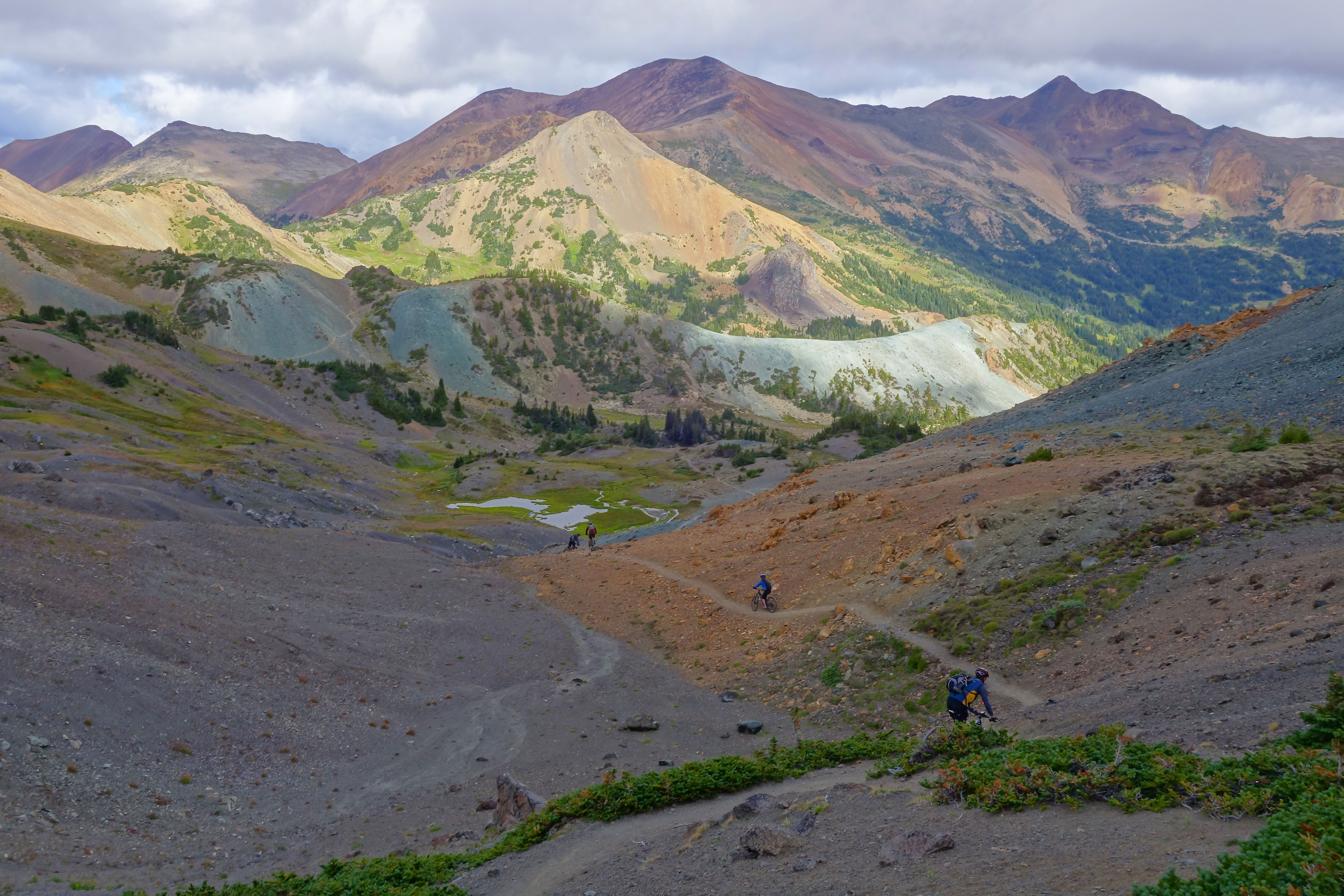
The Chilcotin Ranges of British Columbia exhibit vibrant colours from heavy mineralization.

In geology, mineralization is the deposition of economically important metals in the formation of ore bodies or "lodes" by various process.

The first scientific studies of this process took place in Cornwall by W.J.Henwood FRS and later by R.W. Fox, FRS.

The term can also refer to the process by which waterborne minerals, such as calcium carbonate (calcite), iron oxide (hematite or limonite) or silica (quartz), replace organic material within the body of an organism that has died and was buried by sediments.

Mineralization may also refer to the product resulting from the process of mineralization. For example, mineralization (the process) may introduce metals (such as iron) into a rock. That rock may then be referred to as possessing iron mineralization.

== See also ==
- Ore genesis
