= Tullimaar House =

Country house in Perranarworthal, Cornwall, England

- Location within Cornwall
- 50.2082°N 5.1096°W
- Location: Perranarworthal, Cornwall, England

Listed Building – Grade II*
- Official name: Tullimaar
- Designated: 30 May 1967
- Reference no.: 1161008

Tullimaar House is a mansion just east of Perranarworthal in west Cornwall, England, United Kingdom; it is not visible from the main A39 Falmouth to Truro road, and stands in private grounds. However, the white gate forming the entrance to the property can be seen from the road.

== History ==
=== 19th century ===
It was built in 1828 for Benjamin Sampson, born in 1770, who was originally a "bal carpenter" (i.e., carpenter at a mine) and founded the gunpowder works at Kennall Vale. He also held the post of Manager and shareholder in the Perran Foundry, and was an adventurer in Tresavean Mine near Lanner, Cornwall, from which he derived a large fortune. He had Tullimaar built and resided there until his death 12 years later in 1840. He was buried at Gwennap.

The house has been home to many distinguished residents or guests including Sarah Parkin widow of Dr Henry Parkin, RN, Inspector-General of Hospitals and Fleets, and illegitimate child of one of the daughters of George III, who spent her last years there. She was the mother of Caroline, later Mrs F. Hearle-Cock.

The 1861 census shows that the house was occupied by William Henry Lanyon, manager of Kennall Vale.

In 1870 the Rev. Francis Kilvert spent nearly 3 weeks on holiday at Tullimaar with his friends Mr and Mrs William Hockin.

In the 1891 census, it was occupied by Francis Hearle Cock, solicitor, and his family. His two nieces, Mabile Mary Arundell and Katherine Mary Arundell, the granddaughters of Baron Arundell of Wardour, also lived there.

=== 20th century ===
Tullimaar was inhabited until at least 1918 by the Hearle-Cocks, when Francis Hearle-Cock's widow, Caroline, died. It was, presumably, inherited by her only child and heir, Catherine Paull. Tullimaar was later occupied by American troops during the latter part of World War II and U.S. General Dwight D. Eisenhower stayed at the house for two weeks in the run-up to D-Day in 1944. These troops brought all their stores with them and when they eventually left on D-Day, all the packing cases, some of which were not even opened, were dumped in Rosemanowes Quarry. In the central east room of the house there is a commemorative brass plaque with the wording 'A shot was fired through this window by a sentry Running Amok 1944'. It is reported that the incident occurred whilst Eisenhower was using the house as his personal headquarters.

Marthe Bibesco, the Franco-Romanian writer, lived here, after purchasing Tullimaar in 1957 until 1973. She had a plaque placed in the hall stating that the Normandy landings had been planned by General Eisenhower while staying in the house during 1944. Doubt was cast on this by local historians and later owners covered the plaque (which still exists) with a wall hanging. However it was subsequently confirmed that Eisenhower and Winston Churchill had met at Tullimaar for discussions prior to D-Day.

In recent years the house was home to Nobel Prize-winning novelist Sir William Golding who lived at Tullimaar with his wife Ann Brookfield from 1985 until his death there in June 1993. He described it as "a devastatingly beautiful house in the middle of a flowering wilderness" and drafted several of his novels while living there. Golding and his wife Ann selected Tullimaar because of the privacy from unwelcome fan attention provided by its relatively remote location and the surrounding woodlands. The house was later occupied by David Golding, William's son (1940-2022).

=== Description ===
Tullimaar ("House on the Hill") is set in a parkland of five acres of woods and gardens. It includes a gardener's lodge and a separate cottage. William Golding devoted much of his final years to clearing a large walled garden located to the south of the house from overgrowth, substituting rows of apple trees. The mansion itself features a succession of tall windows on both floors, reaching almost to each floor.
