= Moving Targets =

Moving Targets may refer to:

- Moving Targets (Flo & Eddie album), 1976
- Moving Targets (Penetration album), 1978
- Moving Targets (film), 2004 Hong Kong action film
- Moving Targets (band), American alternative rock band

== See also ==
- Moving Target (disambiguation)
