= The Spire =

1964 novel by William Golding

- First edition cover
- Author: William Golding
- Cover artist: John Piper
- Language: English
- Publisher: Faber and Faber
- Publication date: December 1964
- Publication place: United Kingdom
- Media type: Print (hardback & paperback)
- Pages: 223 (hardback edition)
- OCLC: 67489424

The Spire is a 1964 novel by English author William Golding. "A dark and powerful portrait of one man's will", it deals with the construction of a 404-foot-high spire loosely based on Salisbury Cathedral, the vision of the fictional Dean Jocelin. In the novel, Golding utilises stream-of-consciousness writing with an omniscient but increasingly fallible narrator to show Jocelin's demise as he chooses to follow his own will as opposed to the will of God.

== Background ==
The Spire was envisioned by Golding as a historical novel with a moral struggle at its core, which was originally intended to have two settings: both the Middle Ages and modern day. Whilst teaching at Bishop Wordsworth's School, Golding regularly looked out of his classroom window at Salisbury Cathedral and wondered how he would possibly construct its spire But the book's composition and eventual realisation of The Spire was not an easy process for Golding. According to his daughter, Judy Carver, Golding 'struggled like anything to write The Spire' and said that the novel 'went through many drafts'; this was perhaps because he had stopped teaching which, in turn, gave him more time to write.

Golding first wrote fifty to sixty thousand words of a draft in February 1962 over just fourteen days and decided to take a grace period in order to finish the novel for English and American publication by December of the same year. However, by November he 'confessed that he was in "a state of misery" over the novel'. One reason for his discontent may have been Golding's longstanding 'terror of adverse criticism' as well as his editor, Charles Monteith, repeatedly asking him to co-edit an anthology of modern poetry with W. H. Auden and discouraging him from writing his own poetry collection. After a lecturing trip to America in February and March 1963, Golding found that he was still struggling to write when he returned, and worried greatly about both the novel's narrative and its relevance to a contemporary audience.

As tended to be the case, Golding's fears were ultimately unnecessary; Monteith and Peter du Sautoy liked the typescript but agreed that it required editing. Golding was pleased at the news, and Monteith sent back edits which suggested splitting the novel into chapters; by 17 July 1963, Golding reported that he had reworked the first three chapters and was confident he would finish the book over the next fortnight. However, Golding first had to attend a conference by 'COMES, the European community of writers' and, despite telling Monteith on 27 August that his revisions would be complete in the next ten days, William and Ann Golding went to Greece to meet Peter Green: an ex-journalist who had expatriated to Molyvos.

After working on the novel in Greece, a frustrated Golding sent his next draft of The Spire to Monteith in October and was unsatisfied with his writing owing to an 'inner dispute between religion and reason'. This internal conflict occurred as Golding continued to return corrected typescripts and proofs but, though Golding had been feeling nervous since January, the novel was published on 10 April 1964. The typescripts for The Spire, along with a page of handwritten manuscript notes, can now be found in the University of Exeter's Special Collections archive.

== Plot ==
Jocelin, the Dean of the cathedral, directs the construction of a towering spire funded by his aunt, Lady Alison, a mistress of the former King. The project is carried on against the advice of many, and in particular the warnings of the master builder, Roger Mason. The cathedral has insufficient foundations to support a spire of the magnificence demanded by Jocelin, but he believes he has been chosen by God and given a vision to erect a great spire to exalt the town and to bring its people closer to God. As the novel progresses, Golding explores Jocelin's growing obsession with the completion of the spire, during which he is increasingly afflicted by pain in his spine (which the reader gradually comes to realise is the result of tuberculosis). Jocelin interprets the burning heat in his back as an angel, alternately comforting or punishing him depending on the warmth or pain he feels. Jocelin's obsession blinds him to reality as he neglects his duties as Dean, fails to pray and ignores the people who need him the most. The pit dug to explore the foundations at the Cathedral crossing becomes a place where chthonic forces surge, as the four tower pillars begin to 'sing'.

Jocelin also struggles with his unacknowledged lust for Goody Pangall, the wife of the crippled and impotent cathedral servant, Pangall. Jocelin seems at first to see Goody as his daughter in God. However, as the novel progresses, and Goody's husband is tormented and ridiculed as their 'fool' by the bullying workmen, Jocelin becomes tormented by sexual desire, usually triggered by the sight of Goody's red hair.

Comparisons between Goody and Rachel, Roger Mason's wife, are made throughout the novel. Jocelin believes Goody sets an example to Rachel, whom he dislikes for her garrulousness and for revealing that her marriage to Roger remains unconsummated. However, Jocelin overestimates Goody's purity, and is horrified when he discovers Goody is embarking upon an affair with Roger Mason. Tortured by envy and guilt, Jocelin finds himself unable to pray. He is repulsed by his sexual thoughts, referred to as "the devil" during his dreams.

The Cathedral building, its ordered life, and the lives of the people around Jocelin are disrupted because of the intractable problems arising from the construction of the spire, but Jocelin continues to drive his dream to its conclusion. His visions and hallucinations, hence his denial of the reality of the situation, mark his descent into irrationality. As the true costs, financial and spiritual, of the endeavour become apparent, the story moves to its tragic conclusion.

Pangall disappears; although his fate is never made explicit, it is clear from the clue of the mistletoe that he was a pagan sacrifice buried at the Crossing by the builders to secure their luck against the stupidity of continuing the work. Goody Pangall dies in childbirth, bearing Roger Mason's child. Roger becomes a drunkard and at the end Jocelin dies of his illness, though only after first hearing from his aunt that his appointment was due only to her sexual influence, not to his merits. Before he dies, the phallic imagery of the Spire is displaced by the mysterious symbol of the tree. The spire is incomplete at the end of the story, and there is a growing sense of impending disaster due to the instability of the over-ambitious structure.

== Characters ==
=== Jocelin ===
Dean Jocelin is the character through whom the novel is presented. Golding uses the stream of consciousness technique to show his Lear-like descent into madness. The novel charts the destruction of his self-confidence and ambition. As the construction of the spire draws to an end, Jocelin is removed from his position as Dean and his abandonment of his religious duties is denounced by the church Council. Ultimately, he succumbs to his illness which he had personified as his guardian angel.

Jocelin may have been named after Josceline de Bohon, Bishop of Salisbury from 1142 to 1184, who is buried in Salisbury Cathedral.

=== Roger Mason ===
Roger Mason, a medieval Master Mason, is, in direct contrast to Jocelin, physically powerful and a rationalist. He is associated with the imagery of a bull and a stallion. Roger contends with Jocelin, arguing that the cathedral foundations are insufficient to support the spire. He is forced to continue with the project because Jocelin makes it impossible for him to work elsewhere. After the death of Goody, Roger becomes an alcoholic. In a moment of clarity, Jocelin visits Roger and we eventually learn of his suicide attempt.

=== Rachel ===
Rachel Mason is Roger's wife. She reveals to Jocelin the reason why they cannot have children as attempts at sex result in fits of giggles.

=== Pangall ===
Pangall is the crippled and impotent cathedral servant. He is mocked because of his impotency by the workmen.

=== Goody ===
Goody, who acts as an important object of love and lust, ultimately dies while giving birth. Jocelin initially sees her as the perfect woman.

=== Father Anselm ===
Anselm is largely critical of the developments concerning the spire, arguing that it is destruction of the church. Jocelin had been prepared to lose his friendship with Anselm as part of the cost of the spire, but we learn by the end of the novel that they appeared not to have had a friendship in the first place.

=== Father Adam ===
Father Adam is dubbed by Jocelin as "Father Anonymous", indicating Jocelin's feelings of superiority. Until the end of the novel, when Father Adam becomes Jocelin's caretaker, he is largely a minor character who is surprised by how Jocelin was never taught to pray, doing his best to help him to heaven.

=== Lady Alison ===
A wealthy mistress of the late King, we learn how the money funding the spire was a result of this affair. With the appearance of a "tiny woman – not much larger than a child", she is plump and pale, wearing a black dress, black hair, eyes and make-up, with mainly small features. Her wealth and sexuality is presented through her pearls and perfume and she takes care of her appearance, having smooth skin with fine lines, despite her age.

== Reception ==
"A most remarkable book, as unforeseeable as one foresaw, an entire original ... remote from the mainstream, potent, severe, even forbidding." – Frank Kermode, New York Review of Books, 30 April 1964.

== Adaptations ==
Canadian-British director Roger Spottiswoode optioned The Spire in the mid-1990s, originally intending to adapt it for screen and cited as a project in development. In November 2012, a play adaptation by Spottiswoode was premiered at the Salisbury Playhouse, directed by Gareth Minchin.

An audiobook version, voiced by Benedict Cumberbatch, was released by Faber & Faber Audio in 2014. Excerpts from Cumberbatch's reading are included in an introductory film on the novel produced by William Golding Limited.

== Sources ==
- Carey, Professor John (2009). William Golding: The Man Who Wrote Lord of the Flies. London: Faber and Faber Limited. ISBN 978-0-571-23163-8.
