= The Paper Men =

1984 novel by William Golding

- Author: William Golding
- Language: English
- Publisher: Faber and Faber
- Publication date: Feb 1984
- Publication place: United Kingdom
- Media type: Print
- Pages: 191
- ISBN: 0-571-13206-5

The Paper Men is a 1984 novel by British writer William Golding.

== Plot summary ==
The novel follows Wilfred Barclay, an alcoholic and middle-aged writer trapped in an unhappy marriage, and his conflict with Rick Tucker, a young professor determined to write Barclay's biography. Barclay tries to escape Tucker's attention by fleeing to Europe. Tucker is desperate to gain control over the writer's personal papers as he pursues Barclay across Europe.

== Origins ==
Golding was inspired to write the novel when reading Carlos Baker's biography of Ernest Hemingway. Wilfred Barclay is to some extent a self-portrait by Golding, who was not patient with his critics.
