= Rashleighite =

Rare Mineral

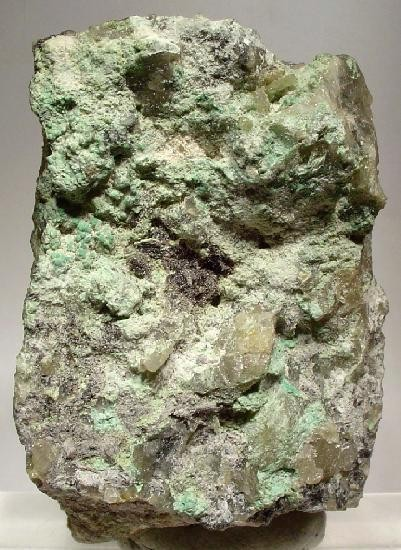

General
- Category: Minerals

Rashleighite, also called henwoodite, is a ferrian variety of turquoise. The names are in honour of the Cornish geologists Philip Rashleigh and William Jory Henwood.
