= The Inheritors (Golding novel) =

1955 novel by William Golding

- First edition cover depicting The Sorcerer
- Author: William Golding
- Cover artist: Anthony Gross
- Language: English
- Genre: Novel prehistoric fiction
- Publisher: Faber and Faber
- Publication date: 1955
- Publication place: United Kingdom
- Media type: Print (hardback and paperback)
- Pages: 233 pp

The Inheritors is a work of prehistoric fiction and the second novel by the British author William Golding, best known for his first novel, Lord of the Flies (1954). It concerns the extinction of one of the last remaining tribes of Neanderthals at the hands of the more sophisticated Homo sapiens. It was published by Faber and Faber in 1955.

== Background ==
Like Lord of the Flies, The Inheritors began life in a Bishop Wordsworth's School notebook. This handwritten manuscript and the typescript that ensued are now held in the University of Exeter's Special Collections Archives, where they can be used for further research and study.

Golding began work on The Inheritors in the autumn of 1954, mere weeks after the publication of Lord of the Flies; Golding was concerned that he would be unable to write another novel and had sent a 'long, anxious letter in return' to his editor Charles Monteith when asked what his next publication would be. He had started writing a novel exploring the father-son relationship through the mythical character of Telegonus (son of Odysseus), titled In Search of My Father, a year prior; Monteith requested a chapter, the typescript for which demonstrates 'some of Golding's most spectacular prose'. Monteith was 'enormously interested', but after favourable reviews of Lord of the Flies, it was left unfinished owing to Golding's belief that it would come off as a cheap imitation of other historical epics.

Golding finished his first draft of The Inheritors on 11 November 1954, though he deemed his own handwriting illegible and worked on the novel significantly over Christmas, redrafting, reworking, and typing the manuscript to submit to Monteith. The following February, Monteith received the revised typescript along with a letter from Golding featuring a host of disclaimers that betrayed his nervousness surrounding the novel that would follow up Lord of the Flies. Golding had also wanted to finish the book sooner; after moving house to the Victorian vicarage across the road, his increased rent had made him 'consequently hard up'. But Golding had no reason to worry and, in fact, soon found that the book would be completed more quickly than he had previously anticipated; after a few proof readings, Monteith saw that the book was fit to publish. There was little editing required and, although he was initially unsure about having cavemen as the subject of a novel, Monteith knew that the book was a masterpiece that was 'perfect as it stood'.

== Plot ==
This novel is an imaginative reconstruction of the life of a band of Neanderthals, consisting of an old man (Mal), an unnamed old woman, four adults (Ha, Nil, Lok and Fa), a little girl (Liku) and a baby, simply referred to as "the new one". It is written in such a way that the reader might assume the group to be modern Homo sapiens as they gesture and speak simply among themselves, and bury their dead with heartfelt, solemn rituals. They also have powerful sense impressions and feelings, and appear sometimes to share thoughts in a near-telepathic way. As the novel progresses it becomes more and more apparent that they live very simply, using their considerable mental abilities to connect to one another without extensive vocabulary or the kinds of memories that create culture. They have wide knowledge of food sources, mostly roots and vegetables. They chase hyenas from a larger beast's kill and eat meat, but they don't kill mammals themselves. They have a spiritual system centering on a female principle of bringing forth, but their lives are lived so much in the present that the reader realizes they are very different from us, living in something like an eternal present, or at most a present broken and shaped by seasons.

One of the band, Lok, is a point of view character. He is the one we follow as one by one the adults of the band die or are killed, then the young are stolen by the "new people", a group of early modern humans. Lok and Fa, the remaining adults, are fascinated and repelled by the new people. They observe their actions and rituals with amazement, only slowly understanding that harm is meant by the sticks of the new people.

The humans are portrayed as strange, godlike beings as the Neanderthals witness their mastery of fire, Upper Palaeolithic weaponry and sailing.

All save the last chapters of the novel are written from the Neanderthals' stark, simple stylistic perspective. Their observations of early human behaviour serve as a filter for Golding's exercise in paleoanthropology, in which modern readers will recognize precursors of later human societal constructs, e.g., religion, culture, sacrifice and war.

The penultimate chapter employs an omniscient viewpoint, observing Lok. For the first time, the novel describes the people the reader has been inhabiting through the first-person perspective. Lok, totally alone, gives up in despair.

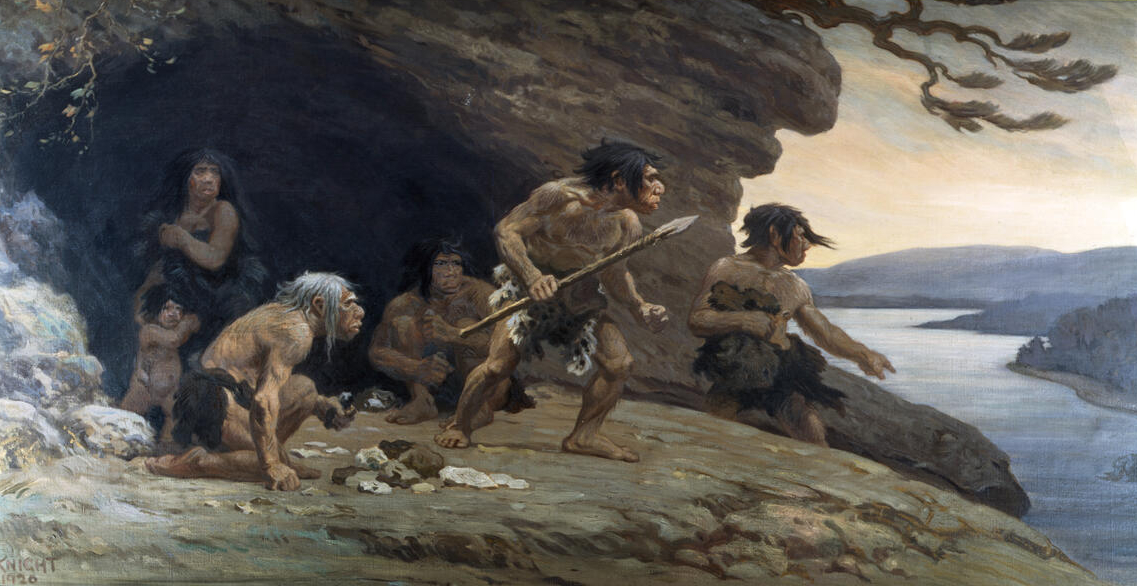
Restoration of Le Moustier Neanderthals (Charles R. Knight, 1920)

In the final chapter, we move to the point of view of the new race, more or less modern humans fleeing in their boats, revealing that they are terribly afraid of the Neanderthals (whom they believe to be devils of the forest) and of pretty much everything around. This last chapter, the only one written from the humans' point of view, reinforces the inheritance of the world by the new species.

The fleeing humans carry with them an infant Neanderthal, of whom they are simultaneously afraid and enamoured, hinting at the later hypothesis of inter-breeding between Neanderthals and modern humans.

== Reception ==
The Inheritors was published on 16 September 1955, when Golding's literary reputation was still in its nascent stages. However, though few in number to begin with, reviews of the book were largely positive: two separate critics—Philip Day from The Sunday Times and Peter Green (who was later a friend of Golding's) from The Daily Telegraph—described the novel as a tour de force, whilst Isabel Quigly called it "a many-dimensional and astonishing book" in The Spectator two weeks after its initial publication, along with similarly positive reviews from myriad newspapers and literary journals. These sat amongst two more negative reviews: one from a leading member of the Communist Party of Great Britain, Margot Heinemann, who found the book hard to understand and disapproved of its allegedly negative portrayal of man's ascension; and one from The Times, that would have preferred it if Neanderthals were the subjects of history books and not fiction.

The novel sold 1,800 copies by 3 October and 3,000 by 28 October. Sales figures of Golding's previous book in America affected American publishers' opinions on the novel, who worried that a novel like The Inheritors would only receive 'ivory-tower appreciation' and consequently chose not to publish it at the time.

In a 2021 review, Ben Okri in the Irish Times admires its invention of the language it uses:

One of the great achievements of the novel is the language in which it is rendered. There is a special quality to the writing. Golding not only invents a world but invests it with a high degree of linguistic intensity. The language owes something to the liberating achievement of James Joyce, Virginia Woolf and stream-of-consciousness. But its achievement is wholly Golding's own.

The book, particularly the last chapter, was the inspiration for the 1976 song "A Trick of the Tail" by British rock band Genesis.

== See also ==
- Neanderthal interaction with Cro-Magnons
- Neanderthal extinction hypotheses
- The Clan of the Cave Bear, a novel about a Cro-Magnon girl raised by Neanderthals, by Jean M. Auel
- Dance of the Tiger, a novel depicting Neanderthal and Cro-Magnon interaction, by paleontologist Björn Kurtén
- The Neanderthal Parallax, a trilogy of novels written by Robert J. Sawyer depicting the effects of the opening of a connection between two versions of Earth in different parallel universes: the world familiar to the reader, and another where Neanderthals became the dominant intelligent hominid.

== General sources ==
- Carey, John (2009). William Golding: The Man Who Wrote Lord of the Flies. London: Faber and Faber. ISBN 978-0-571-23163-8.
