= Free Fall (Golding novel) =

1959 novel by William Golding

- First edition cover
- Author: William Golding
- Cover artist: Anthony Gross
- Language: English
- Publisher: Faber & Faber
- Publication date: 1959
- Publication place: United Kingdom
- Media type: Print (hardback & paperback)

Free Fall is the fourth novel of English novelist William Golding, first published in 1959. Written in the first person, it is a self-examination by an English painter, Samuel Mountjoy, held in a German POW camp during World War II.

== Plot ==
Samuel ('Sammy') Mountjoy, a talented painter but a directionless and unhappy man, is a prisoner of war in Germany during World War II. Recently some inmates escaped from his camp. A Gestapo officer, Dr. Halde, interviews Sammy in an attempt to find out about the escape organisation; when Sammy denies knowing anything, Halde has him locked in a small store-room, awaiting possible torture. Under the pressure of the darkness, isolation and horrified anticipation he gradually breaks down; in a series of long flashbacks, he wonders what brought him to his current state, and in particular, how he lost his freedom.

As a very young child he was happy, despite living in a slum and never knowing his father. He was adopted by the local priest and attended day school and grammar school, where he was torn between two diametrically opposed parent-figures – the kindly science master Nick Shales and the sadistic Rowena Pringle, who taught religious studies. He also fell desperately in love with a girl in his class, Beatrice Ifor. Whilst a student at art college he managed to become Beatrice's fiancé, and eventually her lover, but when she was unable to return his violent passion he grew bored with her and married another woman. After some years he found that Beatrice had gone incurably insane.

The novel alternates these flashbacks with Sammy's increasing terror and despair. Then, just as he loses all self-control and cries for help, he is abruptly released by the camp commandant, who apologises, outraged that an officer should have been humiliated like this.

== Characters ==
- Samuel Mountjoy is the narrator. He is a talented and renowned painter ('I hang in the Tate') but a confused, restless and unhappy man. Despite searching for some meaning in life (for example, by joining the Communist Party) he has never found anything satisfying: 'I have hung all systems on the wall like a row of useless hats. They do not fit... That Marxist hat in the middle of the row, did I ever think it would last me a lifetime? What is wrong with the Christian biretta that I hardly wore at all?' Throughout the book he is constantly wondering where he lost the freedom he remembers as a child:

When did I lose my freedom? For once, I was free... Free-will cannot be debated but only experienced, like a colour or the taste of potatoes. I remember one such experience. I was very small and I was sitting on the stone surround of the pool and fountain in the centre of the park... The gravelled paths of the park radiated from me: and all at once I was overcome by a new knowledge. I could take whichever I would of these paths...

- Doctor Halde is the Gestapo officer who interviews Sammy and has him locked in the store-room. Before the war he was a professor of psychiatry. In the last line of the book, the camp commandant, apologising to Sammy for this humiliating treatment, says 'The Herr Doctor does not know about peoples' – which is ironic, as it's clear that Halde is a highly acute judge of character. One critics comments that “Dr. Halde is an incisive portrait of twentieth-century man whose villainy derives not from some innate absence of spiritual compassion [...] nor from a misunderstanding of his own inner nature (as Nick Shales), but rather from his deliberate choice to sacrifice his spiritual capacity and to serve only his reasoning faculty.”
- Father Watts-Watt is the Anglican priest who adopts Sammy. He has paedophilic impulses which he represses violently and which cause him eventually to sink into paranoia.
- Johnny Spragg is one of Sammy's school friends. He is a simple, extrovert, cheerful child who wants only to become a pilot. He is killed flying in the war. Sammy envies him for his 'natural goodness and generosity'.
- Philip Arnold is Sammy's other main school friend. He is subtle, cunning and cynical (the exact opposite of Johnny). Like Sammy, he is driven to understand the world. He wants to dismiss religion as a mere charade, and persuades Sammy to agree to urinate on the local church altar, to see if there is any 'divine retribution'. (Sammy eventually just spits on it.)
- Beatrice Ifor is the girl with whom Sammy falls in love. She has what seems to him a wonderful calm and self-possession, but eventually it emerges that this is really a result of her mental fragility – she is borderline schizophrenic and eventually breaks down altogether. Sammy, filled with guilt, can never be sure whether their relationship hastened or postponed her mental collapse.
- Rowena Pringle is the religion teacher at Sammy's grammar school. She is a hateful figure: 'She ruled, not by love, but by fear. Her weapons were no cane, they were different, subtle and cruel, unfair and vicious. They were teeny, arch sarcasms that made the other children giggle and tore the flesh...'
- Nick Shales is the science master at Sammy's school. He is a kindly and decent man: 'Nick was the best teacher I ever knew. He had no particular method and gave no particular picture of brilliance; it was just that he had a vision of nature and a passionate desire to communicate it.' Looking back, Sammy decides that the real loss of his freedom occurred when he was forced to choose between the two worlds of science and religion, and chose the rational, scientific one, against his real nature, because Shales was kind to him whilst Miss Pringle was not:-

I do not believe that rational choice stood any chance of exercise. I believe that my child's mind was made up for me as a choice between good and wicked fairies. Miss Pringle vitiated her teaching. She failed to convince, not by what she said, but by what she was. Nick persuaded me to his natural scientific universe by what he was, not by what he said. I hung for an instant between two pictures of the universe; then the ripple passed over the burning bush and I ran towards my friend...
