= The Hot Gates =

Collection of essays by William Golding

First edition, cover art by Michael Ayrton

The Hot Gates is the title of a collection of essays by William Golding, author of Lord of the Flies. The collection is divided into four sections: "People and Places", "Books", "Westward Look" and "Caught in a Bush". Published in 1965, it includes pieces that Golding had written over the previous ten years. "Caught in a Bush" contains his childhood recollections "Billy the Kid" and "The Ladder and the Tree", and his essay "Fable", which answered questions about Lord of the Flies appears in "Books". "Fable" is based on lectures Golding gave at UCLA in California and he hoped it would answer "some of the standard questions which students were asking". The book starts out with an essay on the Battle of Thermopylae, which can be translated from ancient Greek to English as "hot gates", thus giving it the title. The Hot Gates are famous for being the place where Leonidas I made his last stand against the Persian army under Xerxes I.
