= William Golding =

British novelist, poet, and playwright (1911–1993)

Sir William Golding CBE FRSL
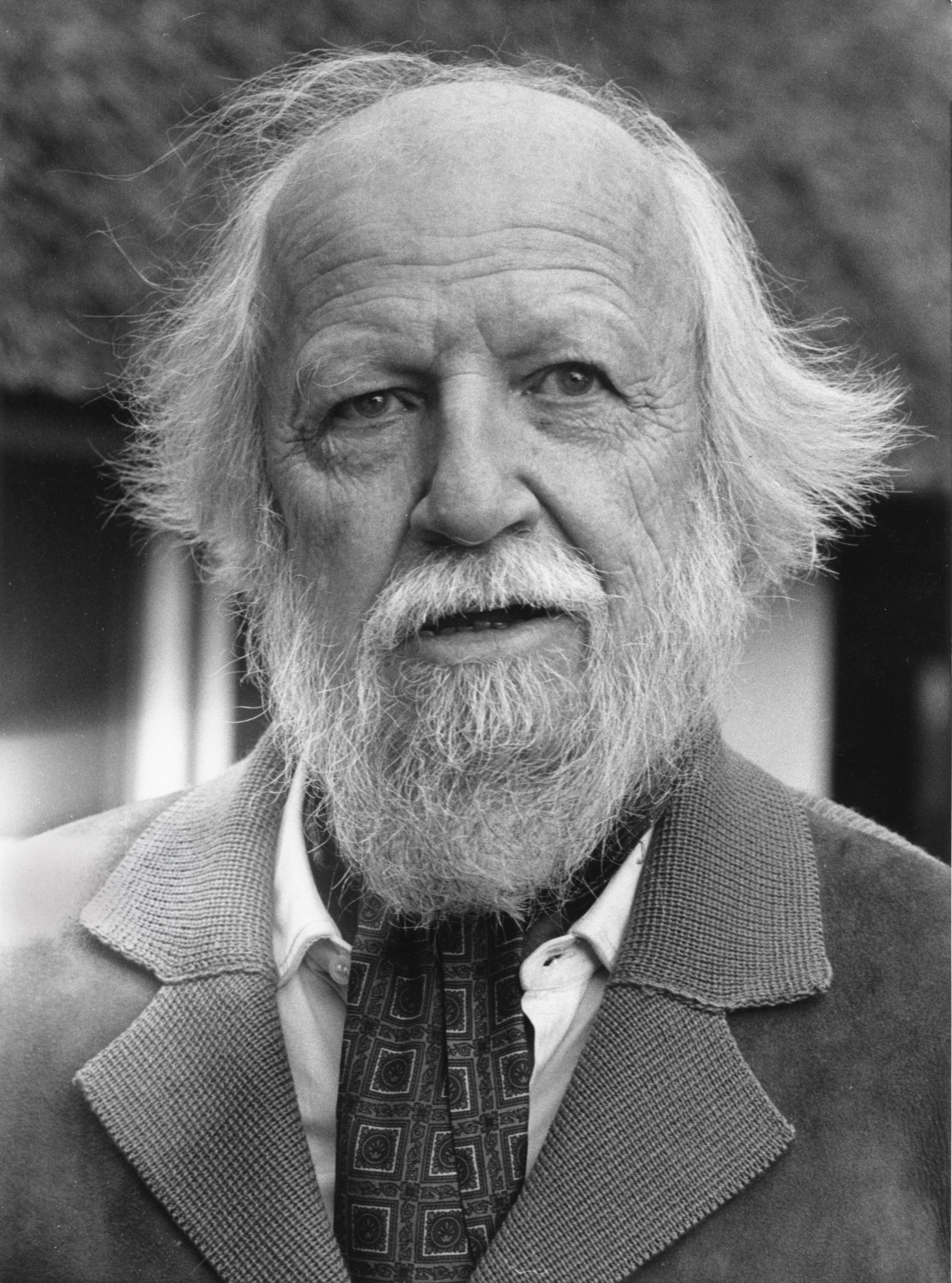
- Golding in 1983
- Born: William Gerald Golding; 19 September 1911; Newquay, Cornwall, England
- Died: 19 June 1993 (aged 81); Perranarworthal, Cornwall, England
- Resting place: Holy Trinity Church, Bowerchalke, Wiltshire
- Education: Brasenose College, Oxford (BA)
- Occupations: Schoolteacher; novelist; playwright; poet
- Writing career
- Genres: Survivalist fiction; robinsonade; adventure; sea story; science fiction; essay; historical fiction; stageplay; poetry
- Notable works: Lord of the Flies; Rites of Passage
- Notable awards: Booker Prize 1980; Nobel Prize in Literature 1983; Knight Bachelor 1988

Sir William Gerald Golding (19 September 1911 – 19 June 1993) was a British novelist, playwright, and poet. Best known for his debut novel Lord of the Flies (1954), Golding published another 12 volumes of fiction in his lifetime. In 1980, Golding was awarded the Booker Prize for Rites of Passage, the first novel in what became his sea trilogy, To the Ends of the Earth. Golding was awarded the 1983 Nobel Prize in Literature.

As a result of his contributions to literature, Golding was knighted in 1988. He was also a fellow of the Royal Society of Literature. In 2008, The Times ranked Golding third on its list of "The 50 greatest British writers since 1945".

== Early life and education ==
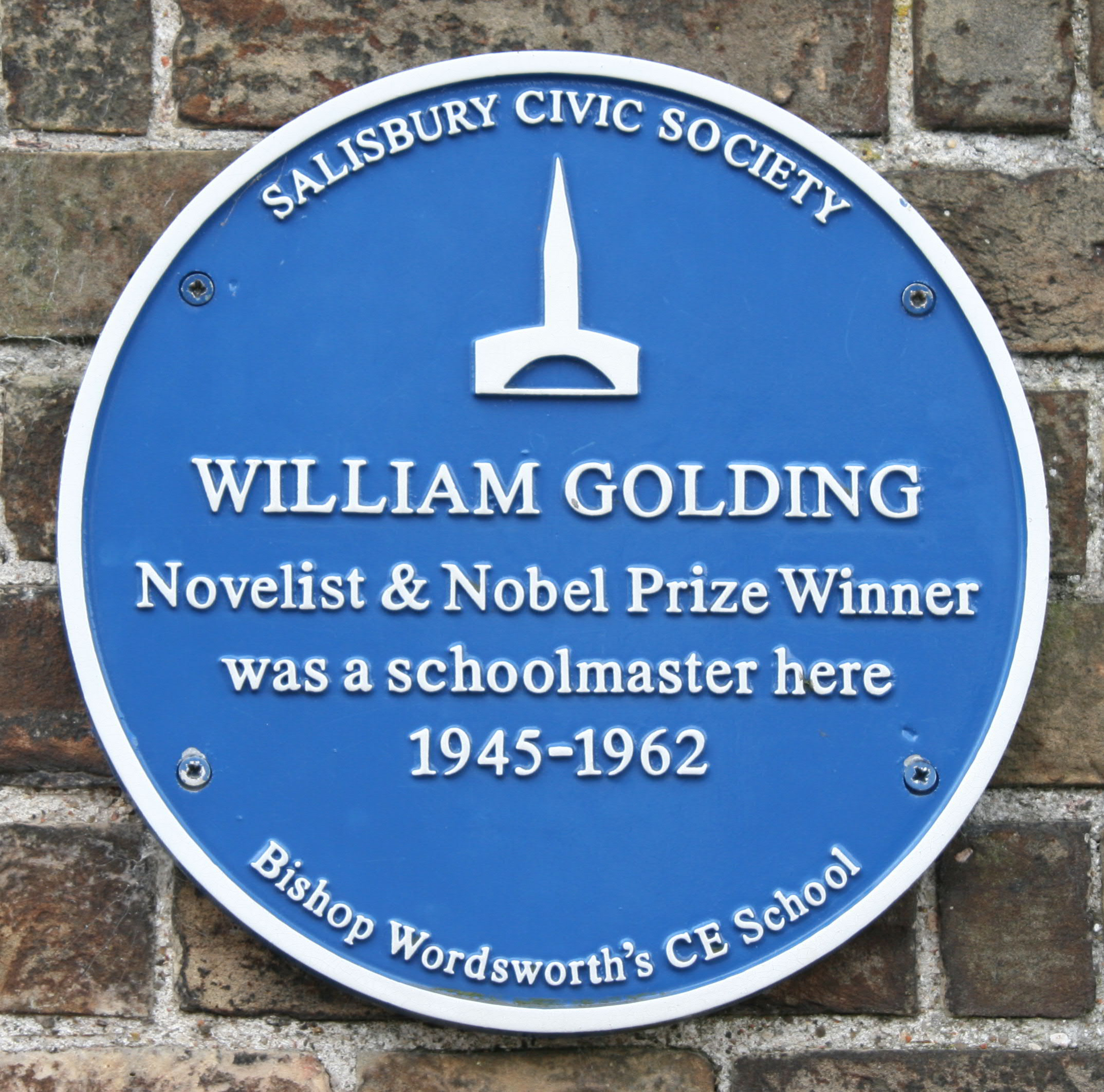
Plaque at Bishop Wordsworth's School, Salisbury.

Son of Alec Golding, a science master at Marlborough Grammar School (1905 to retirement), and Mildred (née Curnoe), William Golding was born on 19 September 1911 at his maternal grandmother's house, 47 Mount Wise, Newquay, Cornwall. The house was known as Karenza, the Cornish word for love, and he spent many childhood holidays there. The Golding family lived at 29, The Green, Marlborough, Wiltshire, and Golding and his elder brother Joseph attended the school where their father taught. Golding's mother was a campaigner for female suffrage. She was Cornish, and was considered by her son "a superstitious Celt" who used to tell him old Cornish ghost stories from her own childhood.

In 1930, Golding went to Brasenose College, Oxford, where he read natural sciences for two years before transferring to English for his final two years. Golding's original tutor was the chemist Thomas Taylor. In a private journal and in a memoir for his wife, Golding admitted that, as a teenager during a vacation, he tried to rape a teenage girl with whom he had previously taken piano lessons, perceiving her to have "wanted heavy sex".

Golding took his B.A. degree with second class honours during the summer of 1934, and later that year a book of his Poems was published by Macmillan & Co, with the help of his Oxford friend, the anthroposophist Adam Bittleston.

In 1935, Golding took a job teaching English at Michael Hall School, a Steiner-Waldorf school then in Streatham, South London, staying there for two years. After a year in Oxford studying for a Diploma of Education, he became a schoolmaster, teaching English and music at Maidstone Grammar School from 1938 to 1940, before moving to Bishop Wordsworth's School, Salisbury, in April 1940. There, Golding taught English, philosophy, Greek, and drama until joining the navy on 18 December 1940, reporting for duty at HMS Raleigh. He returned in 1945 and taught the same subjects until 1961.

Golding kept a personal journal for over 22 years from 1971 until the night before his death; it contained approximately 2.4 million words in total. The journal was initially used by Golding to record his dreams, but over time it began to function as a record of his life. The journals contained insights including retrospective thoughts about Golding's novels and memories from his past. At one point, Golding described setting his students up into two groups to fight each other – an experience he drew on when writing Lord of the Flies. John Carey, an emeritus professor of English literature at Oxford University, was eventually given 'unprecedented access to Golding's unpublished papers and journals by the Golding estate'. Although Golding had not written the journals specifically so that a biography could be written about him, Carey published William Golding: The Man Who Wrote Lord of the Flies in 2009.

=== Military service ===
During World War II, Golding joined the Royal Navy in 1940. He served on a destroyer which was briefly involved in the pursuit and sinking of the German battleship Bismarck. Additionally, Golding participated in the invasion of Normandy on D-Day, commanding a landing craft that fired salvoes of rockets onto the beaches. He was also in action at Walcheren in October and November 1944, during which time 10 out of 27 assault craft that went into the attack were sunk. Golding rose to the rank of lieutenant.

=== Crisis ===
Golding had a troubled relationship with alcohol; his daughter Judy Carver notes that her father was "always very open, if rueful, about problems with drink". Golding suggested that his self-described "crisis", of which alcoholism played a major part, had plagued him his entire life.

John Carey mentions several instances of Golding's binge drinking in his biography, including Golding's experiences in 1963. Whilst on holiday in Greece when he was meant to have been finishing his novel The Spire, Golding would, after working on his writing in the morning, go to his preferred "Kapheneion" to drink at midday. By the evening, he would move on to ouzo and brandy, and developed a reputation locally for "provoking explosions".

Unfortunately, the eventual publication of The Spire the following year did not help Golding's developing struggle with alcohol; it had precisely the opposite effect, with the novel's scathingly negative reviews in a BBC radio broadcast affecting him severely.

Following the publication of The Pyramid in 1967, Golding experienced a severe writer's block, the result of a myriad of crises: family anxieties, insomnia, and a general sense of dejection. Golding eventually became unable to deal with what he perceived to be the intense reality of his life without first drinking copious amounts of alcohol. Tim Kendall suggests that these experiences manifest in Golding's writing as the character Wilf in The Paper Men; "an ageing novelist whose alcohol-sodden journeys across Europe are bankrolled by the continuing success of his first book". By the late 1960s, Golding was hopelessly addicted to alcohol – which he referred to as "the old, old anodyne".

Golding's first steps towards recovery came from his study of Carl Jung's writings, and in what he called "an admission of discipleship," Golding travelled to Switzerland in 1971 to see Jung's landscapes for himself. That same year, Golding started keeping a journal in which he recorded and interpreted his dreams; the last entry is from the day before he died, in 1993, and the work came to be thousands of pages long by this time.

The crisis did inevitably affect Golding's output, and his next novel, Darkness Visible, would be published twelve years after The Pyramid; a far cry from the prolific author who had produced six novels in thirteen years since the start of his career. Despite this, the extent of Golding's recovery is evident from the fact that this was only the first of six further novels that Golding completed before his death.

== Career ==
=== Writing success ===
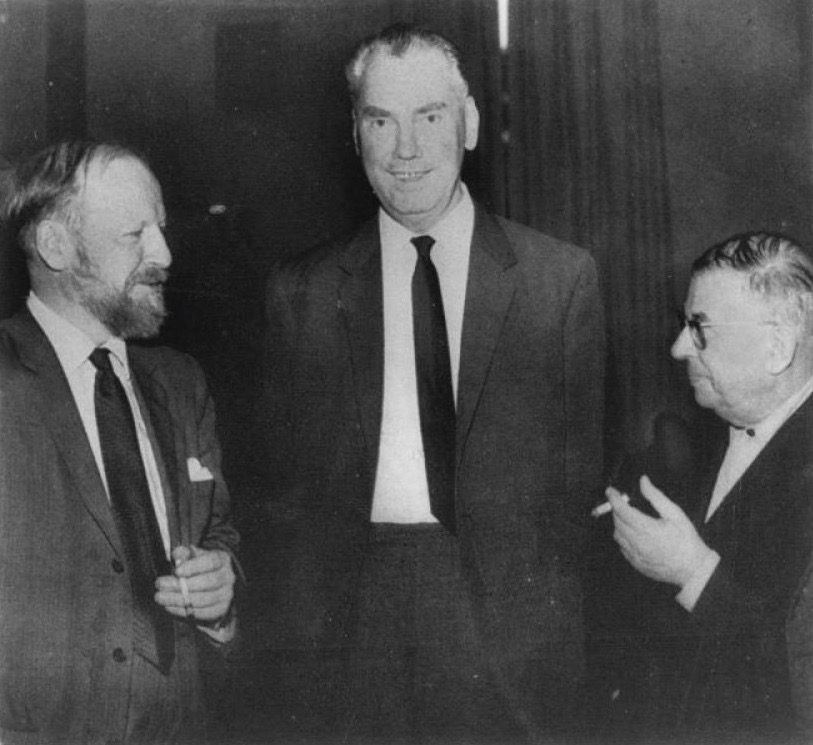
Golding (left), Artur Lundkvist, and Jean-Paul Sartre at a writers' congress in Leningrad, USSR, 1963

In William Golding: A Critical Study (2008), George states that, "Golding experienced two things that he counts the greatest influences on his writing—first, the war and his service in the navy and second, his learning ancient Greek." While still a teacher at Bishop Wordsworth's School, in 1951 Golding began writing a manuscript of the novel initially titled Strangers from Within.

In September 1953, after rejections from seven other publishers, Golding sent a manuscript to Faber and Faber and was initially rejected by their reader, Jan Perkins, who labelled it as "Rubbish & dull. Pointless". However, Golding's book was championed by Charles Monteith, a new editor at the firm. Monteith asked for some changes to the text, and the novel was published in September 1954 as Lord of the Flies.

After moving in 1958 from Salisbury to nearby Bowerchalke, Golding met his fellow villager and walking companion James Lovelock. The two discussed Lovelock's hypothesis, that the living matter of the planet Earth functions like a single organism, and Golding suggested naming this hypothesis after Gaia, the personification of the Earth in Greek mythology, and mother of the Titans. Literary scholar Theo Mantion has argued that Golding's involvement with the Gaia hypothesis extended beyond suggesting its name. According to Mantion, Golding became one of the hypothesis's earliest literary advocates, further developing and defending its ecological implications in essays such as "Gaia Lives, OK?" (1976) and "The Earth's Revenge" (1990). His publishing success made it possible for Golding to resign his teaching post at Bishop Wordsworth's School in 1961, and Golding spent that academic year in the United States as writer-in-residence at Hollins College (now Hollins University), near Roanoke, Virginia.

Golding won the James Tait Black Memorial Prize for Darkness Visible in 1979, and the Booker Prize for Rites of Passage in 1980. Having been appointed Commander of the Order of the British Empire (CBE) in the 1966 New Year Honours, Golding was appointed a Knight Bachelor in the 1988 Birthday Honours. In September 1993, only a few months after his unexpected death, the First International William Golding Conference was held in France.

=== Nobel Prize in Literature ===
In 1983, Golding was awarded the Nobel Prize for Literature "for his novels which, with the perspicuity of realistic narrative art and the diversity and universality of myth, illuminate the human condition in the world of today". It was, according to the Oxford Dictionary of National Biography, "an unexpected and even contentious choice".

=== Fiction ===
Golding's first novel, Lord of the Flies (1954; film, 1963 and 1990; play, adapted by Nigel Williams, 1995; mini-series, 2026), describes a group of boys stranded on a tropical island descending into a lawless and increasingly wild existence before being rescued. The Inheritors (1955) depicts a tribe of gentle Neanderthals encountering modern humans, who by comparison are deceitful and violent. His 1956 novel Pincher Martin records the thoughts of a drowning sailor. Free Fall (1959) explores the question of freedom of choice. The novel's narrator, a World War Two soldier in a German POW Camp, endures interrogation and solitary confinement. After these events and while recollecting the experiences, he looks back over the choices he has made, trying to trace precisely where he lost the freedom to make his own decisions. The Spire (1964) follows the construction (and near collapse) of an impossibly large spire on the top of a medieval cathedral (generally assumed to be Salisbury Cathedral).

Golding's 1967 novel, The Pyramid, consists of three linked stories with a shared setting in a small English town based partly on Marlborough where Golding grew up. The Scorpion God (1971) contains three novellas, the first set in an ancient Egyptian court ("The Scorpion God"); the second describing a prehistoric African hunter-gatherer group ("Clonk, Clonk"); and the third in the court of a Roman emperor ("Envoy Extraordinary"). The last of these, originally published in 1956, was reworked by Golding into a play, The Brass Butterfly, in 1958. From 1971 to 1979, Golding published no novels. After this period he published Darkness Visible (1979): a story involving terrorism, paedophilia, and a mysterious figure who survives a fire in the Blitz and appears to have supernatural powers.

In 1980, Golding published Rites of Passage, the first of his novels about a voyage to Australia in the early nineteenth century. The novel won the Booker Prize in 1980 and Golding followed this success with Close Quarters (1987) and Fire Down Below (1989) to complete his 'sea trilogy', later published as one volume entitled To the Ends of the Earth. In 1984, he published The Paper Men: an account of the struggles between a novelist and his would-be biographer.

== Personal life ==
Golding was engaged to Mollie Evans, a woman from Marlborough, who was well liked by both of his parents. However, he broke off the engagement and married Ann Brookfield, an analytical chemist, on 30 September 1939. They had two children: David (born September 1940) and Judith (born July 1945). The novelist, screenwriter and producer Simon William Golding was a distant cousin of William Golding.

== Death ==
In 1985, Golding and his wife moved to a house called Tullimaar in Perranarworthal, near Truro, Cornwall. He died of heart failure eight years later on 19 June 1993, at age 81. Golding's body was buried in the parish churchyard of Bowerchalke near his former home and the Wiltshire county border with Hampshire and Dorset.

Golding left the draft of a novel, The Double Tongue, set in ancient Delphi, which was published posthumously in 1995.

== List of works ==
=== Poetry ===
- Poems (1934)

=== Drama ===
- The Brass Butterfly (1958)

=== Novels ===
- Lord of the Flies (1954)
- The Inheritors (1955)
- Pincher Martin (1956)
- Free Fall (1959)
- The Spire (1964)
- The Pyramid (1967)
- Darkness Visible (1979) (James Tait Black Memorial Prize)
- To the Ends of the Earth (trilogy)
  - Rites of Passage (1980) (Booker Prize)
  - Close Quarters (1987)
  - Fire Down Below (1989)
- The Paper Men (1984)
- The Double Tongue (posthumous publication 1995)

=== Collections ===
- The Scorpion God (1971)
  - "The Scorpion God"
  - "Clonk Clonk"
  - "Envoy Extraordinary"
- William Golding: The Faber Letters (posthumous publication 2025)

=== Non-fiction ===
- The Hot Gates (1965)
- A Moving Target (1982)
- An Egyptian Journal (1985)

=== Unpublished works ===
- Seahorse was written in 1948. It is a biographical account of sailing on the south coast of England in the summer of 1947 and contains a short passage about being in training for D-Day.
- Circle Under the Sea is an adventure novel about a writer who sails to discover archaeological treasures off the coast of the Scilly Isles.
- Short Measure is a novel set in a British school akin to Bishop Wordsworth's.

== Audiobooks ==
- 2005: Lord of the Flies (read by the author), Listening Library, ISBN 978-0-307-28170-8

== See also ==
- H. Taprell Dorling
- An Occurrence at Owl Creek Bridge

== General and cited sources ==
- Carey, Professor John (2009). William Golding: The Man Who Wrote Lord of the Flies. New York: Simon & Schuster. ISBN 978-1-4391-8732-6.
- Carey, Professor John (2009). William Golding: The Man Who Wrote Lord of the Flies. London: Faber and Faber Limited. ISBN 978-0-571-23163-8.
- Kendall, Tim (October 2018). "William Golding's Great Dream". Essays in Criticism. 68 (4): 466–487 – via Oxford Academic.
