= The Pyramid (Golding novel) =

1967 novel by William Golding

- First edition
- Author: William Golding
- Language: English
- Publisher: Faber & Faber
- Publication date: 1967
- Publication place: United Kingdom
- Media type: Print (Hardback & Paperback)

The Pyramid (1967) is a novel by the English author William Golding.

== Plot ==
It describes the experiences of growing up in the 1920s in a small market town in England of the narrator, Oliver. It tells three separate stories from his childhood, resolving them many years later. All three stories end with Oliver seeing the other main character for the last time.
