= Tim Kendall =

English poet, editor and critic

Tim Kendall (born 1970) is an English poet, editor and critic. He was born in Plymouth. In 1994 he co-founded the magazine Thumbscrew, which published work by poets including Ted Hughes, Seamus Heaney and Miroslav Holub, and which ran under his editorship until 2003. In 1997 he won an Eric Gregory Prize for his poetry. His first collection of poems, Strange Land, was published in 2005.

In 2006 he became Professor of English at the University of Exeter.

He has published critical studies of Paul Muldoon, Sylvia Plath, and most recently, English war poetry. He was heavily involved in literary events marking the centenary of the outbreak of World War I.

== Works ==
- Sylvia Plath: A Critical Guide (Faber & Faber, 2001)
- Strange Land (Carcanet, 2004)
- The Oxford Handbook of British and Irish War Poetry (ed; Oxford University Press, 2007)
- Modern English War Poetry (Oxford University Press, 2009)
- Poetry of the First World War: An Anthology (ed; Oxford University Press, 2013)
- The Art of Robert Frost (Yale University Press, 2013)

== Television ==
- Ivor Gurney: The Poet who Loved the War (BBC4, 2014)

== Bibliography ==
Thumbscrew
