= Darkness Visible (novel) =

1979 novel by British author William Golding

- First edition cover
- Author: William Golding
- Cover artist: Russell Drysdale "The Rainmaker"
- Language: English
- Publisher: Faber & Faber
- Publication date: 1979
- Publication place: UK
- Media type: Print
- Pages: 265
- ISBN: 0-571-11646-9
- OCLC: 5754188

Darkness Visible is a 1979 novel by British author William Golding. The book won the James Tait Black Memorial Prize. The title comes from Paradise Lost, from the line, "No light, but rather darkness visible". It marked Golding's re-emergence as a novelist, eight years after the publication of the collection The Scorpion God.

== Synopsis ==
The novel narrates a struggle between good and evil, using naïveté, sexuality and spirituality.

A dark and complex novel, it centres on Matty, introduced in chapter one as a naked child emerging horribly disfigured from a bomb explosion during the London Blitz in World War II. He becomes a ward of the state and is put into a boarding school, where he is shunned by all. When he grows up, however, his selfless kindness and mysterious persona attract a devoted following who believe him to be a saint.

The second part of the book centers on twins Toni and Sophy from the point of view of Sophy. Their story starts from their childhood, when they are around 10 years old, and follows their growth as they become young adults.

The recurring theme in these two stories is madness, Matty split between his two faces, and schizoid Sophy as she is split between her sister and others.
