= A Moving Target =

First edition

A Moving Target is a collection of essays and lectures written by William Golding. It was first published in 1982 by Faber and Faber but subsequent reprints included Golding's Nobel Prize lecture which he gave after being awarded the honour in 1983.

The book is divided into the two sections of "Places" and "Ideas".
