= Geoff Crewdson =

English RL coach and former GB international rugby league footballer (1938–2022)

Personal information
- Born: 27 June 1938
- Died: 28 January 2022 (aged 83)

Playing information
- Position: Prop
Club
Years	Team	Pld	T	G	FG	P
1955–69	Keighley	288
1969–75	Hunslet / New Hunslet	128
	Total	416	0	0	0	0

Geoff Crewdson (27 June 1938 – 5 February 2022) was an English professional rugby league footballer who played in the 1950s, 1960s and 1970s. He played at club level for Keighley and Hunslet, and represented Great Britain on their 1966 tour of Australia and New Zealand.

== Playing career ==
=== Keighley ===
Crewdson was signed by Keighley in December 1955, and made his debut later that season. He went on to make 288 appearances for the club.

=== Hunslet ===
Crewdson joined Hunslet in August 1969. When the club re-formed as New Hunslet in 1973, he was named as the club's captain. Between 1969 and 1975, he made a combined total of 128 appearances for Hunslet and New Hunslet.

=== Representative honours ===
While at Keighley, Crewdson was selected for the 1966 Great Britain tour of Australia and New Zealand. He played 12 games on the tour, but did not appear in any Test matches.

== Honours ==
In 1999, Crewdson was an inaugural inductee in Keighley's Rugby League Hall of Fame.
