= Charles Fox (scientist) =

English Quaker scientist (1797–1878)

Charles Fox (22 December 1797 – 18 April 1878) was a Quaker scientist known for his contributions to Cornish mining. He also developed Trebah Garden, near Mawnan Smith in Cornwall. He was a member of the influential Fox family of Falmouth.

Fox was a partner in the family shipping brokerage, at Falmouth and General Manager of the Perran Iron Foundry at Perranarworthal from 1825, handing over the post to his nephew Barclay Fox around 1842 He was also active in various other family business enterprises, including copper mining and smelting in Cornwall and South Wales.

The Fox family played a large part in the establishment of the Royal Cornwall Polytechnic Society at Falmouth. Charles Fox was its president in 1871–72. In 1841, in connection with the society, he founded the Lander prizes for maps and essays on geographical districts.

With Robert Hunt, Charles Fox helped to found in 1859 the Miners' Association of Cornwall and Devon. He was president of the Royal Geological Society of Cornwall in 1863–67. He contributed a number of articles on diverse topics to learned and scientific journals.

== Life ==
Charles Fox was born in Falmouth on 22 December 1797, the son of Robert Were Fox and Elizabeth Fox (née Tregelles, daughter of Joseph Tregelles of Falmouth). He was educated at home. He became a partner in the firm of G. C. and R. W. Fox & Co., merchants and shipping agents at Falmouth, and was also a partner in the Perran Foundry Company at Perranarworthal, Cornwall, where from 1824 to 1847 he was the manager of the foundry and the engine manufactory.

Based on a plan to set up The Falmouth Polytechnic Society originated by Anna Maria Fox at the age of seventeen, Charles was one of the projectors and founders of what became the Royal Cornwall Polytechnic Society at Falmouth in 1835, following being granted a Royal warrant by King William the IV and, in conjunction with Sir Charles Lemon, led the way to a movement which resulted in the offer of a premium of £100. for the introduction of a man-engine into Cornish mines, the result of which was the erection by Michael Loam of the first man-engine at Tresavean mine in 1842. This machine was a great success, and its invention has been the means of saving much unnecessary labour to the tin and copper miners in ascending and descending the mine shafts. He was president of the Polytechnic Society for 1871 and 1872, in connection with which institution he founded in 1841 the Lander prizes for maps and essays on geographical districts. He was president of the Royal Geological Society of Cornwall from 1864 to 1867, and president of the Miners' Association of Cornwall and Devon from 1861 to 1863. He interested himself particularly in such discoveries, philological and antiquarian, as tended to throw light on Bible history, and with this object in view he visited Palestine, Egypt, and Algiers. In all branches of natural history he was deeply read, making collections and examining with the microscope the specimens illustrative of each department.

On the introduction of boring machines into mines he was one of the first to recognise their use, and as early as 1867 he wrote papers on this subject. He made many communications to the three Cornish societies, as well as to the Mining Journal and Hardwicke's Science Gossip. Extracts from the Spiritual Diary of John Rutty, M.D., was edited by Fox in 1840, and in 1870 he wrote a small work, On the Ministry of Women. He was largely interested in Cornish mines throughout his life, and latterly was much impoverished by the failure of the greater number of these undertakings. For the last twenty-five years of his life he resided at Trebah, near Falmouth, and died there 18 April 1878, and was buried in the Friends' cemetery at Budock 23 April.

He married, 20 December 1825, Sarah, only daughter of William Hustler. She was born at Apple Hall, Bradford, Yorkshire, 8 August 1800, and died at Trebah 19 February 1882. Her writings were: A Metrical Version of the Book of Job, 1852–4; Poems, Original and Translated, 1863; Catch who can, or Hide and Seek, Original Double Acrostics, 1869; and "The Matterhorn Sacrifice, a Poem", in Macmillan's Magazine, 1865. Their daughter Juliet married Edmund Backhouse, who was MP for Darlington and a wealthy banker. Another daughter died in childhood.

== Quaker faith ==
His generation and the next of the Fox family were active in the Religious Society of Friends, regularly attending Monthly, Quarterly and Yearly Meetings. Charles Fox was one of the Committee appointed by London Yearly Meeting in May 1871 to deal with the outbreak of "modern thought" in Manchester Quaker Meeting. The Committee arranged for the disownment of David Duncan, the outspoken leader of the Manchester dissidents and published a "Declaration of some fundamental principles of Christian Truth", which was, however, rejected by Yearly Meeting 1872. The Declaration was an antecedent of the Richmond Declaration.

He shared with other Quakers an interest in Prison Reform. To this end, he visited prisons in France, Germany and Switzerland. He was an advocate of temperance. He visited Palestine in 1855.
