= Charles Monteith =

British literary editor

Charles Montgomery Monteith (9 February 1921 – 9 May 1995) was a British literary editor. He was born in Lisburn, County Antrim, and won a scholarship to Magdalen College, Oxford where he earned a Double First. He fought in World War Two, serving in India and Burma with the Royal Inniskilling Fusiliers, and was badly injured. Returning home, he qualified as a barrister at Gray's Inn in 1949.

He joined Faber & Faber in 1954 at the urging of Geoffrey Faber who, like Monteith, was a Fellow of All Souls College. He worked at Faber for 26 years, and was responsible for publishing, among others, William Golding, Samuel Beckett, John Osborne, Ted Hughes, Seamus Heaney, P. D. James, Philip Larkin, Wilson Harris, John Hearne, Thom Gunn, Jean Genet and Alan Bennett.
