= John Carey (critic) =

British literary critic (1934–2025)

John Carey FBA FRSL
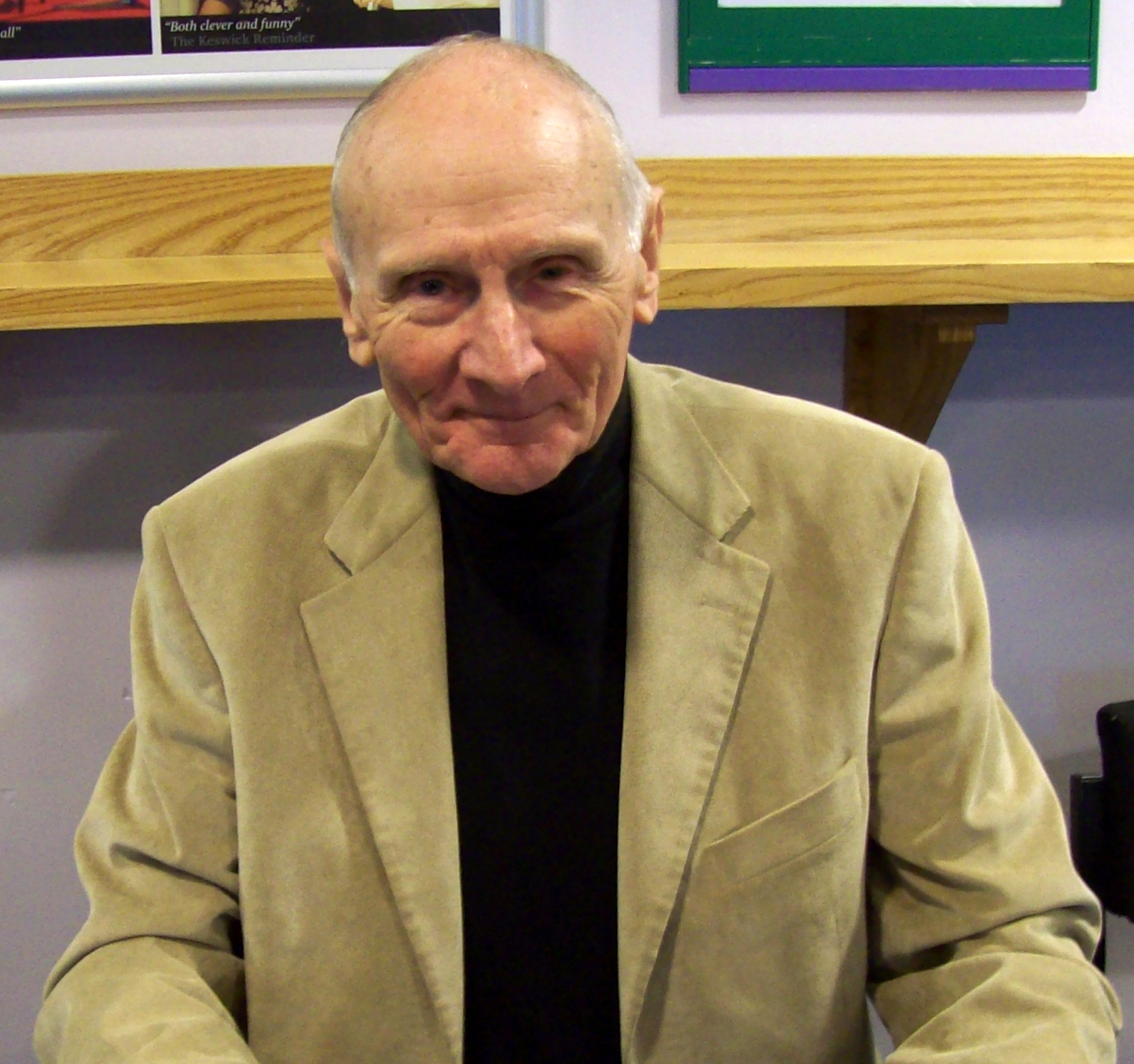
- Carey in 2014
- Born: 5 April 1934; Barnes, Surrey, England
- Died: 11 December 2025 (aged 91); Oxford, England
- Education: St John's College, Oxford
- Occupation: Author, academic, literary critic
- Spouse: Gill Booth (m. 1960)
- Children: 2
- Writing career
- Language: English
- Notable works: The Intellectuals and the Masses; What Good are the Arts?

John Carey (5 April 1934 – 11 December 2025) was a British literary critic, and post-retirement (2002) emeritus Merton Professor of English Literature at the University of Oxford. He was a scholar on John Milton and he also published a number of books on various literary figures. He became known for his anti-elitist views on high culture, as expounded in several books such as The Intellectuals and the Masses and What Good Are the Arts? Carey twice chaired the Booker Prize committee, in 1982 and 2003, and chaired the judging panel for the first Man Booker International Prize in 2005.

== Early life ==
Carey was born in Barnes, then in Surrey, on 5 April 1934, the youngest of four children born to Charles W. Carey and Winifred E. Carey, née Cook. The family moved to Radcliffe-on-Trent in Nottinghamshire, where he attended Becket Grammar School and then West Bridgford Grammar, before returning to London in 1947, when he was educated at Richmond and East Sheen Boys' Grammar School. He won an Open Scholarship to St John's College, Oxford, but served 18 months of National Service with the East Surrey Regiment in Egypt before going to Oxford in 1954. His tutor at Oxford was JB Leishman. He received a congratulatory first in English literature in 1957. He continued his study with a DPhil at Merton College, writing a thesis on Ovid.

== Career ==
Carey remained in Oxford his entire career and held posts in a number of Oxford colleges. He had a one-year lectureship at Christ Church, followed by a junior fellowship at Balliol, and a fellowship at Keble in 1960, before transferring to St John's in 1964. He was Merton Professor of English Literature at Merton in 1975, before retiring in 2002 and became an emeritus fellow.

Carey first became known as a scholar on John Milton. He translated Milton's De doctrina Christiana, and edited collections of his poems. He also wrote books on other literary figures, including Charles Dickens (The Violent Effigy), William Makepeace Thackeray (Thackeray: Prodigal Genius), John Donne (John Donne: Life, Mind and Art), as well as a biography of William Golding (William Golding: The Man Who Wrote Lord of the Flies). In 1992, he wrote his critique of the intellectual elite in The Intellectuals and the Masses: Pride and Prejudice among the Literary Intelligentsia 1880-1939. This was followed by What Good are the Arts? in 2005. Other works included A Little History of Poetry and 100 Poets: A Little Anthology.

Carey started reviewing books for The New Statesman in 1974, then The Listener, followed by The Sunday Times from 1977 until 2023. He compiled a number of anthologies, including The Faber Book of Reportage, The Faber Book of Science, which was shortlisted for the 1996 Rhône-Poulenc Prize, and The Faber Book of Utopias.

Carey was also active in the broadcast media. He was a panellist on BBC Radio 3's Critics' Forum from the mid-1970s until 1990, and a reviewer on BBC 2's Late Review.

He was elected a Fellow of the Royal Society of Literature in 1982, and a Fellow of the British Academy in 1996.

== Literary criticism ==
Carey's scholarly work is generally agreed to be influential. Among these productions is his co-edition, with Alastair Fowler, of the Poems of John Milton (Longman, 1968; revised 1980; 2nd ed. 2006); John Donne: Life, Mind, and Art (Faber and Faber, 1981; revised 1990), a revolutionary study of Donne's work in the light of his life and family history; and The Violent Effigy: A Study of Dickens's Imagination (1973; 2nd ed. 1991).

He twice chaired the Booker Prize committee, in 1982 and 2004, and chaired the judging panel for the first Man Booker International Prize in 2005. From 1977 to 2023, he was chief book reviewer for the London Sunday Times. He also appeared in radio and TV programmes including Saturday Review and Newsnight Review.

== Views ==
Carey was known for his anti-elitist views on high culture, as expressed for example in his book What Good Are the Arts? (2005). Carey's 1992 book The Intellectuals and the Masses: Pride and Prejudice among the Literary Intelligentsia, 1880–1939 was a critique of Modernist writers (particularly T. S. Eliot, Virginia Woolf, W. B. Yeats, D. H. Lawrence and H. G. Wells) for what Carey argues were their elitist and misanthropic views of mass society; in their place he called for a reappraisal of Arnold Bennett, "the hero of this book", whose "writings represent a systematic dismemberment of the intellectuals' case against the masses". In his review of the book Geoff Dyer wrote that Carey picked out negative quotations from his subjects, while Stefan Collini responded that disdain for mass culture among some Modernist writers was already well known among literary historians.

== Memoir ==
In 2014, Carey published a memoir The Unexpected Professor. It comprised distinct parts; childhood in wartime and the era of rationing, schooling, national service in the army; the academic career and scholarly study; his later period of book reviewing and literary journalism.

The early career described his first encounters with poetry, among them Milton, Jonson, Donne, Browning. The book contained crisp critical summaries of prose writers, among them Thackeray, Lawrence and Orwell.

== Personal life and death ==
Carey married Gillian Booth in 1960. They had two sons. He was, for decades, a beekeeper. He died in Oxford on 11 December 2025, at the age of 91.

== Works ==
- The Poems of John Milton (1968) editor with Alastair Fowler
- Andrew Marvell: A Critical Anthology (1969) editor
- The Private Memoirs and Confessions of a Justified Sinner by James Hogg (1969) editor
- John Milton (1969)
- Complete Shorter Poems of John Milton (1971), revised 2nd edition (1997) editor
- The Violent Effigy. A Study of Dickens' Imagination (1973) published in America as Here Comes Dickens. The Imagination of a Novelist. Republished in Faber Finds (2008)
- John Milton, Christian Doctrine (1971) translator
- Thackeray: Prodigal Genius (1977) republished in Faber Finds (2008)
- English Renaissance Studies: Presented To Dame Helen Gardner In Honour Of Her Seventieth Birthday (1979)
- John Donne: Life, Mind and Art (1981) new revised edition (1990) republished in Faber Finds (2008)
- William Golding : The Man and His Books (1986) editor
- Faber Book of Reportage (1987) editor. Published in America as Eyewitness to History, Harvard University Press, (1987)
- Original Copy : Selected Reviews and Journalism 1969–1986 (1987)
- John Donne. The Major Works (1990) editor, Oxford Authors, reprinted with revisions (2000) World's Classics
- The Intellectuals and the Masses: Pride and Prejudice among the Literary Intelligentsia, 1880–1939 (1992)
- Short Stories and the Unbearable Bassington by Saki (1994) editor
- Faber Book of Science (1995) editor. Published in America as Eyewitness to Science: Scientists and Writers Illuminate Natural Phenomena from Fossils to Fractals, Harvard University Press, (1997)
- Selected Poetry of John Donne (1998) editor
- Faber Book of Utopias (2000) editor
- Pure Pleasure: a Guide to the Twentieth Century's Most Enjoyable Books (2000)
- George Orwell, Essays (2002) editor and introduction :xv-xxxi. Knopf
- Vanity Fair by William Thackeray (2002) editor
- What Good are the Arts? (2005)
- William Golding: The Man Who Wrote 'Lord of the Flies' (2009)
- The Unexpected Professor: An Oxford Life in Books (2014)
- The Essential 'Paradise Lost' (2017)
- A Little History of Poetry, Yale University Press (2020)
- 100 Poets: A Little Anthology, Yale University Press (2021)
- Sunday Best: 80 Great Books from a Lifetime of Reviews, Yale University Press (2022)
