= List of Cornish scientists =

This is a list of scientists from Cornwall, a county of England, in the United Kingdom.

== Biologists ==
- Henry Charlton Bastian, physiologist and neurologist
- Lieutenant-Colonel Frederick Nicholson Betts, Indian Army officer and ornithologist
- George Carter Bignell, entomologist
- William Borlase, naturalist, geologist and antiquary, Rector of Ludgvan
- William Clift, naturalist and Fellow of the Royal Society
- Jonathan Couch, naturalist and physician
- Richard Quiller Couch, naturalist
- Frederick Hamilton Davey, botanist
- Jean Golding, epidemiologist
- Henry Brougham Guppy, naturalist and botanist
- Charles Alexander Johns, botanist and clergyman
- Oscar Kempthorne, statistician and geneticist
- William Lobb, plant collector
- John Keast Lord, veterinarian and naturalist
- Richard Lower, blood transfusion pioneer
- John Mayow, physiologist
- William Noye of Paul, entomologist
- Francis Polkinghorne Pascoe, entomologist
- John Ralfs, botanist
- Edward Hearle Rodd, ornithologist
- Henry Harpur Spry (1804 – 1842), army medical officer in India and naturalist
- John Coulson Tregarthen, naturalist
- Ethelwynn Trewavas, ichthyologist
- Sir Richard Vyvyan, Bart, MP for Cornwall and scientist
- William Wagstaff, ornithologist and naturalist
- Elizabeth Andrew Warren, botanist

== Earth scientists ==
- William Borlase, naturalist, geologist and antiquary, Rector of Ludgvan
- Edward Budge, geologist and clergyman
- Elizabeth Carne, geologist and philanthropist
- Joseph Carne, geologist, industrialist and Fellow of the Royal Society
- Richard Edmonds, geologist and antiquary
- Robert Were Fox, geologist
- William Gregor, discoverer of titanium and clergyman
- John Hawkins, geologist, traveller
- Robert Hunt, mineralogist and writer
- Matthew Paul Moyle, meteorologist and mining writer
- Charles William Peach, naturalist and geologist
- Benjamin Neeve Peach, geologist
- William Pengelly, geologist and archaeologist
- John Arthur Phillips, geologist, metallurgist, mining engineer

== Physical scientists ==
- John Couch Adams, co-discoverer of the planet Neptune
- Herbert Stanley Allen, physicist
- Edmund Davy, chemist
- Sir Humphry Davy, 1st Baronet, chemist and inventor
- Edwin Dunkin, President of the Royal Astronomical Society and the Royal Institution of Cornwall
- Antony Hewish, astronomer
- Sir William Lower (1570 – 1615), astronomer and Member of Parliament
- William Oliver, inventor of the Bath Oliver and a founder of the Royal Mineral Water Hospital at Bath
- Roy Sambles, physicist

== Others ==
- Lancelot Stephen Bosanquet, mathematician
- Davies Gilbert, applied mathematician and technocrat, President of the Royal Society
- John Hellins, mathematician, curate of Constantine
- Sheila Oates Williams (born 1939), Australian mathematician

== See also ==
- List of Cornish engineers and inventors
