= List of Cornish engineers and inventors =

This is a list of engineers and inventors from Cornwall, England, United Kingdom.

- John Arnold, watchmaker and pioneer of the marine chronometer
- William Bickford, inventor of the safety fuse
- Joseph Henry Collins, mining engineer, mineralogist and geologist
- Sir John Coode, civil engineer
- William Cookworthy, discoverer of china clay (kaolinite) in Cornwall
- Sir Humphry Davy, scientist, inventor and President of the Royal Society
- John Samuel Enys (1796 – 1872), mining engineer and scientist
- Sir Goldsworthy Gurney, inventor of limelight
- Jonathan Hornblower, inventor of the compound engine and the steam valve
- William Husband, civil and mechanical engineer
- Thomas Brown Jordan, engineer
- Michael Loam, inventor of the man engine
- Sir Thomas Matthews, civil engineer and builder of lighthouses
- William Murdoch, engineer, inventor and sometime Cornish resident
- Andrew Pears, inventor of transparent soap
- William Westcott Rundell, inventor and engineer from Falmouth
- Adrian Stephens, inventor of the steam whistle
- Richard Tangye, engineer
- John Taylor, inventor of the Cornish rolls
- Joseph Thomas, architect and civil engineer
- Joseph Treffry, engineer and industrialist
- Henry Trengrouse, inventor of a rocket-powered maritime rescue system
- Richard Trevithick, inventor, engineer and builder of the first steam locomotive
- Robert Trewhella (1830-1909; it:Robert Trewhella), railway engineer and contractor
- Andrew Vivian, Trevithick's cousin and collaborator, and captain of Dolcoath Mine
- Arthur Woolf, inventor of the high pressure compound steam engine

== See also ==
- List of Cornish scientists and inventors
