= Magnetic deviation =

Compass error induced by local fields

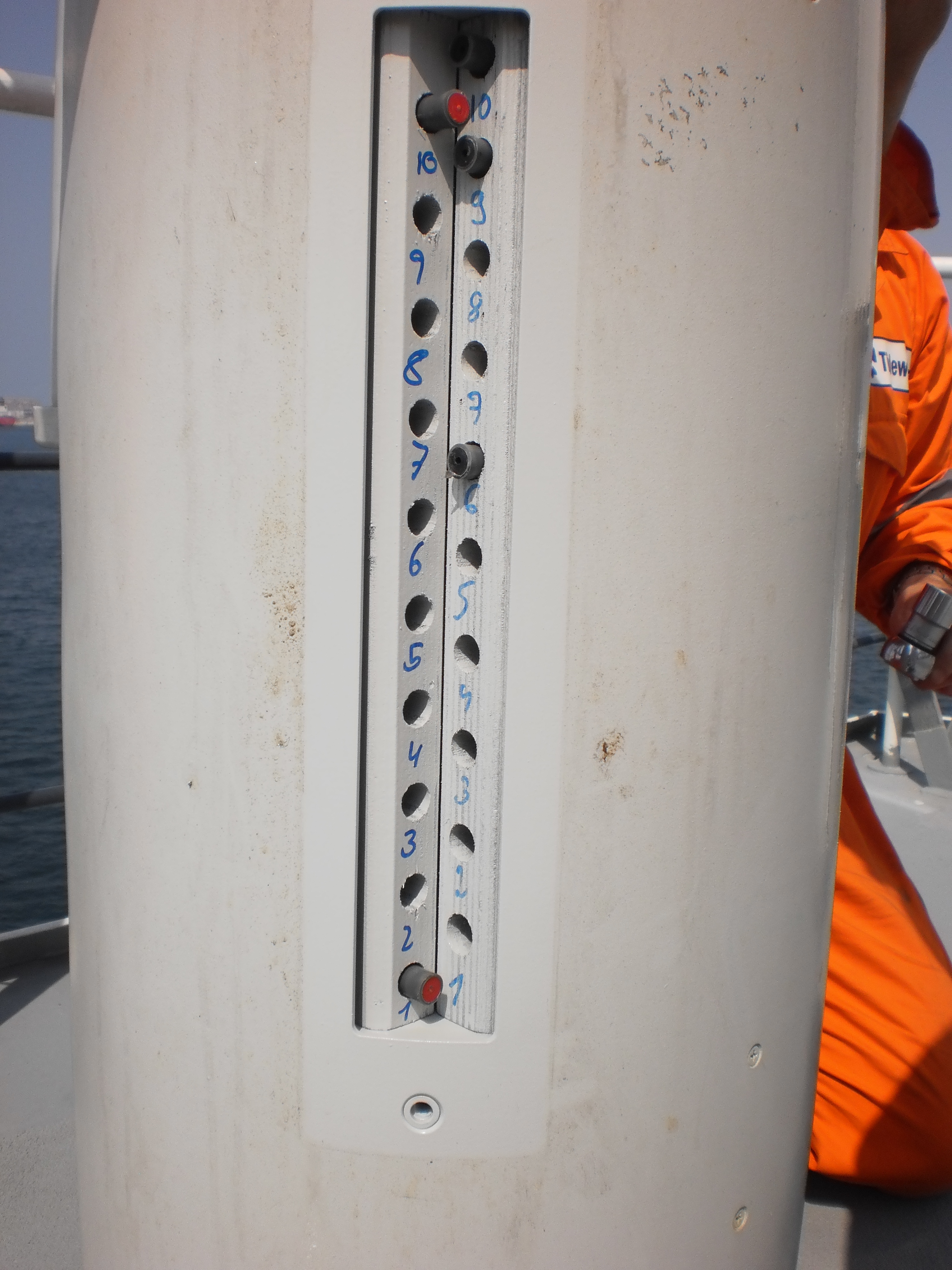
Slots for small magnets in a binnacle. The magnets are positioned to reduce the effect of the ship's permanent magnetization on the compass.

Magnetic deviation is the compass error caused by local magnetic fields generated by nearby ferrous materials or electrical equipment, which distort the Earth's magnetic field in the vicinity of the compass. It is a local effect: the amount and direction of deviation depend on the specific location of the compass within a vessel, aircraft, or vehicle, and can vary even within the same craft. If not corrected, deviation can lead to inaccurate bearings.

Magnetic declination (also called variation) is the angular difference between magnetic north and true north. It is a separate source of compass error from magnetic deviation.

The term magnetic deviation is sometimes used loosely to mean magnetic declination, but in navigation and engineering contexts it refers specifically to the local error described above.

== Compass readings ==
Compasses are used to determine the direction of true North. However, the compass reading must be corrected for two effects. The first is magnetic declination or variation—the angular difference between magnetic North (the local direction of the Earth's magnetic field) and true North. The second is magnetic deviation—the angular difference between magnetic North and the compass needle due to nearby sources of interference such as magnetically permeable bodies, or other magnetic fields within the field of influence.

== Sources ==
In navigation manuals, magnetic deviation refers specifically to compass error caused by magnetised iron or steel within a ship or aircraft. This material exhibits a combination of permanent magnetisation and temporary (induced) magnetisation generated by the Earth's magnetic field. The induced component varies with the orientation of the craft relative to the Earth's field, making precise correction more challenging.

The deviation caused by a vessel's structure can be reduced by carefully placing small permanent magnets and soft-iron compensators near the compass. To counteract induced magnetisation, two magnetically soft iron spheres commonly known as Kelvin's balls are mounted on adjustable arms on either side of the binnacle. This method was developed by Lord Kelvin in the late 19th century and became a standard feature in marine navigation. Because a vessel's magnetic signature changes gradually over time and with geographic position, the compensating magnets must be periodically readjusted to maintain accuracy. Magnetic compass adjustment and correction is one of the topics covered in the examination curriculum for a shipmaster's certificate of competency.

Deviation characteristics are unique to each compass installation and are independent of geographic location, allowing calibration for specific conditions. This calibration is typically documented on a compass correction card. In the mid-19th century, Archibald Smith developed mathematical expressions for deviation, showing it could be represented as a Fourier series with a limited number of coefficients, enabling systematic correction tables.

Additional causes of deviation include nearby electrical equipment, ferrous tools, or even other compasses placed in close proximity. In iron and steel ships of the late 19th and early 20th centuries, engineers such as William Westcott Rundell conducted systematic deviation measurements and produced graphical deviation curves (dygograms) for various vessels.

Non magnetic navigation methods such as the gyrocompass, astronomical navigation, satellite navigation (e.g., GPS), or radio navigation are unaffected by magnetic deviation. Comparing bearings from these systems with a magnetic compass reading is a standard way to determine local deviation.

== History ==
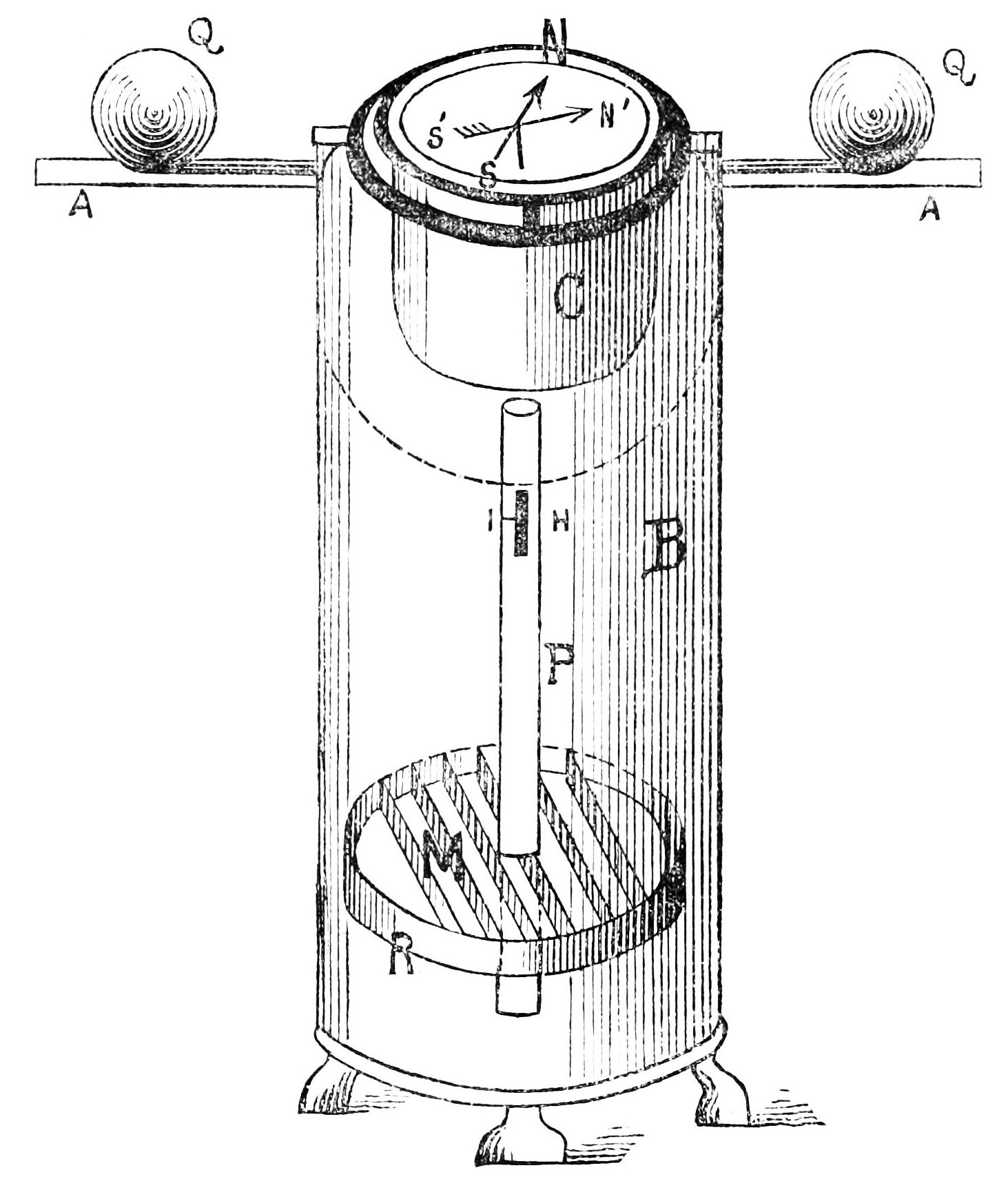
Diagram of a 19th-century binnacle housing a compass. It has two soft iron spheres (Q) to correct for induced magnetization.

Sailing ships generally had two kinds of compasses: steering compasses, two of which would be mounted in a binnacle in front of the helm for use in maintaining a course; and a bearing compass that was used for taking the bearings of celestial objects, landmarks and the ship's wake. The latter could be moved around the ship, and it was soon observed that the bearing could vary from one part of the ship to another. The explorer Joao de Castro was the first to report such an inconsistency, in 1538, and attributed it to the ship's gun. Many other objects were found to be sources of deviation in ships, including iron particles in brass compass bowls; iron nails in a wooden compass box or binnacle; and metal parts of clothing. The two steering compasses themselves could interfere with each other if they were set too close together. The "bearing compass" was eventually sited in a fixed position in a binnacle with, as far as possible, an all round view and acquired the name "standard compass". It would nonetheless have a different deviation from the "steering compass", so the compass heading shown on the "steering compass" would be different from the compass heading shown on the "standard compass".

The source of deviation could not always be identified. To reduce this source of error, which was due to induced magnetization in the ship, the surveyor John Churchman proposed a solution known as swinging the ship in 1794. This involved measuring the magnetic deviation as the ship was oriented in several compass directions. These measurements could then be used to correct compass readings. This procedure became standard practice in the 19th century as iron became an increasing component of ships.

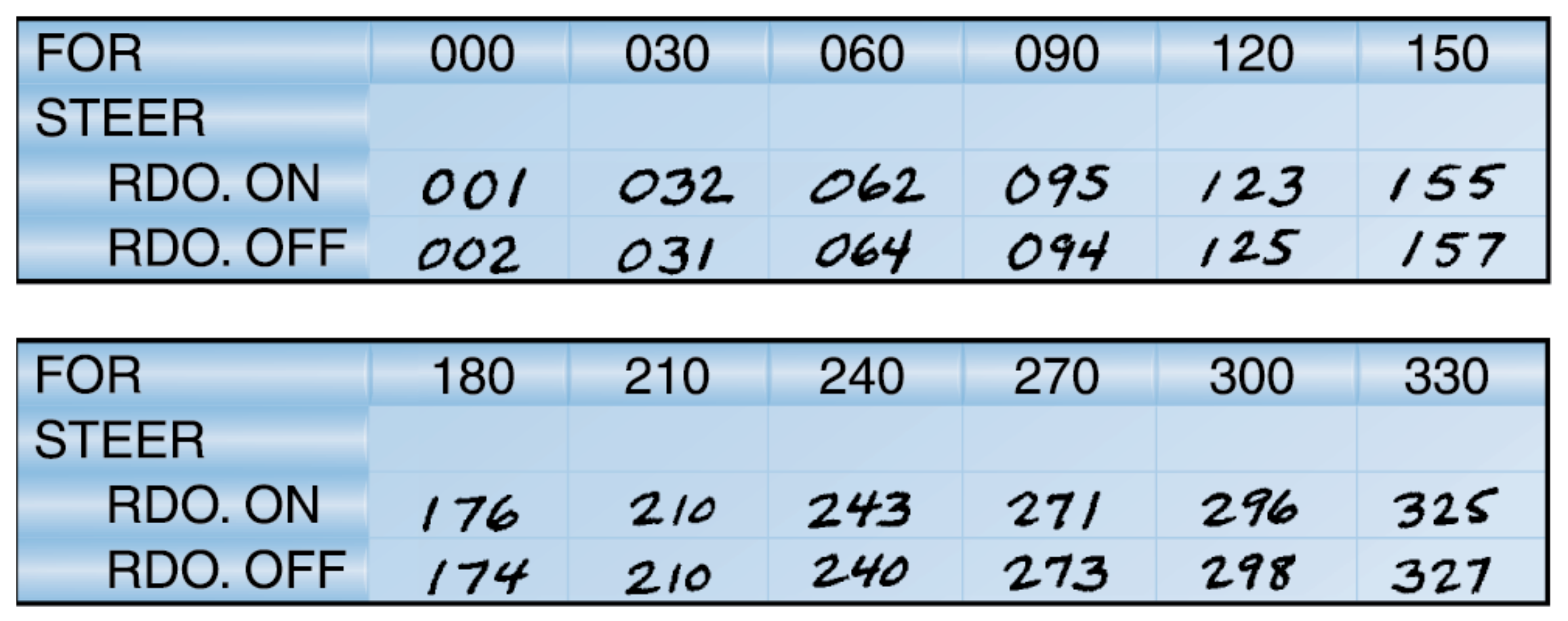
A sample compass correction card, showing the deviation correction for a given heading

Once the compass has been corrected using small magnets fitted in the base and with soft iron balls, any residual deviation is recorded as a table or graph: the compass correction card, which is kept on board near the compass.

Archibald Smith in 1862 published Admiralty Manual for ascertaining and applying the Deviations of the Compass caused by the Iron in a Ship. The key insight is that the deviation can be written as a Fourier series in the magnetic heading with terms up to the second frequency components. This means that only five numbers are required to be estimated to determine the full deviation card. This method is still used by professional compass correctors who are employed to correct the compass and produce a deviation card.

== See also ==
- Circumferentor § Surveying a region
- Heading (navigation) § TVMDC
- Local attraction – Disturbing influence to a compass
