= Emily Stackhouse =

Botanical artist 1811–1870

- Born: 15 July 1811
- Died: 1 April 1870 (aged 58)
- Known for: Illustration
- Style: Botanical art

Emily Stackhouse (15 July 1811 – 1 April 1870) was a 19th-century British botanical artist and plant collector. She collected and painted flowers and mosses throughout the British isles, and her work was widely reproduced in a series of popular books issued by the Society for Promoting Christian Knowledge. Many of her watercolours show that she had collected and depicted specific plants years earlier than their accredited discovery in Cornwall, and it is now acknowledged that she collected and classified nearly all of the British mosses.

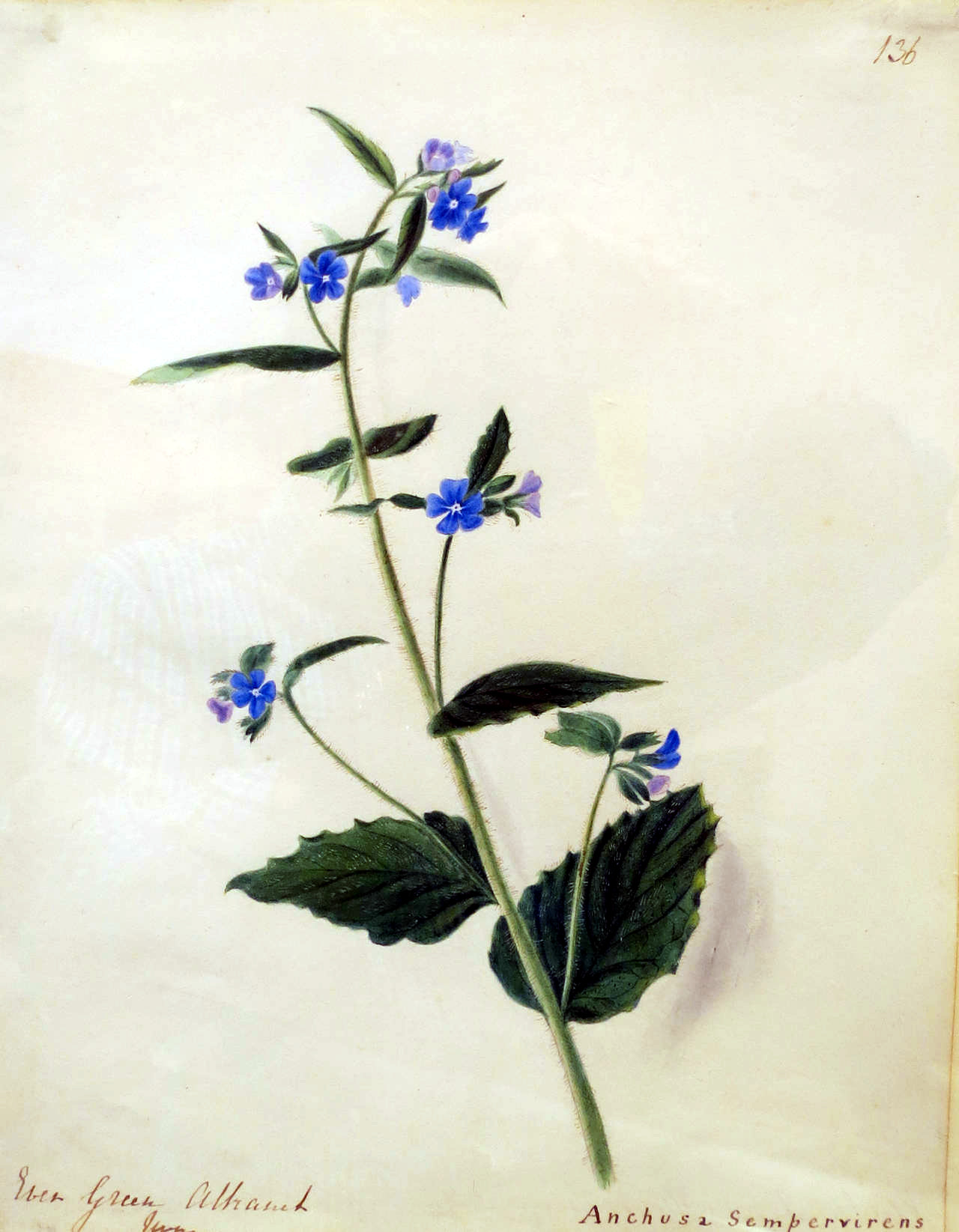
Ever Green Alkanet - Anchusa Semperviren by Stackhouse

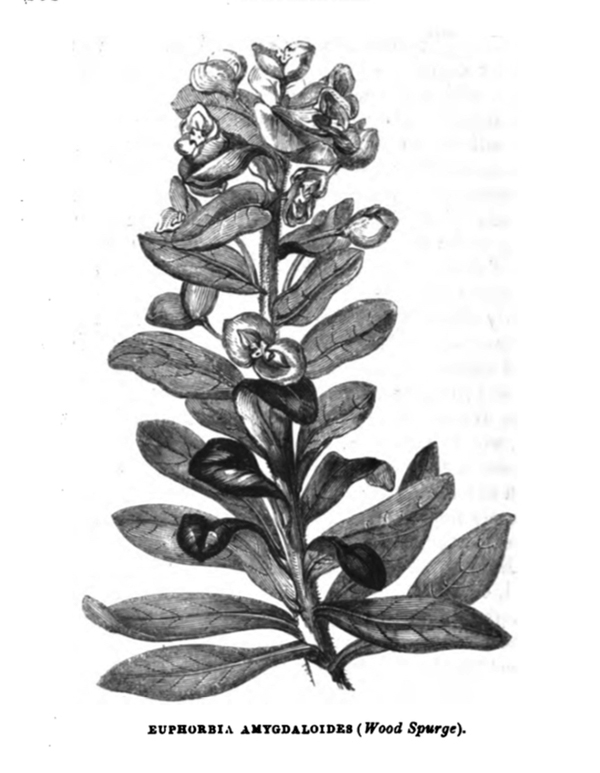
Euphorbia amygdaloides or wood spurge by Stackhouse for Flowers of the Field

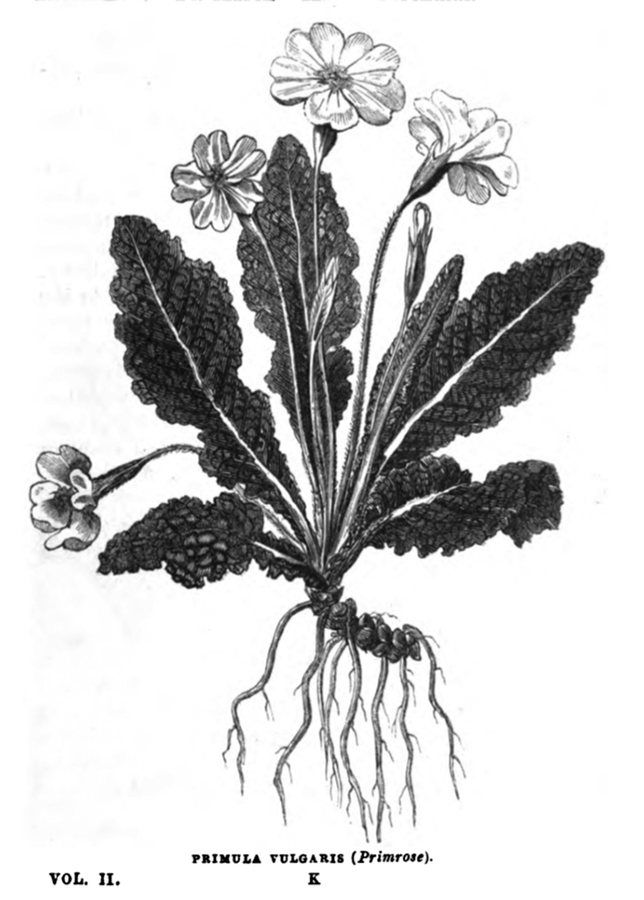
Primula vulgaris or primrose by Stackhouse for Flowers of the Field

== Family ==
Emily Stackhouse was born on 15 July 1811 in Modbury, Devon, one of six children of Rev. William Stackhouse III and Sarah Stackhouse. The Stackhouses were an old Cornish family that included several naturalists; her great-uncle was the botanist John Stackhouse. Emily may have lived for a time with her second cousin Frances Stackhouse Acton, a botanist and botanical artist whose father Thomas Andrew Knight was also a botanist. She also frequently stayed with William Rashleigh, a Member of Parliament and naturalist who was married to her aunt.

In 1830, Emily's father inherited Trehane, a large estate with a Queen Anne mansion, and a few years later the family settled there. The manor house burned to the ground in 1946, but the estate's home farm, Trehane Barton, is now a listed Site of Special Scientific Interest. Among Stackhouse's neighbours near Trehane were the amateur botanists John and Mary Esther Hawkins; the latter was the granddaughter of botanist Humphry Sibthorp.

== Botanical work ==
Stackhouse painted more than 620 watercolours of plants from nature and assembled collections of mosses, flowers, and grasses, traveling all over the British Isles to do so. Her paintings are noted for their precision of detail and accuracy of colour. Each is inscribed with both the English and Latin names of the plant and usually the location and date. Many of her watercolours show that she had collected and depicted specific plants years earlier than their accredited discovery in Cornwall.

In 1846 and again in 1853, her botanical watercolours won a bronze medal in the natural history competition of the Royal Cornwall Polytechnic Society's annual exhibition.

Sometime in the mid 1840s, the botanist Charles Alexander Johns saw Stackhouse's watercolours and asked her to provide illustrations for a series of popular natural history books that he was publishing through the Society for Promoting Christian Knowledge. The first two were Forest Trees of Britain (1847) and A Week at the Lizard (1848, focusing on the Lizard peninsula in Cornwall); in both, some of the illustrations were engravings based on watercolours by Stackhouse, uncredited, but signed 'E.S.' This was followed by Johns's best-known book, Flowers of the Field, published in two volumes in 1851 with over 200 uncredited illustrations by Stackhouse. Referred to as "the bible of the amateur botanist," its success was such that it went into more than 50 editions and was still in print a century after it first came out. In addition, after Johns and Stackhouse were dead, the SPCK continued to use Stackhouse's images in other books; it is estimated that they had been printed in at least 15 and as many as 30 different books by the end of the 19th century.

Stackhouse later offered many of her drawings to the botanist and Kew Gardens director William Hooker for his use.

Stackhouse's eyesight began to fail in the late 1850s, after which she shifted her attention to collecting plants. Stackhouse supplied specimens to the botanist Elizabeth Andrew Warren for a planned herbarium of Cornish plants. She classified and then donated to the British Museum of Natural History a collection of grasses that had come to her from a nephew in India. She collected mosses and wrote about them in the Journal of the Royal Institution of Cornwall. It was later acknowledged that she had collected and classified "virtually every British moss."

In this period, she also had her entire collection of watercolours bound into three volumes.

Stackhouse suffered a stroke and paralysis in 1869 and died a year later, on 1 March 1870 in Truro, Cornwall.
