= Plants in Middle-earth =

Theme in Tolkien's fiction

Tolkien's drawing of ranalinque, the Quenya name for his invented "moon-grass", in a style reminiscent of Art Nouveau. He professed himself fascinated by plant forms.

The plants in Middle-earth, the fictional continent in the world devised by J. R. R. Tolkien, are a mixture of real plant species with fictional ones. Middle-earth was intended to represent Europe in the real world in an imagined past, and in many respects its natural history is realistic.

The botany and ecology of Middle-earth are described in sufficient detail for botanists to have identified its plant communities, ranging from Arctic tundra to hot deserts, with many named plant species, both wild and cultivated.

Scholars such as Walter S. Judd, Dinah Hazell, Tom Shippey, Matthew T. Dickerson, and Christopher Vaccaro have noted that Tolkien described fictional plants for reasons including his own interest in plants and scenery, to enrich his descriptions of an area with beauty and emotion, to fulfil specific plot needs, to characterise the peoples of Middle-earth, and to carry symbolic meaning.

== Context ==
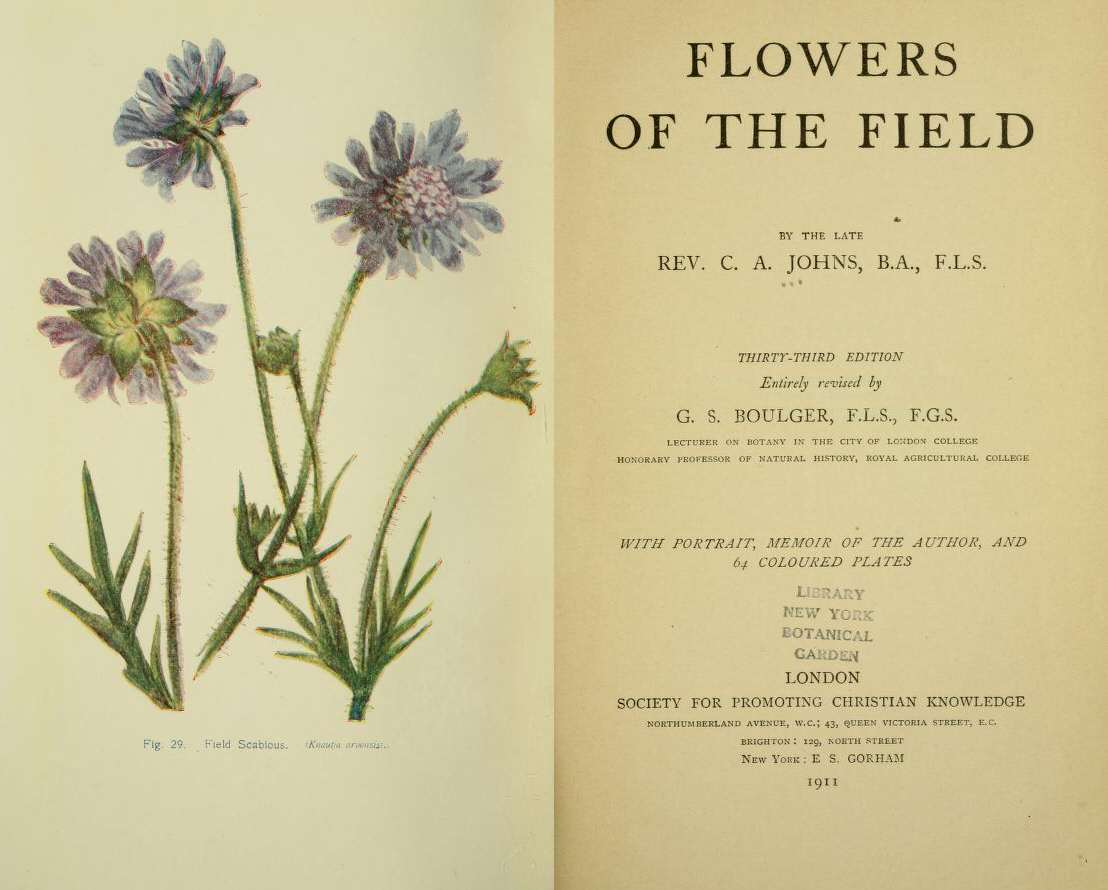
C. A. Johns's Flowers of the Field was Tolkien's "most treasured volume".

=== Tolkien and plants ===
J. R. R. Tolkien learnt about plants, their history and cultivation from his mother, from his reading, from visiting show gardens, by gardening, and by studying medieval herbals, which taught him about the lore and supposed magical properties of certain plants. He stated that the book that most influenced him as a teenager was C. A. Johns's Flowers of the Field, a flora of the British Isles, which he called his "most treasured volume".

He explained that he was intrigued by the diversity of plant forms, as he had a "special fascination ... in the variations and permutations of flowers that are the evident kin of those I know". Among his artworks are a series of paintings of grasses and other plants, often with the names he gave them in Quenya, one of his invented Elvish languages. These could be realistic or, as with his pencil and ink drawing of ranalinque or "moon-grass", stylized, in the manner of Art Nouveau.

=== Europe and Middle-earth ===
Tolkien imagined Arda as the Earth in the distant past.

Tolkien intended Arda to represent the real world in an imagined past, thousands of years before the present time. (Note: Carpenter 2023, Letter 183 notes on W. H. Auden's review of The Return of the King, 1956) He made clear the correspondences in latitude between Europe and Middle-earth, establishing the presence of both British and Mediterranean zones:

The action of the story takes place in the North-west of 'Middle-earth', equivalent in latitude to the coastlands of Europe and the north shores of the Mediterranean. ... If Hobbiton and Rivendell are taken (as intended) to be at about the latitude of Oxford, then Minas Tirith, 600 miles south, is at about the latitude of Florence. The Mouths of Anduin and the ancient city of Pelargir are at about the latitude of ancient Troy. (Note: Carpenter 2023, Letter 294 to Charlotte and Denis Plimmer, 8 February 1967)

== Literary functions ==
In his Middle-earth writings, Tolkien mentions real plant species, and introduces fictional ones, for a variety of reasons. Dinah Hazell describes the botany of Middle-earth as being "the best, most palpable example" of Tolkien's realistic subcreation of a secondary world. In her view, this at once serves a "narrative function, provides a sense of place, and enlivens characterization", while studying the flora and their associated stories gives the reader a deeper appreciation of Tolkien's skill.

=== Realism ===
Ithilien in March

Ithilien, the garden of Gondor now desolate kept still a dishevelled dryad loveliness.

Many great trees grew there, ... and groves and thickets there were of tamarisk and pungent terebinth, of olive and of bay; and there were junipers and myrtles; and thymes that grew in bushes, ... sages of many kinds putting forth blue flowers, or red, or pale green; and marjorams and new-sprouting parsleys, and many herbs of forms and scents beyond the garden-lore of Sam. The grots and rocky walls were already starred with saxifrages and stonecrops. Primeroles and anemones were awake in the filbert-brakes; and asphodel and many lily-flowers nodded their half-opened heads ... Great ilexes of huge girth stood dark and solemn in wide glades ... and there were acres populous with the leaves of woodland hyacinths: (Note: Tolkien 1954, book 4, ch. 7 "Journey to the Cross-Roads")

Tolkien mentions many plants appropriate to the geographical and climatic zones through which his characters pass, especially in The Lord of the Rings, the accurate plant ecology conveying a strong sense of the reality of Middle-earth. Scholars such as Matthew Dickerson, Jonathan Evans, and Walter S. Judd with Graham Judd, have described the botany and ecology of Middle-earth in some detail, from the agriculture of the Shire to the horticulture of the Elves, the wildwood of the Ents, and the polluted volcanic landscape of Mordor. Walter and Graham Judd have examined the Middle-earth flora and its various plant communities from Arctic tundra to hot deserts, have listed and illustrated the many identifiable plant species from alders to yews, not forgetting cultivated plants from beans to flax, and have provided identification keys to the plants and flowering herbs involved.

The Shire is described as a fertile agricultural region, able to produce not only the food needed by its comfortable population, complete with Gaffer Gamgee's "taters" (potatoes), but cultivated mushrooms, wine such as the delicious Old Winyards, and tobacco. Nearby Bree indeed uses botanical names for many of its people, such as the "doubly botanical" name of the innkeeper Barliman Butterbur, named for barley (the chief ingredient of beer), and the butterbur, a large stout wayside herb of Northwestern Europe. Other plant-based surnames in Bree include Ferny, Goatleaf, Heathertoes, Rushlight, Thistlewool, and Mugwort. (Note: Tolkien 1975, pp. 155–201)

Towards the end of their quest, the hobbit protagonists Frodo and Sam travel through the Mediterranean vegetation of Ithilien, giving Tolkien the opportunity to demonstrate the "breadth of his botany" with convincing details of that region's mild climate and different flora. The scholar Richard Jenkyns has commented that "Ithilien is Italy, as the name implies".

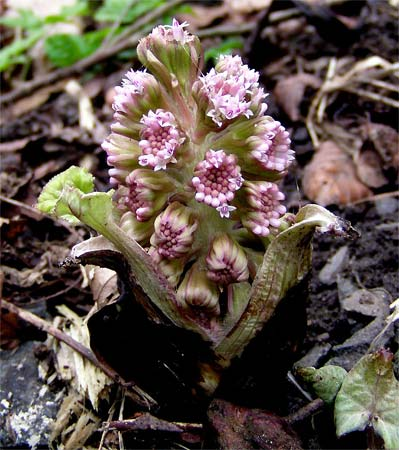
People in Bree often had botanical names; Barliman Butterbur is named for the butterbur, Petasites hybridus, a large stout herb of Northwestern Europe

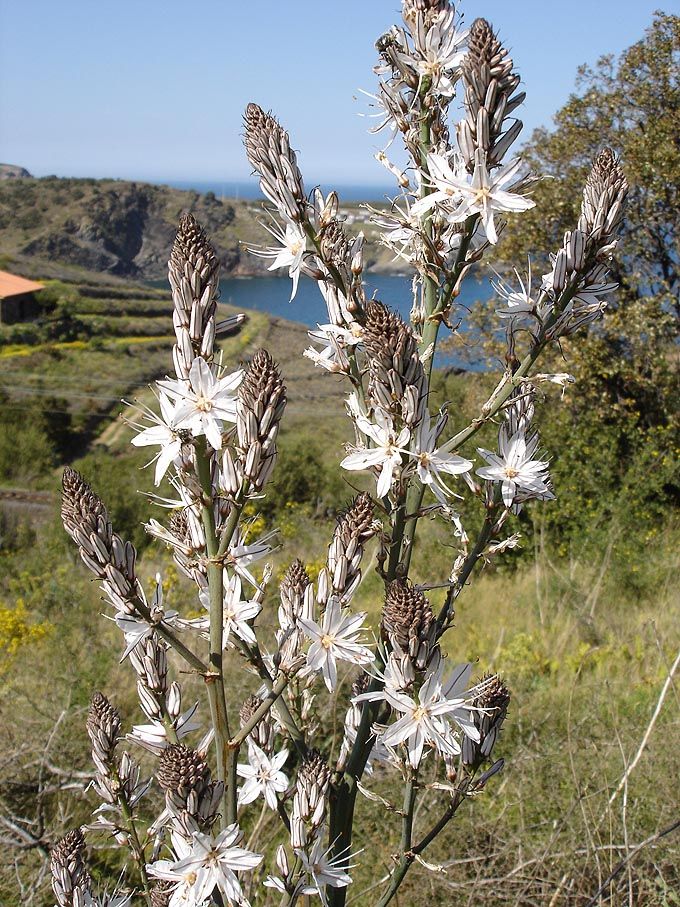
Asphodel, one of the Mediterranean herbs found in Ithilien

=== Narrative and plot ===
Athelas

'These leaves', he said, 'I have walked far to find; for this plant does not grow in the bare hills; but in the thickets away south of the Road I found it in the dark by the scent of its leaves.' He crushed a leaf in his fingers, and it gave out a sweet and pungent fragrance. 'It is fortunate that I could find it, for it is a healing plant that the Men of the West brought to Middle-earth. Athelas they named it, and it grows now sparsely and only near places where they dwelt or camped of old; ... It has great virtues, but over such a wound as this its healing powers may be small.'
He threw the leaves into boiling water and bathed Frodo's shoulder. The fragrance of the steam was refreshing, and those that were unhurt felt their minds calmed and cleared. The herb had also some power over the wound, for Frodo felt the pain and also the sense of frozen cold lessen in his side. (Note: Tolkien 1954a, book 1, ch. 12 "Flight to the Ford")

Some plants fulfil a specific plot need, such as with athelas, a healing plant that turns out to be the cure for the Black Breath, the chill and paralysis that overcame people who fought against the Ringwraiths, Sauron's most deadly servants. In The Lord of the Rings, Athelas is used only by Aragorn, who becomes King of Gondor, explaining its common name, Kingsfoil. (Note: Tolkien 1955, book 5, ch. 8 "The Houses of Healing") Shippey remarks that Aragorn the healer-king echoes a real English King, Edward the Confessor. Tolkien may have had the Old English Herbarium in mind with the healing herb Kingsfoil: in that text, Kingspear (woodruff) is said to have a distinctive aroma, and to be useful for healing wounds, while the ending in -foil, meaning "leaf", is found in the names of herbs such as cinquefoil.

=== Sense of place ===
One reason was to enrich his descriptions of an area with beauty and emotion, such as with the small white Niphredil flowers and the gigantic Mallorn trees with green and silver leaves in the Elvish stronghold of Lothlórien, symbolising indeed Galadriel's Elves. (Note: Tolkien 1954a, book 2, ch. 6 "Lothlórien") Similarly, when describing the Island of Númenor, lost beneath the waves before the time of The Lord of the Rings, Tolkien introduces Oiolairë, an evergreen fragrant tree said to be highly esteemed by the people there. (Note: Tolkien 1980, "A Description of the Island of Númenor") Or again, when describing the grave-mounds of the Kings of Rohan, Tolkien mentions Simbelmynë (Old English for "Evermind"), a white Anemone that once grew in Gondolin and that stands for remembrance of the noble and brave Riders of Rohan. (Note: Tolkien 1954, book 3, ch. 6 "The King of the Golden Hall") David Galbraith of the Royal Botanical Gardens (Ontario) writes that "plants are ... crucial in imagined landscapes", and that few of these are as rich in detail as Tolkien's Middle-earth", where "the plants ranged from simple and familiar to exotic and fantastic".

=== Characterisation ===
Tolkien mentions plant products, too, when he wishes to characterise a people. In the Prologue to The Lord of the Rings, he explains that "pipe-weed", tobacco, is derived from "a strain of the herb Nicotiana", and that the Hobbits of the Shire love to smoke it, unlike the other peoples of Middle-earth. He goes into some detail on this, naming the varieties Longbottom Leaf, Old Toby, and Southern Star, grown in the Shire, and Southlinch from Bree. (Note: Tolkien 1954a, "Prologue") (Note: Tolkien 1955, book 6, ch. 7 "Homeward Bound") This has a personal ring, as Tolkien loved to smoke a pipe, and indeed described himself as a Hobbit: "I am in fact a Hobbit (in all but size). I like gardens, trees, and unmechanized farmlands; I smoke a pipe, ... I am fond of mushrooms (out of a field)". (Note: Carpenter 2023, Letter 213 to Deborah Webster, 25 October 1958)

=== Obsessive interest ===
Hollin ("Land of Holly")

The travellers reached a low ridge crowned with ancient holly-trees whose grey-green trunks seemed to have been built out of the very stone of the hills. Their dark leaves shone and their berries glowed red in the light of the rising sun. (Note: Tolkien 1954a Book 2, ch. 3 "The Ring Goes South")

The scholar Patrick Curry states that "Tolkien obviously had a particular affection for flora", noting that the birch was his "personal 'totem'". Tom Shippey writes that Tolkien's many mentions of plants reveal a deep and continuous interest:

Through all his work moreover there runs an obsessive interest in plants and scenery, pipeweed and athelas, the crown of stonecrop round the overthrown king's head in Ithilien, the staffs of lebethron-wood with a "virtue" on them of finding and returning, given by Faramir to Sam and Frodo, the holly-tree outside Moria that marks the frontier of 'Hollin' as the White Horse of Uffington shows the boundary of the Mark [in England], and over all the closely visualised images of dells and dingles and Wellinghalls, hollow trees and clumps of bracken and bramble-coverts for the hobbits to creep into.

=== Identity of man and nature ===
Shippey comments that Tolkien's strongest belief, visible as a theme in much of his writing, is the identity of man and nature; he gives multiple examples:

Inseparability of Man and Nature, according to Tom Shippey
Person or Group	Associated place	Notes
Tom Bombadil	River Withywindle (Old Forest)	"Not at all" separable
Fangorn (Treebeard)	Fangorn Forest	Character and forest share the name; "as character, he voices more strongly than anybody else the identity of name and namer and thing," giving him "a kind of magic".
Hobbits	The Shire	"Only just separable from the Shire"; the almost magical effect is "created by simple harmony".
Riders of Rohan	Simbelmynë flowers	The flower symbolizes the Riders.
Elves of Lothlórien	Mallorn trees	The tree symbolizes the Elves.

=== Symbolism ===
Plants could also have symbolic significance in Tolkien's Middle-earth writings. Christopher Vaccaro writes in Mallorn that the White Tree of Gondor in The Lord of the Rings symbolises the return of the King to Gondor, the fresh sapling replacing the dead tree as Aragorn replaces the Stewards sitting in the King's place. The sapling, in turn, was descended from "Nimloth the fair", which itself came of the line of Telperion, one of the Two Trees of Valinor described in The Silmarillion. Those trees have powerful significance, bringing light to the world. Vaccaro states that these trees carry both Christian and pagan symbolism. In Christianity, the Book of Genesis tells of a tree of life at the centre of the Garden of Eden. Further symbolic trees described in the Book of Daniel and the Book of Isaiah, this time denoting the future King, Christ; and in the Book of Revelation, a tree of life stands in the New Jerusalem. Christ's cross, too, came in medieval times to be described as a tree, with Christ hanging on it as a fruit. In pagan literature, among many possible parallels, Yggdrasil is the world tree of Norse mythology; Vaccaro notes that a warrior comes with an axe to cut the tree, "seven the stones on which he whet[ted] it", commenting that perhaps the words of this passage "made its way into Tolkien's Númenórean folklore."

== In film ==
Peter Jackson's film version of The Lord of the Rings, set in New Zealand, introduced a new take on the botany and ecology of Middle-earth, as here where the Hobbits walk knee-deep through the invasive species wandering willie, Tradescantia fluminensis.

Peter Jackson's film trilogy of The Lord of the Rings set the action largely in the New Zealand landscape. The New Zealand ecologist Robert Vennell writes that this put native and introduced plant species into the films in "an important supporting role". He notes for instance that as Frodo and Sam set out on their quest across the Shire in The Fellowship of the Ring, they are "knee deep" in the invasive species wandering willie, Tradescantia fluminensis, a native of Latin America; it covers the ground, drowning out the native forest undergrowth. Further south, they travel through forests of southern beech, Nothofagus, used for the Elvish forest of Lothlorien, the Entish forest of Fangorn and Amon Hen where the fellowship fight the Uruk-hai. The totara tree appears in the Shire; wilding pines appear in the scene where the Ringwraiths chase Arwen and Frodo. Fictional flowers, too, were created for the films; Vennell writes that the wood anemone-like Simbelmynë of Rohan were made in the Weta Workshop.
