= Leslie Fawcus =

Personal information
- Full name: Charles Leslie Dinsdale Fawcus
- Born: 8 December 1898; Bromley, Kent
- Died: 8 December 1967 (aged 69); Worthing, Sussex
- Batting: Left-handed
- Bowling: Left-arm medium

Domestic team information
- Years: Team
- 1924: Kent
- 1925–1926: Oxford University
- 1925: Worcestershire

Career statistics
Competition	First-class
Matches	7
Runs scored	202
Batting average	15.53
100s/50s	0/1
Top score	70
Balls bowled	42
Wickets	0
Bowling average	–
5 wickets in innings	–
10 wickets in match	–
Best bowling	–
Catches/stumpings	2/–
- Source: CricInfo, 2 August 2008

Charles Leslie Dinsdale Fawcus (8 December 1898 – 8 December 1967), known as Leslie Fawcus, was an English school teacher, soldier and amateur cricketer who was Headmaster of Dunchurch-Winton Hall and played seven first-class cricket matches in the 1920s. Despite his short career, he made first-class appearances for Kent, Worcestershire and Oxford University as well as playing for Dorset in the Minor Counties Championship.

== Early life ==
Fawcus was born at Bromley in 1898, the son of a coal merchant and shipbroker. He was educated at Bradfield College from 1909 until 1917, captaining the football team in his final year, and the Fives one for two years. He opened the batting in the cricket XI in his final three years at school and his Wisden obituary notes that he "was regarded as the best batsman ever to play for Bradfield". He headed the school's batting averages for the three years he played for the team and appeared for the Public Schools team in 1916.

== Military service ==
On leaving school in 1917, Fawcus joined the Royal Military Academy, Woolwich (RMA), the training school for officers in the Royal Engineers. He played cricket for the RMA during 1917 and 1918, but left the academy without graduating in September 1918, the school register noting that he had "dipped below standard". He was commissioned as a 2nd Lieutenant in the Royal Garrison Artillery (RGA) the following day but did not see service overseas during World War I.

Fawcus remained in the RGA after the war. He was promoted to Lieutenant in 1920 and served in India during 1921 before resigning his commission in October 1922.

== Cricket career ==
After two appearances for the Kent Second XI, Fawcus made his first-class debut for the county against Middlesex in June 1924. This was his only first-class appearance for Kent, and in 1925 he went up to Oxford University where he was a student at Christ Church College. He played for the University cricket team in 1925 and 1926, making five appearances as well as playing once for Worcestershire in 1925 whilst still at Oxford.

He played no first-class cricket after the 1926 season and did not win a Blue. It may be that dropping Jack Hobbs when playing against Surrey the week before the 1926 University Match cost him his chances of playing against Cambridge and winning a Blue – Hobbs went on to score 261. He played occasionally for Dorset in the Minor Counties Championship between 1933 and 1938.

== Professional and private life ==
Fawcus married Kathleen Swann in 1921 at Ferozepore in India whilst serving with the Royal Garrison Artillery. After graduating he became a school teacher, teaching at Winton Hall school from 1934 before becoming Headteacher in 1937. He remained as Head when the school amalgamated with Dunchurch Hall near Rugby, becoming Dunchurch-Winton Hall. He died at Worthing in Sussex in 1967 on his 69th birthday.

== Bibliography ==
- Carlaw, Derek (2020). Kent County Cricketers, A to Z: Part Two (1919–1939) (PDF). Cardiff: ACS.
