= Charles Johns =

Charles Johns may refer to:

- Charles Alexander Johns (1811–1874), British botanist and educator
- Charles A. Johns (1857–1932), American lawyer, jurist and politician
- Charles Johns (golfer) (1887–1947), English golfer
