= Henry Letheby =

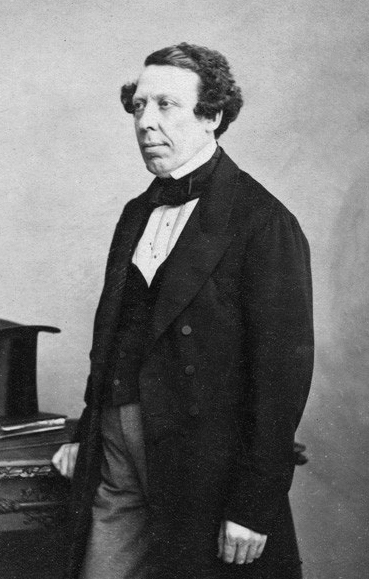
Henry Letheby

Henry Letheby (1816 – 28 March 1876) was an English analytical chemist and public health officer.

== Early life ==
Letheby was born at Plymouth, England, in 1816, and studied chemistry at the Royal Cornwall Polytechnic Society. In 1837 he commenced the study of medicine and became the assistant of Jonathan Pereira. He graduated M.B. at the University of London in 1842, and was also LSA (Licentiate of the Society of Apothecaries) (1837) and PhD.

== Career ==
He was a lecturer on chemistry at the London Hospital. For some years Letheby was also medical officer of health and analyst of foods for the City of London. He was also appointed chief examiner of gas for the metropolis under the Board of Trade. Letheby was an extremely accurate technological chemist and contributed many papers to The Lancet and other scientific periodicals. He was a fellow of the Linnean Society and the Chemical Society. Letheby's chief work was the treatise On Food, Its Varieties, Chemical Composition, Nutriitive Value, Comparative Digestibility, Physiological Functions and Uses, Preparation, Culinary Treatment, Preservation, Adulteration &c., London, 1870. His official reports on the sanitary condition of London were published from time to time.

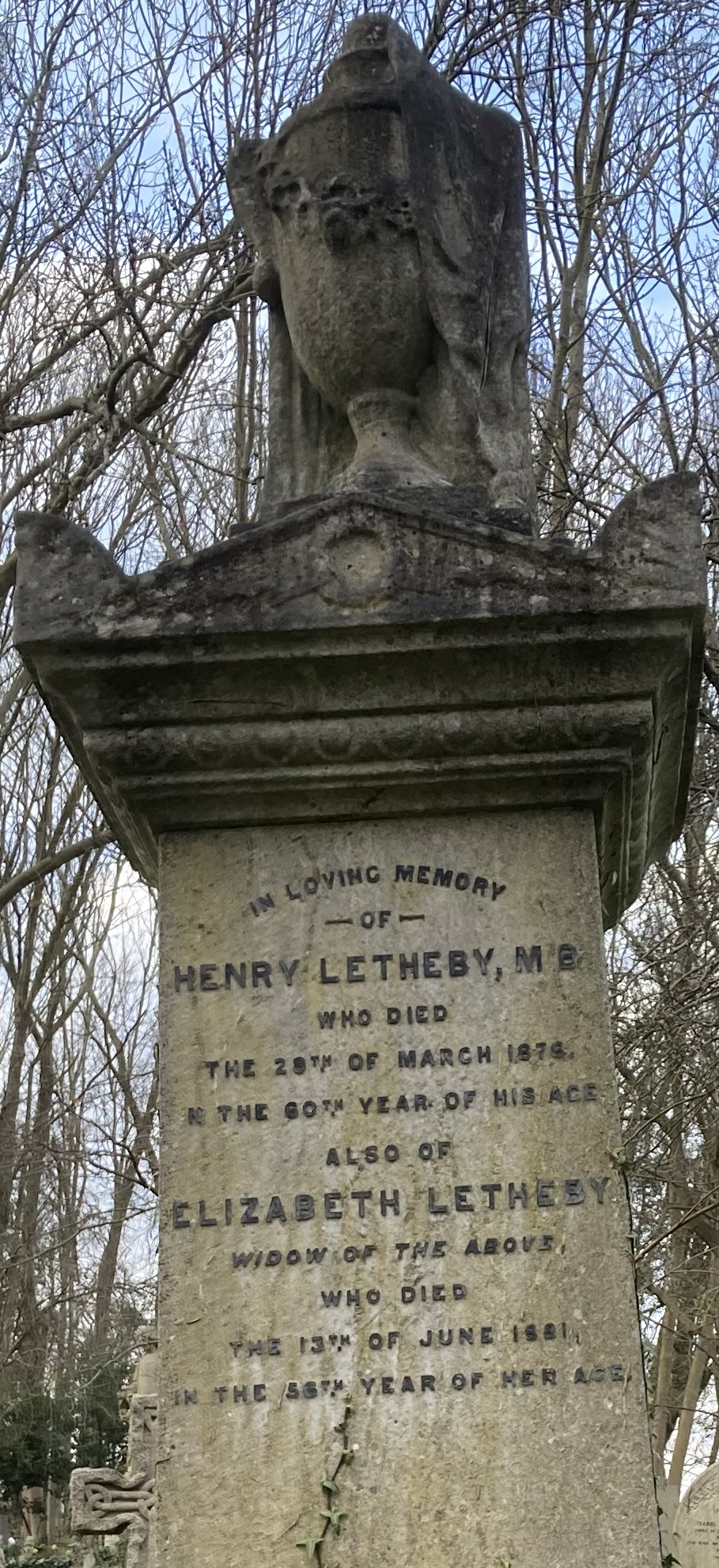
Grave of Henry Letheby in Highgate Cemetery

Letheby designed an interrupter circuit for use with induction coils for the medical application of electricity. The function of an interrupter circuit is to continually make and break the supply to the induction coil, which causes the coil to generate a large back emf at its output each time it is switched. Early interrupters were operated by hand, but Golding Bird introduced an automatic interrupter which worked electromagnetically in 1838. The problem with Bird's interrupter, and the problem that Letheby wished to solve, was that the direction of flow of the electric current was in opposite directions during the make and the break operations. Medical applications of electricity often required a unidirectional current, particularly when treating nervous disorders. Letheby's design caused only either the make or the break current to flow to the patient by a mechanical arrangement of two spoked wheels. Letherby proposed that a further advantage of his machine was that the pulses from the make contact provided a rather lesser shock to the patient than the pulses from the break contact. This gave the physician some control in situation where large shocks were not needed.

== Personal life ==
In 1848 he married Elizabeth Carter (1825-1881) of Holloway. He died on 28 March 1876 and is buried with Elizabeth on the east side of Highgate Cemetery.
