= Charles Mallam =

English cricketer and educator

Personal information
- Full name: Charles George Cave Mallam
- Born: 4 August 1859; Iffley, Oxfordshire, England
- Died: 8 December 1950 (aged 91); Brentwood, Essex, England
- Batting: Right-handed
- Bowling: Right-arm slow

Domestic team information
- Years: Team
- 1882: Oxford University

Career statistics
Competition	First-class
Matches	1
Runs scored	4
Batting average	4.00
100s/50s	–/–
Top score	2*
Balls bowled	84
Wickets	0
Bowling average	–
5 wickets in innings	–
10 wickets in match	–
Best bowling	–
Catches/stumpings	2/–
- Source: Cricinfo, 9 June 2020

Charles George Cave Mallam (4 August 1859 – 8 December 1950) was an English first-class cricketer and educator.

The son of Thomas Mallam, he was born in August 1859 at Iffley Manor House in Iffley, Oxfordshire. He was educated at Uppingham School, before matriculating at the University of Oxford in October 1878 as a non-collegiate student. While studying at Oxford, he made a single appearance in first-class cricket for Oxford University against the Gentlemen of England at Oxford in 1882. Batting twice in the match, he was dismissed for 2 runs in the Oxford first innings by Bunny Lucas, while in their second innings he was unbeaten on 2 runs. With his right-arm slow bowling, he bowled a total of 21 overs across both Gentlemen of England innings' without taking a wicket.

Mallam played his county cricket for Devon and Rutland, appearing for both in minor matches. Beside playing cricket, Mallam also played football for Uppingham Rovers F. C. from 1882 to 1886. He was by profession a teacher and was the headmaster of Dunchurch Hall Preparatory School. Mallam died at Brentwood in December 1950.
