= Binnacle =

Waist-high stand in which navigational instruments are placed

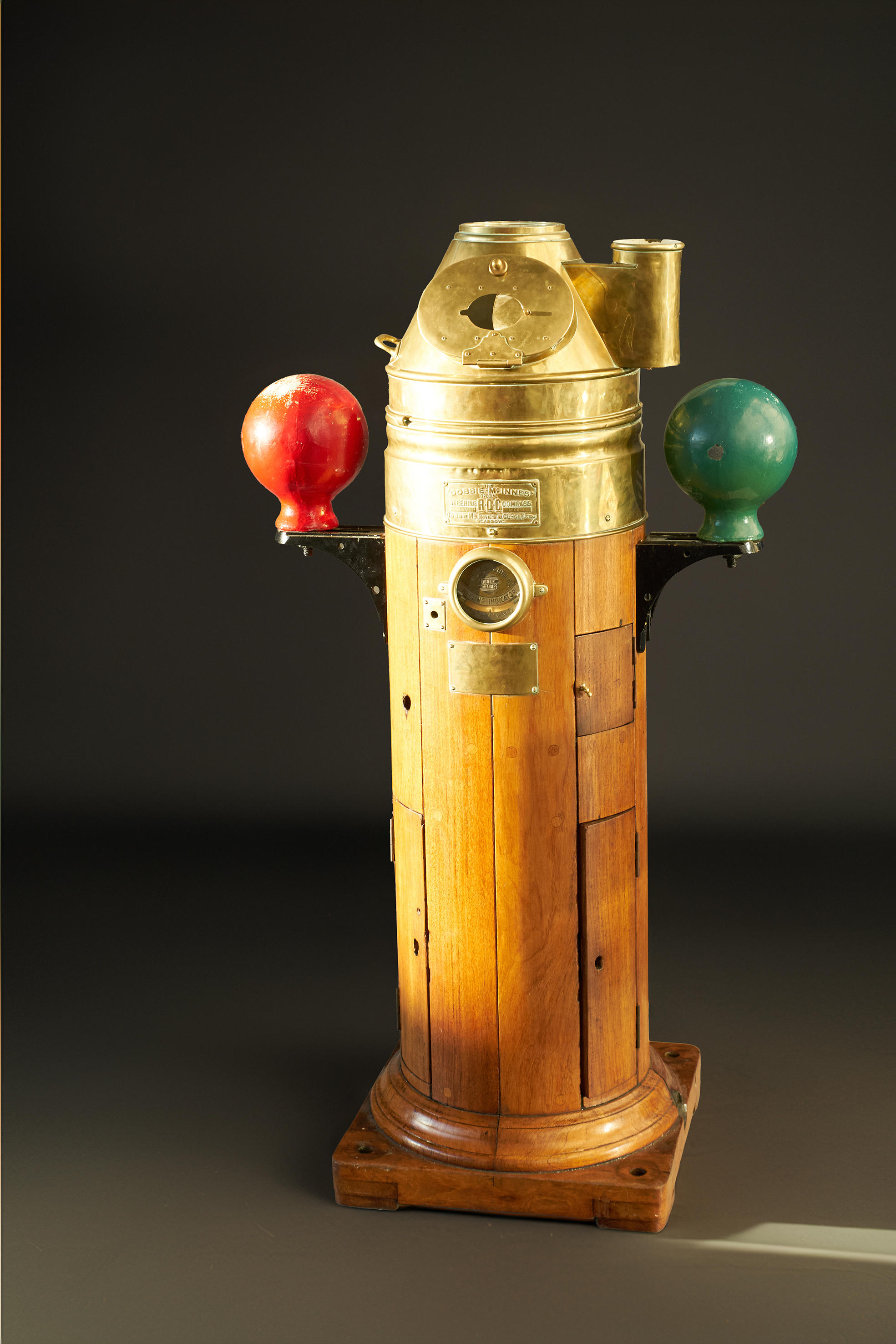
Binnacle with iron correcting spheres at each side and clinometer below compass

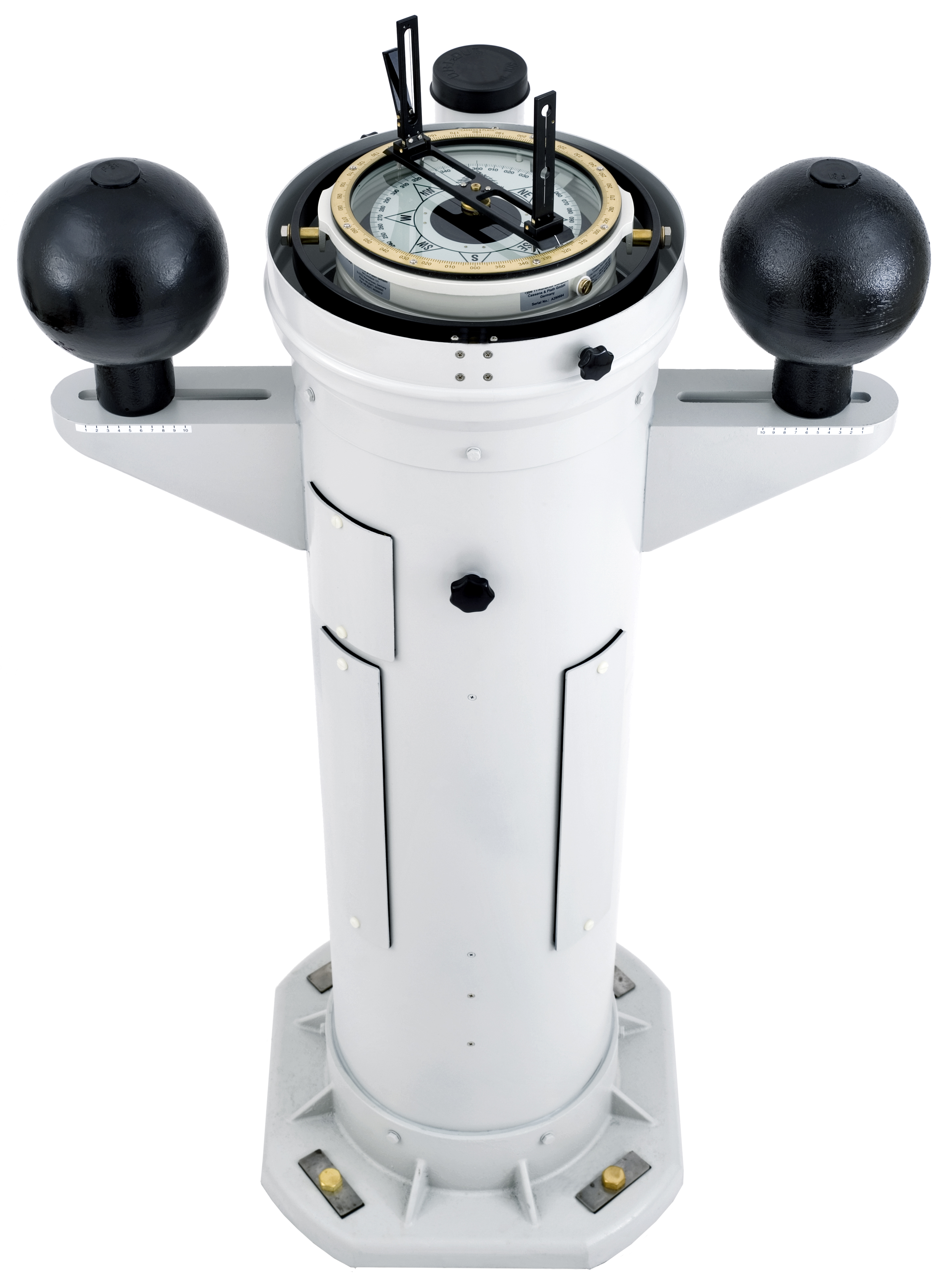
Modern binnacle with compass

A binnacle (/ˈbɪnəkəl/) is a waist-high case or stand on the deck of a ship, generally mounted in front of the helmsman, in which navigational instruments are placed for easy and quick reference as well as to protect the instruments. Its traditional purpose was to hold the ship's magnetic compass, mounted in gimbals to keep it level while the ship pitched and rolled.

A binnacle may be subdivided into sections and its contents typically include one or more compasses and an oil lamp or other light source. Other devices such as a sand timer for estimating speed may have been stored in the binnacle as well.

Binnacle can also refer to the cluster of instruments and switches mounted in a circular casing on or near the steering column of a car.

== Etymology ==
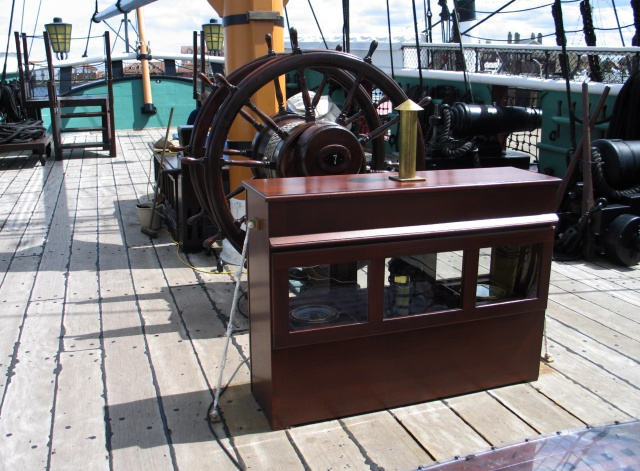
A compass binnacle in front of the ship's wheel. The small stove-pipe chimney vents the lamp used to illuminate the compass face at night.

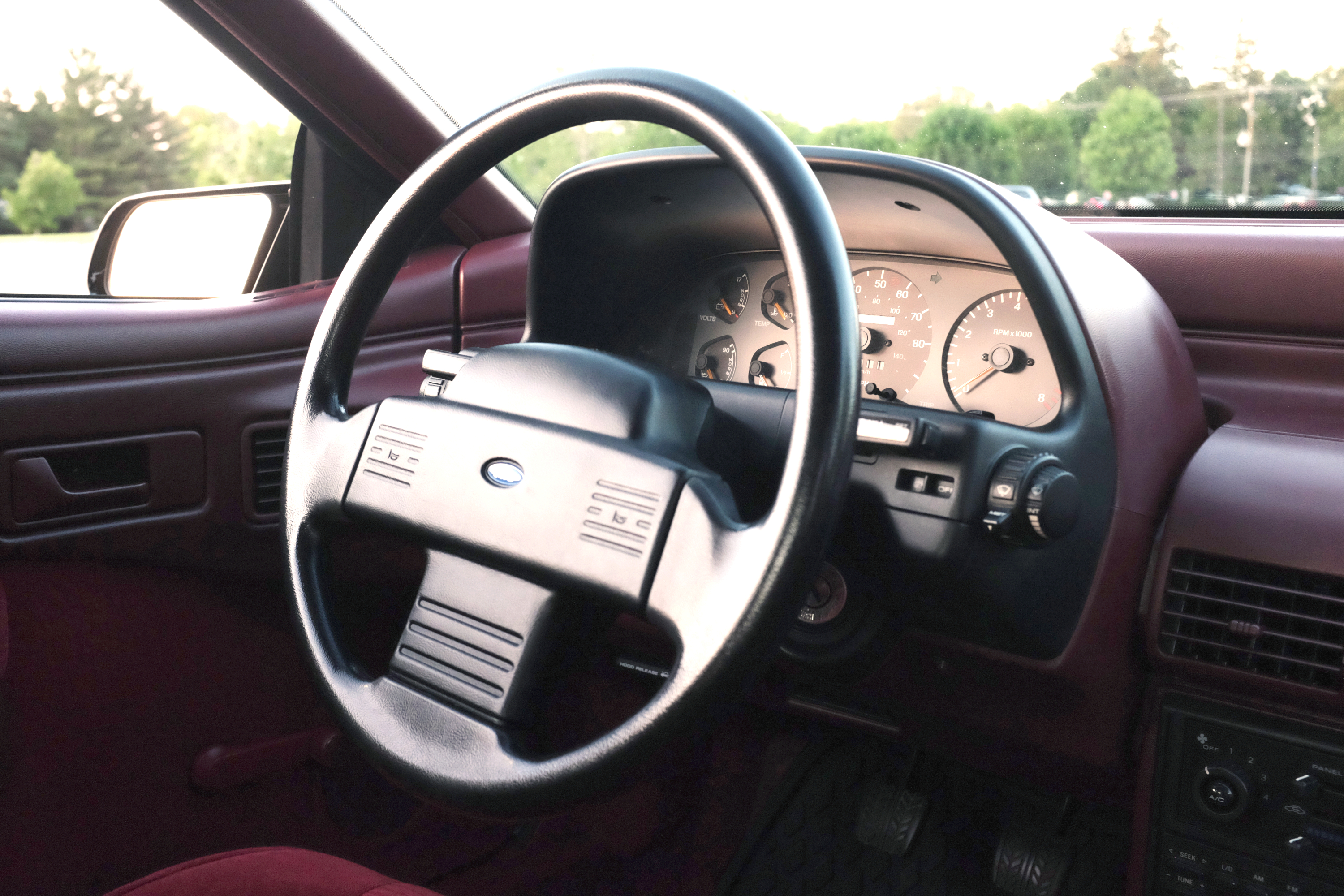
Gauge binnacle in a 1989 Ford Probe

Before 18th century bittacle, through French bitacle, from Latin habitaculum, "little dwelling".

== History ==
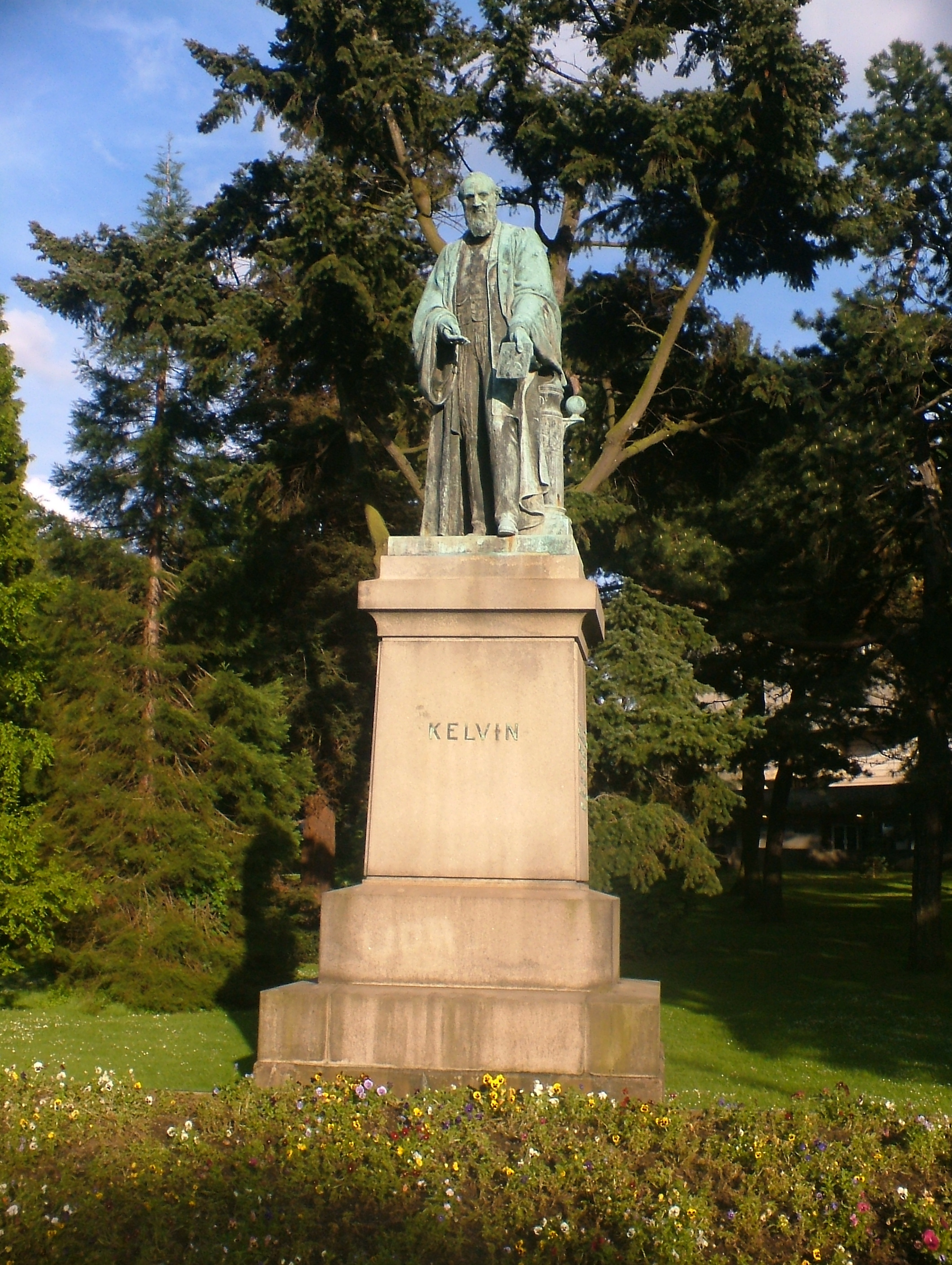
Statue of Lord Kelvin in Belfast, with a corrected binnacle behind him

The construction of many early (mid-18th century) binnacles used iron nails, which were later discovered to cause magnetic deviations in compass readings. As the development of the compass and understanding of magnetism progressed, greater attention was given to binnacle construction to avoid compass disturbances caused by iron.

With the introduction of iron-clad ships the magnetic deviation observed in compasses became more severe. Methods of compensation by arranging iron or magnetic objects near the binnacle were developed. In 1854, a new type of binnacle was patented by John Gray of Liverpool which directly incorporated adjustable correcting magnets on screws or rack and pinions. This was improved again when Lord Kelvin patented in the 1880s another system of compass and which incorporated two compensating spheres. These are colloquially known as "Kelvin's balls" in the UK, and "navigator's balls" in the United States. The National Maritime Museum at Greenwich, London, has an extensive collection of binnacles.

The ship's "binnacle list" is the medical department's report of personnel at sick bay, excused from that day's duty.

== See also ==
- Gyrocompass
- Logbook
