= Charles Alexander Johns =

English schoolmaster and botanist (1811–1874)

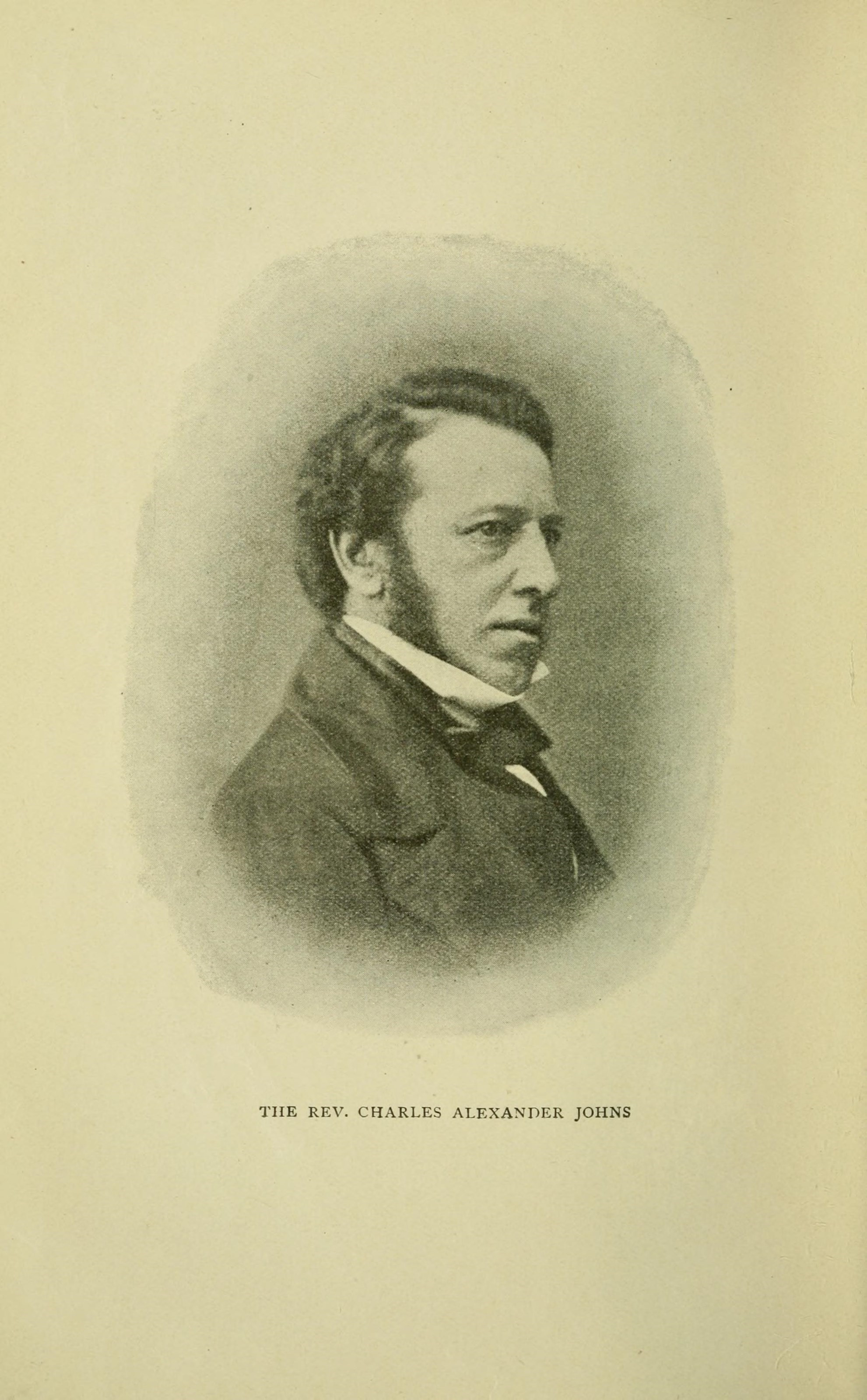
The Rev. Charles Alexander Johns

Charles Alexander Johns (1811–1874) was a 19th-century British botanist and educator who was the author of a long series of popular books on natural history.

== Early years ==
Charles Alexander Johns was born on 31 December 1811 in Plymouth, England, one of eight surviving children of Henry Incledon Johns, a banker and poet, and Maria (Boone) Johns. Two of his sisters, Emily and Julia, would prove to be exceptionally talented botanical artists. An economic crisis in 1825 forced the closure of the bank where Johns's father Henry was a working partner, throwing him out of a job and causing hardship for the family. Henry Johns then went to work as a teacher at Plymouth New Grammar School.

Johns's father had encouraged his interest in natural history from an early age, and Charles had aimed for a career in the church, following an established pattern in Britain of "parson naturalists." One of his early teachers was a local silversmith and amateur botanist, George Banks, who published a study of English botany in 1823. Johns was, however, largely self-taught as a botanist.

== Teaching ==
In 1830, Johns's father suffered a stroke that led to failing health, creating further economic uncertainty for the family and indefinitely deferring Johns's plans for going to university. Instead, he took up a post as assistant master at the Helston Grammar School. which his father had attended as a youth. He remained for four years, working under headmaster Derwent Coleridge, who was a son of the poet Samuel Taylor Coleridge. One of his pupils was the future novelist Charles Kingsley, who would later praise him as one of his country's "most acute and persevering botanists."

In 1836, Johns was finally able to combine teaching long enough with part-time studies at Trinity College, Dublin. He obtained his degree in 1839, and began to write books on his favourite subjects in natural history. This led to his first completed book, Flora Sacra (1840), a volume of inspirational poetry interspersed with illustrations of dried plants with religious significance that featured in the Holy Bible.

He was ordained a priest in 1842, after a period as a deacon in 1841 and took up a single post as a vicar under Bishop Henry Philpotts of Exeter in the village of Yarnscombe, near Bideford. He did not find the post inspiring and decided to follow his former Headmaster Coleridge back to a residential chaplaincy post in London where Derwent was now the first Principal of St Mark's Training College for the poor in Chelsea. There he was to meet his life's partner, Ellen Field, who assisted her mother, the widow Mrs Julia Field, in the creation of a sister college for young women which was established as Whitelands Teaching College for Women. The couple were to have four children in total, with three surviving to adulthood. Their joint life's work was to establish private residential schools, generally very successful, for young gentlemen, noted for a full classical syllabus and innovative teaching in preparation for the 'greater' public schools of Eton, Rugby and Winchester.

In the 1850s and 1860s, Johns established two schools: the first was Callipers Hall at Chipperfield in 1855. He established Winton House in Winchester, a private school for boys, in 1863.

== Botany and natural history books ==
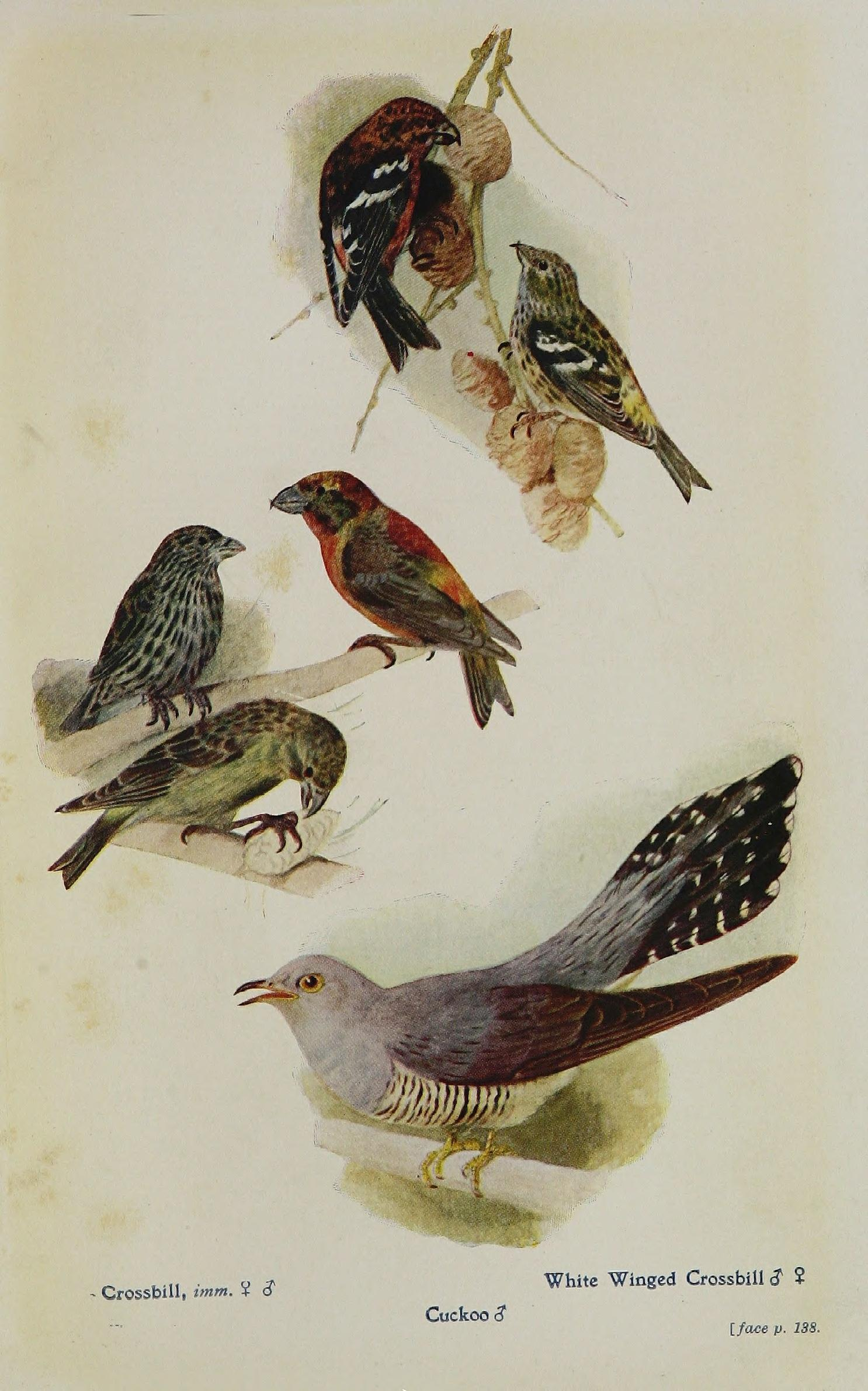
Illustration from Charles Alexander Johns's British Birds in Their Haunts (1909 edition, originally published 1862)

Johns collected plants throughout Cornwall and neighbouring counties, sending specimens to botanists like Banks and William Hooker for their herbaria. He contributed 8% of the specimens in a hortus siccus of indigenous Cornish plants being assembled by the Royal Cornwall Polytechnic Society under the direction of Elizabeth Andrew Warren. He was only 25 when he was elected a Fellow of the prestigious Linnean Society of London.

Johns is best known, however, as the author of some two dozen popular natural history books and field guides, most of which were published by the Society for Promoting Christian Knowledge. Their success was partly due to Johns's informal and entertaining style, aimed at a general educated readership, and partly due to the encouragement they offered amateurs to commune with God through nature, notably in the 'rambling' series that began in 1846 with Botanical Rambles. Some of his books, like A Week at the Lizard (1848)—an account of travels in the Lizard peninsula of Cornwall— mixed natural history with travelogue, offering advice on practical matters like transportation and lodgings.

Starting with Forest Trees of Britain (1847)—which combined scientific information about British trees with folklore—another factor in the books' success was the illustrations provided (uncredited, but signed 'E.S.') by the Cornish botanical artist Emily Stackhouse. This was especially true of A Week at the Lizard (for which nearly all of the botanical illustrations were woodcuts from Stackhouse's watercolours) and Johns's best-known book, Flowers of the Field. Published in 1851, Flowers of the Field had over 200 uncredited engravings based on watercolours by Stackhouse plus some drawings by Johns's sisters Julia and Emily. Referred to as "the bible of the amateur botanist," its success was such that it went into more than 50 editions and was still in print a century after it first came out. In this book, Johns described the plants of England and their uses, giving both common and Latin names following the Linnaean system; the overt religious themes of some of his earlier books are absent from Flowers of the Field.

A later book, British Birds in Their Haunts (1862), also benefited from expert illustrations, in this case engravings by Josiah Wood Whymper after drawings by the eminent Victorian animal artist Joseph Wolf.

Johns's flair for description is evident in this passage from A Week at the Lizard:

The launce or sand-eel is a small cylindrical fish from six to twelve inches long, which by day swims about in shoals on the sandy coast, and by night burrows in the sand, keeping near the water line. It is used by fishermen as bait for larger fish, and by others is eaten either fresh or salted. The method of catching it is quite peculiar. As it begins to grow dark the fisherman, armed with a crooked iron instrument, which, with its handle, is about a foot in length, buries its point a few inches in the sand which has just been left by a receding wave, and draws it towards him with a quick motion, holding his left hand ready to catch whatever he may scrape up. When he feels any impediment he lifts his hook with a jerk, bringing up a lively fish, which if it be not immediately secured, by a few contortions of its body penetrates the sand and disappears; or if it happen that the sand be covered by ever so shallow a coating of water, instantly turns its head towards the sea and shoots down to meet the coming wave with such rapidity as to resemble a waving line of silver. Sometimes a Newfoundland dog accompanies the party, who with his paws fishes on his own account, never failing to seize his prize and to run off with it for security to a dry part of the beach.

Johns died in 1874. There is an archive of Johns's papers at the Cornwall Record Office in Truro. In addition, the Hypatia Trust in Cornwall has some material relating to Johns and his family.

== Publications ==
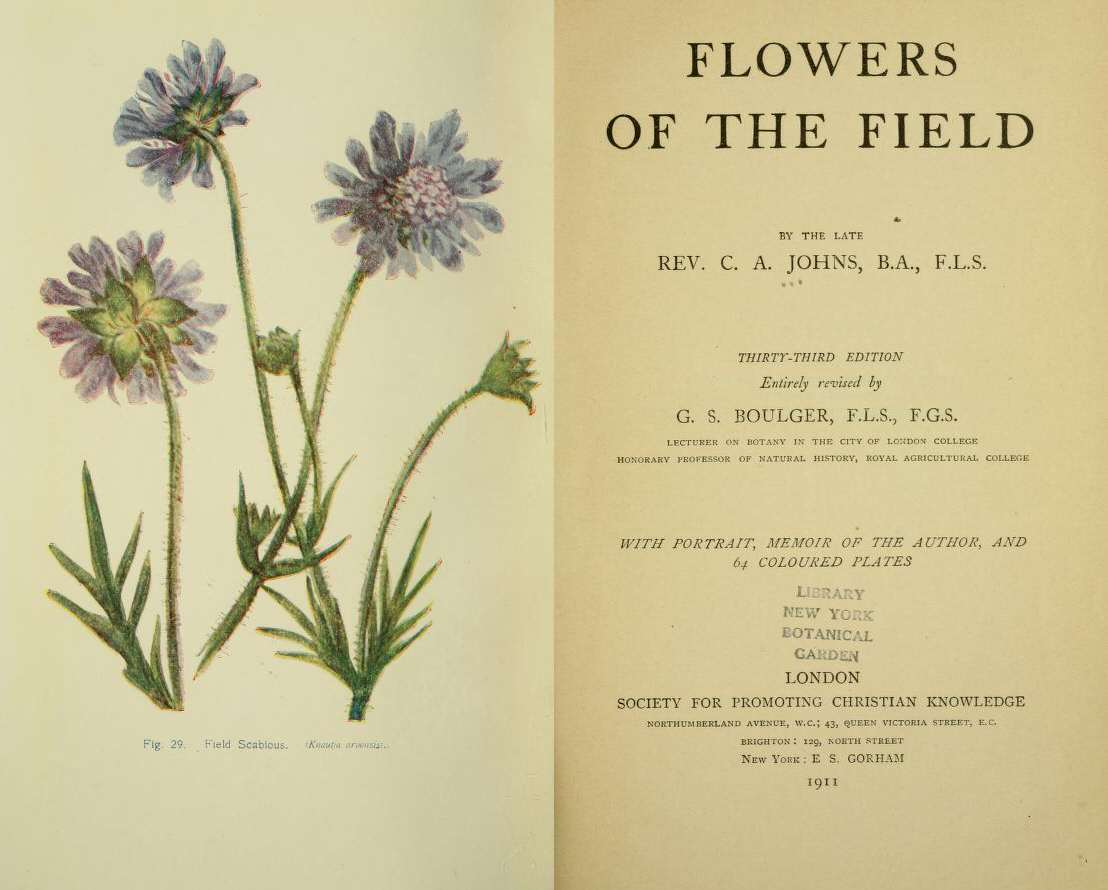
Flowers of the Field, 1911 edition. First published 1853

Publications:

- Flora Sacra, or, The Knowledge of the Works of Nature Conducive to the Knowledge of the God of Nature (1840)
- Botanical Rambles (1846)
- Forest Trees of Britain (1847)
- Rambles in the Country series (1847–52), including:
  - A Winter Ramble in the Country (1847)
  - A Ramble in Spring (1849)
  - A Ramble in Summer (1850)
  - A Ramble in Autumn (1852)
- A Week at the Lizard (1848)
- Gardening for Children(1848)
- Flowers of the Field (1853)
- Birds' Nests (1854)
- The Governess (1854)
- Rambles About Paris (1859)
- Monthly Window Flowers (1860)
- British Birds in Their Haunts (1862)
- Home Walks and Holiday Rambles (1863)
- Sea Weeds (1864?)
- The Cottage Flower Garden (1866)
- The Child's First Book of Geography (1872)
