= Dunchurch-Winton Hall =

Location
- Dunchurch, Warwickshire, CV22 6PD; England
- Coordinates: 52.335854°N 1.290593°W

Information
- Type: Preparatory School, boarding and day school
- Motto: Carpe Diem
- Religious affiliation: Church of England
- Established: 1868
- Closed: 9 July 1993
- Head Masters: Mr. Marshall and Mr Olsen
- Gender: Co-educational
- Age: 3 1/2 to 13 1/2

Dunchurch-Winton Hall was a boarding and day Preparatory School for boys and girls from 3 1/2 to 13 1/2 years. Pupils joined the Main School at 7 1/2 while from 3 1/2 to 7 1/2 they attended the Pre-Preparatory Department which was housed separately in the grounds.

Originally built as a hunting lodge for the Duke of Buccleuch in 1840, the School was an amalgamation in 1940 of Dunchurch Hall founded in 1868 and Winton House, founded in 1863 by the botanist and author Charles Alexander Johns. Dunchurch Hall had been on the site since 1883 and is now an English Courtyard development with the original Hall retained as part of the development.

The school prepared pupils for entry to Public Schools as well as for the 12+ entry examination to local state schools. The school stood in 25 acres (10 ha) of gardens and playing fields in the Warwickshire village of Dunchurch. The school's motto was “Carpe Diem”.

Dunchurch-Winton Hall closed on 9 July 1993 and was subsequently sold to English Courtyard who used land from part of the playing fields to build retirement cottages and apartments.

There are memorials to the former pupils of Dunchurch Winton Hall School who fell during the First and Second World Wars in St Peter's Church, Dunchurch.

== Headmasters ==
- Charles Mallam
