= Matthew Paul Moyle =

English meteorologist

- Born: 4 October 1788; Chacewater, Cornwall, England
- Died: 7 August 1880 (aged 91); Helston, Cornwall, England
- Education: Guy's Hospital, London
- Scientific career
- Fields: Geology, Meteorology, Surgery
- Workplaces: RGSC, RCPS

Matthew Paul Moyle (4 October 1788 – 7 August 1880) was an English meteorologist and writer on mining, the second son of John Moyle, by Julia, daughter of Jonathan Hornblower. He was born at Chacewater, Cornwall, 4 October 1788, and educated at Guy's and St. Thomas's Hospitals.

He became a member of the Royal College of Surgeons in 1809, and was afterwards in practice at Helston in Cornwall for the long period of sixty-nine years. A considerable portion of his practice consisted in attending the men accidentally injured in the tin and copper mines of his neighbourhood, and his attention was thus led to mining.

From 1841 to 1879 he kept meteorological records for the Royal Cornwall Polytechnic Society.

He died at Cross Street, Helston, on 7 August 1880, leaving a large family.

== Writings ==
In 1814, he sent to Thomas Thomson's Annals of Philosophy "Queries respecting the flow of Water in Chacewater Mine"; in the following years he communicated papers on "The Temperature of Mines", "On Granite Veins", and "On the Atmosphere of Cornish Mines".

In 1822, he read a paper on the raised temperatures in mines to the Royal Geological Society of Cornwall.

During a series of years he kept registers and made extensive and valuable observations on barometers and thermometers, and in conjunction with Robert Were Fox he wrote and communicated to Alexander Tilloch's Philosophical Magazine in 1823, "An Account of the Observations and Experiments on the Temperature of Mines which have recently been made in Cornwall and the North of England". In 1841 he sent to Sturgeon's Annals of Electricity a paper "On the Formation of Electro-type Plates independently of any engraving", which concerned the then-new process of electrotyping.
