= Henry Harpur Spry =

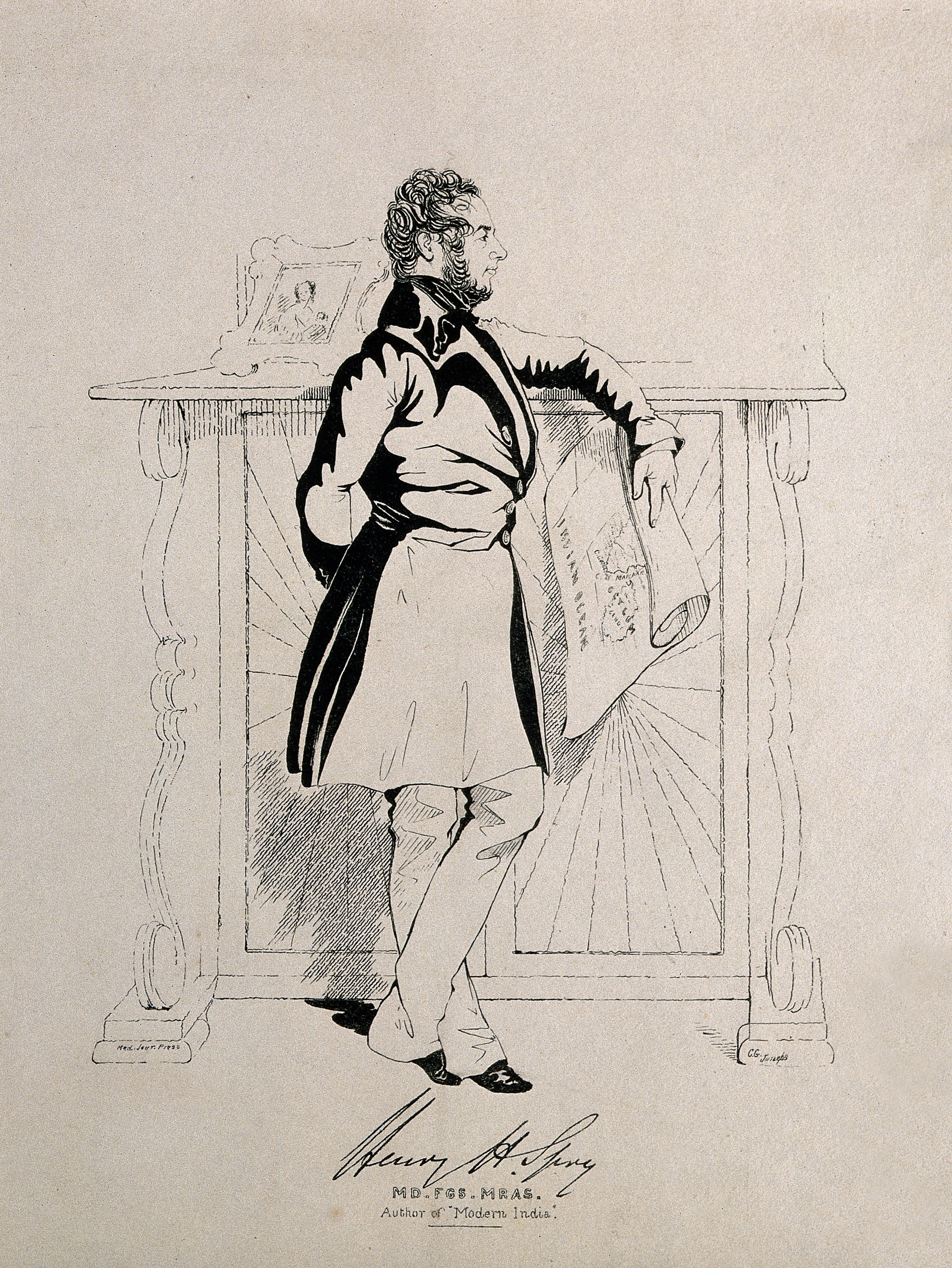
Sketch by Colesworthey Grant, 1828

Henry Harpur Spry (6 January 1804 – 4 September 1842) was an army medical officer in the English East India Company Bengal medical service. He studied natural history and fossils in India and wrote a two-volume work on the resources of India. He was also a promoter of phrenology and studied the skulls of Indian thugs who were executed as hereditary criminals.

== Life and work ==
Spry was born in Truro Vean, Cornwall, the second son of excise employee Jeffery and Philadelphia née Knight. He studied in London and became a qualified doctor in 1827. He was appointed as an assistant surgeon in 1827 to the Honorable East India Company in Calcutta. He was keenly interested in the systematic study of the land, its natural resources and economics, a field that was in vogue as the "statistical movement" and promoted by the Statistical Society of London of which he became a correspondent in 1838. He went on furlough in 1834 and wrote a two-volume work on India's (mainly Bengal) economic resources. In 1837 he received his MD from the University of Erlangen. In 1833 he sent the skulls of six executed "thugs" from Saugor to the Phrenological Society. His cousin William Henry Sleeman was later actively involved in actions against the thugs. He wrote his analysis of the thugs in the Phrenology Journal and Miscellany. He returned to India in 1833 and served as assistant garrison surgeon at Fort William. He was also active as the secretary of the Agricultural and Horticultural Society, and its journal. He also served as the statistics secretary for the Asiatic Society of Bengal. He was elected as a fellow to the Royal Society in 1841. He died in Calcutta after a fall from his carriage and was buried in Bhawanipur.

Spry noted that the thugs noted as "ritual stranglers" did not repent when sent to the gallows and willingly took the noose with shouts and cheers. His skulls were studied by Robert Cox and the analysis claimed that there was an exaggeration of the 'organs of the animal propensities' and a reduction of the 'organs of moral sentiments' (such as Benevolence) and that of 'Veneration and Love of Approbation'. He however noted that there were no visible indicators of criminality "and yet they were murderers" and considered it anomalous. The skulls were sent to the Edinburgh Phrenological Society and are now held in the University of Edinburgh. Spry also wrote on the layout of the British army cantonment in Sagar in Madhya Pradesh with a cemetery at its centre as being damaging to the psyche, "so melancholy a scene as" forcing people to reflect on mortality.

As secretary at the Agricultural and Horticultural Society in Calcutta, he was a promoter of the introduction of various plant species into India. Several plants including Chromolaena odorata, Lantana camara, Mikania micrantha and Mimosa diplotricha that have subsequently become invasive in India are traced to the period of his activity.
