= Thomas Brown Jordan =

- Born: 24 October 1807; Bristol
- Died: 31 May 1890 (aged 82); Bournemouth
- Spouse(s): Sarah, née Dunn
- Parent: Thomas Jordan
- Engineering career
- Discipline: Mining engineering, instrument making, electro-metallurgy, mechanical engineering
- Institutions: Museum of Practical Geology, Royal Cornwall Polytechnic Society, Society of Arts
- Awards: Isis Medal

Thomas Brown Jordan FRSA (24 October 1807 – 31 May 1890) was a British inventor and engineer.

== Birth and beginnings ==
Born at Bristol on 24 October 1807, he was the son of Thomas Jordan (a Quaker engineer), and began life as an artist.

== Move to Cornwall ==
When barely twenty he moved to Falmouth. While painting there and at Penzance he made the acquaintance of Robert Were Fox the Younger, in whose physical researches he took the greatest interest, as well as becoming drawing master to Fox's son, Barclay.

== Inventor ==
R.W.Fox's influence led him to relinquish painting and to set up as a mathematical instrument maker in Falmouth, where he effected improvements in the miners' dial, and had some share in the construction of Fox's improved dipping-needle. In 1838 Jordan devised an instrument for recording by photography the variations of the barometric column, and he shortly afterwards invented a declination magnetograph and a self-recording actinometer. His pioneering use of photography in meteorology was acknowledged by both Charles Wheatstone and Sir John Herschel. For some years subsequent to 1839 he held the post of secretary of the Royal Cornwall Polytechnic Society.

Sir Henry de la Beche, when engaged on the geological survey of Cornwall, made Jordan's acquaintance, and secured his appointment in 1840 as first keeper of mining records, with charge of plans, sections, and models. Jordan took a great interest in electro-metallurgy during the early years of its development, and in 1841 he made an egg-cup of electro-deposited copper, plated with silver outside and gold inside, which was considered a model of workmanship, and is now deposited in the Museum of Practical Geology, Jermyn Street, London.

== London move ==
Upon resigning his appointment as keeper of mining records in 1845, Jordan invented a highly ingenious process of carving by machinery, and set up works at Lambeth for carrying into effect the invention, for which in 1847 he received the gold Isis medal from the Society of Arts, and in the same year he was elected a Fellow of the Society. The wood-carving machinery was subsequently exhibited at the Great Exhibition of 1851, and the products were extensively used in the decoration of the House of Lords.

Later on Jordan started work as a mechanical engineer, first at Manchester, then at Glasgow, where he devised a series of machines for the production of school slates. Shortly after 1870, however, he returned to London, and established himself as a mining engineer in conjunction with his son, Mr. Thomas Rowland Jordan. Jordan's last invention, patented in 1877, was a portable machine for boring blast-holes in rock. He died in Bournemouth on 31 May 1890.

== Personal life and eventual death ==
Jordan married, in 1837, Sarah Dunn. They had eleven children. He died 1890-05-31. Mrs. Jordan survived him.
