= Elizabeth Andrew Warren =

Cornish botanist (1786–1864)

Elizabeth Andrew Warren (28 April 1786 – 5 May 1864) was a British botanist and marine algologist who spent most of her career collecting along the southern coast of Cornwall. Her goal was to create a herbarium of indigenous plants of Cornwall, and to this end she organized a network of plant collectors for the Royal Horticultural Society of Cornwall and provided numerous specimens to William Hooker at Kew Gardens for his study of British flora.

== Biography ==
Warren was born on 28 April 1786 in Truro. She lived for most of her adult life in the village of Flushing, near the port of Falmouth.

An amateur botanist at a time when British women had no access to higher education, Warren spent her time collecting and preparing plant specimens, corresponding with other botanists, and working with various scientific societies. She focused her efforts along the southern shores of Cornwall, mainly around the River Fal basin, with particular attention to marine algae (seaweeds) and cryptogams.

Warren was a founding member of the Royal Cornwall Polytechnic Society (RCPS), and she worked closely with the Royal Horticultural Society of Cornwall (RCHS). In 1833, the RCHS inaugurated annual competitions for best and rarest plant specimens, and Warren dominated these competitions from the outset. She was quickly put in charge of organizing local efforts to collect and prepare specimens for an RCHS-sponsored hortus siccus of indigenous Cornish plants, and she herself was responsible for by far the largest share of contributions—73% of some 470 specimens. In 1837, the RCHS awarded her a silver medal for her services to the society and for her efforts in promoting "indigenous botany," and in 1844 she was made an honorary member of the society.

Among the new species Warren discovered in Cornwall was Kallymenia dubyi, which was not then known in Britain. In the RCPS Annual Report for 1842, she published her discoveries of Cornish cryptogamic plants, and in 1849, she published her discoveries of marine algae along the shore near Falmouth.

In 1834 she wrote to William Hooker, inaugurating a correspondence that lasted a quarter of a century. She referred to herself once as his "pupil, unluckily placed," suggesting that she would have liked the opportunity to study with him more closely. Over the years, she provided him with specimens collected in Cornwall as well as those from abroad that came into Britain through Falmouth. She is credited (as "Miss Warren") as one of 19 plant specimen collectors to whom Hooker is particularly indebted in the preface to his 1841 Manual of the British Algae. In his history of British seaweeds, Phycologia Britannica, Hooker lists an algae named after her by the botanist Robert Caspary, Schizosiphon Warreniae (now Rivularia biasolettiana).

In 1843 Warren published a large botanical chart for use in schools to educate children about botany. Entitled A Botanical Chart for the Use of Schools, it was dedicated to Hooker. Although well reviewed, it was not particularly successful or widely used.

Warren also corresponded with other botanists such as John Ralfs, with whom she shared an interest in cryptogams. Her work is cited by Frederick Hamilton Davey in his 1909 book Flora of Cornwall, the standard reference on the subject.

Warren continued her plant-collecting expeditions into her sixties. She died at her sister's house in Kea on 5 May 1864. Memorials to her were published in the RCPS's annual report for 1864 (authored by fellow botanist Isabella Gifford) and in an 1865 issue of the Journal for the Royal Institution of Cornwall (authored by botanical illustrator Emily Stackhouse).

Her collections are held at the Royal Institution of Cornwall.
