= William Westcott Rundell =

William Westcott Rundell, sometimes W W Rundell (21 March 1816–10 March 1897) was an inventor and engineer from Stoke Damerel in Devon. He is best known for his work on the magnetism, particularly of adjustment needed for compasses on iron ships. He also campaigned for the better training of ships crews.

== Life and work ==
The son of a shipwright, he was born at Stoke Damerel. In 1845 he was appointed secretary of The Royal Cornwall Polytechnic Society. He resigned in 1855 to take the position of secretary at the Liverpool Compass Committee. Concurrently he was the Secretary of underwriters Registry for Iron vessels, Liverpool.

In 1855 and 1886, Rundell presented two reports to the Board of Trade and the Houses of Parliament giving his observations on the deviation of the compass in vessels having the compasses corrected by magnets.

At the 1851 Great Exhibition, Rundell exhibited a carbonized cast-iron magnet. He proposed a way of marking ships to mark percentages of every ships volume as a guide to determine her freeboard. He conducted experiments on the SS Great Eastern with Frederick J Evans RN. The work with Evans related to dealing with the disturbing elements arising from the iron and the magnetisation of the ships. Evans published his work in conjunction with Archibald Smith.

In 1889, Rundell created charts showing the horizontal variation in the magnetic force acting on a ship's compass needle by the iron within the ship (Dygograms) for HMS Polyphemus, HMS Curlew and HMS Dreadnought are held at National Maritime Museum, Greenwich.

He published many articles in The Engineer between 1857 and 1883.

== Papers published ==
- On the deviation of falling bodies to the south of the perpendicular. RCP (Royal Cornwall Polytechnic Society) Soc. 1847 pp 28–34
- General Index to the first sixteen annual reports of the RPC Soc. 1848
- On case hardening and tempering cast-iron magnets 1850
- On Foucault's experiment for showing the rotation of the earth on its axis. 1851
- Notice of certain peculiar circumstances in Gwinear Consols and Wheal Seton Mines. 1847. Trans RGSC (Royal Geological Society of Cornwall)
