= Royal Cornwall Polytechnic Society =

Educational and scientific centre in Falmouth, England

Coordinates: 50.1537°N 5.0682°W

The Royal Cornwall Polytechnic Society (commonly known as The Poly) is an educational, cultural and scientific charity, as well as a local arts and cinema venue, based in Falmouth, Cornwall, England, United Kingdom. The Society exists to promote innovation in the arts and sciences.

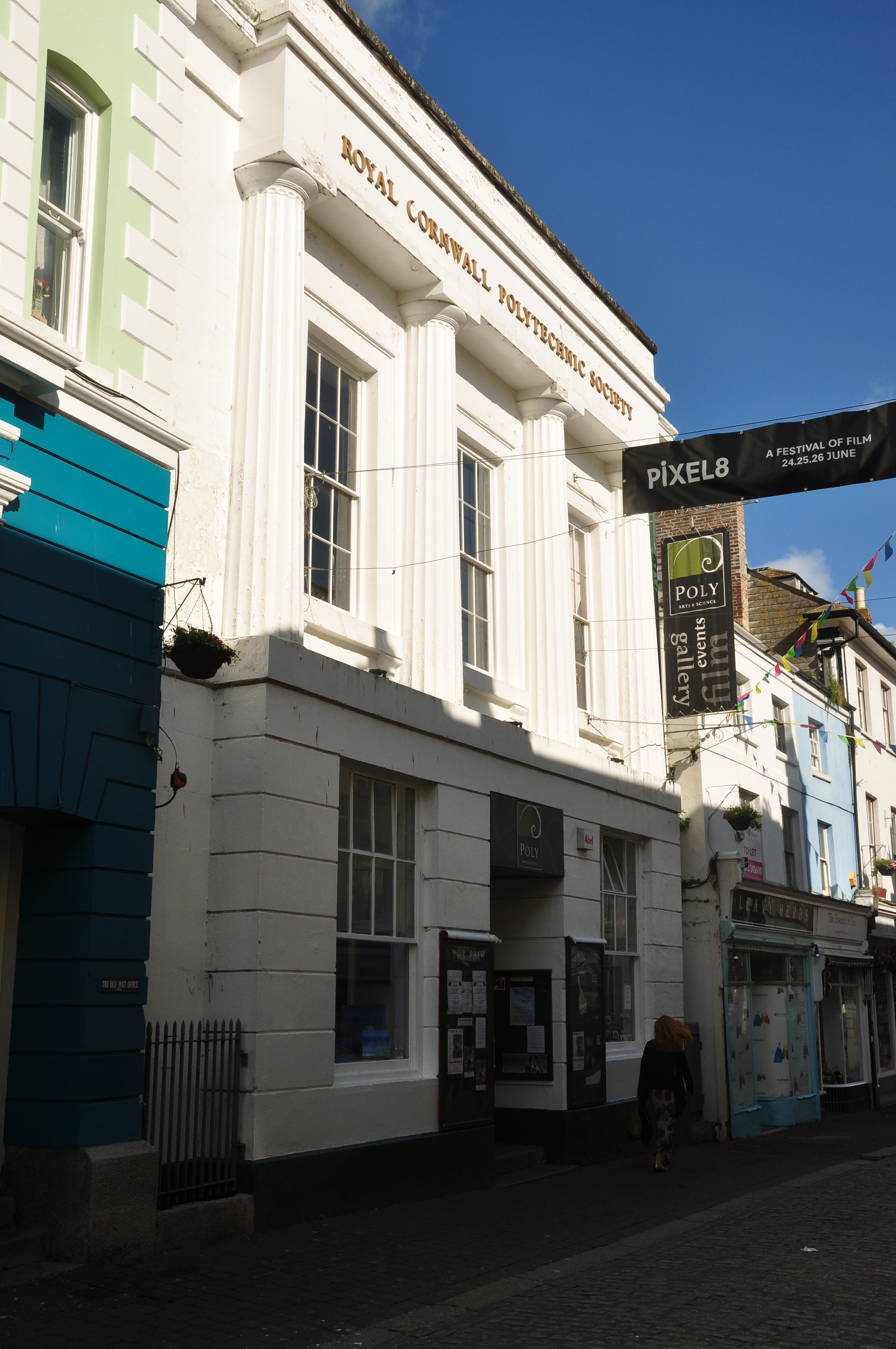
An Image of Royal Cornwall Polytechnic Society

== History ==
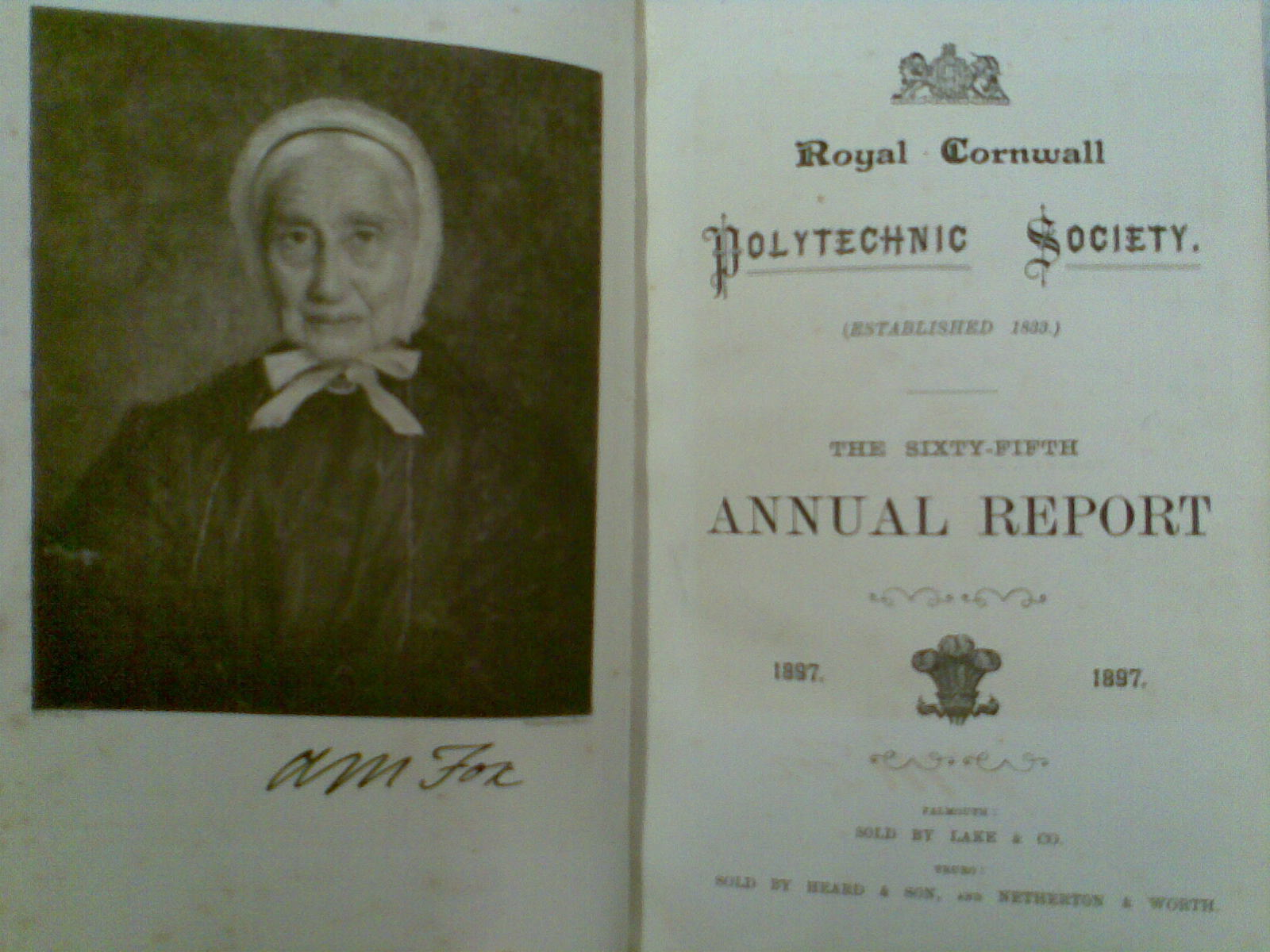
1897 Annual Report with portrait of Anna Maria Fox

In 1832 the Fox family. a prominent Quaker business family of Falmouth, founded the Cornwall Polytechnic Society, to promote the ideas and inventions of the workers in their Perran Foundry. This was the first use of the word ‘Polytechnic’ (meaning "of many arts and techniques") in Britain.

In 1835 King William IV bestowed Royal Patronage on the Society, at the request of Davies Gilbert and it changed its name from the Cornwall Polytechnic Society to the Royal Cornwall Polytechnic Society.

In the same year the Polytechnic Hall was built, at 24 Church Street, Falmouth, being originally used for “objects connected with the sciences, arts and literature”, but not for theatrical purposes. This restriction was removed in 1889 to permit “dramatic plays”. The building was designed by George Wightwick.

View of the RCPS building designed by George Wightwick

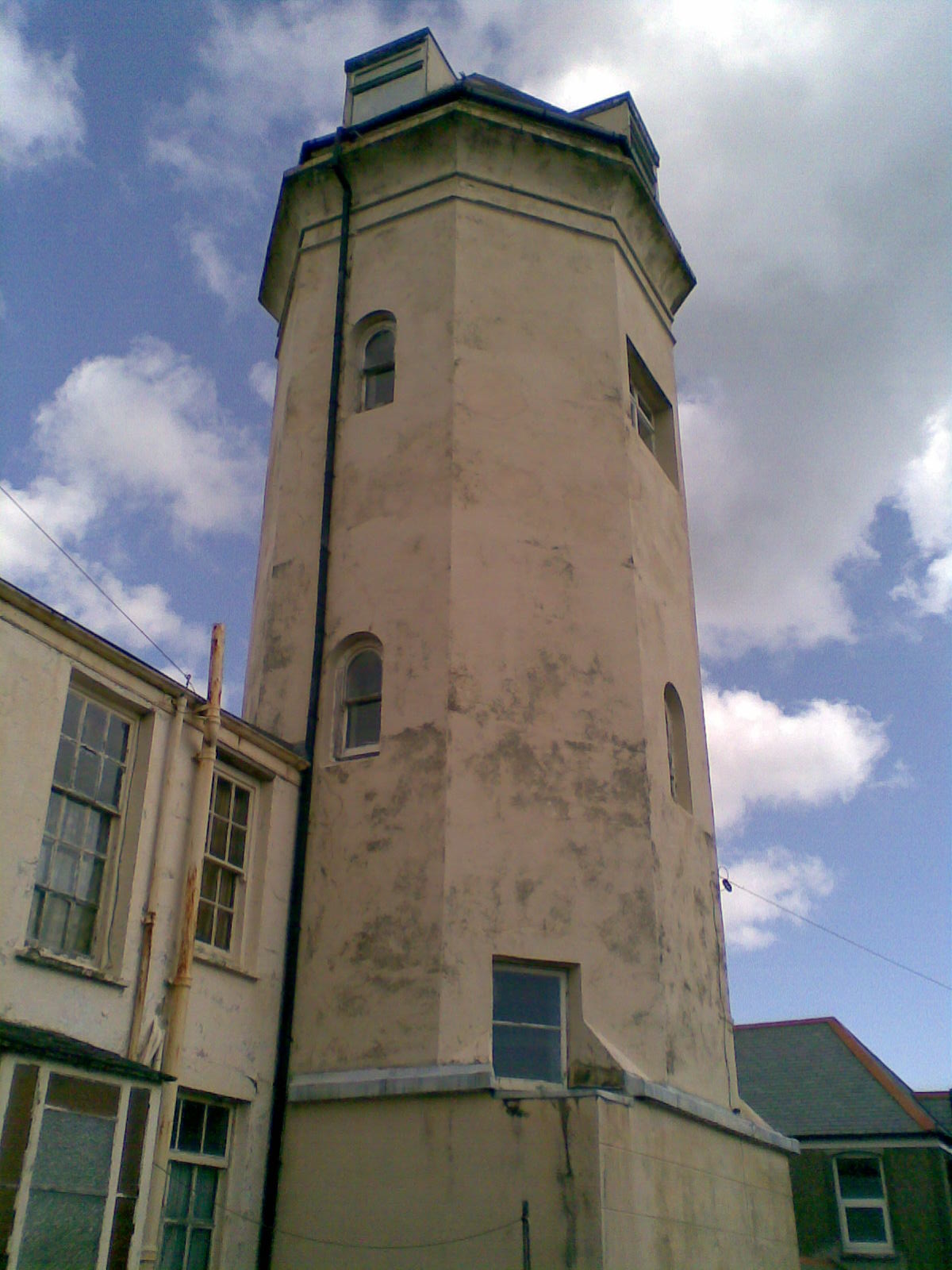
Meteorological Observation Tower, built by the "Poly" in 1868.

By 1837, the Society had local Committees in Falmouth & Penryn, Truro, Redruth, Camborne, St. Day & Chacewater, Helston, Penzance & Marazion, Hayle, St. Austell & Fowey, Liskeard and Bodmin, as well as a Ladies Committee. In all, there were 98 committee members.

The Society played a prominent role in industrial development in the 19th century, being instrumental in the development of the “Man engine” in mines also improved drilling machinery, mine ventilation, the health and welfare of fishermen and miners – and explosives. At the 1865 Exhibition a first Silver Medal was awarded for Nobel’s nitro-glycerine, following a demonstration at Falmouth docks in which a wrought iron anvil of about three hundredweight was blown up by a small quantity, and a larger quantity scattered from forty to fifty tons of rock. Prentice's gun cotton was also demonstrated. In 1858 the Society founded The Miners Association to better aid the mining industry.

The first Secretary to the Poly was Thomas Brown Jordan, followed by William Westcott Rundell.

In 1840, Jordan was succeeded as Secretary by Robert Hunt, who both organised the programme of Exhibitions and Lectures and gave fascinating lectures himself. The Society benefitted from the availability of "star" scientific and technical speakers in its Lecture Programmes, thanks to the network of friends of Robert Were Fox, F.R.S. and his brother Charles Fox. The presentation of the cutting edge of scientific knowledge resulted in large and enthusiastic audiences.

The Society has had many notable presidents including the novelist Howard Spring who lived in Falmouth from 1947 to 1965 and served for eight years.

=== Notable people ===
Notable members and others associated with the Poly include:

- Jonathan Couch (1789–1870), physician and naturalist
- Thomas Brown Jordan (1807–1890), engineer
- Charles Lemon (1784–1868), FRS, MP, Chair of the Poly
- Henry Letheby (1816–1876), analytical chemist and public health engineer
- Matthew Paul Moyle (1788–1880), surgeon and geologist
- John Eastman Palmer, 19th-century photographer
- John Arthur Phillips (1822–1887), mining engineer and metallurgist
- William Westcott Rundell (1816–1897) Secretary of the Society from 1845–55
- Walter Hawken Tregellas (1831–1894), writer
- Elizabeth Andrew Warren (1786–1864), botanist

== 21st-century developments ==
There is no serious overview of developments in the Poly from its 19th-century heyday. Peter Gilson, the Society's historian until his death in 2009, prepared a basic chronology (Note 11), which is listed below. An initial judgement would be that the Society lost its scientific impetus sometime in latter decades of the 19th century, presumably reflecting the relative decline of Cornwall's economy which, in turn, was driven by relentless decline of the mining industry from the 1850s. The Society was left with a substantial building, which could be used for films and, from the mid-Century, theatrical productions. Members kept up programmes of exhibitions and lectures, but there were regular financial problems caused by the need to maintain an ageing building. During the 1950s, the author Howard Spring seems to have injected a new burst of life into the Society, and the development of Falmouth Art School (now, Falmouth University) meant that it was able to serve a thriving local artistic community. There were, however, growing tensions between the Artistic and more scholarly sides of the Society, which came to one particularly critical phase in 2006–10 when an ambitious attempt to develop a major commercially-driven artistic programme failed and brought the Society close to bankruptcy. A Community-led campaign to "Save Our Poly" produced a revitalisation of the Society, which now (2012) supports a varied programme of Films, Plays, Comedy, Talks, Artistic exhibitions and Local History. The Society is also the owner of the biggest collection of pictures of Henry Scott Tuke (over 200 paintings and drawings). In 2012, the Society is benefitting from the relative health of the local Falmouth economy, and from the emergence of the nearby Tremough campus of the Combined Universities of Cornwall. This means that the Poly's facilities in the heart of Falmouth are increasingly a major asset to both Town and Gown.

As far as one can tell, the Poly was not only the first Polytechnic in the English-speaking world, but has now become the last one (at least in the UK).

- 1902 – Exhibition theme was "Electricity"
- 1907 – Biennial "Meeting" to the held in the summer
- 1909 – 71st Exhibition held in Camborne – the first time out of Falmouth
- 1910 – Exhibition at Truro, with them of "Agriculture and Horticulture". The Hall was renovated, with renewed gallery seating and improved exits.
- 1911 – Licence granted for "Cinematograph Shows", and the Hall was hired to Harris Brothers for this purpose – an arrangement which continued until 1931
- 1914–18 – The Society's normal programme was disrupted as the building was used by HM Forces at various times as a canteen, dance- and concert-hall and hospital
- 1915–18 – Tin and Tungsten Research Board formed as a result of war requirements. Summer meetings continued.
- 1920 – 74th Exhibition at Camborne. Sir Edward Nicholl Prizes inaugurated.
- 1922 – Art schools participate in Exhibition. "Scenes of old Falmouth" presented by the Women's Institute at Rosehill.
- 1925 – Exhibition of Essays, Models, Art and Craftwork/Photography by children.
- 1928 – W.Tregoning Hooper took over Observatory work.
- 1930 – Exhibition at Penzance: Mining and British Ropes entries.
- 1931 – Gallery completely renovated when Museum transferred from Municipal Buildings.
- 1933 – Centenary Meeting lasted 6days with an Exhibition, Lectures and Visits.
- 1934-8 – Regular programmes of winter lectures, summer meetings and Exhibitions
- 1939 – Lectures discontinued on the outbreak of war
- 1940–41 – Activities severely curtailed as a result of air raids
- 1942 – Hall used as a canteen and dance hall for HM Forces
- 1943 – Society purchased 16 & 17 Porhan Street
- 1944 – Threat of requisition og building by the Navy
- 1945 – Problems over letting the Hall. Renovation badly needed
- 1946 – Partial renovation: Model Exhibition and Winter lectures
- 1947 – Howard Spring joined the Society
- 1949 – The building was in a dangerous condition
- 1951 – Renovation of the building completed, but Society in grave financial position
- 1952 – Schools' Art Exhibition: benefit performance of Howard Spring's "Gentle Assassin"
- 1953 – Howard Spring elected president. Observatory closed and sold. Museum dispersed.
- 1954 – Falmouth Arts Centre created. Polytechnic Arts Committee formed.
- 1955 – Stage and Gallery lighting improved
- 1958 – South West Arts Conference held. Building slightly damaged by fire
- 1961 – Gallery "filled in". Arts Theatre created.
- 1964 – Performance of "Morvoren", an opera by Philip Cannon and Maisie Radford
- 1965 – Porhan Street demolished in road widening. Rear Entrance improved.
- 1966–67 – Total reconstruction of theatre with tiered seating ... cost, £6,000
- 1968 – Workshop/Studio built in New Street
- 1969 – Tuke Collection presented to the Society by Mr Brain Price.
- 1976 – Theatre Workshop formed
- 1979 – Toynbee Bequest received
- 1980 – "Falmouth Arts Project" defeated at AGM
- 1981 – South West Arts grant lost
- 1982 – Library redecorated and reorganised
- 1983 – 150th anniversary celebrated with plaque in entrance hall. Foundation lectures delivered.
- 1985 – "Falmouth Research Project" set up: Exhibition "Falmouth 1835 – 1865"
- 1987 – "Poly Craft Group" formed
- 1994 – Paul Smales lectures started
- 1999 – Visit of Princess Anne to maritime exhibition
- 2000 – the Society merged with Falmouth Arts, being renamed the Falmouth Arts Centre. New projection room and film/sound equipment: Legacies from Mavis Saunders and Jet Steele. Steele Gallery named
- 2003 – Sale of Boulton/Watts papers for £500,000
- 2004 – New seating in theatre and new logo: Purchase of Barnicoat building
- 2005 – New Constitution/Memorandum of Association
- 2006 – Members agreed to create a trading wing
- 2008 – Tuke Collection restored – £100,000 raised from grants and gifts. Chasing Clouds Exhibition top celebrate the 175th anniversary.
- 2010 – In January 2010, the trading company which ran the Poly cinema programme went into administration. A "Save our Poly" campaign led to the creation of a totally new Board.
- 2011 – The Board decided to adopt "The Poly" as its working name, keeping "Royal Cornwall Polytechnic Society" purely for legal needs.
- 2012 – Sale of Maritime Collection completed
- 2015 – New Digital cinema system installed to enable the showing of recent film releases

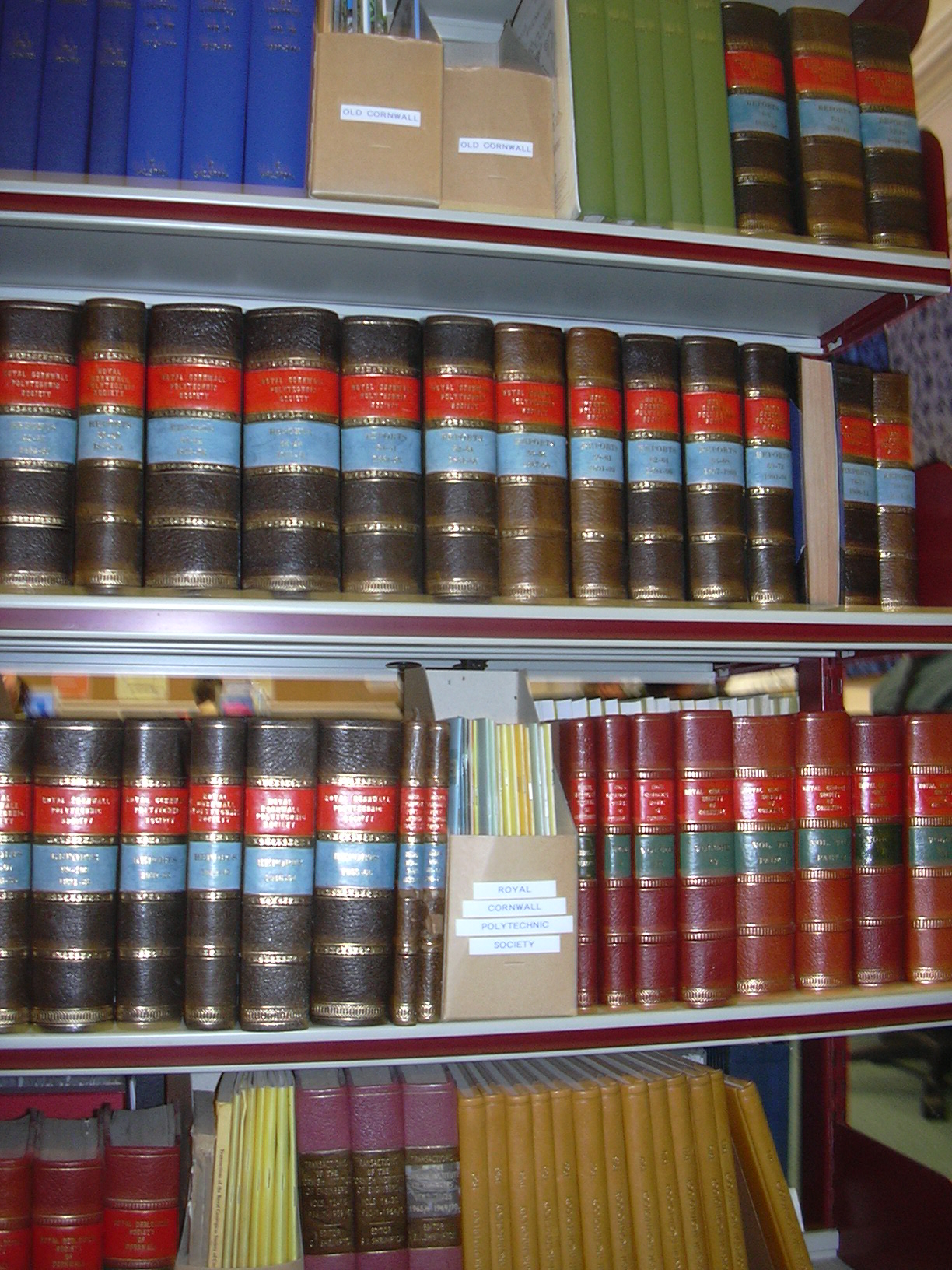
Annual Reports of the Royal Cornwall Polytechnic Society (1833–1985) at Falmouth Public Library.

== Notes and references ==
=== Bibliography ===
- The Journals of Caroline Fox, 1835–1871: a selection, ed. Wendy Monk; London, Paul Elek, (1972) ISBN 0-236-15447-8
- Barclay Fox's journal; edited by Raymond L. Brett; London : Bell and Hyman, 1979 ISBN 0-7135-1865-0 and Totowa, N.J. : Rowman & Littlefield ISBN 0-8476-6187-3
- Historical Synopsis of the Royal Cornwall Polytechnic Society ... presented ... to the Society on its year of Jubilee, 1882. (List of essays, treatises and scientific papers published in the Reports.) by Wilson Lloyd Fox; 76 pages. 1882. In : Falmouth.-Royal Cornwall Polytechnic Society, Report, etc. (Fiftieth and Jubilee Report, 1882.) [1833, etc.] 8º. British Library System number 001282900
- J.A. Buckley The Cornish Mining Industry: a brief history; Redruth, Tor Mark, 2nd Edn. 2002 ISBN 0-85025-397-7 For “Man Engine” see pages 26 to 29.
- Peter Gilson "Chronology of the Royal Cornwall Polytechnic Society Founded 1833" – unpublished manuscript, written in 1987 (?) held by The Poly's Local History Group.

== Oxford Dictionary of National Biography entries, relating to the Poly ==
- Rosamund Reid, ‘Wightwick, George (1802–1872)’, Oxford Dictionary of National Biography, Oxford University Press, 2004 accessed 19 June 2006
- Alan Pearson, 'Hunt, Robert (1807–1887)’, Oxford Dictionary of National Biography, Oxford University Press, 2004 accessed 21 June 2006
- David Philip Miller, 'Gilbert [Giddy], Davies (1767–1839)’, Oxford Dictionary of National Biography, Oxford University Press, 2004 accessed 21 June 2006
- G. C. Boase, 'Fox, Charles (1797–1878)’, rev. Justin Brooke, Oxford Dictionary of National Biography, Oxford University Press, 2004 accessed 13 June 2006
- Denise Crook, 'Fox, Robert Were (1789–1877)’, Oxford Dictionary of National Biography, Oxford University Press, 2004 accessed 13 June 2006
