= List of people from Cornwall =

This is a list of people from Cornwall, a ceremonial county of England. Those included are either native Cornish people or others who have been long-term residents. The demonym of Cornwall is Cornish. This list is arranged alphabetically by surname if available.

There is also a list of women in Cornwall and the Isles of Scilly dedicated to the notable women of Cornwall and the Isles of Scilly.

== A ==
- John Couch Adams (1819–1892), co-discoverer of the planet Neptune
- Michael Adams (born 1971), chess grandmaster
- Dr. Donald Adamson (born 1939), historian and Fellow of the Royal Society of Literature
- Ralph Allen, entrepreneur and philanthropist
- Jack Andrew, rugby player, Cornish Pirates prop forward
- Paul Andrew (born 1989), rugby player, brother of Jack Andrew, Cornish Pirates prop forward
- Michael An Gof (Michael Joseph) (died 1497), leader of the Cornish rebellion of 1497
- John Arnold (1736–1799), watchmaker and pioneer of the marine chronometer
- Humphrey Arundell (c. 1513–1550), leader of the Cornish Rebellion of 1549
- Thomas Arundell of Wardour Castle (c. 1502–1552), administrator and alleged conspirator, executed 1552
- Candy Atherton (1955–2017), MP for Falmouth and Camborne

== B ==
- Steve Baker (born 1971), Conservative politician, Minister of State for Northern Ireland, born in St Austell
- Morwenna Banks (born 1961), comedian and actress
- Jonah Barrington (born 1941), squash player
- the Basset family, landowners and tin mining entrepreneurs who owned Tehidy Country Park
- Tom Bawcock, legendary fisherman from Mousehole
- Robert Beheathland, born before 1587 in St Endellion, Cornwall, was an English gentleman who arrived in Jamestown, Virginia, USA in 1607.
- John Betjeman (1906–1984), British Poet Laureate
- William Bickford (1774–1834), inventor of the safety fuse
- Lamorna Birch (1869–1955), artist and member of the Newlyn School
- William Bligh (1754–1817), captain of the ship Bounty
- Max Bodilly (born 1994), rugby player, London Welsh full-back/centre
- Thomas Bedford Bolitho (1835–1915), banker and industrialist
- Thomasine, Lady Percival (Thomasine Bonaventure), paid to repair a bridge and founded a school
- Thomas Bond (1765–1837), topographer from Looe
- Arthur Boscawen (1862–1939), Anglican priest and horticulturist
- Admiral Edward Boscawen (1711–1761), a naval commander in the Royal Navy known as "Old Dreadnought"
- John Boson (1655–1730), Nicholas Boson (1624–1708), and Thomas Boson (1635–1719), 18th-century writers in the Cornish language
- Maria Branwell (1783–1821), mother of the Brontë sisters
- James Silk Buckingham (1786–1855), author, journalist and traveller
- Barry Bucknell (1912–2003), the original DIY TV presenter, who lived at St Mawes
- W. J. Burley (1914–2002), author of the Wycliffe series of crime novels

== C ==
- Richard Carew (1555–1620), translator and antiquary
- Elizabeth Carne (1817–1873), geologist
- James Carne (1906–1986), recipient of the Victoria Cross, Lieutenant Colonel of the 1st Gloucestershire Regiment, in the Korean War
- Joseph Carne (1782–1858), geologist, industrialist and Fellow of the Royal Society
- John Carter (1738–1803), smuggler known as the "King of Prussia", who operated from Prussia Cove
- Charles Causley (1917–2003), poet
- Ollie Chenoweth (born 1992), retired professional football goalkeeper
- Jack Clemo (1916–1994), blind poet and novelist
- William Clift (1775–1849), naturalist and Fellow of the Royal Society
- Joseph Henry Collins (1841–1916), mining engineer, mineralogist and geologist
- Myrna Combellack, academic researcher and writer of Cornish history
- Constantine of Cornwall, Cornish ruler and saint
- William Cookworthy (1705–1780), discoverer of china clay (kaolinite) in Cornwall
- Saint Corentin, missionary to Brittany
- Corineus, the legendary founder of Cornwall in Geoffrey of Monmouth's Historia Regum Britanniae
- Dr Jonathan Couch (1789–1870), naturalist and physician
- Richard Quiller Couch (1816–1863), naturalist
- Luke Cowan-Dickie (born 1993), rugby player Exeter Chiefs and England hooker
- John Kevin Curtice (born 1953), political scientist

== D ==
- Nick Darke (1948–2005), playwright
- Frederick Hamilton Davey (1868–1915), botanist
- Grenville Davey (1961–2022), artist, Turner Prize winner in 1992
- Sir Humphry Davy (1778–1829), scientist, inventor and president of the Royal Society
- Jamie Day (born 1986), footballer
- Anne Dowriche (before 1560 – after 1613), historian, poet and protestant writer
- Samuel Drew (1765–1833), Methodist theologian
- Daphne du Maurier (1907–1989), novelist
- Edwin Dunkin (1821–1898), president of the Royal Astronomical Society and the Royal Institution of Cornwall
- Herbert Dyer (1898–1974), coppersmith

== E ==
- Richard Edmonds (1801–1886), geologist and antiquary
- John Passmore Edwards (1823–1911), Chartist and philanthropist
- Joseph Antonio Emidy (1775–1835), black composer who lived in Truro
- Enys family of Enys in Cornwall, includes many landowners, MPs and public officials
- Matthew Etherington (born 1981), professional footballer who played in two FA Cup finals with two different teams, West Ham United and Stoke City

== F ==
- John Pascoe Fawkner (1792–1869), early Australian pioneer, businessman and politician of Melbourne, Australia.
- Bob Fitzsimmons (1863–1917), world champion bare-knuckle fighter
- Thomas Flamank (died 1497), leader of the Cornish Rebellion of 1497
- Mick Fleetwood (born 1947), drummer
- Samuel Foote (1720–1777), dramatist
- Stanhope Forbes (1857–1947), artist and member of the Newlyn School
- Anna Maria Fox, benefactor to Falmouth
- Robert Were Fox the Elder (1754–1818), Quaker and businessman
- Robert Were Fox (1789–1877), geologist

== G ==
- Richard Gaisford (born 1972), Good Morning Britain chief correspondent who trained at University College Falmouth
- Susan Elizabeth Gay (1845–1918), chronicler of Falmouth
- Sir Robert Geffrye, Lord Mayor of London
- Richard Gendall (1924–2017), linguist and musician
- Ken George (born 1947), scholar and Cornish nationalist
- Davies Gilbert (1767–1839), applied mathematician and technocrat, president of the Royal Society
- Helen Glover (born 1986), Olympic gold medal-winning rower
- William Golding (1911–1993), novelist
- Julia Goldsworthy (born 1978), former Liberal Democrat Member of Parliament for Falmouth and Camborne
- Gorlois, mythical Duke of Cornwall
- Pete Goss (born 1961), sailor now living in Torpoint
- Andrew Graham (born 1942), Master of Balliol College, Oxford, 2001-2011
- Winston Graham (1908–2003), novelist, author of the Poldark series
- William Gregor (1761–1817), clergyman and scientist, discoverer of titanium
- Francis Gregory (1904-?) was a champion Cornish wrestler in the 1920s and 1930s who won the heavyweight title 9 times in a row and the interceltic title 7 times in a row. He was champion of Britain in 1934. He was a famous sportsman, being a professional wrestler and boxer, who played league and union rugby (including for England). He participated in the first televised wrestling match and wrestled Billy Holland in a scene for the film "Lady of Pendower".
- Pascoe Grenfell (1761–1838), businessman and politician
- Richard Grenville (1542–1591), Navy officer
- Captain Thomas Gundry (1818–1888) was a champion Cornish wrestler in the 1830s and 1840s. His wrestling record comprised at least 25 tournament wins and five second placements from tournaments in Cornwall, Devon and London. He was 7 times Cornish champion.
- Goldsworthy Gurney (1793–1875), inventor of limelight

== H ==
- Philip Hancock of St Austell was the World Cornish Wrestling champion in 1884, winning the "open to the world" belt in Penzance. He was known as "Phep" or "Phip" and came from Mullion, Cornwall. He was 5ft 9in and won the champion belt of Devon and Cornwall, wrestling in front of the Prince of Wales. He claimed that he was never thrown or beaten in 28 years in competitions across the UK.
- James Hawes, television director, re-launched Doctor Who
- Robert Stephen Hawker (1803–1875), Anglican priest and poet, Vicar of Morwenstow
- John Hawkins (1761–1841), geologist and traveller
- Harrison Hayter (1825–1898), civil engineer
- Tim Heald (1944–2016), author and journalist
- Donald Healey (1898–1988), automotive engineer
- John Hellins (c. 1749–1827), mathematician, curate of Constantine
- Charles Napier Hemy (1841–1917), landscape and seascape artist, of Falmouth
- Barbara Hepworth (1903–1975), sculptor
- Antony Hewish (1924–2021), astronomer
- Alice Hext, gardener
- Robert Peverell Hichens (1909–1943), most highly decorated officer of the Royal Navy Volunteer Reserve
- William Robert Hicks (1808–1868), asylum superintendent
- Ian Hislop (1960-) journalist, editor of the satirical magazine Private Eye, Team Captain on TV show Have I Got News For You
- Emily Hobhouse (1860–1926), humanitarian during the Boer War
- Silas Hocking (1850–1935), author and preacher
- E. G. Retallack Hooper (1906–1998), Cornish bard, writer and journalist
- Roger Hosen (1933–2005), rugby player, born in Mabe, who played rugby for England ten times in the 1960s
- Joseph Hunkin (1887–1950), Bishop of Truro

== J ==
- Jago (born 1979), children's book illustrator
- John of Cornwall (theologian) medieval writer of the Prophecy of Merlin said to be from a lost Cornish language text
- Richard D. James (born 1971), electronica producer who works under pseudonyms including Aphex Twin and AFX
- Loveday Jenkin, Councillor for Crowan and Wendron
- Kenneth Hamilton Jenkin (1900–1980), Cornish historian, especially of Cornish tin mining
- Henry Jenner (1848–1934), scholar and leader of the revival of the Cornish language
- George Birch Jerrard (1804–1863), mathematician
- Charles Alexander Johns (1811–1874), botanist, clergyman and educator
- Thomas Brown Jordan (1807–1890), engineer
- Richard Jose (1862–1941), singer

== K ==
- Tony Kellow (1952–2011), footballer
- Kenneth Kendall (1924–2012), newsreader and broadcaster
- Henry Killigrew (c. 1528–1603), 16th century diplomat and ambassador
- Dame Laura Knight (1877–1970), artist and member of the Newlyn School
- John Knill, mayor of St Ives

== L ==
- Richard Lander (1804–1834), explorer of Africa
- Peter Lanyon (1918–1964), abstract artist
- Walter Langley (1852–1922), artist and a member of the Newlyn School
- Cassandra Latham, contemporary witch and "village wisewoman" of St. Buryan, Cornwall
- John Lawn (1840–1905), gold miner in New Zealand
- John le Carré (1931–2020), novelist
- Bernard Leach (1887–1979), potter who set up a studio pottery in St Ives in the 1920s
- Janet Leach (1918–1997), potter, wife of Bernard Leach
- Charles Lee (1870–1956), novelist
- Michael Loam (1797–1871), inventor of the man engine
- John Lobb (1829–1895), founder of John Lobb Bootmaker.
- Richard Lower (c. 1631–1691), blood transfusion pioneer
- Benjamin Luxon (born 1937), baritone singer

== M ==
- Jessica Mann (1937–2018), crime writer
- Al Marconi (born 1969), guitarist
- Mark of Cornwall, ruler of Cornwall in the legend of Tristan and Iseult (see also Tristan)
- Archibald Pellow Marshall (1899–1966), politician and judge
- William Marshall (1923–2007), potter for Bernard Leach
- Nigel Martyn (born 1966), former England footballer
- Steve Massey (born 1958), professional footballer who has played for and managed Cornish teams
- John Mayow (1641–1679), physiologist
- Rory McGrath (born 1956), comedian
- John Drew Mackenzie (1861–1918), painter and illustrator, started the Newlyn Copper industry
- Philip Melvill, benefactor to Falmouth
- Kevin Miller (born 1969), footballer who played for Crystal Palace, Birmingham City and Watford
- Chris Morris (born 1963), footballer who played for Glasgow Celtic and Sheffield Wednesday
- Matthew Paul Moyle (1788–1880), meteorologist and mining writer
- David Mudd (1933–2020), Conservative Party MP, local historian and broadcaster
- William Murdoch (1754–1839), engineer, inventor and sometime Cornish resident
- Sheryll Murray (born 1956), MP for South East Cornwall

== N ==
- Robert Morton Nance (1873–1959), scholar and archaeologist
- John Nettles (born 1943), actor
- Sarah Newton (born 1961), Member of Parliament for Falmouth and Truro
- Thandie Newton (born 1972), actress
- Obed Nicholls (1885–1962), art nouveau coppersmith
- William Nichols (fl. 1758–1780), mariner
- William Noye (1814–1872), Victorian entomologist
- Jack Nowell (born 1993), England rugby union player

== O ==
- William Oliver (1695–1764), inventor of the Bath Oliver and a founder of the Royal Mineral Water Hospital at Bath
- Alan Opie (born 1945), baritone
- John Opie (1761–1807), portrait painter, the only Cornishman to be buried in St Paul's Cathedral

== P ==
- Zoie Palmer (born 1977), actress born in Camborne
- Richard Parkyn (1772–1855) was a champion Cornish wrestler, known as The Great Parkyn. He was champion of Cornwall in 1806.
- Crawford Pasco (1818–1898) Royal Navy officer and Australian police magistrate during the 19th century, son of John Pasco
- John Pasco (1774–1853), British Admiral of Royal Navy
- Merlin Owen Pasco (1892–1918), New Zealand entomologist
- Samuel Pasco (1834–1917), United States Senator from Florida
- Francis Polkinghorne Pascoe (1813–1893), Cornish entomologist
- James Polkinghorne (1788 – 1851) was a champion Cornish wrestler who had a number of famous contests against Devon fighters, including Flower, Jackman (1816) and Abraham Cann (1826), which drew very large crowds of spectators (c17,000).
- Alex Parks (born 1984), singer/songwriter who won Fame Academy in 2003
- Philip Payton (born 1953), historian and Professor of Cornish and Australian Studies
- John Pearce was the Cornish wrestling champion of Cornwall in 1887 and held the title for 6 years. He won over 24 tournaments in England and the USA. Pearce also claimed to be world Cornish wrestling champion in 1884 and in 1894.
- Andrew Pears (1770–1845), soap manufacturer who invented Pears soap
- William Pengelly (1812–1894), geologist and archaeologist
- David Penhaligon (1944–1986), Liberal Member of Parliament
- Susan Penhaligon (born 1949), actress and writer
- Dolly Pentreath (1692–1777), fish pedlar who has been described as the last native speaker of the Cornish language
- Saint Petroc (c. 468 – c. 564), a patron saint of Cornwall
- John Arthur Phillips (1822–1887), geologist, metallurgist, mining engineer
- Rosamunde Pilcher (1924–2019), novelist
- Saint Piran (or Perran), patron saint of Cornwall and of tin miners
- Sam Pollard (1864–1915), Methodist missionary and creator of the Miao script
- William Praed (1747–1833), businessman and banker

== Q ==
- Arthur Quiller-Couch (aka 'Q') (1863–1944), author, academic and literary critic

== R ==
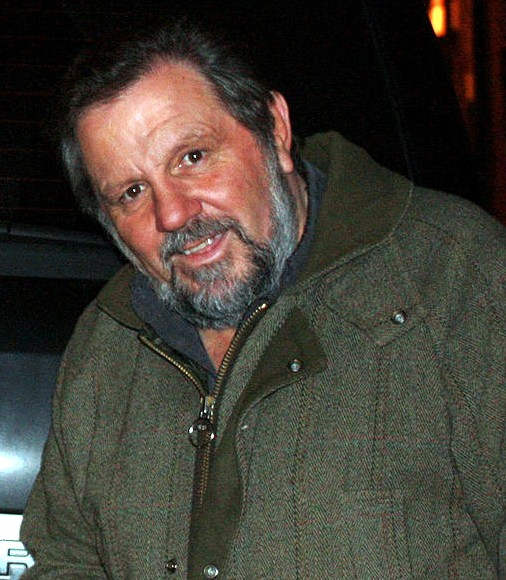
Jethro

- John Ralfs (1807–1890), botanist
- Rashleigh family merchants and landowners
- Andy Reed (born 1969), rugby union player who played for Bath RFC and won 18 caps for Scotland
- Rick Rescorla (1939–2001), hero of the Twin Towers terrorist attack of September 11th 2001
- Henry Chidley Reynolds (1849–1925), dairy farmer who started the Anchor brand of butter
- Caroline Righton (born 1958), Radio presenter and newspaper reporter
- Katie Robinson (born 2002), footballer for England
- Edward Hearle Rodd (1810–1880), ornithologist
- Geoffrey Rowe (1948–2021), Cornish comedian better known as Jethro
- Richard Rowett Cornish American, served in the American Civil War and introduced the beagle to the USA.
- Dr A. L. Rowse, (1903–1997), historian, novelist and poet
- Hilda Runciman (1869–1956), MP for St Ives

== S ==
- Helena Sanders, Cornish nationalist and humanitarian
- Sweet Saraya (born 1971), professional wrestler and promoter
- William Scawen (1600–1689), soldier and linguist
- Kristin Scott Thomas (born 1960), actress
- Hugh Scully (1943–2015), television presenter who lives in Truro
- Richard Sharp (born 1938), rugby union footballer who played in the 1960s who captained England and won 14 caps
- Matthew Shepherd (born 1976), rugby player Plymouth Albion scrum-half/full-back
- Tim Smit (born 1954), executive vice-chairman and co-founder of the Eden Project
- Barney Solomon (1883–1952), rugby union player who captained the silver medal-winning Great Britain team in the 1908 Olympics
- John Spargo (1876–1966), socialist and scholar
- Matthew Spriggs, professor of archaeology specialising in Southeast Asia and the Pacific
- Howard Spring (1889–1965), novelist
- Emily Stackhouse (1811–1870), botanical artist and plant collector
- Rick Stein (born 1947), celebrity chef, restaurateur, writer and television presenter
- Tristan Stephenson (born 1982), mixologist and drinks industry expert
- Brian "Stack" Stevens (1940–2017), born in Godolphin, rugby player who won 25 caps for England

== T ==
- Derek Tangye (1912–1996), writer who wrote the Minack Chronicles
- Nigel Tangye (1909–1988), airman, author and hotelier at Newquay
- Richard Tangye (1833–1906), engineer
- Roger Taylor (born 1949), rock drummer with the group Queen
- Nigel Terry (1945–2015), actor (King Arthur in Excalibur, 1981)
- D. M. Thomas (born 1935), novelist, poet, playwright and translator
- E. V. Thompson (1931–2012), historical novelist
- Mary Ann Tocker (1778–1853), early radical who exposed corruption in the Stannary Courts 1818
- Anthony Tonkin (born 1980), footballer who played for Yeovil Town, Cambridge United, Oxford United and Crewe
- Sam Toy (1923–2008), former chairman of the Ford Motor Company, UK
- Sheila Tracy (1934–2014), BBC Radio 2 presenter
- Mike Trebilcock (born 1944), footballer who won the FA Cup in 1966 with Everton
- David Treffry (1926–2000), colonial administrator and international financier
- Giant Tregeagle, lawyer
- Peter Tregloan (born 1957), powerlifter
- Jonathan Trelawny (1650–1721), Anglican bishop and antagonist of James II
- Petroc Trelawny (born 1971), journalist and BBC Radio 3 presenter
- Sir William Trelawny, 6th Baronet (c. 1722–1772), MP for West Looe and Governor of Jamaica
- Henry Trengrouse (1772–1854), inventor of a rocket-powered maritime rescue system
- Silvanus Trevail (1851–1903), architect, mayor of Truro and president of the Society of Architects
- Raleigh Trevelyan (1923–2014), author and publisher
- Jonathan Trevethick (1864-1939), New Zealand businessman and politician
- John Trevisa (fl. 1342–1402 CE), translator and co-author of the first Bible in English and earliest attestation of 1/3rd of words in the English language.
- Richard Trevithick (1771–1833), inventor, engineer and builder of the first steam locomotive
- Josephine Ruby Trevorrow (1935–2018), first wife and consort of Iskandar of Johor (as Crown Prince of Malaysia) and mother of Ibrahim Iskandar of Johor, current King of Malaysia and Sultan of Johor.
- Joseph Trewavas (1835–1905), able seaman who won the Victoria Cross
- Elizabeth Trewinnard (born before 1525 – died after 1587), Lady Killigrew, aristocrat who was convicted of piracy during the reign of Queen Elizabeth I
- Tristan, hero of the Tristan and Iseult legend, nephew of Mark of Cornwall
- Henry Scott Tuke (1858–1929), artist, photographer and impressionist painter

== V ==
- John Verran (1856–1932), Premier of South Australia
- Luke Vibert (born 1973), electronica producer who works under pseudonyms including Wagon Christ and Plug
- Phil Vickery (born 1976), England rugby player
- Andrew Vivian (1759–1842), Trevithick's cousin and collaborator, and captain of Dolcoath Mine

== W ==
- Selina Wadge, convicted murderer hanged at Bodmin Jail
- William Wagstaff, ornithologist and naturalist
- Alfred Wallis (1855–1942), Cornish fisherman and artist
- Samuel Wallis (1728–1795), explorer of the Pacific
- Williams family of Caerhays and Burncoose, landowners and entrepreneurs
- Patrick Woodroffe (1940–2014), fantasy artist
- Edward Woodward (1930–2009), actor who spent his last years at his home in Hawker's Cove, Cornwall and died in Truro
- Brenda Wootton (1928–1994), folk singer and poet
- Lilian Wyles (1885–1975), first female detective in the British Police Force
- Beatrice Frederika Wright (1910–2003), MP for Bodmin

== See also ==
- Category:Cornwall-related lists
- Category:Cornwall-related biographical lists
- Cornish people
- List of Cornish Christians
- List of Cornish saints
