= List of women in Cornwall and the Isles of Scilly =

This is a list of notable women, living and dead, from Cornwall and the Isles of Scilly in the United Kingdom. Notability is based on achievements that have had a verifiable impact or public output or participation in a significant event, in the fields of art, literature, business, industry, science, culture, sport, education, politics, war, philanthropy, medicine and a range of other topics.

Notable women from Cornwall are also listed in the article List of people from Cornwall.

== A ==
- Constance Agar-Robartes, First World War nurse
- Victoria Amran, founder of the Cornish Food Box Company, business woman
- Doris Ansari, Cornish politician and former leader of Cornwall County Council
- Candy Atherton, ex-MP for Falmouth and Camborne

== B ==
- Morwenna Banks, actor
- Antonia Barber, writer of fiction
- Frances Basset, 2nd Baroness Basset
- Ann "Granny" Boswell (1813 – 1909), Gypsy wise woman and healer
- Maria Branwell, mother of English writers Emily Brontë, Anne Brontë and Charlotte Brontë
- Michaela Breeze, Commonwealth champion weightlifter
- Dame Alida Brittain, harpist
- Mary Bryant, famous prisoner who escaped Australian penal colony
- Katharine Burdekin, novelist, feminist, sister of Rowena Cade

== C ==
- Rowena Cade, creator, builder and founder of the Minack Theatre
- Elizabeth Carne, scientist and banker
- Vera Carne, First World War Women's Land Army
- Helena Charles, Cornish nationalist
- Evelyn Clements, munitions worker
- Ithell Colquhoun, artist and writer
- Myrna Combellack, researcher and translator of Beunans Meriasek
- Judith Cook, journalist and campaigner
- Selina Cooper, suffragist
- Margaret Ann Courtney, folklorist and poet

== D ==
- Phyllis Doherty, folk singer, First World War commandant of Women's Volunteer Motor Corps
- Anne Dowriche, poet
- Daphne du Maurier, novelist and writer

== F ==
- Liz Fenwick, writer, novelist
- Elizabeth Forbes, artist and storyteller
- Anna Maria Fox, a promoter of the Royal Cornwall Polytechnic Society
- Caroline Fox, writer

== G ==
- Susan Elizabeth Gay, writer
- Anna Gelderd, MP for South East Cornwall
- Ann Glanville, 19th-century champion rower
- Helen Glover, rower, Olympic gold medallist 2012
- Julia Goldsworthy, politician
- Queen Gwendolin, medieval legendary figure

== H ==
- Melissa Hardie-Budden, writer, founder of the Hypatia Trust, philanthropist
- Faith Harris, sailor, secretary to Railway Purchasing Mission
- Barbara Hepworth, sculptor and artist
- Alice Hext, gardener and philanthropist
- Corona Hicks, women's rights campaigner
- Rose Hilton, artist
- Emily Hobhouse, peace activist and human rights campaigner
- Salome Hocking, novelist
- Barbara Hosking, civil servant and broadcaster

== I ==
- Iseult, figure in Arthurian legend

== J ==
- Loveday Jenkin, Cornish nationalist politician; councillor for Crowan and Wendron
- F. Tennyson Jesse, writer
- Jane Johnson, writer
- Lucy E. Jones, founder of the Cornish Food Box Company, businesswoman; Chair Cornwall Food & Farming Group

== K ==
- Ann Kelley, writer and photographer
- Marguerite Kesteloot, Belgian refugee, strawberry grower
- Jayne Kirkham, MP for Truro and Falmouth
- Laura Knight, artist

== L ==
- Mary Lang, writer, photographer, sailor, diarist
- Cassandra Latham, white witch
- Janet Leach, artist
- Katharine Lee (Kitty Lee Jenner; 1853–1936), writer
- Margaret Lidgey, bal captain, First World War mine manager
- Alice de Lisle, Lord of Alverton, founder of Penzance market
- Moura Lympany, musician, concert pianist

== M ==
- Margo Maeckelberghe, artist
- Jessica Mann, novelist and journalist
- Charlotte Mary Matheson, writer
- Margaret Mellis, St Ives school artist
- Chesten Marchant, last monoglot Cornish-speaker (died 1676)
- Anna Maria Murphy, writer, playwright, poet, storyteller
- Sherryl Murray, MP for South East Cornwall

== N ==
- Sarah Newton, MP for Truro and Falmouth
- Thandie Newton, actor

== P ==
- Gertrude Parsons, novelist
- Jean Paton, bryologist and botanist
- Cassie Patten, British Olympic swimmer
- Toni Pearce, former President of the National Union of Students in the United Kingdom
- Susan Penhaligon, actor
- Dolly Pentreath, last Cornish speaker according to tradition
- Thomasine, Lady Percival, benefactress and founder of a school
- Annie Phillips, autograph collector
- Elizabeth Philp, singer, music educator and composer
- Rosamunde Pilcher, novelist
- Litz Pisk, movement pioneer and instructor
- Beatrice Pole-Carew, First World War host for convalescent soldiers (portrait)
- Margaret Steuart Pollard (Peggy), Cornish language poet
- Agnes Prest, Protestant martyr

== Q ==
- Mabel Quiller-Couch, editor, compiler and children's writer

== R ==
- Joan Rendell, historian
- Jean Rhys, writer
- Mary Richards (prisoner of war), First World War prisoner of war in Germany
- Edith Jane Rouncefield, First World War nurse in First Aid Nursing Yeomanry and co-founder of Mevagissey Museum
- Jenny Rowe, lawyer and civil servant
- Hilda Runciman, MP for St Ives
- Mary Snell Rundle, nursing educator

== S ==
- Angie Sage, writer, novelist
- Sweet Saraya, professional wrestler
- Kristin Scott Thomas, actor
- Penelope Shuttle, poet
- Jemma Simpson, 800m runner
- Emma Smith, writer
- Hannah Stacey, free-diver
- Emily Stackhouse, scientist

== T ==
- Mary Ann Tocker, early radical who exposed corruption in the Stannary Courts, 1818
- Sheila Tracy, writer, broadcaster, musician, trombonist, singer
- Enys Tregarthen, children's writer
- Sharon Tregenza, writer, novelist
- Kate Tremayne, writer, novelist
- Josephine Ruby Trevorrow, first wife and consort of Iskandar of Johor (as Crown Prince of Malaysia) and mother of Ibrahim Iskandar of Johor, King of Malaysia and Sultan of Johor
- Stella Turk, scientist, environmentalist

== V ==
- Annabel Vernon, champion rower (2008 Olympics)
- Clara Coltman Vyvyan, née Rogers, an author and the wife of the 10th Vyvyan baronet

== W ==
- Serena Wadham, feminist activist and photographer
- Frances Wall, professor of applied mineralogy, first female Head of Camborne School of Mines, University of Exeter
- Mary Wesley, writer, novelist
- Mary Williams (nurse), First World War Voluntary Aid Detachment hospital organiser
- Venetia Williams, racehorse trainer
- Raynor Winn, long distance walker and writer
- Mary Wolverston aka Lady Killigrew, alleged pirate
- Brenda Wootton, Cornish poet and singer
- Lilian Wyles, first female police detective in Scotland Yard
