= Horace Pym =

British book collector and editor (1844–1896)

Horatio Noble Pym, known as Horace Pym (2 July 1844 – 5 May 1896) was a confidential solicitor, book collector and the editor of the best-selling private journal of the Quaker writer, Caroline Fox: Memories of Old Friends, published in 1881.

== Name, birth and parentage ==
He is more properly known as Horatio Noble Pym and sometimes as H.N. Pym, was born 2 July 1844. He was the son of Rev. William Wollaston Pym, Rector of Willian in Hertfordshire and his second wife, Edith Elizabeth Noble. He is a descendant of David Mathews, the Loyalist Mayor of New York City under the British during the American Revolutionary War - his daughter Catalina married British Lt. James Lamb Jr. and they settled at the Lamb homestead in Rye, East Sussex.

== Memories of Old Friends ==
He is famous for editing the twelve manuscript volumes of Journals of Caroline Fox, under the supervision of her sister, Anna Maria. In 1881 Smith, Elder & Co. published the selection as Memories of Old Friends; being extracts from the journals and letters of Caroline Fox of Penjerrick, Cornwall from 1835 to 1871, advertising the book in The Times for the Christmas Present market. Despite the "extreme timidity" with which he censored the text, the book was a surprise Victorian best-seller. A second edition was published the following year, with additional letters from J.S. Mill.

== Marriages and children ==
Pym married successively two of Caroline Fox's relations.

On 12 September 1876 he married firstly Sarah Juliet Backhouse, daughter of Edmund Backhouse MP and his wife Juliet, a daughter of Charles Fox, the brother of Caroline Fox's father Robert Were Fox. They had three children, Julian (1877–1898), his brother Charles (1879–1971), and Juliet, who was born and died in 1880. Her mother, Sarah Juliet Pym, also died in 1880.

Horace Pym then married Jane Hannah Backhouse Fox on 2 May 1881. She was the daughter of Barclay Fox, Caroline's brother and his wife, Jane (sister of Edmund Backhouse, Pym's first wife's father). Pym and Jane Fox Pym had two daughters.

== Work as Confidential Solicitor ==
He practised as a confidential solicitor as the Principal of Thathams & Pym, 3 Fredericks Place, Old Jewry, London EC.

== Pym as a person ==
Some anecdotes concerning Horace Pym and his family occur in the memoirs of Thomas Anstey Guthrie, the humorous writer (pen name "F. Anstey", who wrote the novel Vice Versa) Guthrie describes him as a long-standing friend and a great raconteur. The Obituary in The Times (11 May 1896) asserts that he was greatly valued by his friends, who included some notable writers and painters. Among these was the writer and literary editor, James Payn, who was also literary advisor to Smith, Elder & Co.,

In his beautiful home, "Foxwold" at Brasted near Sevenoaks in Kent, he had an excellent library. Horace Pym wrote a number of small books, which he had privately printed for his friends. Some of these, held by the British Library are listed below. He died on 5 May 1896. The Times Obituary states that "Himself a man of great cultivation and taste, he held in affection the great masters of English literature, reverencing in particular Charles Dickens and all that pertained to him . . . . Mr. Pym's death took place with a painful suddenness owing to an affection of the heart induced by Russian influenza."

== Notes and references ==
=== Books by Horace Pym listed in the catalogue of the British Library ===
- A Tour round my Book-shelves. 1891 (privately printed: 100 copies)
- Chats in the Book-room. 1896 (privately printed)
- PEPYS, Samuel. Excerpts from the Diary of Samuel Pepys. From the "Mynors Bright" edition. With an introduction by H.N. Pym 1889
- FOX, Caroline. Memories of Old Friends; being extracts from the journals and letters of C. F. ... from 1835 to 1871. Edited by H. N. Pym. pp. xxvii. 355. Smith, Elder & Co.: London, 1882 [1881]. Available online at The Internet Archive
- A mother's memoir : being a fragmentary sketch of the life of the late Edith Elizabeth Pym / by H. N. P. [i.e. Horace Noble Pym]. (Privately printed: 50 copies)
- Odds and Ends at Foxwold. A guide for the inquiring guest ... Illustrated, etc. 1887 (privately printed)
