= 1878 in the United Kingdom =

Events from the year 1878 in the United Kingdom.

== Incumbents ==
- Monarch – Victoria
- Prime Minister – Benjamin Disraeli (Conservative)

== Events ==
- 14 January – Alexander Graham Bell demonstrates the telephone to Queen Victoria.
- 23 January – Disraeli orders British fleet to the Dardanelles.
- 8 February – The British fleet enters Turkish waters and anchors off Constantinople. Russia threatens to occupy the Ottoman capital but does not act.
- 11 February – The first weekly weather report is published in the UK.
- 24 February – Anti-Russian demonstrations in Hyde Park, London.
- 12 March – Britain annexes Walvis Bay.
- 15 March – Restoration of the Scottish hierarchy of the Roman Catholic Church, carried out on the instructions of Pope Leo XIII.
- 24 March – The Royal Navy frigate HMS Eurydice (1843) capsizes off the Isle of Wight, killing all but two of the 319 crew.
- 25 March – Russia rejects a British proposal to lay the Treaty of San Stefano before a European congress.
- 27 March – In anticipation of war with Russia, Disraeli mobilises the reserves and calls Indian troops to Malta.
- 28 March – Stoke City F.C. move into their new stadium at the Victoria Ground, beating Talke Rangers 1–0 in a friendly in their first game there.
- 25 May – Opening of Gilbert and Sullivan's opera HMS Pinafore, at the Opera Comique on the Strand, London with a first run of 571 performances.
- 29 May – Foreign Office clerk Charles Thomas Marvin leaks the text of the following day's secret convention with Russia to the newspapers; he is arrested, but it is discovered that he has committed no offence in English Law at this time.
- 31 May – The Imperial German Navy ironclad turret ship SMS Grosser Kurfürst (1875) is accidentally rammed and sunk by SMS König Wilhelm on manoeuvres off Folkestone with the loss of more than 275 crew (an event witnessed by Arthur Sullivan).
- 1 June – The North British Railway's first Tay Bridge across the Firth of Tay at Dundee in Scotland is opened to public rail services; it is the world's longest bridge at this date.
- 4 June – Cyprus Convention: the Ottoman Empire cedes Cyprus to the United Kingdom but retains nominal title.
- 7 June – An underground explosion at Wood Pit, Haydock, kills at least 189.
- 10 June – Konrad Korzeniowski, the future novelist Joseph Conrad, sets foot on English soil for the first time, at Lowestoft from the SS Mavis.
- 4 July – Public Health (Water) Act obliges parishes to provide a supply of "wholesome water" within reasonable distance of every home.
- 7 August – The Christian Mission, co-founded by (the now) General William and Catherine Booth in London in 1865, has its name changed to The Salvation Army.
- 15 August – Selina Wadge is hanged at Bodmin Jail for the murder of her son.
- 3 September – Over 640 die when the crowded pleasure boat Princess Alice collides with the Bywell Castle in the River Thames.
- 11 September – An underground explosion at Abercarn, Monmouthshire kills 268 coal miners.
- 12 September – Cleopatra's Needle erected on the Victoria Embankment in London, having arrived in England on 21 January.
- October – The University of London becomes the first in the UK to admit women on equal terms with men.
- 14 October – the world's first recorded floodlit football fixture is played at Bramall Lane in Sheffield.
- 28 October – the first floodlit rugby match is played in Salford.
- 21 November – Syria–Lebanon campaign commences when the British attack Ali Masjid in the Khyber Pass.
- 26 November – James McNeill Whistler's libel case against critic John Ruskin over a review of the painting of the Thames Nocturne in Black and Gold – The Falling Rocket (in which Whistler is described as "flinging a pot of paint in the public's face") is decided in the High Court of Justice in London. Whistler wins a farthing in nominal damages and only half of the substantial costs.
- 13 December – Electric street lighting introduced in London, initially on the Thames Embankment (using Yablochkov candles, a form of arc lamp first demonstrated in London in 1876), followed by Waterloo Bridge.
- 18 December – Joseph Swan of Newcastle announces his invention of an incandescent light bulb.
- 30 December – Henry Irving's production of Hamlet, with himself in the title rôle playing opposite Ellen Terry as Ophelia, opens at the Lyceum Theatre, London.

=== Undated ===
- Dentists Act 1878 (41 & 42 Vict. c. 33) limits the title of "dentist" and "dental surgeon" to qualified and registered practitioners.
- William Crookes invents the Crookes tube which produces cathode rays.
- The following English Association football clubs are formed:
  - Everton F.C. in Liverpool, formed as St Domingo.
  - Grimsby Town F.C., formed as Grimsby Pelham.
  - Ipswich Town F.C., formed as Ipswich Amateur Football Club (they will not turn professional until 1936).
  - Newton Heath Lancashire and Yorkshire Railway Football Club, the team that will become Manchester United.
  - West Bromwich Albion F.C.
- International Tea Co. Stores established.
- William Frederick Yeames paints And When Did You Last See Your Father?.

== Publications ==
- A Dictionary of Music and Musicians edited by George Grove begins publication.
- Thomas Hardy's novel The Return of the Native is serialised.
- Richard Jefferies' collected essays The Gamekeeper at Home.

== Births ==
- 4 January
  - A. E. Coppard, short story writer and poet (died 1957)
  - Augustus John, painter (died 1961)
- 6 January – Marian Ellis, later Marian Cripps, Baroness Parmoor, pacifist (died 1952)
- 7 January – Samuel James Cameron, obstetrician (died 1959)
- 19 January – Herbert Chapman, football manager (died 1934)
- 23 January – Rutland Boughton, composer (died 1960)
- 3 March
  - Richard Meinertzhagen, soldier, intelligence officer and ornithologist (died 1967)
  - Edward Thomas, poet and writer (killed in action 1917)
- 16 April – Owen Thomas Jones, geologist (died 1967)
- 26 April – Eric Campbell, silent film star (died 1917)
- 1 June – John Masefield, poet and novelist (died 1967)
- 28 June – Evan Roberts, preacher (died 1951)
- 20 July – Denis Eden, painter (died 1949)
- 24 July – Lord Dunsany, author (died 1957)
- 23 November – Frank Pick, transport administrator and exponent of industrial design (died 1941)
- 1 September – J. F. C. Fuller, major-general and strategist (died 1966)
- 3 September – Dorothea Douglass Lambert Chambers, née Dorothea Katherine Douglass, tennis player (died 1960)
- 5 September – Barry Domvile, admiral and Nazi sympathiser (died 1971)
- 18 September – Robert Brooke-Popham, air chief marshal (died 1953)
- 31 December – Caradoc Evans, writer (died 1945)

== Deaths ==
- 12 March – Sir William Gibson-Craig, advocate and politician (born 1797)
- 16 March – William Banting, undertaker and dietician (born c.1796)
- 19 March – Henry Liddell, 1st Earl of Ravensworth, politician (born 1797)
- 27 March – Sir George Gilbert Scott, architect (born 1811)
- 18 April – Charles Fox, Quaker scientist (born 1797)
- 25 April – Anna Sewell, author (born 1820)
- 28 May – John Russell, 1st Earl Russell, Prime Minister of the United Kingdom (born 1792)
- 6 June – Robert Stirling, clergyman and inventor (born 1790)
- 17 June – Sir William Miles, 1st Baronet, politician (born 1797)
- 22 July – Samuel McGaw, Victoria Cross recipient (born 1838)
- 30 September – Evan James, poet, lyricist of the Welsh national anthem (born 1809)
- 20 November – William Thomas (Islwyn), Welsh poet (born 1832)
- 14 December – Princess Alice, member of the royal family (diphtheria) (born 1843)
- 24 December
  - Lucy Anderson, pianist (born 1797)
  - Sister Dora, Anglican nun and nurse (born 1832)
- 31 December – Sir James Matheson, Scottish politician (born 1796)
