= Gaisford =

Gaisford is a surname. Notable people with the surname include:

- John Gaisford (born 1934), English Anglican bishop
- Richard Gaisford, British newsreader
- Steve Gaisford, British newsreader
- Thomas Gaisford (1779–1855), English classical scholar and Anglican priest
