= William Noye =

William Noye may refer to:

- William Noy (1577–1634), British jurist
- William Noye (entomologist) (1814–1872), amateur entomologist
