= Sir John Percival =

1498 Lord Mayor of London

- Occupation: Tailor
- Spouse: Thomasine Bonaventure

Sir John Percival was a tailor who became Lord Mayor of London in 1498.

== Career ==
He was a member of the Worshipful Company of Merchant Taylors.

In 1486, he became Sheriff of London, sharing the role with Hugh Clopton.

In 1498, Percival became Lord Mayor of London.

== Personal life ==
He was the third husband of Thomasine Bonaventure. They had no children together.
