= Weekend Lunchtime =

Former weekend television news programme, broadcast on Sky News

- Presented by: Lorna Dunkley with Nick Powell
- Country of origin: United Kingdom

Production
- Running time: 120 Minutes (12:00pm-2:00pm)

Original release
- Network: Sky News

Weekend Lunchtime is a British lunchtime news programme airing between 12pm and 2pm on weekends which was broadcast on Sky News from 2007 to 2011. It featured a mix of news and sport. The slot was branded on air as Sky News with Lorna Dunkley & Nick Powell.
