= Serena Wadham =

British photographer

Serena Wadham (1930–2006) was a British photographer based in London and Cornwall.

Serena trained to be a photojournalist with Black Star around 1963. After a series of assignments producing portraits and covering news stories in London and Cornwall, she began to produce her own photographic studies of women at work. Her subjects included well-known figures such as Barbara Hepworth, Elisabeth Lutyens, and cellist Amaryllis Fleming, as well as a wide range of subjects including bus drivers, scientists, street vendors, and seamstresses.

During her time living in Islington (1960s-1987) Serena was a prolific street photographer, capturing the working class population and documenting immigrant communities. Her work covered protests, demonstrations and peace marches related to gender equality and non-nuclear proliferation.

In 1968, Serena travelled to Spain to cover a story on the Basques under Franco, as well as London protests against gender segregation at El Vino wine bar on Fleet Street, and the police raid on the Middle Earth club.

Wadham moved to Cornwall to live full-time in 1987, settling at Nancledra where she lived until her death in 2006.

Seven of Serena's photographs are held by the National Gallery. In 2008 an exhibition about her work was held at the Morrab Library in Penzance, curated by Robin Lenman, editor of the Oxford Companion to the Photograph.

Serena Wadham's photographic collection was gifted by her family to the Morrab Library where it is being catalogued and digitised.
