= Pierre de la Place =

French Huguenot martyr

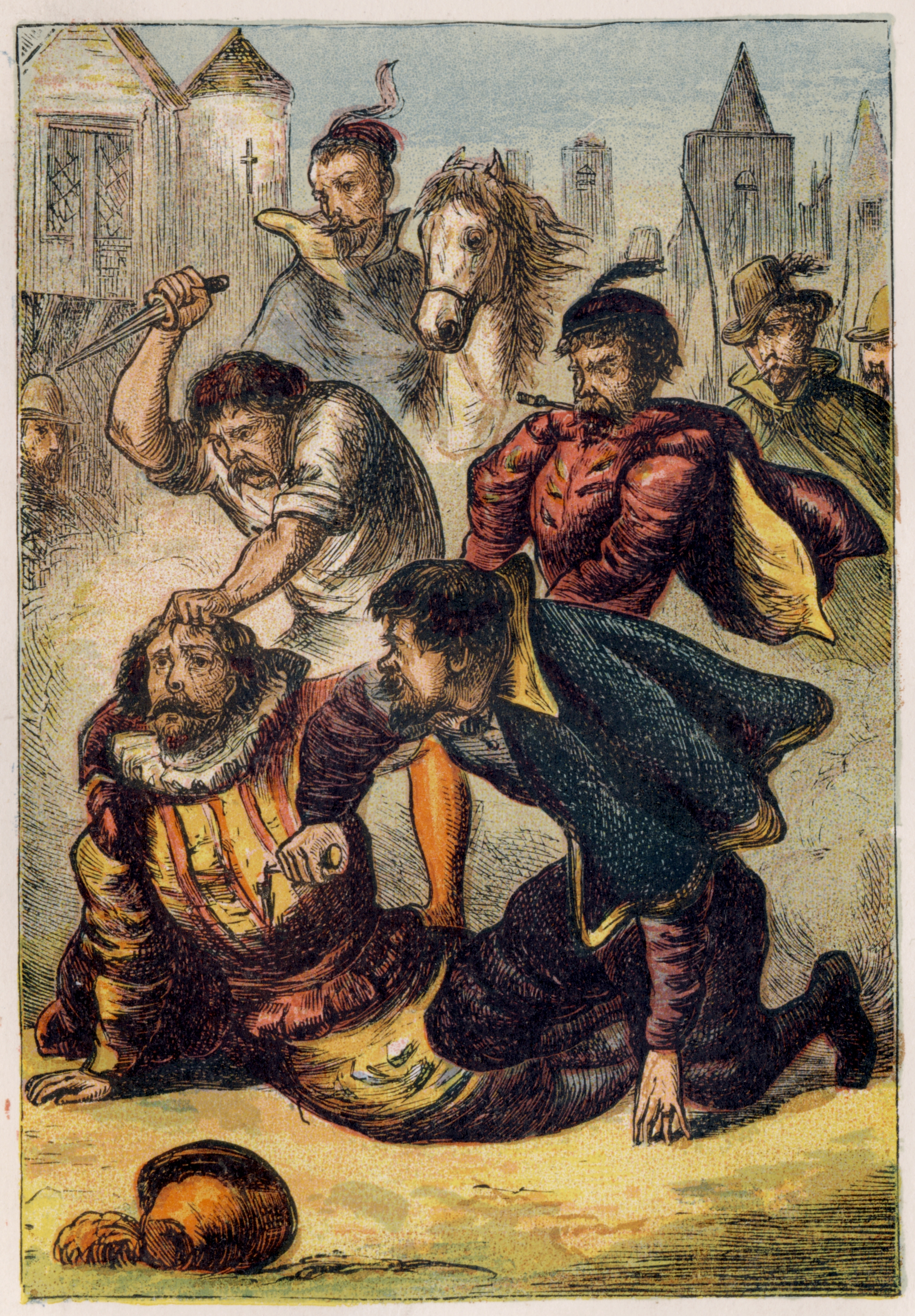
"Assassination of la Place" from an 1887 edition of Foxe's Book of Martyrs illustrated by Kronheim

Pierre de la Place (ca. 1520, Angoulême – 25 August 1572, Paris) was a French Huguenot martyr, who died a few days after the 1572 St. Bartholomew's Day Massacre of the Huguenots. According to Foxe, he was informed of the massacre, and ordered to report to the King, to await the King's pleasure. He fled, but was unable to find shelter with any Catholics, and eventually returned to his house and fortified himself in, leading his wife and servants in prayer while he waited. He was eventually obliged to leave with the King's men, who led him into the clutches of assassins who killed him. His corpse was placed in a stable, where it was desecrated with horse dung (later thrown into the river), and his house was plundered.

== Family ==
Pierre de La Place was the cousin of French Protestant theologian Josué de la Place and the great-great-great-grandfather of eighteenth century writer and playwright Pierre-Antoine de La Place, the first French translator of Shakespeare.

== Works ==
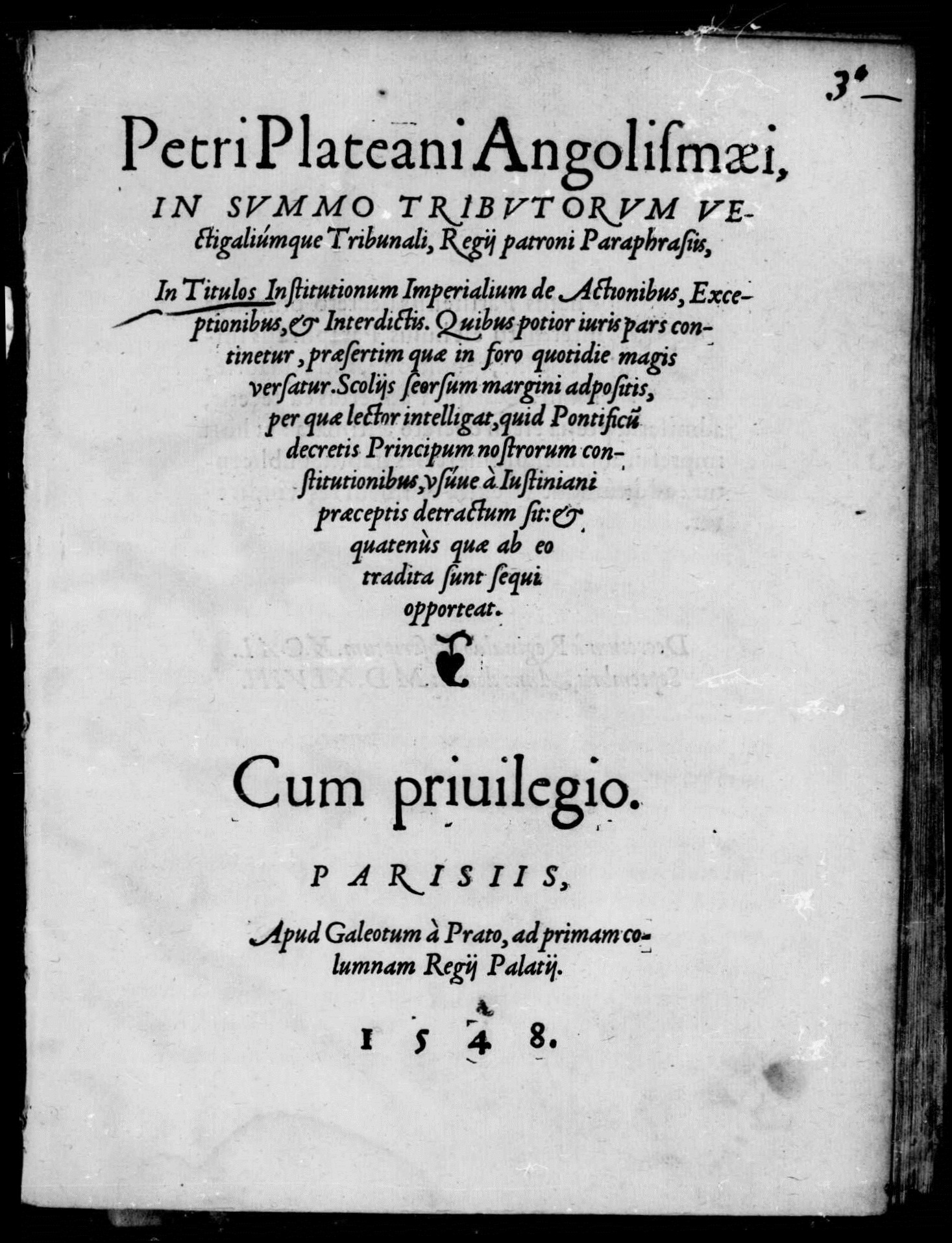
Paraphrasis in titulos institutionum imperialium de actionibus, exceptionibus et interdictis, 1548

- Paraphrase de quelques titres des Institutes, Paris, 1542.
- Paraphrasis in titulos institutionum imperialium de actionibus, exceptionibus et interdictis (in Latin). Paris: Galliot Du Pré. 1548.
- Treatise De la vocation et manière de vivre à laquelle chacun est appelé, Paris, 1561 and 1574.
- Treatise Du droit usage de la philosophie morale avec la doctrine chrétienne, Paris, 1562 and Leyde, 1658.
- Commentaires de l’état de la religion et de la république sous les rois Henri & François seconds & Charles neuvième (in 7 editions), 1565 (translated in Latin in 2 volumes in 1575-77 and inserted in Mémoires sur l’histoire de France).
- Treatise De l’excellence de l’homme chrétien et manière de le connaître, 1572 (or 1575?), published by P. de Farnace.
- Discours politiques sur la voie d’entrer dûment aux États et manière de constamment s’y maintenir et gouverner (adapted from "De la vocation et manière de vivre à laquelle chacun est appelé"), English translation, London, 1578.
