= Anne Dowriche =

English poet and historian

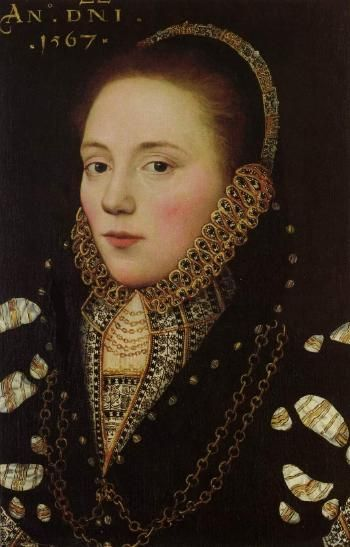
- Born: before 1560
- Died: after 1613
- Genre: poetry
- Notable works: The French Historie
- Spouse: Hugh Dowrich

Anne Dowriche (before 1560 – after 1613) was an English poet and historian of the 16th century. Anne Dowriche was the daughter of Sir Richard Edgecombe and Elizabeth Tregian Edgecombe, who were from a prominent family in Cornwall. In 1580, she married a Puritan minister from Devon, with whom she had several children.

Dowriche wrote The French Historie about the French Wars of Religion, "a 2,400 line poem, a long and inherently gory narrative epic about the long-winded French Wars of Religion during the C16", in which she speaks out against tyranny and justifies the Protestant Reformation. She described several tyrants who were slain by subjects and gave an account of the gruesome death of Charles IX of France, during whose reign the St. Bartholomew's Day massacre had taken place. After this, she addressed Elizabeth I of England, calling upon her to protect and lead her Protestant subjects.

Dowriche also wrote Verses Written by a Gentlewoman, upon the Jailor's Conversion. She is also credited for writing other poetry that has not survived.

== Biography ==
=== Early life ===
Anne Edgecombe was born into the English gentry. The Edgecombe family owned land and held a degree of economic and political power. The Edgecombes were ardent followers of the Protestant religion, which made them part of a minority in England and Europe as a whole. They were connected to a network of Protestants who used available literary talent, wealth, and power to promote Protestant causes. Anne was well educated as a girl, which is one indicator of her privileged social class. Some of Anne's writing suggests that she may have been able to read Latin, which would be further evidence of the extent of her education.

Some members of the Edgecombe family supported controversial Protestant activists. For instance, Anne's brother Richard supported the Calvinist minister Melanchthon Jewell. Jewell preached illegally and was repeatedly imprisoned for his religious and political convictions. Despite this type of religious oppression, the Protestant faith was a cornerstone in Dowriche's life and she was devoted to Protestant causes. Though she was limited by her gender at a time when women could not own property, Dowriche used her talents as a writer to promote her views.

The writer Anne Locke was a fellow Protestant reformer who was connected to Dowriche through intermarried family members. Like Dowriche, Anne Locke was a female poet who also wrote in support of the Protestant faith. Some scholars have noted similarities between Locke's poem entitled "The Necessitie and Benefite of Affliction", and Dowriche's "Verses Written by a Gentlewoman, Upon the Jaylor's Conversion". Both poems advocate Protestantism and encourage the reader to repent and follow God. Some scholars speculate that, given the women's geographic and ideological proximity, Dowriche and Locke may have directly impacted one another's writing.

=== Marriage ===
In 1580 Anne Edgecombe married Rev. Hugh Dowrich, rector of Honiton in Devon, the second son of Thomas Dowrish (d.1590) of Dowrish in the parish of Sandford, near Crediton, Devon. A small painted heraldic escutcheon survives on wood panelling at Dowrich displaying the arms of Dowrich (Argent, a bend cotised sable a bordure engrailed of the last) impaling Edgcumbe (Gules, on a bend ermine cottised or three boar's heads couped argent).

The ancient gentry family of Dowrish had become established at Dowrish before the reign of King John (1199–1216), when they built the keep or gatehouse, which survives there today. Anne and Hugh were united by their religious convictions, as both were ardent Protestants at a time when Europe was predominantly Catholic. Anne and Hugh had 6 children, Elkana, Walter, Mary (born 1587), Elizabeth, Anne (born 1589), and Hugh (born 1594).

=== Politics ===
A Protestant, Dowriche supported Queen Elizabeth I, who faced death threats because she led a Protestant regime. Controversially, Dowriche was a proponent of eradicating the Catholic faith, arguing that Protestantism was the rightful path to God. Dowriche was linked to other Protestants who also held the radical belief that Catholicism should be abolished.

== Works ==
Dowriche's writings focus on the Protestant faith and what she viewed as the rightful path to God. In her poem The French Historie, Dowriche wrote about the plight of French Protestants, a religious group which was persecuted during the 16th century.

=== The French Historie ===
Dowriche published her 2,400-line poem The French Historie in 1589. The poem is a fictionalized retelling of the French Wars of Religion, a bloody conflict primarily occurring between Catholics and Huguenots from 1562 to 1598. Huguenots were French Protestants who harshly criticized the Catholic Church. They were widely persecuted in France, which led to a mass exodus of Huguenots to other countries. Dowriche recalls the persecution of Huguenots with tales of Huguenot martyrs. By poetically describing the Huguenots' resistance in the face of Catholic persecution, Dowriche endeavored to inspire English Protestants to rebel against Catholicism.

The French Historie opens with a fictional exchange between an Englishman and a Huguenot refugee from France. Their exchange acts as a frame for the narrative of the poem, a common device in Elizabethan writing. The plight of the Huguenots in The French Historie echoes the stories of suffering and redemption of the Israelites in the Old Testament. Dowriche's allusions to both contemporary and biblical texts are evidence that she was well read, an unusual trait for the majority of English women at this time.

The French Historie chronicles three pivotal events in the French Wars of Religion, beginning with an uprising against Huguenots in Paris. The poem then moves to the execution of Anne du Bourg, a counselor in the Parliament of Paris who opposed using capital punishment for crimes of heresy. The third major event of the poem is a retelling of the bloody St. Bartholomew's Day Massacre, an attack against Huguenots which began in Paris in 1572 and spread throughout France. Dowriche imagines the queen of France, the devoutly Catholic Catherine de Medici, fiercely proposing the infamous St. Bartholomew's Day Massacre. While St. Bartholomew's Massacre was a real series of events, Dowriche invented the detail that Catherine de Medici proposed the killings. Though Catherine de Medici is a villainous character in The French Historie, Dowriche also imbues her and other female characters with capabilities which were traditionally ascribed only to men. Dowriche's imagining of de Medici's power, will, and ruthlessness subverts traditional representations of women as meek and submissive.

In The French Historie, Dowriche characterizes the targeted murders of Huguenots as the work of Satan. Satan appears in the text to influence Catherine de Medici and others to commit atrocities. Dowriche sympathetically portrays Huguenot scholars and preachers who were martyred for their religious beliefs. Ultimately, the French narrator calls on Queen Elizabeth to defend Protestants in England.

=== In relation to other literary works ===
For historical information, Dowriche consulted Thomas Tymme's The Three Partes of Commentaries, Containing the Whole and Perfect Discourse of the Civill Warres of Fraunce. Tymme's work is a translation of an earlier historical account written by Pierre de La Place, who was killed during the St. Bartholomew's Day Massacre. Numerous scholars argue that Dowriche's The French Historie may have inspired Christopher Marlowe's The Jew of Malta. The Jew of Malta, in turn, influenced William Shakespeare's The Merchant of Venice.

=== "Verses Written by a Gentlewoman, Upon the Jaylor's Conversion" ===
Anne Dowriche published her poem "Verses Written by a Gentlewoman, Upon a Jaylor's Conversion" in her husband Hugh's 1596 work, The Jaylor's Conversion. The Jaylor's Conversion is a sermon describing Acts 16:30, in which the jailer of Paul and Silas experiences a conversion. Hugh argued that this sermon, which he delivered 16 years before it was published, was relevant once more due to what he saw as a time of spiritual regression. Anne's poem "Verses Written by a Gentlewoman, Upon the Jaylor's Conversion" occurs in the prefatory material of Hugh's sermon and follows a ballad meter. In her poem she criticizes magistrates who mask the truth as "sedition and conspiracy". Both Anne and Hugh praise believers who are willing to repent and sacrifice for God. They also emphasize willingness to suffer for one's faith through imprisonment and are strongly anti-Catholic. In this respect, their writings are in keeping with the Puritan faction of the church, which also focused on resisting Catholicism. The Jaylor's Conversion urges readers to completely submit to the Bible's authority and admonishes what the Dowriche's view as rampant spiritual lethargy. The Jaylor's Conversion would have found a receptive audience among the network of Protestant activists and believers connected to Anne Dowriche.
