= Susan Elizabeth Gay =

Susan Elizabeth Gay (born 12 January 1845 in Oswestry, died 17 January 1918 in Crill, Budock) was a chronicler of Falmouth in a book published in 1903 entitled Old Falmouth.

Miss Susan Gay was the daughter of William Gay (1812–1868) and his wife, Charlotte Grace Elizabeth, born Pedersen and the granddaughter of William Gay, the last Falmouth Agent of the General Post Office Packet Service (Old Falmouth, pp. 139–140, 204–206), who retired in 1842.

She was a friend of the Fox family of Falmouth, who provided some of her material (pp. 149–160, 219–222) and illustrations (George Croker Fox p. 149, Anna Maria Fox p. 151, Robert Were Fox FRS p. 153, Joseph Fox, Senior p. 159). Wilson Fox helped her with the Chronology. In her preface, she acknowledges help from them and other Falmouth notables. She ends the preface "I should mention that this little work is simply a Collecteana, and has no greater pretension" (page x).

Miss Gay was also a writer on Theosophy, sometimes using the non-de-plume "Libra".

She was one of the speakers at a celebration of the thirty-second anniversary of Modern Spiritualism on Sunday 4 April 1880, advertised in The Times.

In 1910 or 1911, she was interviewed by Walter Evans-Wentz concerning folktales heard from the peasants around her home at Crill, near Falmouth, published in The Fairy-faith in Celtic Countries.

== Publications ==
- Harry’s Big Boots. A fairy tale, for “Small Folke” ... With illustrations by the author, drawn on wood by P. Skelton.London, 1873.
- Woman and a Future Life, London, Houlston & Sons, 1876.
- Womanhood in its eternal aspect. Reprinted from Modern Thought, 15 Dec. 1879. pp. 4., 1879.
- Spiritualistic Sanity: A reply to Dr. F. Winslow’s “Spiritualistic Madness.”. London, Falmouth, 1879.
- John William Fletcher, clairvoyant. A biographical sketch, with some chapters on the present era and religious reform. E. W. Allen: London, 1883.
- The spirit of the New Testament, or The revelation of the mission of Christ. By a woman, London: E. W. Allen, 1885.
- The Parish Church of Falmouth. Falmouth : F.I. Earle, 1897.
- Falmouth and Flushing a Hundred Years Ago : Some Extracts From James Silk Buckingham's Autobiography / By a Falmouth Resident. Falmouth : Printed by Earle, 1895.
- Commanders in H.M. Packet Service from 1688 to 1852 : reprinted from the published record at Falmouth / preface by S. E. G. [Miss Gay]. Falmouth : J.H.Lake, 1898.
- Old Falmouth : the story of the town from the days of the Killigrews to the earliest part of the 19th century. London : Headley Brothers, 1903.
- Old Falmouth, [new abridged ed.] Penzance : Oakmagic Publications, 2000. ISBN 1-901163-59-8 Notes: This is a considerably shortened version of the original work. Originally published: London : Headley Brothers, 1903.
- The mystic and occult knowledge of the early Christian Church : an address given in Falmouth on May 9th 1913 / by Susan E. Gay. London : Theosophical Society, 1913?

=== Parish records transcripts ===
- [Truro. St. Mary Church]. The register of marriages, baptisms and burials of the parish of St. Mary, Truro, Cornwall A.D. 1597 to 1837 / transcribed and edited by Susan E. Gay, Mrs. Howard Fox, Stella Fox, H. Tapley-Soper, parts 1 and 2, Exeter : Devon and Cornwall Record Society, 1940.
- [Falmouth. King Charles the Martyr]. The register of baptisms, marriages and burials of the parish of Falmouth in the County of Cornwall, 1663-1812. Part II, (burials) / transcribed and edited by Susan Elizabeth Gay and Mrs. Howard Fox, Exeter : Devon and Cornwall Record Society, 1915.
