= William Noye (entomologist) =

English entomologist

- Born: 1814; Paul, Cornwall, England
- Died: 1872 (aged 57–58); Australia
- Known for: Entomology

William Noye (1814 – 1 November 1872) was an English amateur entomologist and his paper on insects found in the Land's End district was the first published account of the Cornish Lepidoptera.

== List of publications ==
1. Noye, W. (1846) "List of Insects (Lepidoptera) found in the district of the Land's End". Transactions of the Natural History and Antiquarian Society of Penzance. 1: 90–94.
2. Noye, W. (1846) "Observations on the Death's-head Moth (Acherontia atropos)". Transactions of the Natural History and Antiquarian Society of Penzance. 1: 122.
3. Noye, W. (1846) "Capture of Acherontia atropos at Land's End 28.4.1846". Zoologist. 4: 1345.
4. Noye, W. (1847) "Lists of Insects (Lepidoptera) found in the district of the Land's End". Transactions of the Natural History and Antiquarian Society of Penzance. 1: 164–168.
5. Noye, W. (1848) "Lists of Insects (Lepidoptera) found in the district of the Land's End". Transactions of the Natural History and Antiquarian Society of Penzance. 1: 203–210.

== See also ==
- Penzance Natural History and Antiquarian Society
- List of people from Cornwall
