= Penjerrick Garden =

Garden in Cornwall, United Kingdom

Coordinates: 50.1347°N 5.1074°W

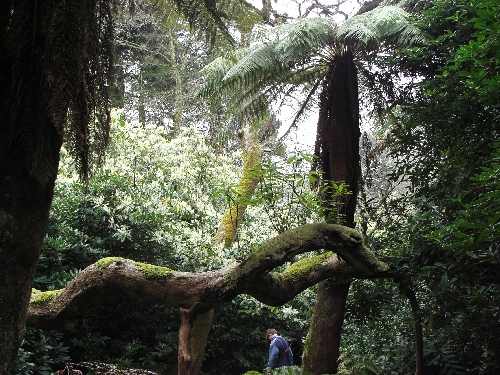
Somewhere in the lower garden

Penjerrick Garden (Cornish: Lowarth Pennanserik) – often referred to as "Cornwall's true jungle garden" – lies between Budock Water and Mawnan Smith, near Falmouth, United Kingdom. Established in the early 19th century by Robert Were Fox F.R.S. and his children, Anna Maria, Barclay and Caroline (R. W. Fox's brother, Charles was responsible for the Garden at Trebah and his brother, Alfred, for the garden at Glendurgan), the 15-acre (61,000 m^{2}), sub-tropical, spring-flowering garden has views of Budock Water and a considerable historical and botanical interest.

The founders planted the upper garden with specimens from abroad including rhododendrons, camellias, magnolias, azaleas, tree ferns and bamboos. The garden is also home to the Penjerrick and Barclayi hybrid rhododendrons. The skeleton of a brain coral brought to Penjerrick by Captain FitzRoy of the Beagle (that was Charles Darwin's expedition ship) can be found in the garden.

The lower part of Penjerrick is a dense valley garden reached by a wooden bridge. In this wild, jungle-like setting are four ponds and countless tree ferns that date back almost to the original planting of the garden. The tranquil garden (now owned by Rachel Morin) is at its best in April and May.

== Images ==
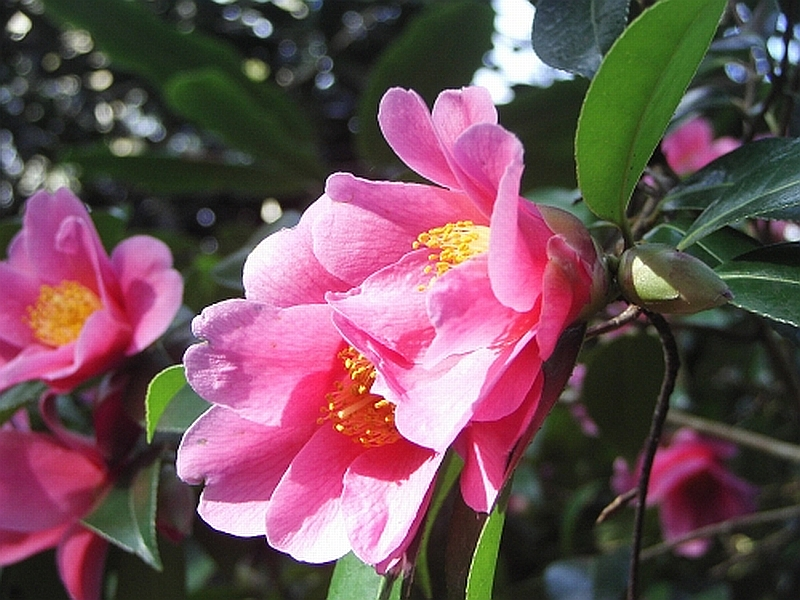
A Camellia in full bloom

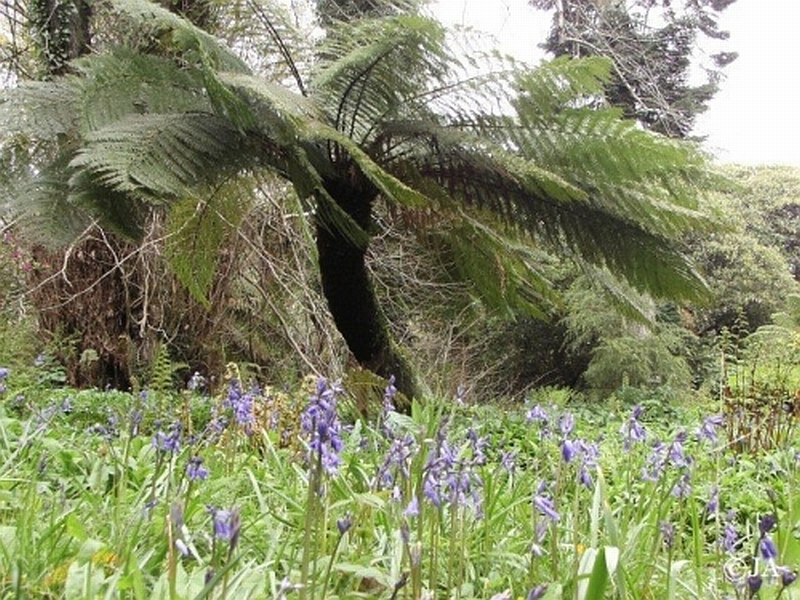
Bluebells in April

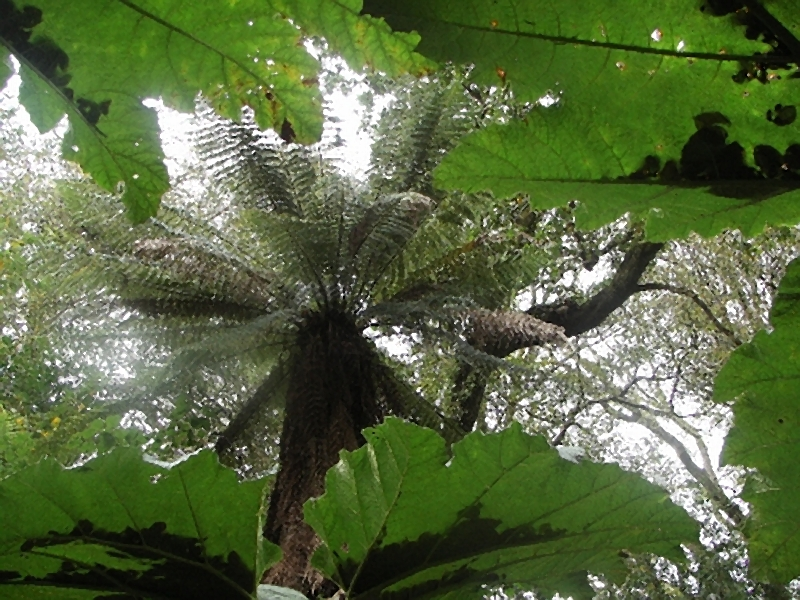
Gunnera in the shade of a tree fern
