= Richard Gaisford =

British journalist

Richard Gaisford is a British journalist for Al Jazeera. He previously worked on ITV Breakfast programmes between 2000 and 2025, where he started as the Chief Correspondent of GMTV. He later joined GMTV's successor Daybreak in 2010 in the same role. He continued as the Chief Correspondent of Good Morning Britain from 2014, as well as being an occasional relief newsreader on the programme. Richard occasional reported for the ITV Lunchtime News. He left ITV Breakfast in 2025.

In 2011, Gaisford was chosen to travel with Prince William and Kate Middleton to Canada on their first Royal Tour. He has also reported on the funerals of Pope John Paul II and Nelson Mandela. Additionally, Gaisford anchored coverage of the 2008 Olympics from Beijing and reported from South Africa during the World Cup in 2010 for GMTV.

He broadcast live from the devastated cities close to Fukushima, having previously reported from Thailand and Indonesia following the 2004 Indian Ocean earthquake and tsunami.

In March 2026, Gaisford joined Al Jazeera as a freelance International Correspondent and works predominantly in the Washington DC bureau for their 'This is America' programme, highlighting key issues in the USA.

== Filmography ==
Television

Year	Title	Role	Notes
2000–2010	GMTV	Chief Correspondent / Relief News Presenter	Weekdays
2003–2005	The Sunday Programme	Reporter	
2010–2014	Daybreak	Chief Correspondent, Stand-in Presenter (2010)	Weekdays
2014-2025	Good Morning Britain	Chief Correspondent, Stand-in Newsreader	Weekdays
2014-	Lorraine	Correspondent	Occasional
2015-	ITV News	News Correspondent	Occasional
2026-	Al Jazeera	International Correspndent	Freelance

== Personal life ==
His brother (Steve Gaisford) is also a journalist.
