= Cassandra Latham =

British witch

Cassandra Latham-Jones is a British witch. She lives and works in the small community of St Buryan, Cornwall.

She is notable as being the first person in the UK to have registered her occupation as village witch with the Inland Revenue in the year 1996. Her services were especially required by hospital patients. Within one year she was having so many requests for her services that she became a self-employed witch and was no longer financially supported by the government.

She was previously a committee member of the Pagan Federation as vice president overseeing campaigning.

In the late 1980s Latham was a student at the experimental Dartington College of Arts, where she completed a bachelor's degree in theatre. Before enrolling in this program she had served as a nurse, caring for the builder of the Minack Theatre, Rowena Cade in the last years of her life. Cassandra's business partner Laetitia utilises Aromatherapy, Reflexology, Indian Head Massage and Reiki. She also has a certificate as a sexual abuse and Crisis and Trauma counsellor specialising in assisting former members of religious cults.
