= Caroline Fox =

English diarist and correspondent (1819–1871)

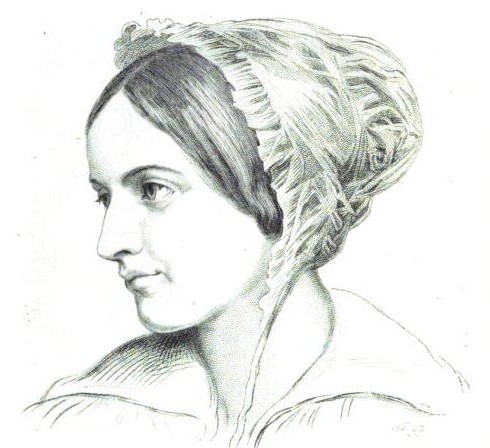
Caroline Fox

Caroline Fox (24 May 1819 – 12 January 1871) was an English diarist and correspondent from Cornwall. Her diary records memories of major writers, who include John Stuart Mill and Thomas Carlyle.

== Biography ==
Caroline Fox was born on 24 May 1819 at Penjerrick, near Falmouth, to Robert Were Fox, an inventor, and Maria Barclay. Both were Quakers. She was the younger sister of Barclay Fox, also a diarist, and of Anna Maria Fox.

Caroline's diaries record memories of people such as John Stuart Mill, John Sterling and Thomas Carlyle. Selections from her diary and letters (1835–1871) appeared as Memories of Old Friends: Caroline Fox of Penjerrick, Cornwall. A selection from the Victorian edition appeared in 1972.

With two of her siblings, Fox helped found the Falmouth Polytechnic, later the Royal Cornwall Polytechnic Society.

Caroline Fox died on 12 January 1871 at Penjerrick and was buried at a Quaker cemetery in Budock.
