= Bodmin Jail =

Historic former prison in Cornwall, England

Coordinates: 50°28′29″N 4°43′41″W

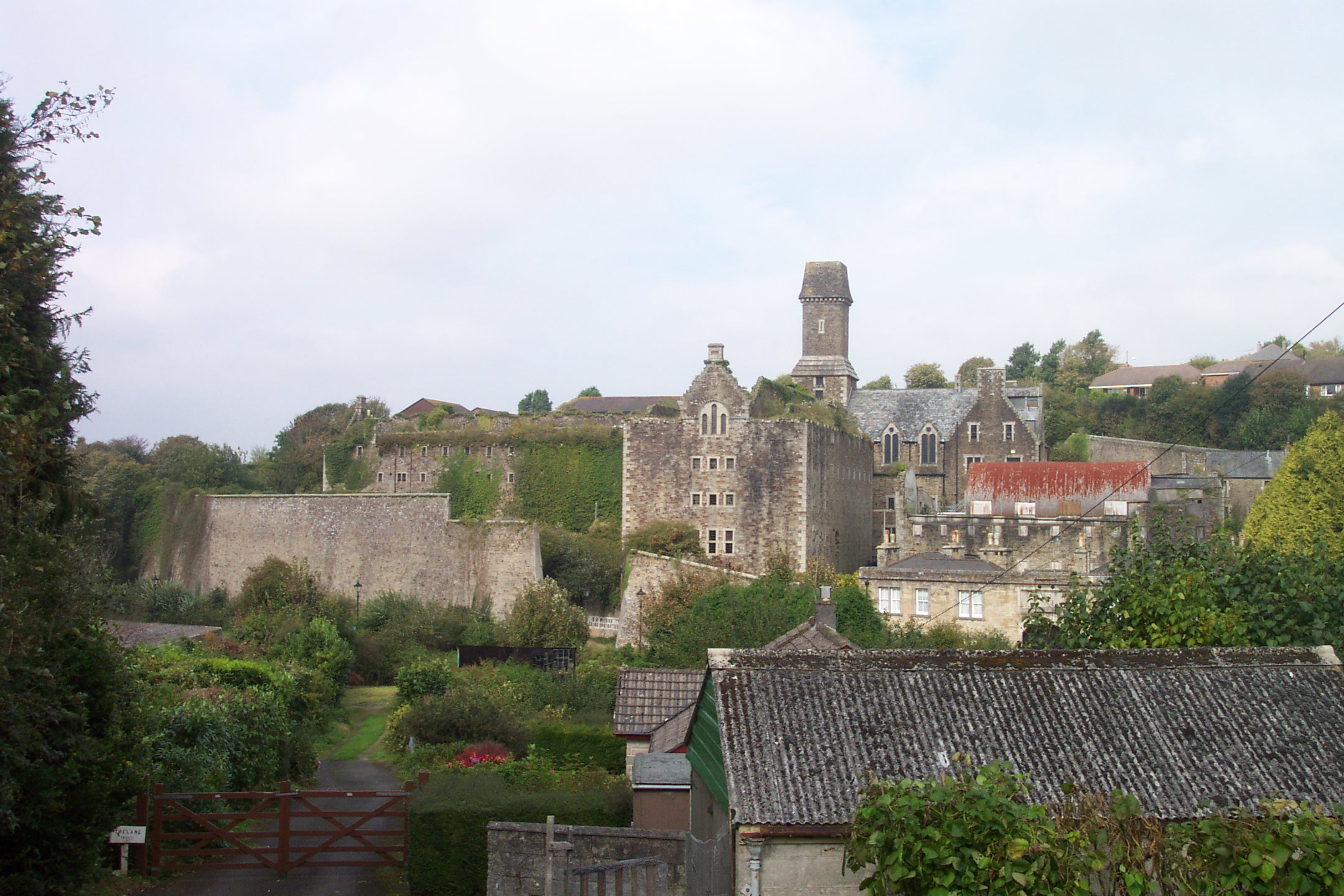
- Bodmin Jail as seen from Cardell Road in 2010
- Alternative names: Bodmin Gaol

General information
- Status: Converted to attraction and hotel.
- Type: Former prison, current tourist attraction
- Location: Bodmin, England
- Opened: 1779
- Renovated: 2015 - 2017
- Closed: Jail closed in 1927, later reopened as a tourist attraction.
- Renovation cost: £8.5 million

Design and construction
- Architect: Sir John Call

Other information
- Parking: Public car park nearby

Website
- http://www.bodminjail.org/

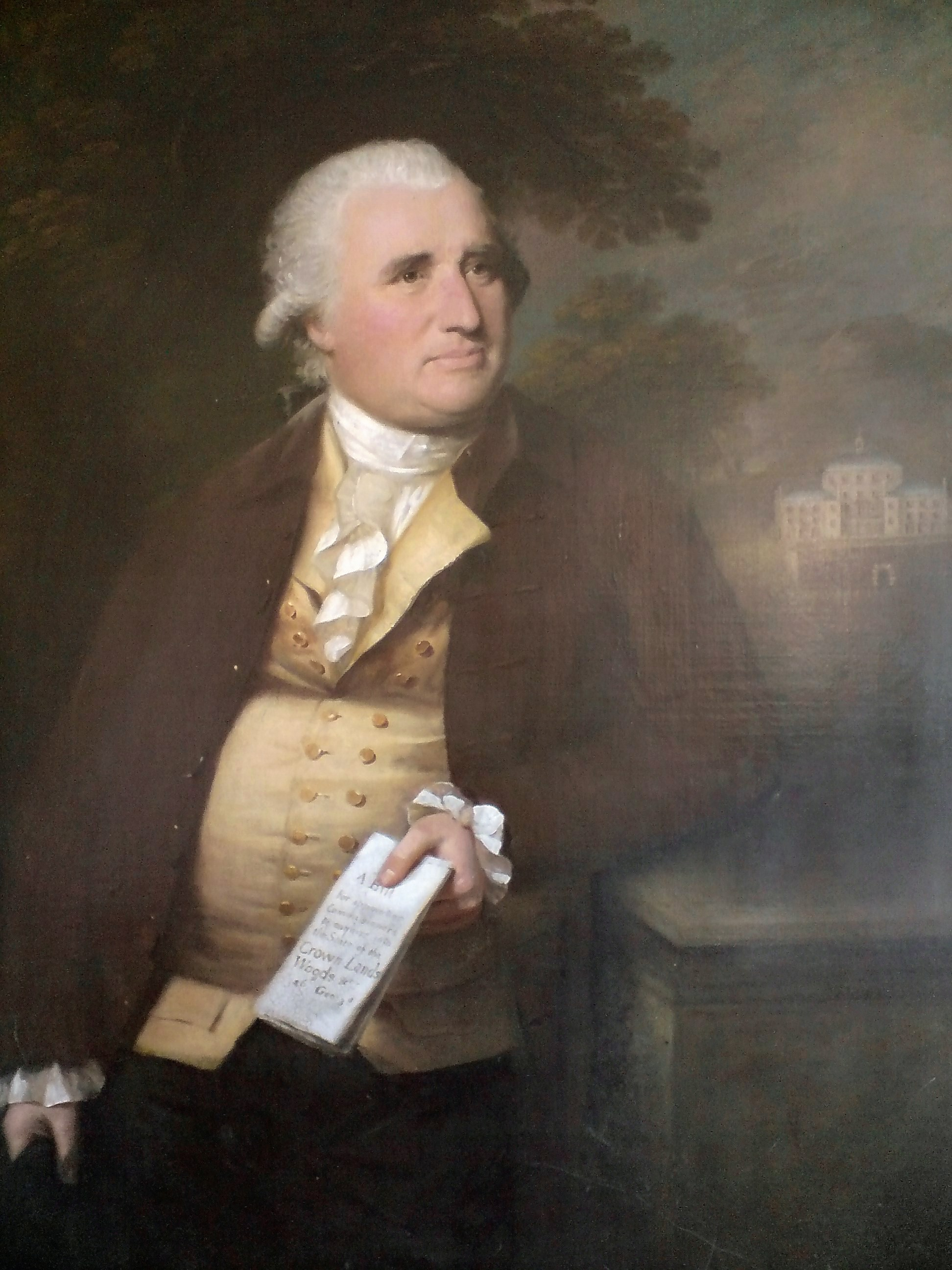
1779 oil painting of Sir John Call with Bodmin Jail in the background, artist unknown

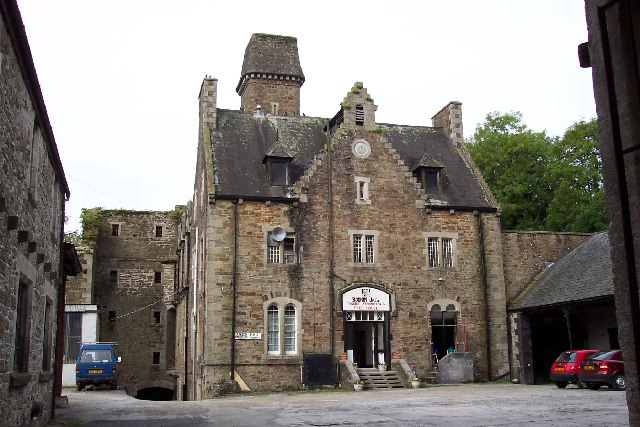
The restored portion of Bodmin Jail (the building in the middle contains a pub and exhibition)

Bodmin Jail (alternatively Bodmin Gaol) is a historic former prison situated in Bodmin, on the edge of Bodmin Moor in Cornwall. Built in 1779 and closed in 1927, a large range of buildings fell into ruin, but parts of the prison have been turned into a tourist attraction, and more recently another large part was converted into a hotel.

== History ==
=== 1779 - 1927 ===
Bodmin Gaol was designed by Sir John Call and built in 1779 by prisoners of war, and was operational for 150 years, in which it saw over 50 public hangings. It was the first British prison to hold prisoners in individual cells.

The jail closed in 1927. Since that date, there has been no prison within the county of Cornwall.

During the latter part of World War I, the prison was used for holding some of Britain's "State Papers and Records" including the Domesday Book. The material was in the jail from February 1918 to February 1919.

=== 1927 - Today ===
Bodmin Jail is now a hotel as of 2021 and after redevelopment that started in 2015, Bodmin Jail Limited now operates as a museum, gift shop and hosts guided tours at the site.

A number of guided tours take place at the jail, including a heritage tour, paranormal walk, and self-guided tour. The attraction includes original jail cells, an administration block, and a recreation of Bodmin Moor located where the old hospital wing used to be.

The paranormal tours include a ghost-hunting experience, where guests can use tools such as ouija boards to attempt to communicate with spirits.

== Ghosts ==
Bodmin Jail has inspired many ghost stories, attracted paranormal researchers, and ghost walk events are held for tourists there.

=== Most Haunted ===
Series 6, Episode 1 of Most Haunted, a British-made reality TV show, saw the crew attempt their paranormal activities at the jail with presenter Yvette Fielding and medium, Derek Acorah. After many unsuccessful attempts, the team supposedly made contact with many light and sound entities, whilst Acorah claimed to have been possessed by a spirit named Kreed Kafer, a South African.

It was later revealed that "Kreed Kafer" was a fictional character, who was created purely by parapsychologist and crew member Ciarán O'Keeffe, to test Derek Acorah and his abilities. The name was created because it was an anagram of the phrase 'Derek Faker'.

== Notable former inmates ==
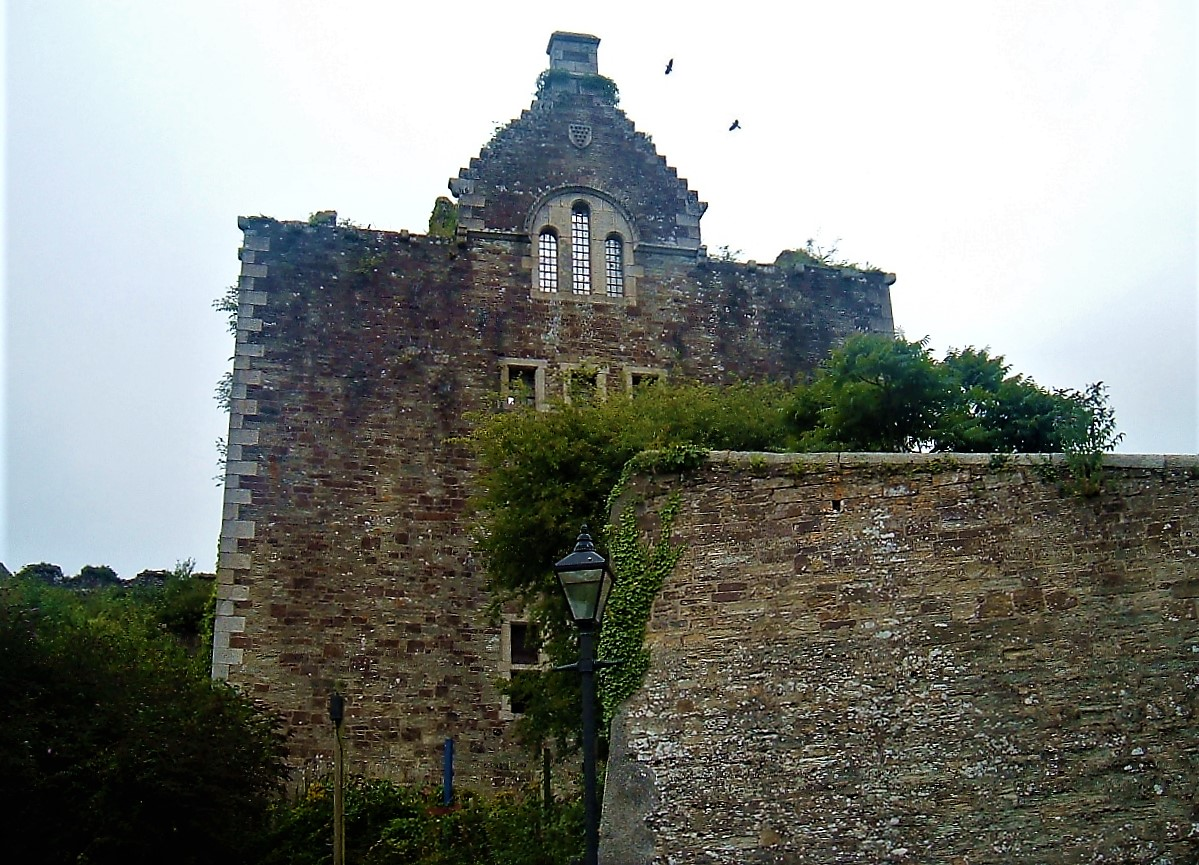
The naval prison

- F. Digby Hardy, inmate of the naval prison
- Selina Wadge, executed in 1878
