= Anna Maria Fox =

English painter (1816–1897)

Anna Maria Fox (21 February 1816 – 18 November 1897) was a promoter of the Royal Cornwall Polytechnic Society and the artistic and cultural development of Falmouth in Cornwall, UK.

== Family links ==
Anna Maria Fox was the eldest child of Robert Were Fox FRS (26 April 1789 – 25 July 1877) and Maria Barclay (1785–1858), his wife.

Her father was a member of the Quaker Fox family of Falmouth and her mother of the Quaker Barclay family of Bury Hill, near Dorking. Her maternal grandmother was a first cousin of Elizabeth Fry.

Her siblings were Barclay Fox (6 September 1817 – 10 March 1855) and Caroline Fox (24 May 1819 – 12 January 1871). The family lived at Rosehill and Penjerrick

She never married. With her sister, Caroline, she raised the four sons of her brother, Barclay, after the death of their parents.

Anna Maria outlived her sister by sixteen years, which Thomas Hodgkin described as a "widowhood". She died aged 81 on 18 November 1897 and was buried at the Quaker Burial Ground in Budock, in the same plot as her sister, Caroline

== The Journals ==
In their teenage years, Robert Were Fox challenged his children to keep journals, offering a guinea reward for the first year completed. All three kept journals for many years.

Anna Maria commissioned a relative by marriage, Horace Pym, to edit and publish her sister's journal. The book Memories of old friends was published by Smith, Elder & Co. ten years after Caroline Fox's death. It sold well. Before her death, Anna Maria arranged for all the original volumes of Caroline's journals to be burnt. A further selection from Memories of old friends, edited by Wendy Monk, was published in 1972.

Barclay Fox's journal, edited by Raymond Brett, was published in 1979.

Anna Maria gave instructions that "no word of my journal is to be published".

View of the "Poly" building in Church Street, Falmouth

== Royal Cornwall Polytechnic Society ==
The idea for the foundation of the Royal Cornwall Polytechnic Society was created by Anna Maria, Barclay and Caroline Fox, in 1832, when they were 17, 16 and 13, respectively. Their parents, uncles and aunts and their friends took up the idea with enthusiasm.

In 1896, Anna Maria Fox was elected as Vice-Patroness of the Poly, sharing this role with the Prince of Wales.

The Poly is based in Church Street, Falmouth and operates as a cultural venue.

== Painting and art education ==
Fox was a good amateur painter and organised of the Art section of the Annual Exhibition at the "Poly". The Cornwall Art Union was formed in 1852, associated with the Poly. Art classes run by the Poly were a precursor of the Falmouth School of Art.

== Commemoration ==
The first purpose-built building of the Falmouth School of Art, in Arwenack Street, was given in memory of Anna Maria Fox. The building, officially opened in August 1902 was refurbished in 2007.

In 2016 a year of community-centred events celebrated Fox's 200th birthday. Led by Scary Little Girls, the project gathered oral testimonies from members of the Fox family, local residents with ties to Anna Maria's legacy, and people associated with the gardens, arts school buildings and societies she founded. These histories were then commemorated with special blue fox plaques, linked together into a heritage trail by an app developed in partnership with Falmouth Arts School and University. Scary Little Girls collaborated with The Poly, Falmouth University, Falmouth School of Art, Mawnan Church of England VA Primary School, the Fox family, Falmouth History Group and heritage volunteers to document Anna Maria Fox.

== Gallery: Falmouth School of Art's first building ==
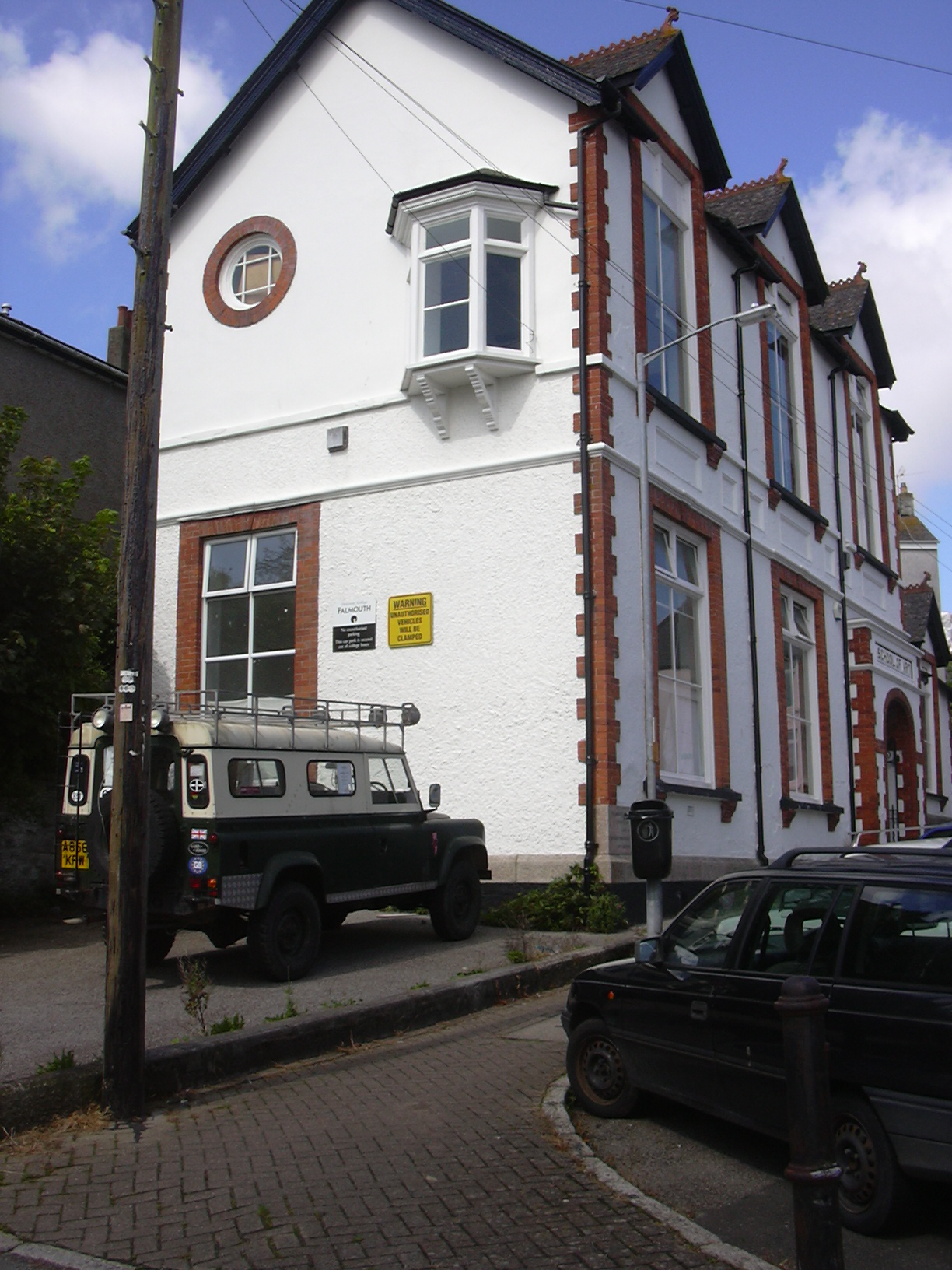
Falmouth School of Art - original building opened in August 1902.

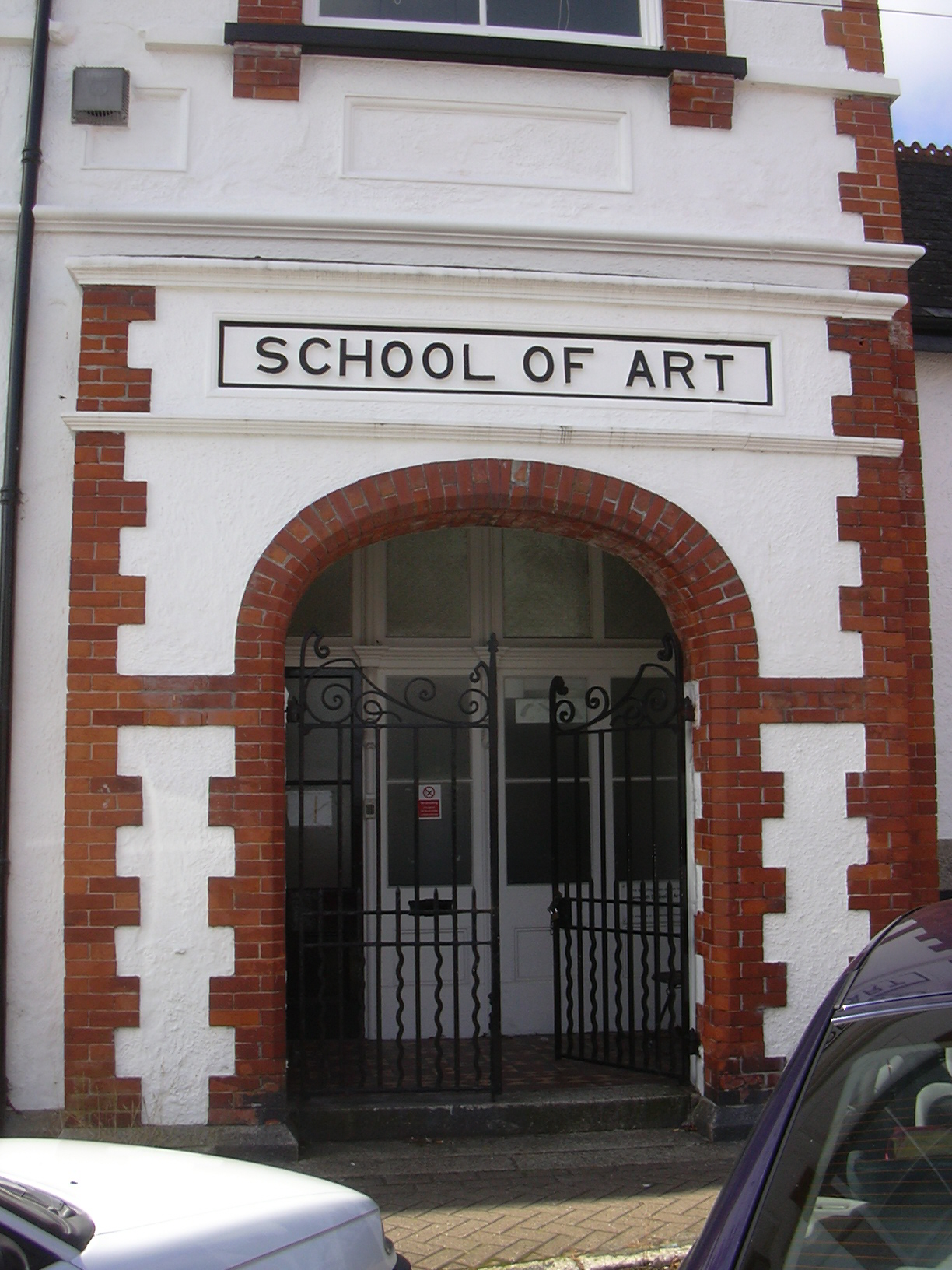
Falmouth School of Art - original building - Entrance.

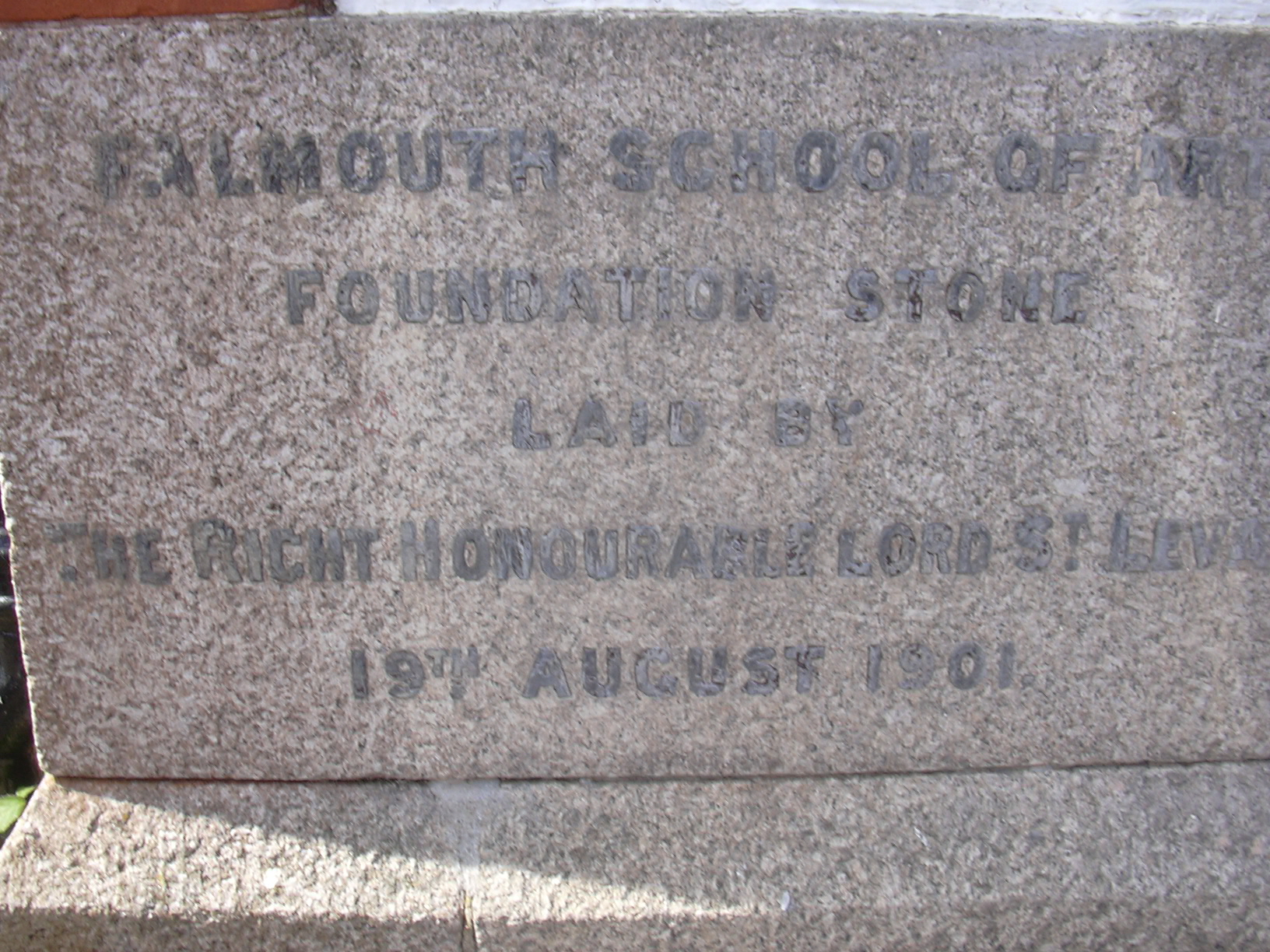
Falmouth School of Art - original building - Foundation stone 1901.

== Gallery: Wellington Terrace Primary School building ==
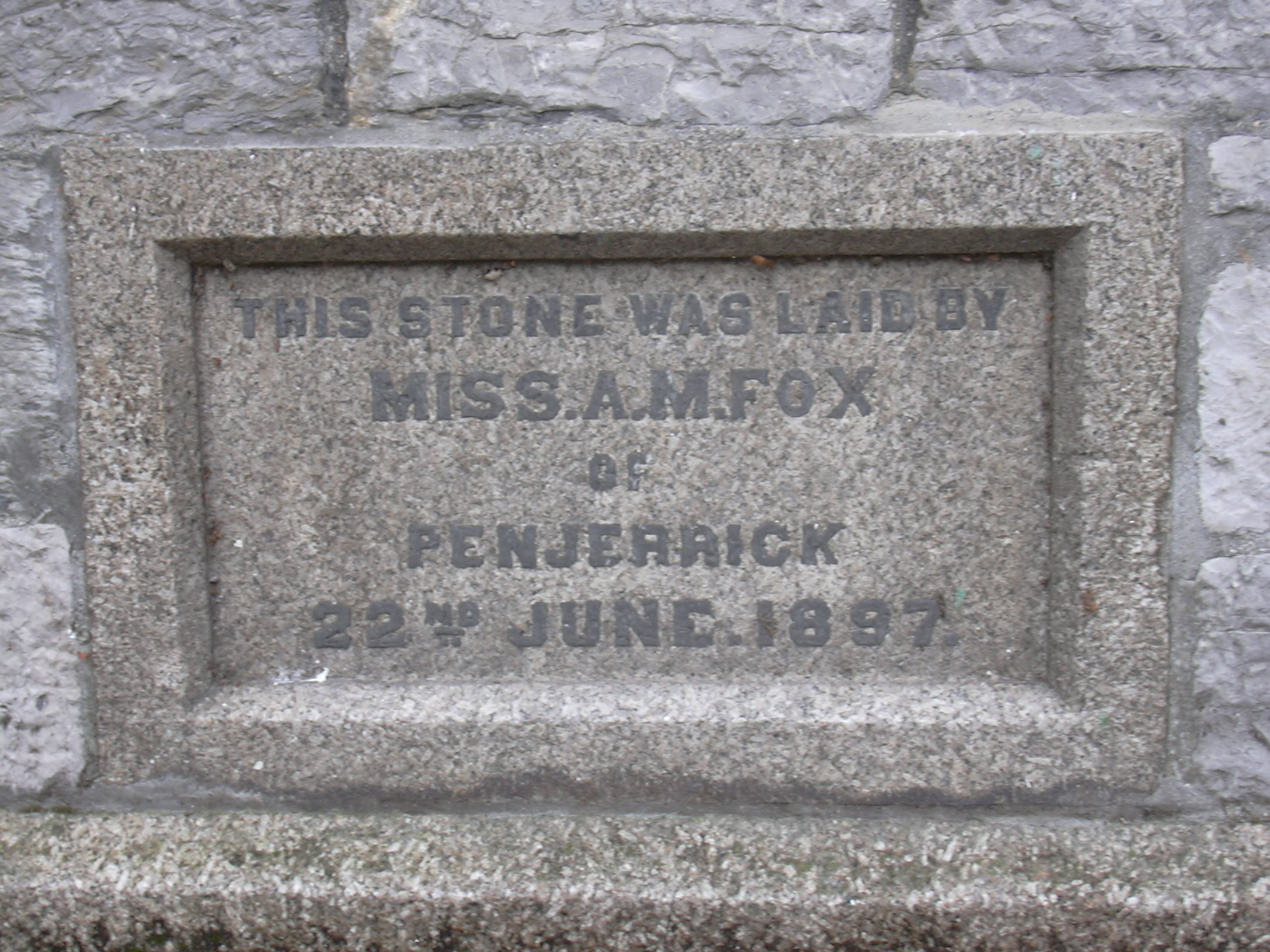
Foundation stone "laid by Miss A. M. Fox of Penjerrick 22 June 1897".

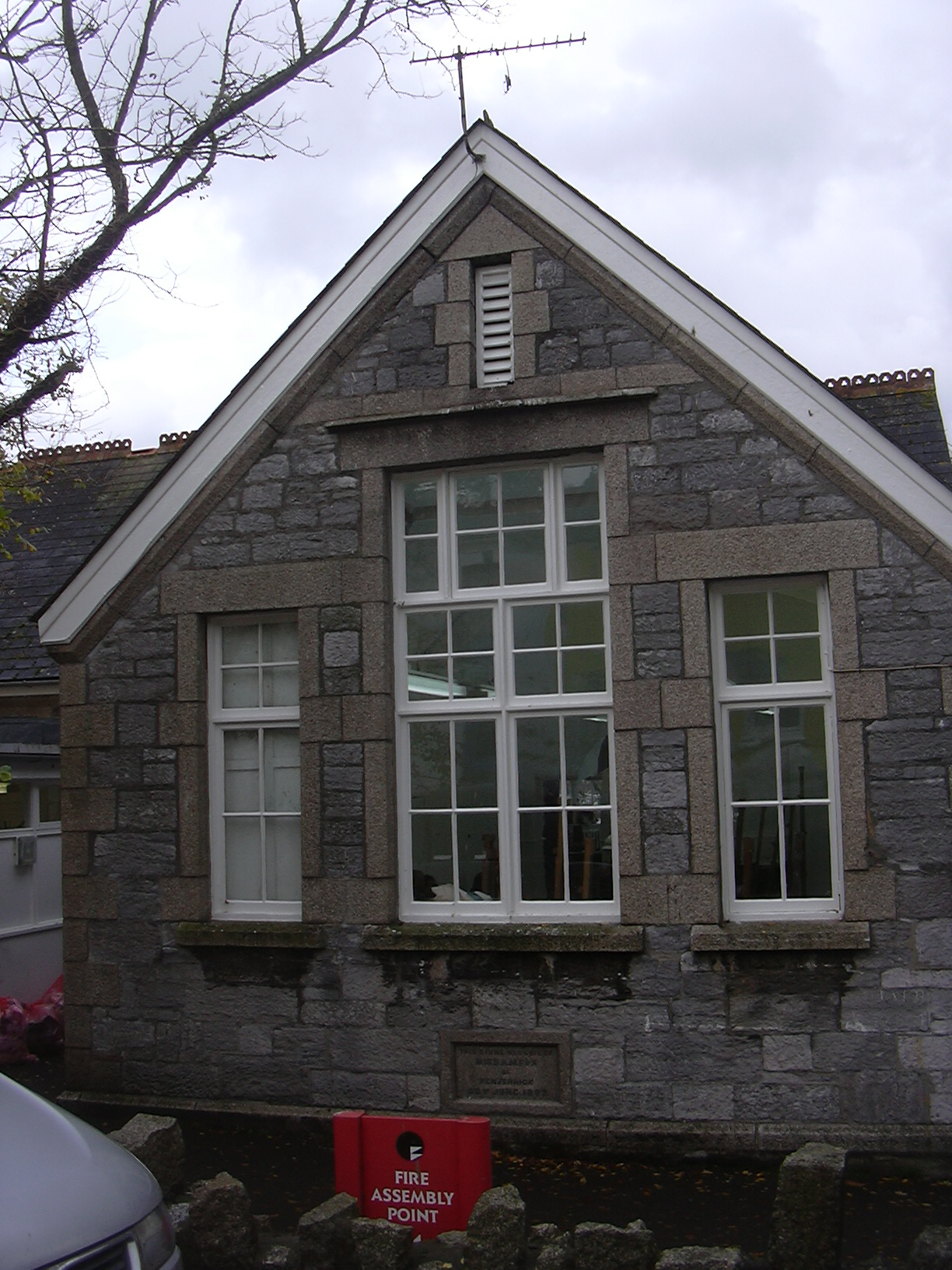
View of building, now owned by University College of Falmouth.

== Pets and personality ==
She kept a variety of exotic pets – including marmosets, parrots, love-birds, cockatiels, canaries and avadavats. Thomas Hodgkin notes that whilst her sister Caroline was prone to sarcasm, Anna Maria always had an optimistic and less critical attitude to other people.

== Travels ==
Robert Were Fox usually took his children on his journeys out of Cornwall. The family often attended the annual Quaker gathering in London, held in May, and met their relations and friends. Robert also took them the meetings of the British Association, held in towns around the United Kingdom and Ireland. In 1880, she visited Palestine In August, 1884, she visited Canada and the US, with her nephew, Howard Fox, to attend the British Association meeting in Montreal and the meeting of the BAAS with the American Association in Philadelphia, organised by Lord Rayleigh.

== Likenesses ==
The portrait of Anna Maria Fox by Henry Scott Tuke, reproduced in the 1897 Poly Annual Report, is currently on display at the Falmouth Gallery, in the Moor (28 June 2012). A photograph of Tuke painting Anna Maria is at the Tate Gallery. In Old Falmouth Miss Susan Gay reproduces a full-length photographic portrait "at Penjerrick Garden", opposite page 15.

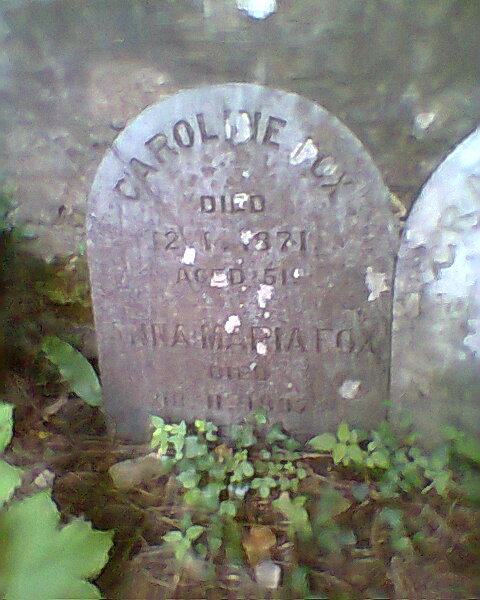
Gravestone of Caroline and Anna Maria Fox in Budock Quaker Burial Ground, Falmouth

== Sources and references ==
=== Sources ===
The Journals

- Fox, Caroline (1881) Memories of Old Friends: Caroline Fox of Penjerrick, Cornwall (edited by H. N. Pym, 1881; 2nd edition, 1882).
- Fox, Caroline (1972). The journals of Caroline Fox, 1835–1871: a selection, edited by Wendy Monk. London: Paul Elek. ISBN 0-236-15447-8.
- Fox, Robert Barclay (1979). Barclay Fox's journal, (edited by Raymond Brett). London: Bell and Hyman. ISBN 0-7135-1865-0. U.S. edition, Rowman & Littlefield (1979), Totowa, N.J. ISBN 0-8476-6187-3

Other Sources

- Gay, Susan E. (1903) Old Falmouth: the story of the town from the days of the Killigrews to the earliest part of the Nineteenth century, London, Headley Brothers.
- Harris, Wilson (1944). Caroline Fox. London: Constable..
- Hodgkin, Thomas (1898) "Anna Maria Fox", Friends Quarterly Examiner, Vol. CXXV, 1st month 1898. pp. 115–136.
- Royal Cornwall Polytechnic Society Annual Report for 1897, pp. v–ix Obituary of Anna Maria Fox. A photogravure of her full-face portrait by Henry Scott Tuke forms the frontispiece.
- Tod, Robert (1978). Caroline Fox, Quaker bluestocking: 1819–1871. York: William Sessions Limited. ISBN 0-900657-54-5.
- 'Dictionary of Quaker Biography': Huge typescript resource at the Library of the Religious Society of Friends, Euston, London UK, known as "DQB".
