= Thomasine, Lady Percival =

- Born: Thomasine Bonaventure c.1440
- Died: c.1513
- Spouses: Henry Galle; Thomas Barnaby; Sir John Percival

Thomasine, Lady Percival (born Thomasine Bonaventure; c. 1440 – c. 1513), was a Cornish businesswoman, benefactress and founder of a school in her home village of Week St Mary, North Cornwall. She was one of the first non-noble women to be a founder of a school.

== Life ==
She was married to three London citizen tailors after another. The third was Sir John Percival, Lord Mayor in 1498. She had no children with any of her husbands. As John Percival's widow Thomasine, Lady Percival, devoted her considerable wealth to supporting charitable works. She was active within the businesses of her three husbands, and appears to have continued being active in business as a widow, being wealthy and successful enough to loan money to the King.

The story is reported by Richard Carew in his Survey of Cornwall (1602), when writing of the parish of Week St Mary in North Cornwall. It is given fuller treatment in Davies Gilbert's Parochial History of Cornwall (1838). Both authorities state the young woman's name as Thomasine Bonaventure, though the surname might refer to her good fortune rather than her ancestors. A legacy in her will to a brother, 'John Bonaventer', suggests it was her name. Both emphasize her charm and intelligence. Thomasine was a native of Week St Mary, and is said to have paid for the repair of a bridge. There is no dispute that she founded a school and library there around 1510, which was much used by the people of Cornwall and to some extent Devon, until it was suppressed in the reign of Edward VI. A copy of her will, with which she endowed the school, was bound for a buyer overseas in 1972, when it was purchased for the British Library.

According to one account Thomasine's first husband had the name Thomas Bumsby and her second Henry Gall. William Galle, tailor, and Henry Bumpstede, mercer, described as bridge masters of London Bridge, in records, were also business partners until Bumpstede died in 1486.

On the Great Western Railway, locomotive no. 3354 (later no. 3342) of the 3300 class was named Bonaventura after Thomasine; it ran from 1900 to 1938.
