= Selina Wadge =

Executed criminal (1850–1878)

- Born: 1850; Cornwall
- Died: 15 August 1878 (aged 28); Bodmin Jail, Cornwall, United Kingdom
- Resting place: Bodmin Jail
- Occupation: Workhouse
- Children: 2
- Conviction: Murder of Henry Wadge
- Criminal charge: Murder
- Penalty: Death by hanging

Details
- Date: 21 June 1878
- Country: United Kingdom
- Location: Cornwall
- Date apprehended: 1878

Selina Wadge (1850 – 15 August 1878) was a Cornish woman who was convicted of the murder of one of her children. She was sentenced to death and executed by hanging at Bodmin Jail.

Long after her death, she was said to haunt the jail while her case has been cited by academics as throwing light on then prevailing social and official attitudes and practices.

== Crime ==
Selina Wadge was born in Cornwall around 1850. Due to poverty, she resided at the workhouse in Launceston. The building was constructed in 1837 under the provisions of the Poor Law Amendment Act 1834. In 1878, she remained unmarried and had two illegitimate children; six-year-old John and two-year-old Henry, known as Harry, who was disabled. She was said to have been courting a former soldier named James Westwood. She travelled to the nearby village of Altarnun to visit her mother with her children.

On 21 June 1878, she hitchhiked back to Launceston with William Holman, a local farmer, telling him that she was going to meet her boyfriend, Westwood. The following day, she told her sister and the workhouse master, Mr. Downing, that Harry had died and later that evening John told workhouse nurses what his mother had done. The following morning, Wadge was questioned by Downing and his wife, the matron, about what had happened. She said her boyfriend had drowned Harry in a well and had threatened to kill her and John.

Downing called the police who sent Superintendent Barrett of Launceston to investigate the disappearance; he found Harry's body sunken in a 13-foot deep well. As the well was covered, foul play was suspected though the body showed no signs of violence. Wadge then confessed to Mrs. Downey that she had committed the murder alone; Wadge was arrested, taken to Launceston police station, and charged with murder. There, she stated that Westwood had convinced her to drown her child after promising his hand in marriage.

== Trial ==
On 27 July 1878, Wadge was put on trial at Bodmin with Justice George Denman presiding. The workhouse staff gave evidence of her confession and the letters of Westwood were read out. Westwood insisted he had no negative feelings toward the children while Wadge was characterised by witnesses as a caring mother.

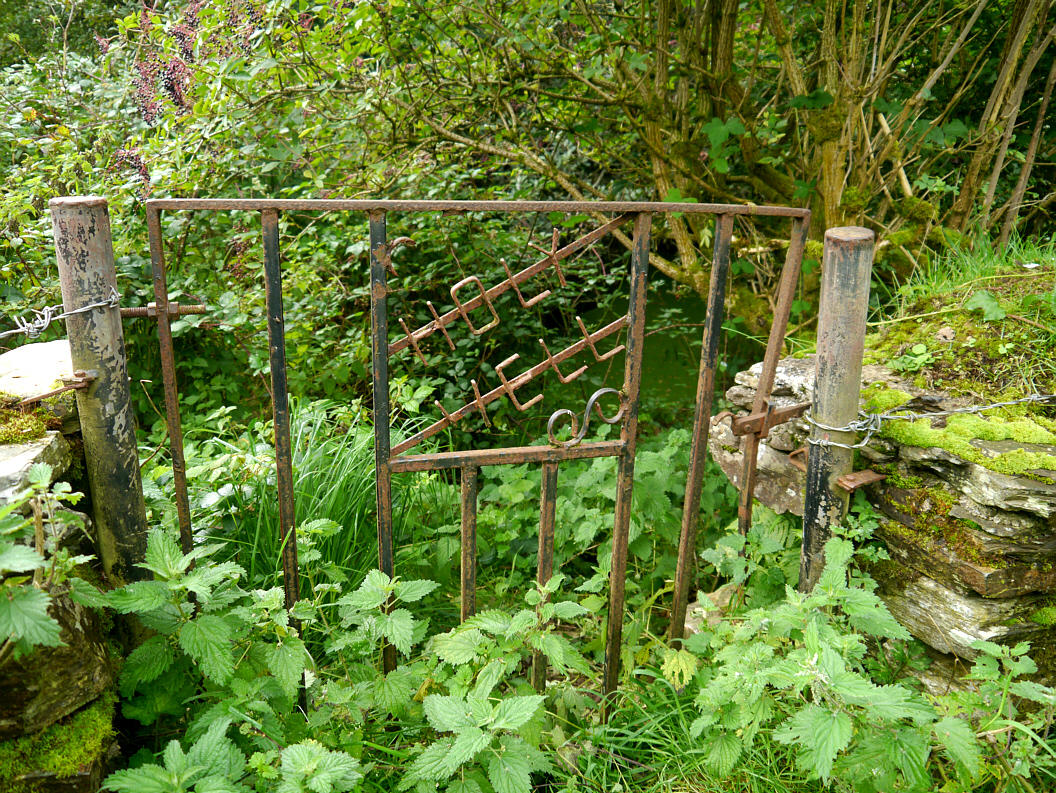
The gate to the holy well at Altarnun.

She pleaded not guilty and continued to blame Westwood. After 45 minutes consideration, the jury pronounced a guilty verdict but recommended that mercy be given due to the belief that the murder had not been premeditated. Justice Denman sentenced her to death, the only sentence available to him, for the murder of Henry.

== Execution ==
After sentencing, Wadge was taken back to Bodmin Jail where she received a letter from Westwood asking for forgiveness. The case papers were sent to Home Office officials who did not recommend a reprieve to the Home Secretary Sir Richard Assheton Cross.

I drowned the child. I put it in the water. Lord deliver me from this miserable world

— Selina Wadge, her last words before she was executed

Wadge was hanged by William Marwood at Bodmin Jail on 15 August 1878. The execution was carried out in private and the media were not allowed access. It was the first execution at Bodmin after the Capital Punishment Amendment Act 1868 abolished public executions. Wadge was one of four women hanged for the crime of infanticide between 1868 and 1899.

== Legacy ==
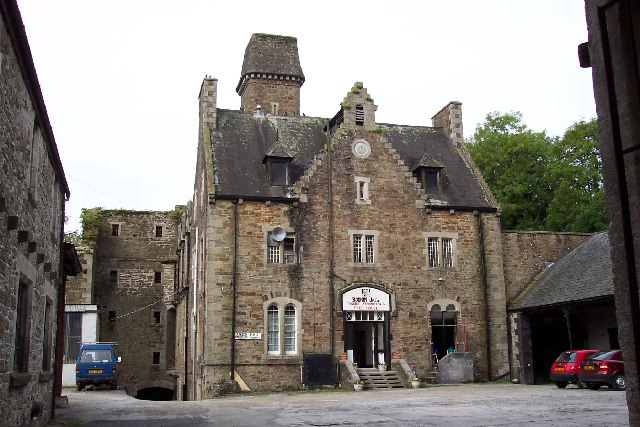
Bodmin Jail, where Selina Wadge was imprisoned and executed in 1878.

Wadge is one of the most infamous prisoners of Bodmin Jail. The historic prison is considered the most haunted building in Cornwall. It has also been described as one of the most haunted in Britain, featuring in the television programme Most Haunted. The ghost of Wadge has been said to haunt Bodmin Jail and is particularly affected by the presence of children and pregnant women. The ghost has been described as "a woman in a long dress". Sightings were reported on the prison's third and fourth floors.

The case has been studied due to the classism and sexism of the Victorian period. Particularly as a young mother from rural Cornwall, whether she had a fair trial has been questioned. According to feminist analysis, the verdict was affected by the reality of 19th-century motherhood.

The court papers are held by the The National Archives. In 2023, an exhibition held at Bodmin Jail included a love letter from her belongings.
