= Robert Were Fox the Younger =

British businessman and scientist (1789–1877)

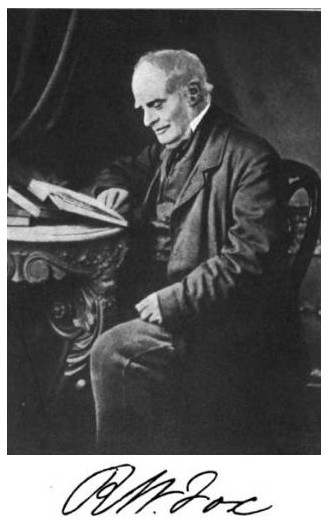
- Born: 26 April 1789; Falmouth, Cornwall, England
- Died: 25 July 1877 (aged 88)
- Known for: Geophysical measurements Magnetic dip compass
- Scientific career
- Fields: Mining, geology, geophysics

Robert Were Fox FRS (26 April 1789 – 25 July 1877) was a British geologist, natural philosopher and inventor. He is known mainly for his work on the temperature of the Earth and his construction of a compass to measure magnetic dip at sea.

== Life and family ==
Fox was born on 26 April 1789 at Falmouth, England, the eldest son of Robert Were Fox (1754–1818) (Note: Fox and his father (1754–1818) had the same name. The father also merited an entry in ODNB: Payton 2004) and his wife, Elizabeth Tregelles. He had nine siblings. The Fox family were members of the Religious Society of Friends (Quakers), and were descended from members who had long settled in Cornwall, although they were not related to George Fox who had introduced the community into the county.

In 1814, Fox the Younger married Maria Barclay (1785–1858), daughter of Robert and Rachel Barclay of Bury Hill, near Dorking, Surrey. Maria's sister, Lucy, married Fox's cousin, George Croker Fox (1784–1850).

Robert Were Fox the Younger and his wife had three children, Anna Maria (1816–1897), Barclay (1817–1855) and Caroline (1819–1871). Both Caroline and Barclay Fox's journals have been published.

Robert Were Fox the Younger died on 25 July 1877 and was buried at the Quaker Burial Ground at Budock. (Note: R. W. Fox was buried at the Quaker Burial Ground, Budock, along with his daughters, Anna Maria and Caroline, according to a Burial Plan at the Cornwall Record Office. However, no gravestones for them remain: the Burial Ground was vandalised in the 1970s and many gravestones broken.)

== Business interests ==
Fox was involved in many aspects of his family's businesses, along with several of his brothers. He also served as Honorary Consul of the USA in Falmouth from 1819 to 1854.

Fox and Joel Lean were granted a patent in 1812 for their modifications of steam engines. The grant of patent was described thus: Specification of the Patent granted to Robert Were Fox and Joel Lean, of Budock, near Falmouth; for certain Improvements on Steam Engines, and the Apparatus needful or expedient to be used with the same.

== Horticultural interests ==
Fox's gardens at Rosehill and Penjerrick, near Falmouth, became noted for the number of exotic plants which he and his son, Barclay, had naturalised. Both are now both open to the public.

== Scientific work ==
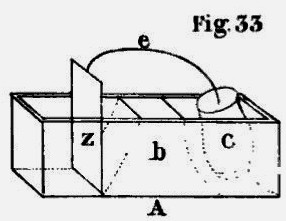
Experimental apparatus of Fox

Fox's work was in what today would be referred to as geophysics. He was distinguished for his researches on the internal temperature of the Earth, contributing papers to the Royal Geological Society of Cornwall, and being the first to prove that temperature definitely increases with depth (the geothermal gradient), his observations being conducted in Cornish mines from 1815 for a period of forty years. In 1829 he began a set of experiments on the artificial production of miniature metalliferous veins by means of the long-continued influence of electric currents, and his main results were published in 1836.

In 1834 Fox constructed an improved form of deflector dipping needle compass, or dip circle, for polar navigation. (Note: The dip of a needle is defined as: "a certain property which all needles possess when rubbed with a lodestone of inclining the north end below the level of the horizon: this property found to increase in going northward".) One was used by Sir James Clark Ross on his Antarctic expedition and used to discover the position of the South magnetic pole.

He was a key person in the development of the Royal Cornwall Polytechnic Society and its promotion of scientific research and training. He was an active member of the British Association for the Advancement of Science. On 2 June 1838 Fox was elected a member of the newly-formed London Electrical Society

Robert Were Fox, his cousin, George Croker Fox (1784–1850) and brother, Alfred Fox, assembled excellent collections of minerals, which are now in the British Museum, given by Arthur Russell.

== Honours and activities ==
- Fellow of the Royal Society (Elected 9 September 1848)

The Society owns a collection of letters addressed to Fox and his family.

== Selected writings ==
The following is a very incomplete list of Fox's writings. According to the Dictionary of National Biography (1889), Fox authored 52 scientific papers.

- Fox, Robert W. (1822). "On the Temperature of Mines". Transactions of the Royal Geological Society of Cornwall. 2: 14–28.
- Fox, Robert W. (1827). "Some Further Observations on the Temperature of Mines". Transactions of the Royal Geological Society of Cornwall. 3: 313–328.
- Fox, Robert Were (January 1828). "Experiments Illustrative of the Influence of Voltaic Electricity on Copper Pyrites". The Annals of Electricity, Magnetism, and Chemistry. 3: 133–134.
- Fox, Robert Were (1828). "Some Observations of Metalliferous Veins, and their Electro-magnetic Properties". Transactions of the Royal Geological Society of Cornwall. 3: 21–28.
- Fox, Robert Were (1830). "On the Electro-Magnetic Properties of Metalliferous Veins in the Mines of Cornwall". Philosophical Transactions of the Royal Society. 120: 399–414. doi:10.1098/rstl.1830.0027.
- Fox, Robert Were (1831). "On the Variable Intensity of Terrestrial Magnetism, and the Influence of the Aurora Borealis upon It". Philosophical Transactions of the Royal Society. 121: 199–207. doi:10.1098/rstl.1831.0012.
- Fox, Robert Were (1830–1837). "On Certain Irregularities in the Magnetic Needle, Produced by Partial Warmth, and the Relations Which Appear to Subsist between Terrestrial Magnetism and the Geological Structure and Thermo-Electrical Currents of the Earth". Abstracts of the Papers Printed in the Philosophical Transactions of the Royal Society of London. 3: 123–125. doi:10.1098/rspl.1830.0066.
- Fox, Robert Were (1840). "Some Remarks on Electric Currents in Metalliferous Veins". The Edinburgh New Philosophical Journal. 28: 267–270.
- Fox, Robert Were (1846). "On Certain Pseudo-Morphous Crystals of Quartz". The Edinburgh New Philosophical Journal. 40: 115–120.
- Fox, Robert Were (1847). "Some Remarks on the High Temperatures in the United Mines". The Edinburgh New Philosophical Journal. 43: 99–102.
- Fox, Robert W. (1855). "On Sand-worn Granite near the Land's-End". Quarterly Journal of the Geological Society of London. 11 (1–2): 549–550. Bibcode:1855QJGS...11..549F. doi:10.1144/GSL.JGS.1855.011.01-02.62. S2CID 128409956.
- Fox, Robert W. (1858). "Report on the Temperature of Some Deep Mines in Cornwall". Report of the Twenty-Seventh Meeting of the British Association for the Advancement of Science. 11: 96–101.
- A Catalogue of the Works of Robert Were Fox, F.R.S., with a Sketch of his Life (1878), by J. H. Collins, Truro, Lake & Lake.
