= 1862 in music =

== Events ==
- March 17 – Anton Rubinstein is named first director of the Saint Petersburg Conservatory in Russia, which opens in September. Tchaikovsky is in the first incoming class.
- March 24 – Fromental Halévy's funeral, in Paris, is attended by an estimated 15,000 people.
- April 24 – A letter from Giuseppe Verdi is published in The Times of London complaining about the rejection of a work commissioned from him for the Great Exhibition.
- May 17 – Teatro Comunale Florence inaugurated as an open-air amphitheatre, the Politeama Fiorentino Vittorio Emanuele, with a production of Donizetti's Lucia di Lammermoor.
- May 21 – Edvard Grieg gives his first concert in his home town of Bergen, Norway.
- August 4 – Louis-Albert Bourgault-Ducoudray wins the Prix de Rome in the Musical Composition category. Jules Massenet is one of the runners-up.
- August 9 – The première of Hector Berlioz's opera Béatrice et Bénédict inaugurates the new Theater Baden-Baden.
- November 2 – The Ride of the Valkyries and the overture to Die Meistersinger von Nürnberg by Richard Wagner are publicly performed in Leipzig, conducted by the composer.
- November 10 (November 22 N.S.) – Giuseppe Verdi's opera La forza del destino is first performed, in the Bolshoi Kamenny Theatre of Saint Petersburg, Russia.
- November 18 – Antonín Dvořák is a member of the orchestra at the opening of the Provisional Theater in Prague.
- date unknown
  - Johannes Brahms and Johann Strauss II meet, at Baden-Baden.
  - Stephen Heller and Charles Hallé perform Mozart's E-flat concerto for two pianos at The Crystal Palace in London.
  - Ludwig von Köchel publishes Chonologisch-thematisches Verzeichnis sämtlicher Tonwerke Wolfgang Amadé Mozarts (Catalogue of Mozart's Works or "The Köchel Catalog").

== Published popular music ==
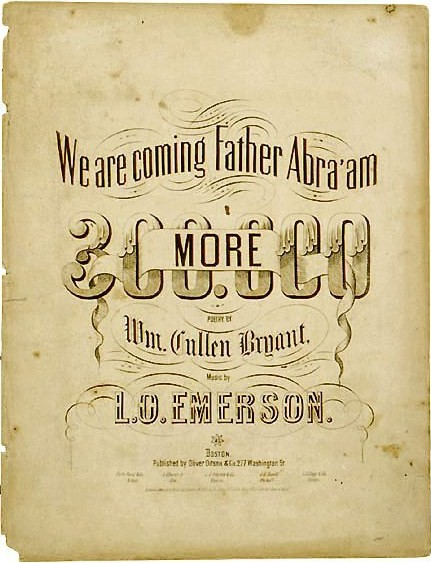
Sheet music cover

- "Angels We Have Heard on High" – James Chadwick (paraphrase of traditional French lyrics) and Edward Shippen Barnes (arrangement of traditional French tune)
- "Battle Cry of Freedom" – George Frederick Root
- "The Battle Hymn of the Republic" – Julia Ward Howe, published in Atlantic Monthly (February 1).
- "Here's Your Mule" – C. D. Benson
- "Kingdom Coming" – Henry C. Work
- "The Merry, Merry Month of May" – Stephen Foster
- "We Are Coming, Father Abra'am, 300,000 More" – poem by James S. Gibbons, set to music by eight different composers, including Stephen Foster.
- "Blaydon Races" – traditional folk tune, 1862 lyrics by George Ridley
- Christ Is Risen! Christ Is Risen! – Archer Thompson Gurney
- Tyneside Songs – Thomas Allan (publisher)

== Classical music ==
- Alexander Borodin – Piano Quintet in C minor
- Johannes Brahms - First two movements of the Cello Sonata No. 1
- Emanuel Chabrier – Souvenirs de Brunehaut
- Felix Draeseke – Fantasiestücke in Walzerform, opus 3: Nr. 1 in B; Nr. 2 in A-flat
- Louis Moreau Gottschalk
  - Union, Op. 48
  - Home Sweet Home, Op.51
  - Le Papillon
- Asger Hamerik – Quintet
- Ferdinand Laub – Concert-Polonaise, Op. 8
- Karol Józef Lipiński – 2 Impromptus, Op.34 (published posthumously)
- Franz Liszt
  - Phantasiestück über Motive aus 'Rienzi', S. 439
  - Berceuse
- Henry Charles Litolff – Scherzo, Op. 115
- Giacomo Meyerbeer – Fest-Ouvertüre im Marschstyl
- Cesare Pugni – The Pharaoh's Daughter, ballet
- Joachim Raff – Piano Quintet, Op. 107 in A minor
- Napoleon Henri Reber – Piano Trio No. 4 'Sérénade', Op. 25
- Camille Saint-Saëns – Mazurka No. 1 for piano in G minor, Op. 21
- Henri Vieuxtemps – Violin Concerto No. 5, Op. 37
- Giuseppe Verdi - Hymn of the Nations
- Henri Wieniawski
  - Etudes-Caprices, Op. 18
  - Fantaisie orientale, Op. 24

== Opera ==
- Julius Benedict – The Lily of Killarney
- Hector Berlioz – Béatrice et Bénédict
- Frederic Clay – Court and Cottage (libretto by Tom Taylor)
- Charles Gounod – La reine de Saba
- Franz von Suppé – Die Kartenschlägerin
- Giuseppe Verdi – La forza del destino

== Births ==
- January 29 – Frederick Delius, composer (d. 1934)
- January 30 – Walter Damrosch, conductor (d. 1950)
- February 13 – Karel Weis, composer (d. 1944)
- February 17 – Edward German, composer (d. 1936)
- March 19 – Jef Denyn, carillon player (d. 1941)
- March 22 – William H. Rieger, tenor (d. 1930)
- March 21 – Elmer Samuel Hosmer, composer (d. 1945)
- April 5 – Louis Ganne, conductor (died 1923)
- May 2 – Maurice Emmanuel, composer (d. 1938)
- June 3 – Joseph Humfrey Anger, composer (died 1913)
- June 27 – May Irwin, actress and singer (d. 1938)
- August 10 – Ernest Richard Kroeger, composer (died 1934)
- August 11 – Carrie Jacobs-Bond, US songwriter (d. 1946)
- August 22 – Claude Debussy, composer (d. 1918)
- August 29 – Maurice Maeterlinck, lyricist (died 1949)
- September 25 – Léon Boëllmann, composer and organist (d. 1897)
- October 10 – Arthur De Greef, composer and pianist (d. 1940)
- October 15 – Conrad Ansorge, composer (died 1930)
- November 1 – Johan Wagenaar, organist and composer (d. 1941)
- December 9 – Karel Kovařovic, composer (died 1920)
- December 18 – Moriz Rosenthal, pianist (d. 1946)
- December 23 – Hans Wessely, composer (died 1926)
- date unknown – Marcelle Lender, French singer-dancer and entertainer (d. 1926)

== Deaths ==
- February 5 – Ignaz Franz Castelli, dramatist and songwriter (b. 1780)
- February 7 – František Škroup, composer (b. 1801)
- February 16 – Leopold Schefer, composer and poet (b. 1784)
- March 17 – Fromental Halévy, composer (b. 1799)
- April 7 – Sydney Nelson, composer and arranger (born 1800)
- May 21 – Edwin Pearce Christy, founder of Christy's Minstrels (b. 1815) (suicide)
- May 23 – Friedrich Ruthardt, oboist and composer (b. 1800)
- May 25 – Johann Nestroy, singer and actor (b. 1801)
- July 2 – Charles Mayer, pianist and composer (b. 1799)
- August 31 – Ignaz Assmayer, composer (b. 1790)
- November 1 – Eleonora Zrza, Danish opera soprano (b. 1797)
- December 2 – Marius Gueit, French organist, cellist and composer (b. 1808)
- December 24 – Joseph Funk, composer and music teacher (b. 1778)
- date unknown
  - Jon Eriksson Helland, Hardanger fiddle maker (b. 1790)
  - Luigi Piccioli, singer and music teacher (b. 1812)
  - Geltrude Righetti, operatic contralto (b. 1793)
