= General Worsley =

General Worsley may refer to:

- Charles Worsley (1622–1656), English Army major general
- Henry Worsley (East India Company officer) (1768–1841), British Army major general
- Richard Worsley (1923–2013), British Army general
