= Jack Andrew =

British rugby player

- Born: Cornwall, England
- Height: 1.93 m (6 ft 4 in)
- Weight: 127 kg (20 st 0 lb)
- School: The Roseland Community College
- Notable relative: Paul Andrew

Rugby union career
- Position: Prop
- Current team: Cornish Pirates
Senior career
Years	Team	Apps	(Points)
2010-2012	Exeter Chiefs		
2012-2013	Plymouth Albion		
2013-	Cornish Pirates		

Jack Andrew is a British rugby union player for Cornish Pirates. He went to Exeter Chiefs from their academy in the summer of 2010. He joined the pirates in the summer 2013 His position of choice is Prop. Jack attended The Roseland Community College in Tregony, Cornwall until 2007 where he then joined Truro College.
