= 1831 Coronation Honours =

Appointments by King William IV to various orders and honours

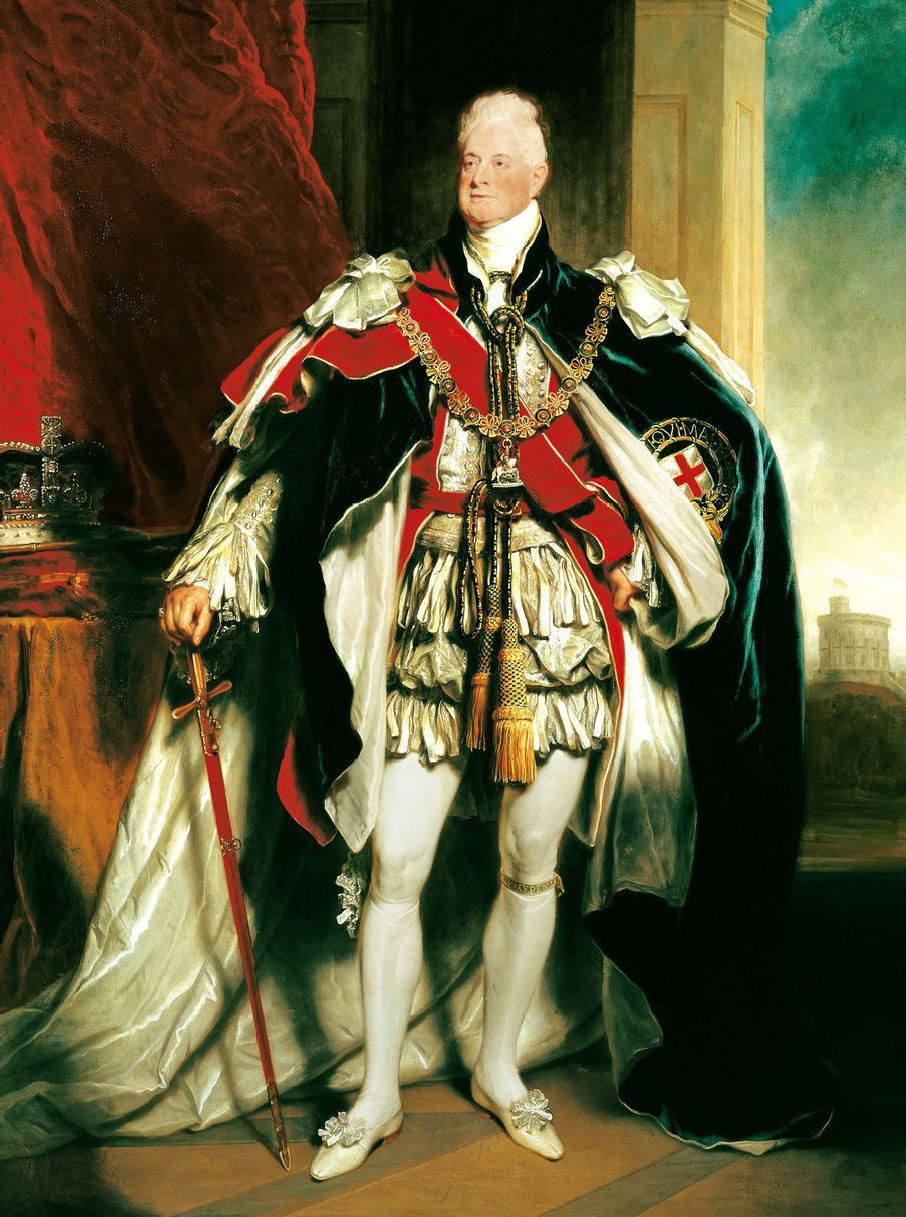
King William IV, 1833

The 1831 Coronation Honours were appointments by King William IV to various orders and honours on the occasion of his coronation on 8 September 1831. The honours were published in The London Gazette on 16 September and 27 September 1831.

The recipients of honours are displayed here as they were styled before their new honour, and arranged by honour, with classes (Knight, Knight Commander, etc.) and then divisions as appropriate.

== United Kingdom and British Empire ==
=== Baronet ===
- Lieutenant-General John Slade
- Lieutenant-General Sir William Anson KCB of Birchhall, in the county palatine of Lancaster
- Lieutenant-General Kenneth Mackenzie, of Glenbervie, in the county of Kincardine
- Vice-Admiral Sir Robert Waller Otway KCB of Brighthelmstone, in the county of Sussex
- Major-General Sir Archibald Campbell GCB and Lieutenant-Governor of New Brunswick
- Augustus John Foster, of Stone House, in the county of Louth, His Majesty's Envoy Extraordinary and Minister Plenipotentiary to the King of Sardinia
- Sir James McGrigor of Campden Hill, in the county of Middlesex, Director-General of the Army Medical Department
- Robert Way Harty, of Prospect House, Roebuck, in the county of Dublin Lord Mayor of Dublin
- Colonel John Thomas Jones, of Cranmer Hall, in the county of Norfolk
- Robert Greenhill-Russell, of Checquers Court, in the county of Buckingham
- William Chaytor, of Croft, in the county of York, and of Witton Castle, in the county of Durham
- William Wrixon-Becher, of Ballygiblin, in the county of Cork
- Joseph Birch, of the Hazles, in the county palatine of Lancaster
- Robert Campbell, of Carrick Buoy, in the county of Donegal
- Wilfrid Lawson, of Brayton House, in the county of Cumberland
- John Nugent Humble, of Cloncoskoran, in the county of Waterford
- James Martin Lloyd, of Lancing, in the county of Sussex
- James Gibson-Craig, of Riccaiton, in the county of Mid-Lothian
- Joseph Barrington, of the city of Limerick
- Theodore Henry Lavington Broadhead, of Burton, or Monk-Bretton, in the county of York
- John Colman Rashleigh, of Prideaux, in the county of Cornwall
- Duncan Campbell, of Barcaldine, in the county of Argyll
- Percy Fitzgerald Nugent, of Donore, in the county of Westmeath
- John James Garbett Walsham, of Knill Court, in the county of Hereford
- William Heygate, of Southend, in the county of Essex, one of the Aldermen of the city of London
- Thomas McKenny, one of the Aldermen of the city of Dublin
- Henry Meux, of Theobald's Park, in the county of Hertford
- Charles Mansfield Clarke of Dunham Lodge, in the county of Norfolk, one of the Physicians in Ordinary to Her Majesty

=== Knight Bachelor ===
- George Magrath and Surgeon in the Royal Navy
- Lieutenant-Colonel Frederic Smith, Commanding Engineer of the London District, Knight of the Royal Hanoverian Guelphic Order
- Lieutenant-Colonel Alexander Anderson CB Knight of the Royal Portuguese Military Order of the Tower and Sword
- Thomas Brancker, Mayor of Liverpool
- Robert Gill, Lieutenant of His Majesty's Guard of Yeomen of the Guard
- Henry Cipriani, Senior Exon of His Majesty's Guard of Yeomen of the Guard
- Henry Bromley Hinrich, Lieutenant of His Majesty's Honourable Band of Gentlemen Pensioners
- Richard Burton, Senior Member of His Majesty's Honourable of Gentlemen Pensioners
- Colonel Michael McCreagh CB of the 13th Light Infantry Regiment Knight Commander of the Royal Portuguese Military Order of the Tower and Sword, and Knight Commander of the Royal Guelphic Order

=== The Most Honourable Order of the Bath ===
==== Knight Commander of the Order of the Bath (KCB) ====
===== Military Division =====
East India Company

- Major-General Alexander Knox, of the Bengal Infantry
- Major-General John W. Adams CB of the Bengal Infantry
- Major-General Henry Worsley CB of the Bengal Infantry
- Major-General Hopetoun S. Scott CB of the Madras Infantry
- Major-General Robert Scot CB of the Madras Infantry
- Major-General Andrew McDowall CB of the Madras Infantry

==== Companion of the Order of the Bath (CB) ====
===== Military Division =====
Royal Navy

- Captain Richard Curry
- Captain the Honourable Frederick Paul Irby
- Captain Daniel Woodriff
- Captain James Sanders
- Captain the Honourable George Elliot
- Captain Hugh Pigot
- Captain Salusbury Pryce Humphreys
- Captain John Tower
- Captain William Hennah
- Captain William Pryce Cumby
- Captain the Honourable Josceline Percy
- Captain Andrew King

Army

- Colonel Richard Payne, of Hompesch's Rifles
- Colonel Charles Nicol, 66th Foot
- Colonel Henry King, 82nd Foot
- Colonel Frederick Rennell Thackeray, Royal Engineers
- Colonel John Boscawen Savage, Royal Marines
- Colonel John Francis Birch, Royal Engineers
- Colonel Henry Phillott, Royal Artillery
- Colonel Robert McCleverty, Royal Marines
- Colonel William Howe Knight Erskine, Bradshaw's Levy
- Colonel the Honourable Lincoln Stanhope, Unattached
- Colonel John Grey, 5th Foot
- Colonel Sir Henry Watson Kt Portuguese Service
- Colonel Charles Ashe à Court, 1st Greek Light Infantry
- Colonel Charles William Pasley, Royal Engineers
- Colonel John Gillies, 40th Foot
- Colonel Henry Charles Edward Vernon Graham, Unattached
- Colonel Sir Robert John Harvey, Portuguese Service
- Colonel Robert Waller, Assistant Quartermaster-General
- Colonel Alexander Thomson, 98th Foot
- Colonel John Duffy, Unattached
- Colonel Jacob Tonson, 37th Foot
- Colonel William Alexander Gordon, 95th Foot
- Colonel Lord George William Russell, Unattached
- Colonel James Fergusson, 52nd Foot
- Colonel Andrew Creagh, 81st Foot
- Colonel Robert Pym, Royal Artillery
- Colonel Archibald Campbell, 46th Foot
- Lieutenant-Colonel Richard Gubbins, 14th Foot
- Lieutenant-Colonel Thomas Hunter Blair, Unattached
- Lieutenant-Colonel Robert Lisle, 19th Dragoons
- Lieutenant-Colonel William G. Power, Royal Artillery
- Lieutenant-Colonel William Balvaird, Unattached
- Lieutenant-Colonel John Macdonald, 92nd Foot
- Lieutenant-Colonel Edward Fanshawe, Royal Engineers
- Lieutenant-Colonel William Cardon Seton, 88th Foot
- Lieutenant-Colonel Elias Lawrence, Royal Marines
- Lieutenant-Colonel William Cuthbert Elphinstone-Holloway, Royal Engineers
- Lieutenant-Colonel Charles Stuart Campbell, 1st Foot
- Lieutenant-Colonel George Turner, Royal Artillery
- Lieutenant-Colonel Thomas Alston Brandreth, Royal Artillery
- Lieutenant-Colonel Patrick Campbell, 52nd Foot
- Lieutenant-Colonel James Bogle, Unattached
- Lieutenant-Colonel John Michell, Royal Artillery
- Lieutenant-Colonel Edward Charles Whinyates, Royal Artillery
- Major Sir John Scott Lillie Kt 31st Foot
- Major Thomas Adams Parke, Royal Marines
- Major Henry Ross Gore, 89th Foot

East India Company

- Colonel John Rose, of the Bengal Infantry
- Colonel Gervase Pennington, of the Bengal Artillery
- Colonel James D. Greenhill, of the Madras Infantry
- Colonel John Doveton, of the Madras Cavalry
- Colonel Fortunatus Hagley Pierce, of the Bombay Artillery
- Colonel Robert Pitman, of the Bengal Infantry
- Colonel Hastings M. Kelly, of the Madras Infantry
- Colonel John Mayne, of the Bombay Infantry
- Colonel William Conrad Faithfull, of the Bengal Infantry
- Lieutenant-Colonel Francis W. Wilson, of the Madras Infantry
- Lieutenant-Colonel Alexander Lindsay, of the Bengal Artillery
- Lieutenant-Colonel Henry T. Roberts, of the Bengal Cavalry
- Lieutenant-Colonel James Caulfield, of the Bengal Cavalry
- Lieutenant-Colonel Richard Tickell, of the Bengal Engineers
- Lieutenant-Colonel Charles Fitzgerald, of the Bengal Cavalry
- Lieutenant-Colonel Samuel Hughes, of the Bombay Infantry
- Lieutenant-Colonel Robert Smith, of the Bengal Engineers
- Major Alexander Manson, of the Bombay Artillery
- Major James Nesbitt Jackson, of the Bengal Infantry
- Major Archibald Irvine, of the Bengal Engineers
