= Édouard Du Puy =

Swedish opera singer(1770-1822)

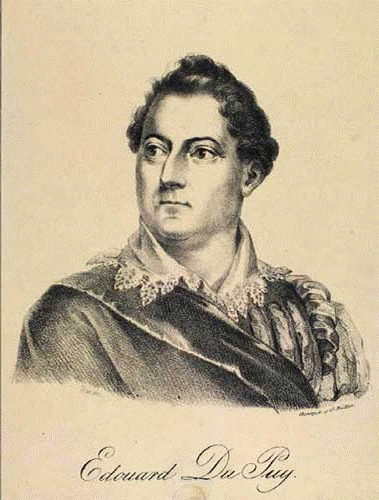
Édouard Du Puy as an older man

Jean Baptiste Édouard Louis Camille Du Puy (1770 – 3 April 1822) was a Principality of Neuchâtel-born singer, composer, director, and violinist. He lived and worked in Copenhagen and Stockholm from 1793 until his death in 1822.

== Early years ==
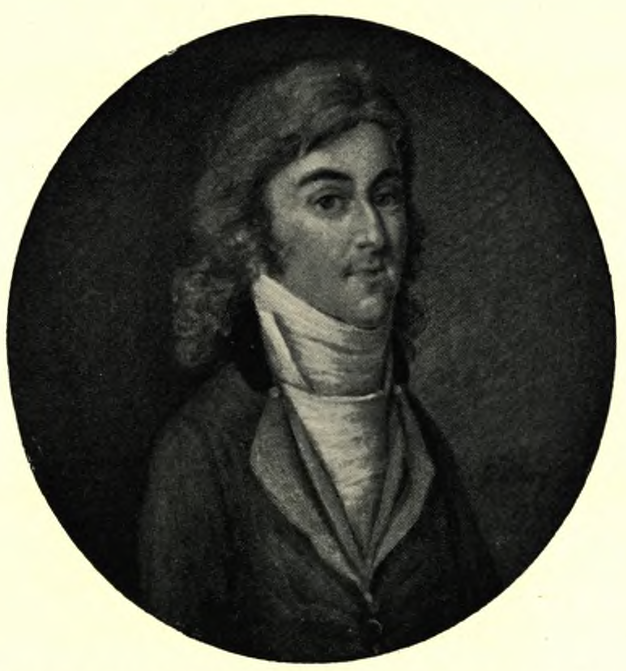
Édouard Du Puy as a young man

Édouard Du Puy was born in Corcelles-Cormondrèche, Principality of Neuchâtel, around the year 1770, although sources differ on the exact year. From the age of four, he was raised by his uncle, a city musician in Geneva, Republic of Geneva. Edouard later took the last name of this uncle. Seeing that his nephew had talent, the uncle made sure that Edouard received a musicial education.

In 1786, Du Puy was sent to Paris, where he was taught to play the piano by Jan Ladislav Dussek, and the violin by François Chabran.

In 1789, he was appointed concertmaster at the court of Heinrich of Prussia in Rheinsberg, replacing J. A. P. Schulz, who was called to Denmark as a choir director at the Royal Danish Orchestra (Danish: Det Kongelige Kapel). Du Puy worked in Rheinsberg for four years while studying harmonies under Carl Friedrich Christian Fasch.

== Stockholm and Copenhagen ==
Still in his early twenties, in 1793 Du Puy traveled throughout the Holy Roman Empire, Poland and Sweden as a violinist. While in Stockholm, he was appointed to the royal chapel, and later also as an opera singer at the Royal Swedish Opera. During this period, he also had an affair with Sophie Hagman In 1799, he fell out of favor with king Gustav IV Adolf of Sweden by praising Napoleon. Du Puy was banished from Sweden, and traveled to Copenhagen.

In the beginning, Du Puy made his living by tutoring in music, and gave a concert at the Royal Danish Theatre on 29 March 1800, playing among other things a concerto for violin that he himself had composed. After this, he was quickly made concertmaster at the royal chapel, and in 1802, opera singer. Du Puy was a very successful opera singer, e.g. starring as Don Giovanni in Mozart's opera. Meanwhile, he still performed elsewhere both as a singer, violinist and director. His compositions were popular, especially the singspiel Youth and Folly, and a number of songs written for various plays.

Among his other activities, Du Puy was one of the directors of the most esteemed social clubs in Copenhagen at the time called The Harmony (Danish: Harmonien). In 1801, he joined the voluntary royal guard (Danish: Livjægerkorpset), and was made lieutenant in 1807 during the Battle of Copenhagen against the British during the Napoleonic Wars. As lieutenant, Du Puy could no longer perform on stage, but continued as concertmaster, violinist and giving singing lessons.

== Banishment and return to Sweden ==
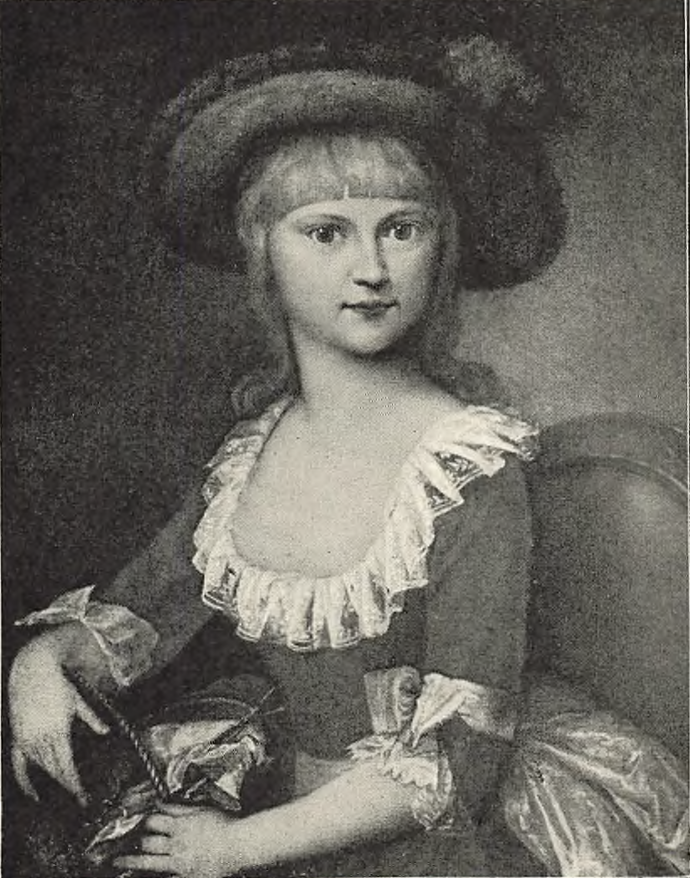
Anna Louise Frederikke Du Puy, née Müller.

Du Puy had fathered a child during his time in Rheinsberg, but when he came to Copenhagen, he married Anna Louise Frederikke Müller in 1803, and had several affairs. He allegedly also had an affair with Princess Charlotte Frederica of Mecklenburg-Schwerin (Ludwigslust, 4 December 1784 – Rome, 13 July 1840). She was married to Crown Prince Christian VIII, and mother of King Frederick VII of Denmark. Prince Christian divorced his wife and sent her into internal exile in Horsens, while Du Puy was banished from Denmark.

Although Du Puy applied for amnesty, it was of no use, and he left his family and traveled to Stockholm, where king Gustav IV Adolf had been deposed by a coup. In 1812, Du Puy was reinstated at the opera both as actor and Kapellmeister. Among other roles, he played Figaro in The Marriage of Figaro by Mozart. By 1795, Du Puy was a member of the Royal Swedish Academy of Music, and became titular professor in 1814.

== Death and legacy ==
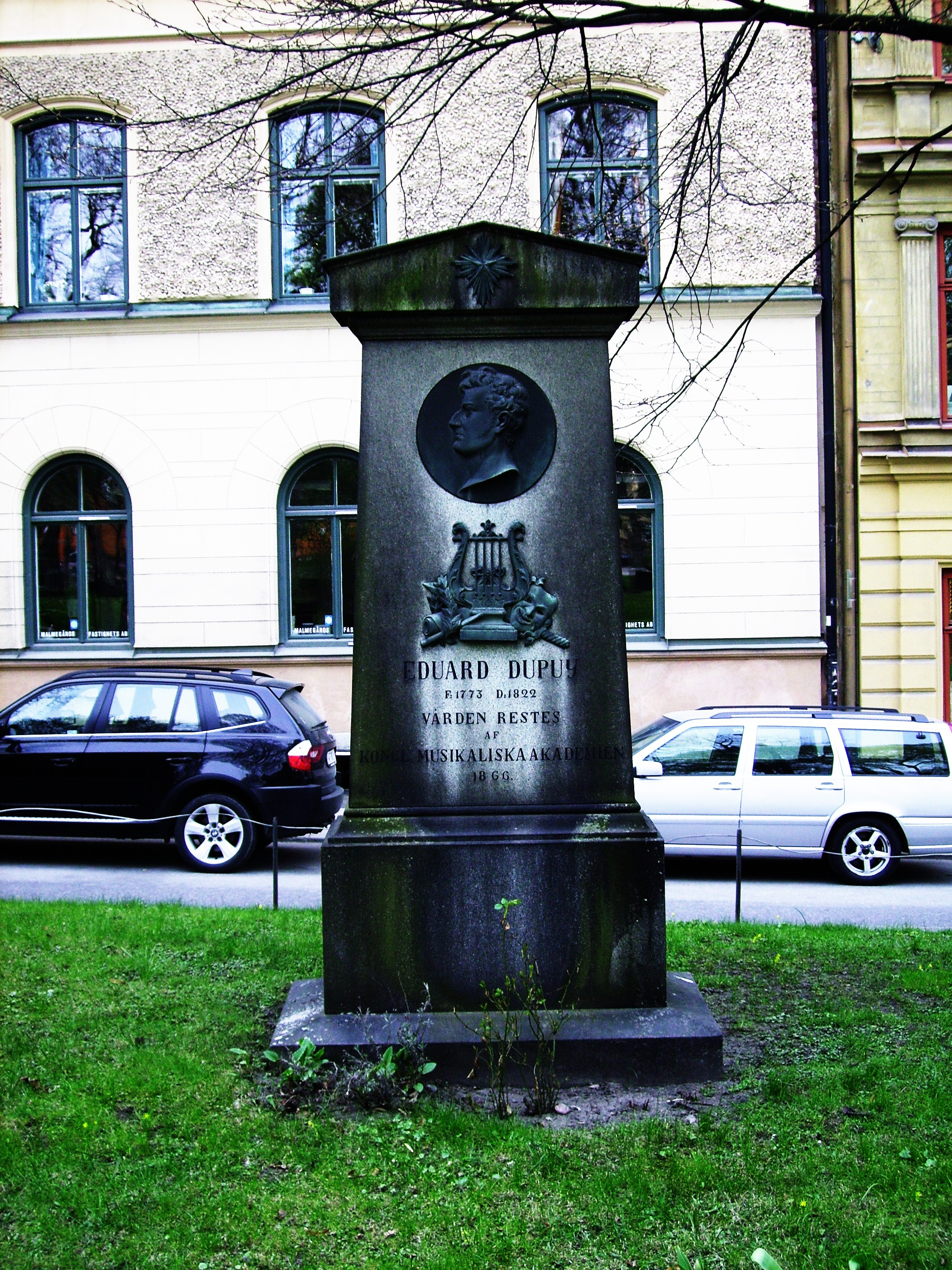
Édouard du Puy's grave, Johannes kyrkogård in Stockholm.

Du Puy died in his fifties, on 3 April 1822, while in Sweden. He was buried in the Johannes cemetery in Stockholm, where the Royal Swedish Academy of Music raised a monument in his honor in 1866. At his funeral, Mozart's Requiem was performed in Sweden for the first time.

As a violinist, Du Puy had a virtuoso style, with a firm intonation and sense of music. His voice was a light baritone, but he could also sing as a tenor, bass or even falsetto. He was also an acclaimed director and Kapellmeister. The Swedish Royal Chapel was one of Europe's best orchestras at the time, and Du Puy is mentioned as one of its best Kapellmeisters. His compositions are light, melodious and lively.

Choreographer for the Royal Danish Ballet, August Bournonville, made the ballet Livjægerne på Amager in 1871 in Du Puy's honor, about his life and using some of his compositions

== Selected works ==
- Youth and Folly (Ungdom og Galskap), a successful singspiel of 1806
- Requiem in C minor for organ (1807)
- Föreningen (play 1815)
- Agander och Pagander (play 1818)
- Balder (1819)
- Felicie or Den romaneska flickan (comical opera 1821)
- Björn Jernsida (unfinished opera)
- Festen för den gamle generalen (ballet)
- Violin Concerto in C major
- Violin Concerto in D minor
- Violin Concerto in E major
- Concerto for 2 violins
- Bassoon Concerto in C minor
- Flute Concerto in D minor
- Clarinet Concerto
- Bassoon Concerto
- Horn Concerto
- Quartet No. 2 for strings
- Quintet in C minor for strings
- Quintet in A minor for bassoon and strings
- Introduktion und Polonaise: for clarinet and piano
- Duets for violin
- 12 contra dance for piano
- Horn quartet
- Horn Trio
- 6 quartets for 2 tenors and 2 basses

== Sources ==
- This article was initially translated from the Danish Wikipedia.
- Livjægerne på Amager, Bournonville-ballet med Du Puy som emne
- Mogens Wenzel Andreasen: Ungdom og Galskab - en guldalderroman om Du Puy og Weyse
- Nordisk familjebok 1907
- Salmonsens konversationsleksikon 1917
- Dansk biografisk Leksikon 1905
- Musik-Lexikon
- John Denison Champlin Jr., William Foster Apthorp, Cyclopedia of Music and Musicians, Volume I, Charles Scribner's Sons, 1888, p. 466-467.
- Oscar Thompson, The International Cyclopedia of Music and Musicians, Dodd, Mead & Company, 1975, p. 605
