= Francis Gregor =

British politician (1760–1815)

Francis Gregor (1 June 1760 – 12 July 1815) was an English landowner in Cornwall, Member of Parliament for the Cornwall county constituency from 1790 to 1806.

== Life ==
Gregor was born on 1 June 1760 in Trewarthenick, Cornwall, the son of Cpt Francis Gregor (born 1728), owner of the Trewarthenick Estate and Mary Copley. His younger brother was the Rev. William Gregor, the mineralogist. He was educated at Truro Grammar School, Bristol Grammar School and St John's College, Cambridge, where he graduated B.A. as third wrangler in 1782, before being admitted to study law at Lincoln's Inn in 1783. He was High Sheriff of Cornwall in 1788–1789, and on 10 July 1790 was elected as one of the knights of the shire for Cornwall, "after a severe and protracted contest". Elected unopposed in 1796 and 1802, he retired from the House of Commons in 1806.

In 1802 he was elected a Fellow of the Royal Society of Edinburgh his proposers being Dugald Stewart, Alexander Fraser Tytler and Sir William Arbuthnot, 1st Baronet.

Gregor was married twice: first to Catherine, daughter of William Masterman, of Restormel Castle; second, in 1795, to Jane, daughter of William Urquhart, of Craigston, Aberdeenshire.

He died 12 July 1815 at the age of 55. At his death, his brother, William, inherited the Trewarthenick Estate.

His Works were published by Thomas Flindell of Exeter, by subscription, in 1816. The book was reviewed in The Augustan Review in 1816. The review includes substantial extracts from the book and an obituary notice (stating that he studied at Cambridge and the Inns of Court).

Parliament of Great Britain
Preceded by Sir William Molesworth, Bt and Sir William Lemon, Bt	Member of Parliament for Cornwall; 1790–1801; With: Sir William Lemon, Bt	Succeeded by Parliament of the United Kingdom
Parliament of the United Kingdom
Preceded by Parliament of Great Britain	Member of Parliament for Cornwall; 1801–1806; With: Sir William Lemon, Bt	Succeeded by Sir William Lemon, Bt and John Hearle Tremayne
