= Cuby, Cornwall =

Former parish in Cornwall, England

Coordinates: 50.271°N 4.892°W

Cuby
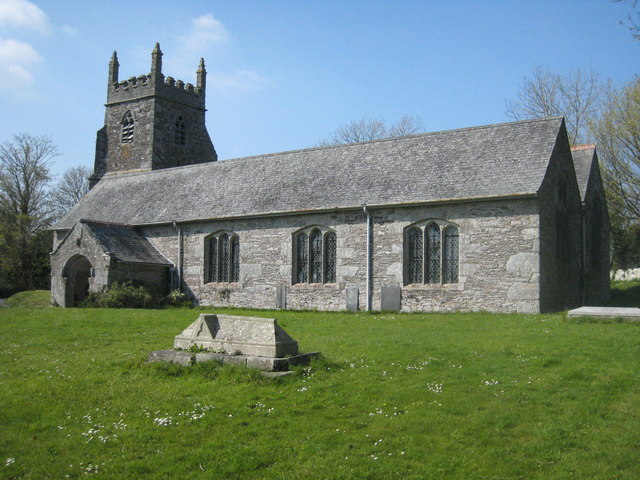
- St Cuby's Church

- Location within Cornwall
- Civil parish: Tregony with Cuby
- Unitary authority: Cornwall
- Ceremonial county: Cornwall
- Region: South West
- Country: England
- Sovereign state: United Kingdom
- Police: Devon and Cornwall
- Fire: Cornwall
- Ambulance: South Western

Cuby (Cornish: Sen Kubi) was formerly a civil parish in Cornwall, England, United Kingdom, situated approximately 7 miles (12 km) southwest of St Austell. The parish was created in 1866 from the part of the ancient parish of Tregony which lay outside Tregony's borough boundaries. It was named after the parish church, dedicated to St Cuby, which stands on the north-eastern edge of Tregony, but was just outside the old borough boundary. In 2021 the parish was reunited with Tregony to form a new parish called Tregony with Cuby. The parish of Cuby was always rural, with no significant settlements. At the 2011 census (the last before the parish's abolition) it had a population of 178.

== History ==
Tregony was an ancient parish in the Powder Hundred of Cornwall. The original parish church, dedicated to St James, stood on the banks of the Fal at the western end of the parish. A chapel of ease dedicated to St Cuby was subsequently built in the 12th century to the north-east of Tregony, on higher ground and in a location which was more accessible for the rural parts of the parish. St James's Church was subsequently washed away by the changing course of the Fal in the 16th century. After that, the former chapel of St Cuby became the parish church. Following the loss of St James's Church there was some ambiguity about the name of the parish; in one court case in 1859 the parish was referred to as "St James and Cuby, otherwise Keby, otherwise Tregony, otherwise Tregony Martin, otherwise Tregony and Cuby".

As well as being a parish, Tregony had also become a borough by the early 13th century. The borough just covered the western tip of the parish around the settlement itself, whereas the parish included rural areas, particularly to the east. Parishes were given various civil functions under the poor laws from the 17th century onwards. Civil functions were administered separately for the area of Tregony borough and the rest of the parish. In 1866, the legal definition of 'parish' was changed to be the areas used for administering the poor laws, and so the old parish was split into two civil parishes: "Tregony" matching the borough, and "Cuby" covering the rural parts of the old parish outside the borough, taking its name from St Cuby's church, which lay just outside the borough boundaries, albeit on the edge of the built up area. Despite the split of the civil parish, Tregony and Cuby continued to form a single ecclesiastical parish.

Cuby remained a civil parish until 2021. In November 2020, Cornwall Council decided to merge it with neighbouring Tregony, forming a new parish called Tregony with Cuby, which came into effect on 1 April 2021.

== Cuby Parish Church ==
The church of Cuby is dedicated to Saint Cuby, a Cornish saint: since the parish church of Tregony was lost to the River Fal around 1540, Cuby Parish Church has been in fact the parish church of Tregony also. The church was rebuilt in 1828 though some of the medieval masonry still exists on the north side and the tower (of two stages) is of the 14th century. In the south aisle is an inscribed stone of the 6th or 7th century (Nonnita Ercilini Rigati [...]tris Fili Ercilini). The church in Norman times belonged to the alien priory at Tregony but in 1278 ownership passed to Merton Priory in Surrey.

== Notable person ==
William Hennah, first lieutenant of HMS Mars is buried at Cuby Parish Church. His ship was part of the British fleet under Lord Nelson at the Battle of Trafalgar.
