= Christ Is Risen! Christ Is Risen! =

English Christian hymn

- Hymn
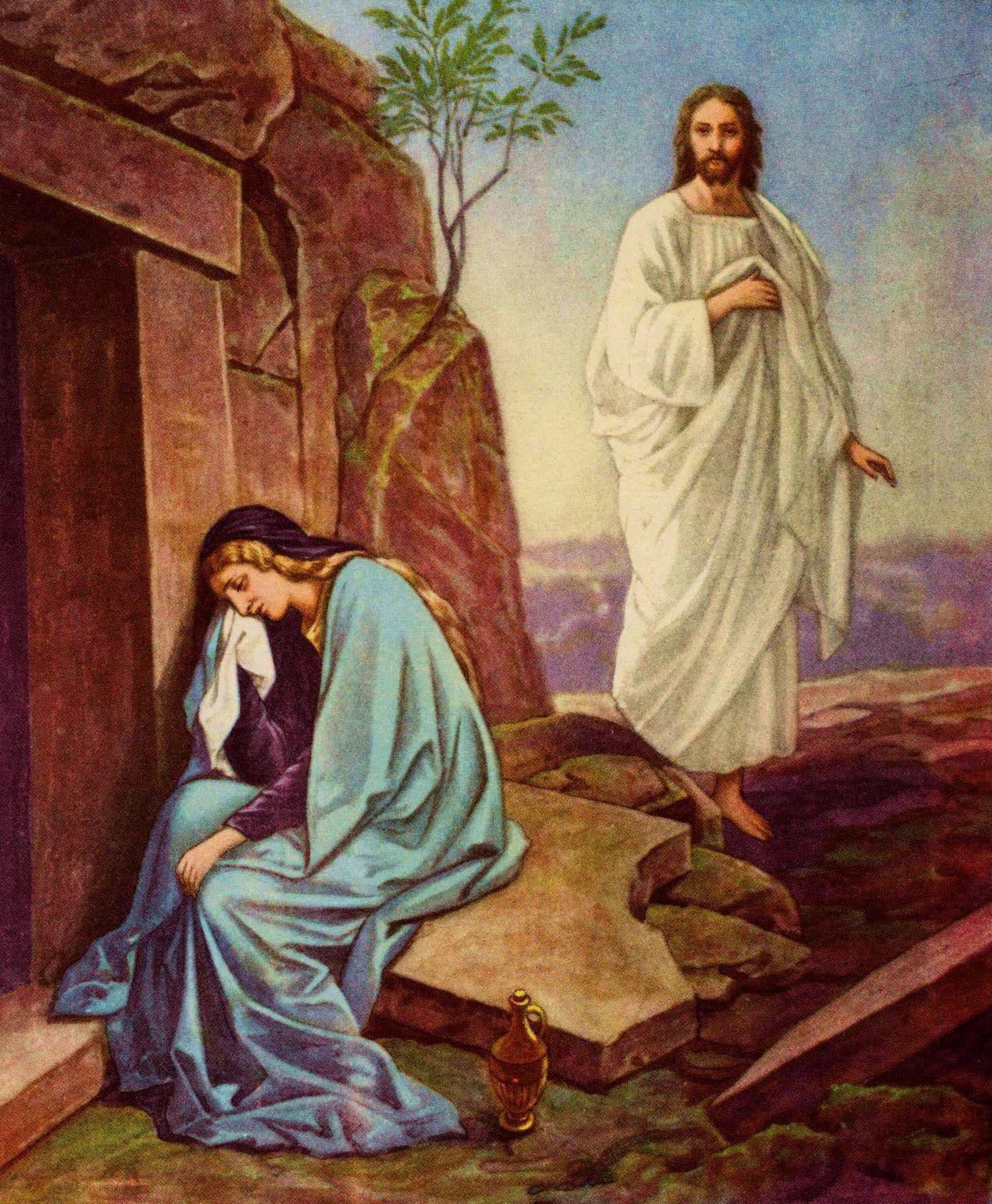
- Jesus appears to Mary Magdalene after his resurrection
- Occasion: Easter
- Written: 1862
- Text: Archer Thompson Gurney
- Language: English
- Based on: Matthew 28:6

"Christ Is Risen! Christ Is Risen!" is an English Christian hymn for Easter. It was written by Archer Thompson Gurney in 1862.

== History ==
"Christ Is Risen! Christ Is Risen!" was written by Archer Thompson Gurney in 1862 and was self-published the same year in A Book of Praise. In 1871, a revised version was published in Church Hymns. Gurney expressed his open dissent against the new arrangement in a letter to Church Times. John Ellerton, one of the editors of Church Hymns, responded to this in 1881 by appending a statement that "the variations in this hymn amount to an almost complete recasting of it. The fine conception of the hymn was grievously marred by faulty execution, and sincere thanks are due to the author for permitting his original to be so daringly manipulated". A third version of the hymn was published in 1875 in Hymns Ancient and Modern, again against the wishes of Gurney. The latter two versions were sent to the United States, which gained the hymn awareness there. Gurney's original musical composition received little attention beyond his original self-publication. This is the only hymn of Gurney's that has entered into common usage in the Church of England and other Christian denominations.

An 1874 melody for the hymn, titled "Resurrexit", by Arthur Sullivan (of Gilbert and Sullivan) was used by the Church of England in Canada's The Book of Common Praise.

== World usage ==
"Christ Is Risen! Christ Is Risen!" retained popularity for Easter throughout the world and was sometimes used as a basis for Easter sermons due to being based on Matthew 28:6. The hymn symbolises Jesus breaking the chains of sin which had restricted humanity until his resurrection.
