= John Worthington Adams =

British major-general

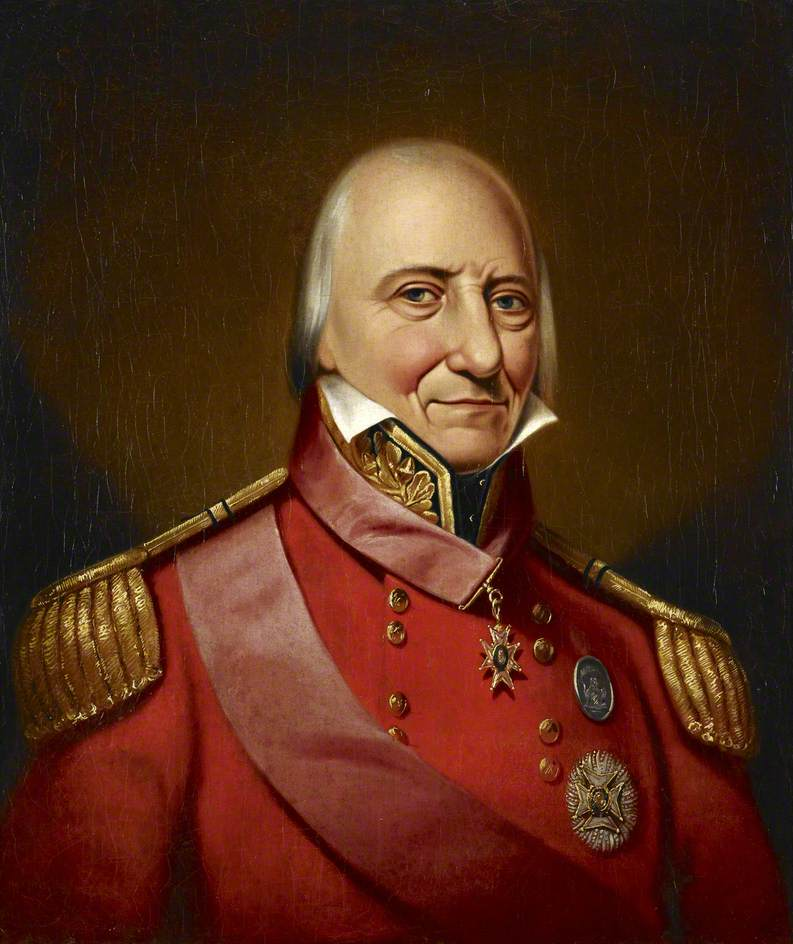
Adams in around 1837, by William Melville

Major General Sir John Worthington Adams, KCB (1764 – 9 March 1837) was a senior British army officer who served in India.

Adams joined the Army in 1780. During the Rohilla War he fought under Sir Robert Abercromby. He was present during the Battle of Seringapatam in 1799. In 1809 he commanded a regiment in Central India. He became a Companion of the Order of the Bath in 1815. Adams then held commands at Kumaon, Nagpur and the Dekkan. He took Chanda in 1818 and was at Bharatpur in 1826. In May 1828 he took command of the Sirhind Division. In 1830 Adams was promoted to major-general. At some point he became Colonel of the 16th Bengal Infantry Regiment and was elevated to a Knight Commander of the Order of the Bath in the 1831 Coronation Honours.

Adams died at Sabathu on 9 March 1837.
