= Trewarthenick =

Hamlet in Cornwall, England

Coordinates: 50.25856°N 4.94755°W

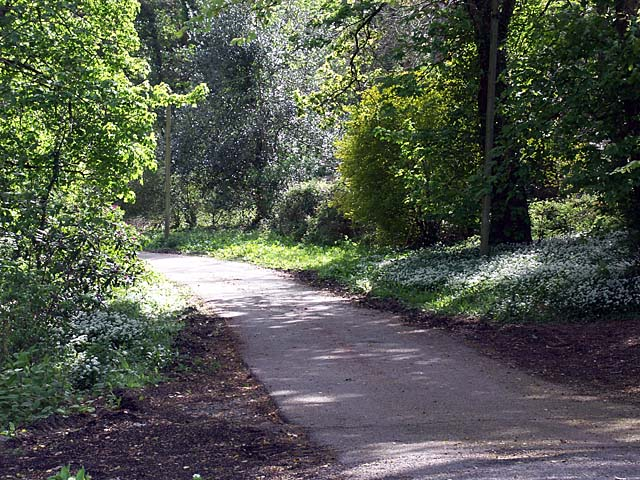
A lane through woods near Trewarthenick

Trewarthenick (Cornish: Trewedhenek) is a hamlet in the civil parish of Tregony in Cornwall, England, United Kingdom.

Trewarthenick lies within the Cornwall Area of Outstanding Natural Beauty (AONB). Almost a third of Cornwall has AONB designation, with the same status and protection as a National Park.

William Gregor, the discoverer of titanium, was born on the Trewarthenick Estate as was his brother Francis Gregor, MP for the County of Cornwall from 1790 to 1806.

== Map sources ==
Map resources for Trewarthenick at grid reference SW9044
