= Eleonora Zrza =

Danish opera soprano

Eleonora Christine Zrza
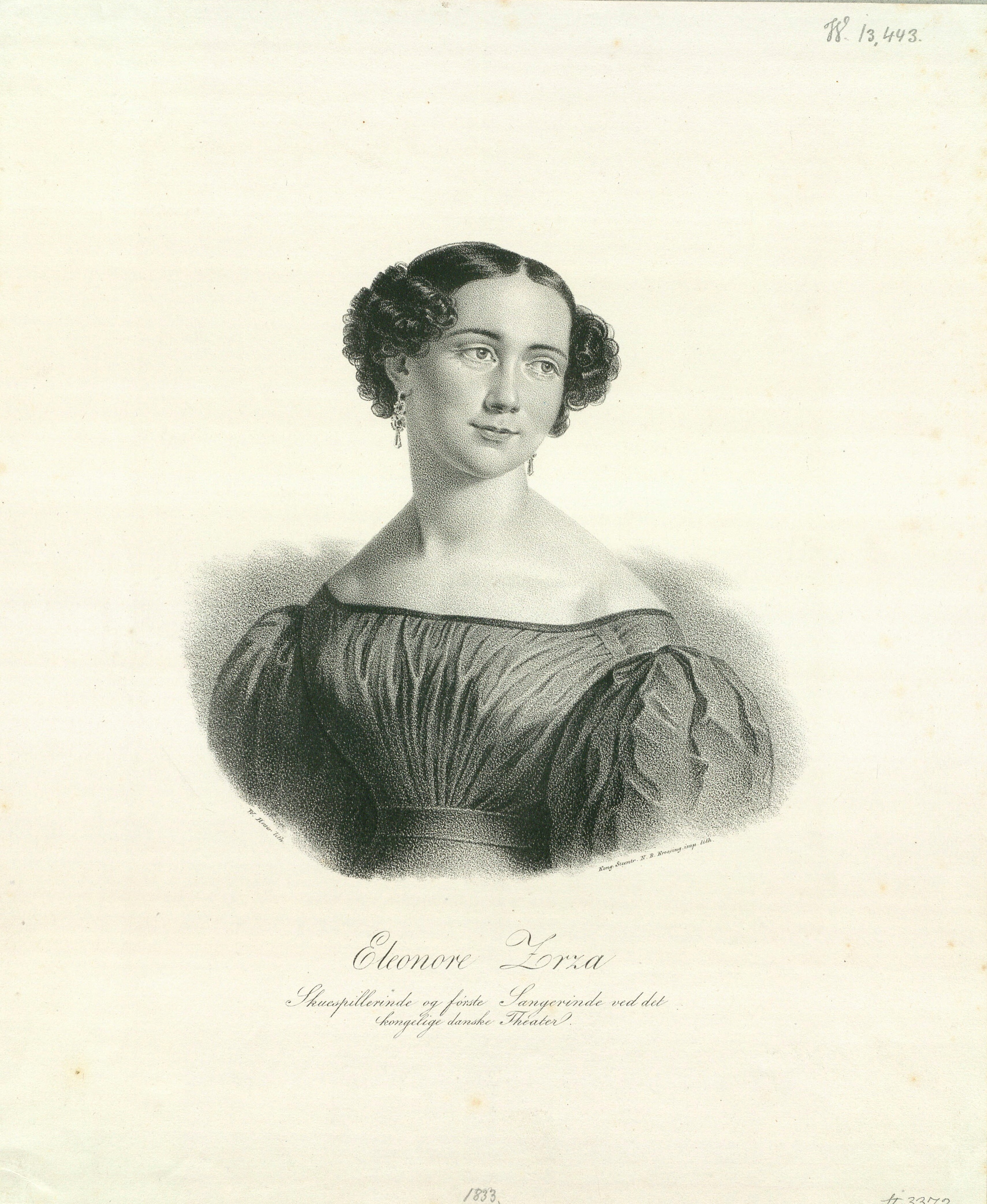
- Portrait of Zorza by Wilhelm Heuer, 1833
- Born: May 22, 1797; Bagsværd, Denmark
- Died: November 1, 1862 (aged 65); Copenhagen, Denmark
- Resting place: Assistens Cemetery

Eleonora Christine Zrza (22 May 1797 – 1 November 1862), was a Danish opera soprano. She was known for her unusually high and resonant soprano voice and was regarded as one of the leading forces of the Danish opera during the first half of the 19th century. She was active at the Royal Danish Theatre from 1814 until 1845, having made her debut there in 1816.

== Biography ==
In 1814, Zrza gained a position at the Royal Danish Theatre as a member of the choir. While there, it is likely that she received vocal lessons from Friedrich Ludwig Æmilius Kunzen. Her style is believed to have been influenced by Minna Becker, daughter of Joseph Karl Ambrosch.

In April 1816, she made her debut at the Royal Danish Theatre as Charlotte in a production of Christoph Ernst Friedrich Weyse's Sovedrikken. In September of that year, she played the role of Wilhemine in Ungdom og Galskap.

Zrza was promoted from being a member of the choir to an actress with the theatre in 1817. In 1820, she was appointed as a royal actress. At the time, she was the student of Giuseppe Siboni. She performed as the countess in the company's 1821 production of The Marriage of Figaro. Shortly thereafter she performed in Ferdinando Paer's Sargino. Here other roles as royal actress included Sidi in Lulu, Isabella in Robert af Normandiet, Rosina in The Barber of Seville, and Queen of the Erdgeister in Hans Heiling. She made her last theatrical appearance in February 1845, reprising her role as Wilhemine in Ungdom og Galskap.

== Personal life ==
Eleonora Christine Zrza was born 22 May 1797 in Bagsværd. Her father, Fraz Anton Xaverius Zrza (1761–1843), was an oboist, french horn player, and court violinist who had immigrated to Denmark from Moravia. Her mother, Eleonora Rosalia Stuart (d. 1810), was a ballet dancer at the Royal Danish Ballet.

Zrza never married and was plagued by rumours of affairs and illegitimate children. She is known to have had an affair with Martin Christian Eisen, with whom she had a daughter in 1817, Kristiane Wilhelmine Eisen. Their daughter was raised by Martin and his wife. Eleonora Zrza died on 1 November 1862 in Copenhagen. Few attended her funeral, as her legacy had been largely forgotten in Denmark. She was buried at Assistens Cemetery.
