= Mary Ann Tocker =

First woman to act as her own advocate in a British court of law

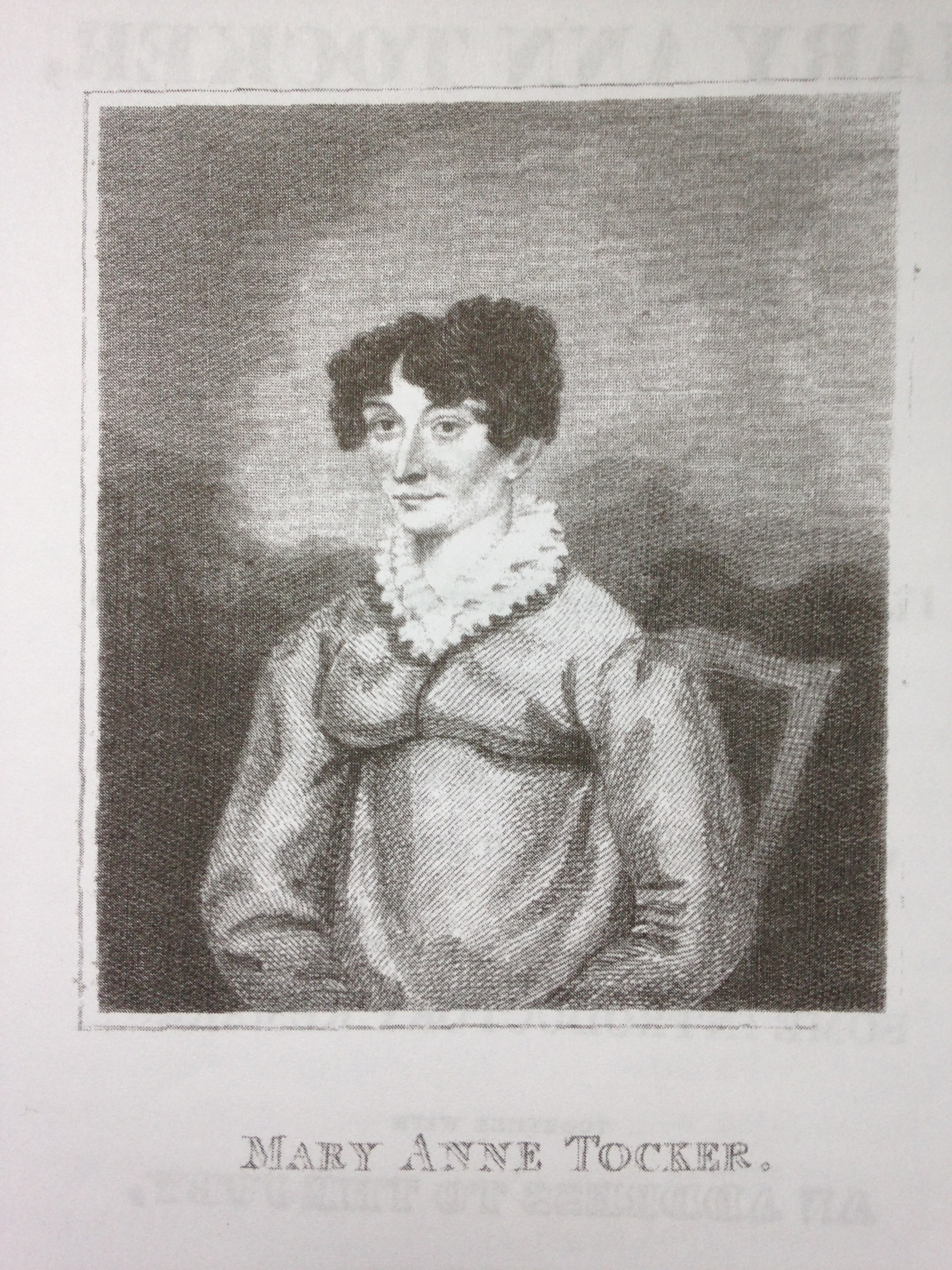
- A likeness of Mary Ann Tocker from her own account of her trial, 1818
- Born: 1778; Tregony, Cornwall, England
- Died: 1853 (aged 74–75); Penryn, Cornwall, England
- Occupations: Legal activist; pamphleteer
- Known for: First woman to act as her own advocate in a British court (Bodmin, 1818); early female radical; libel defendant
- Relatives: Henry Tocker (brother)

Mary Ann Tocker (1778–1853) was the first woman in Cornwall to be tried for libel and was celebrated as the first woman to act as her own advocate in a British court of law. She has been referred to as the first woman lawyer. She was seen as a heroine by the radical writers of her day. Her case was widely discussed in the months following her trial in August 1818. She is still referred to today in books on early women radicals as having inspired others with her stand against corruption.

== Early life ==
Mary Ann Tocker was born in Tregony in 1778. She was daughter of Thomas Wheare Tocker and Dorothy Hearle. Born the second of six children, she became the eldest after the death of her older sister in 1799. Her father, Thomas Wheare Tocker, was an attorney in law from Gwinear. He died in debt in 1796 after months of illness. At the time of the trial, Mary Ann, her widowed mother and younger siblings were living in Plymouth. One brother, Henry, was studying law and hoping to become a solicitor.

== Background to the trial ==
In 1813, the Rev. Gurney of Tregony obtained for his younger son, Richard Gurney, the lucrative post of Vice-warden of the Stannaries. He arranged that Richard should lodge in the Tockers' house in Plymouth and employ Henry Tocker as his secretary. Richard Gurney gambled and ran up debts. In 1817, his tailor took out a suit of outlawry against him and Gurney fled to the Continent. The Tockers had not received any rent from Gurney nor had Henry had received the salary promised for his secretarial work. The Tockers wrote to Richard's father, the Rev. Gurney, but he refused to interfere in his son's affairs. Mary Ann wrote to Richard's brother, the Vicar of Paul, and his answer revealed that his family had all but disowned Richard.

On 6 June 1817, an anonymous letter appeared in The West Briton signed, ‘An enemy to corruption.’ The writers of the letter were Mary Ann and Henry Tocker. They exposed Richard's corrupt behaviour as Vice-warden of the Stannaries. When Richard Gurney put pressure on the editor of the West Briton to reveal the name of the writer, Mary Ann confessed that she was the writer of the letter. As Richard had the power to prevent Henry from ever succeeding as a solicitor in Plymouth, he had a hold over his former secretary. He forced Henry to write a letter begging his forgiveness for the injury done to him in the anonymous letter. However, Mary Ann could not be silenced and Richard took out the indictment for libel that brought her to court in Bodmin as if she were the sole writer of the letter.

== Trial ==
On 4 August 1818, Mary Ann entered the crowded courtroom accompanied by her brother, Henry Tocker, and one sister. When the judge expressed the opinion that the case would not be defended, Henry rose to inform him that it would be defended by the defendant herself. The exact charge against the defendant, as read out in court, was that of, "Committing a most serious offence, in slandering the character of a gentleman in high judicial situation, by imputing to him practices of the greatest criminality, in a letter published in a newspaper called the West Briton." The letter was then read out by the barrister for the prosecution. In it Richard Gurney was accused of gaining his position through the borough mongering system and of neglecting his duties as a judge while himself outlawed for debt. He was also accused of demanding money from suitors before settling cases in the Stannary court. The prosecution called the editor of the West Briton to confirm that Mary Ann Tocker was the author of the letter but called no further witnesses. Mary Ann stood again to make her own defence. For two hours, she defended herself in spite of repeated interruptions from the judge. She quoted widely from Blackstone's Commentaries, John Locke's Essay concerning Human Understanding and the words of the Lord Chief Justice, Lord Ellenborough. The main points she made in her defence were that :

- Her letter had not been published from malicious motives as she had only dwelt on the Vice-warden's misconduct in his official capacity.
- Men in public office could not complain about fair comment on the execution of their duty.
- Her reading of history, jurisprudence and moral philosophy led her to believe that the law was perverted when the maxim, 'the greater the truth, the greater the libel', directed the decision.
- She could prove in evidence that all the charges she made in her letter were true:
1. It was common knowledge and reported in the papers that Richard Gurney had obtained the position of Vice-warden after his father had arranged for Lord Falmouth's candidate to be returned at the Tregony election.
2. Gurney's own letters, from which she quoted, proved that he was declared an outlaw for debt.
3. His own letters also proved that he was out of the country and unable to attend to his duties of the Stannary court from 1815 to 1819.
4. Gurney had demanded sums over and above the fees of the court as his own letters and a witness could confirm.

The Judge told Mary Ann that she would not be allowed to prove anything nor was she allowed to call witnesses. She, then, drew her defence to a close with appeals to the jurors. She asked them to imagine how they would feel in the future if they had sent an innocent person to prison and she made a plea for common sense to prevail: "I trust that it will be seen this day, that it is more hazardous to commit a crime, than to publish that crime when committed." Finally, Mary Ann asked that, as the prosecution was only nominally at the suit of the crown, the real prosecutor, Richard Gurney, might be called so that she could compel him to admit the facts. Yet again, she was told this would not be allowed and Mary Ann left the court.

The judge then charged the Jury. He pronounced the whole letter an atrocious libel. He impressed upon them that it was not for them to decide the truth or falsehood of the assertions made as that would come before the Court of the King's Bench. He reminded them that the law allowed him to give his opinion. He told them that the publication was 'libellous in the highest degree, as it charged in the strongest way possible, a gentleman filling a high judicial position with the grossest corruption.' He finished by telling the Jury that they could not possibly lay their hand to their heart and say this publication was not libel. The jurors then asked for the papers which Mary Ann had wanted to read to them. A room was then provided for them at an inn opposite the hall. The Judge withdrew desiring them to bring the verdict to his lodgings. After about half an hour, the jury was introduced to his Lordship and the foreman pronounced a verdict of not guilty. Mary Ann later commented on the reaction of the crowds: “Even the Ex-Vice Warden, his father and brother, these pious and charitable pastors who came to witness my condemnation and ruin, must have heard the loud cheering of the different parties of legal gentlemen at the principal inn in Bodmin on receiving the news.”

== Reaction ==
The reporter from the Treman's Exeter Flying Post was the first to publish an account of the trial on 13 August. Mary Ann then published her own account of the trial with a full transcription of her defence. She claimed that the case was singular in that it was the first case of libel ever tried in Cornwall. In her dedication and thanks to, “The Honest, patriotic and intrepid jury,” she claims she was motivated by, “the strongest principle in human nature – resistance to oppression.” By 17 August, The Times of London was reporting on the trial: “The justice of her cause and her powerful eloquence secured her success. This lady is of a very respectable family and her own character has always been held in esteem. Her extraordinary abilities have raised her to considerable notice and her company is now anxiously courted in the first societies.”

Mary Ann's cause was taken up by leading radicals of the day. A summary of the trial was published by William Cobbett, then in exile in America, which went on to three editions. Richard Carlile also published an edition of Mary Ann's Trial in London. Fairburn's edition stressed the novelty of an appearance of a woman in court with the title, “A Female Orator! And Politician! At the Bar!!!” Thomas Jonathan Wooler, the writer of The Black Dwarf, published Mary Ann's account in his magazine acclaiming Mary Ann's success as a victory for the rights of man. From the Inner Temple, Richard Gurney published his reply to Mary Ann's pamphlet. He defended the Law of Libel as expounded by the judge and attacked Mary Ann's character. In response, Mary Ann published a second pamphlet entitled, “Reply of Mary Ann Tocker to the false and scurrilous pamphlet of Mr. R. Gurney, ex-vice warden of the Stannaries...” In May 1819, her finances were improved for the Morning Chronicle records that a donation was received by Miss Mary Ann Tocker. The Devon County Club had raised the sum of fifty guineas in recognition of her achievement.

Apart from publishing her pamphlets, little is known of Mary Ann Tocker after her trial in August 1818. However, the 1841 census shows she was still living in Breton Side, Plymouth, with her younger brother, Henry, by then a successful Plymouth solicitor. Aged 62, she was listed as a woman of 'independent means.' By 1851, she was living in Glanville Street, and was described in the census as an annuitant. She lived to the age of 75 and ended her days in Penryn, close to her relatives in Falmouth. Mary Ann lived to see how the Reform Act 1832 did away with the corrupt electoral practices of the rotten boroughs. Then twenty five years after her trial, the Libel Act 1843 changed the law on Libel to allow a defendant to argue that what had been said was true and in the public interest just as Mary Ann had argued.

== Legacy ==
Mary Ann Tocker's trial was brought to the attention of the first women lawyers in America in 1958. Writing in the Women Lawyers Journal, Harry J. Marks gives his account of the trial and recommends to his readers that they should regard Mary Ann as a forerunner of their profession. More recently, Mary Ann's trial is often referred to in books on early women radicals. While Mary Ann may not have been connected to any of the radical movements of the nineteenth century, she is recognised as having inspired other women. "Mary Ann Tocker, who braved a libel to expose political corruption, inspired many other women with her forthright public radicalism and even led Thomas Hardy to write the anonymous letter to the Black Dwarf calling for woman's rights." Like other early women radicals, Mary Ann educated herself and was motivated by her own experiences of injustice to argue for reform. "The prospect of the female reformer embodied in the stand of Mary Ann Tocker, prompted discussion of the form as well as the meaning of radicalism; a subject that animated a series of letters, editorials and poems, mocking and defending the 'Rights of Woman' and woman's 'ascendancy' over man."
