= The Roseland Academy =

- Akademi an Ros
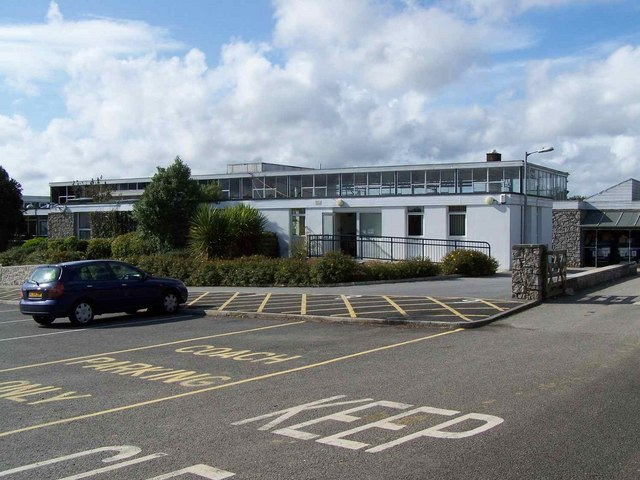

Location
- Tregony, Cornwall, TR2 5SE; England; 50.27144°N 4.90608°W

Information
- Type: Academy
- Established: 1963
- Department for Education URN: 136572 Tables
- Ofsted: Reports
- Headteacher: Richard Clarke
- Gender: Coeducational
- Age: 11 to 16
- Website: http://www.theroseland.co.uk/

The Roseland Academy (Cornish: Akademi an Ros) is a coeducational English-language secondary school with academy status, located in Tregony in Cornwall, UK.

The school was established in 1963, and became a comprehensive in 1976. Previously a foundation school administered by Cornwall Council, Roseland Community College converted to academy status on 1 April 2011. The school continues to coordinate with Cornwall Council for admissions.

The Roseland Academy offers GCSEs, BTECs and OCR Nationals as programmes of study for pupils. The school also offers some vocational courses in conjunction with Truro and Penwith College and Cornwall College.

== Notable former pupils ==
- Jack Andrew, rugby player
