= Trewarthenick Estate =

Country house in Cornwall, England

- Location within Cornwall
- 50.26097°N 4.943379°W
- Location: Trewarthenick, Tregony, Cornwall, England

Listed Building – Grade II
- Official name: Trewarthenick
- Designated: 27 November 1985
- Reference no.: 1291655

National Register of Historic Parks and Gardens
- Official name: Trewarthenick
- Designated: 11 June 1987
- Reference no.: 1000658

The Trewarthenick Estate is a Grade II listed manor house and estate located in the hamlet of Trewarthenick near Tregony in Cornwall, England. The house was originally built in around 1686 and has seen considerable alterations over the years.

== History ==
The Gregor family had owned land in Trewarthenick from 1640, and in about 1686 commissioned a country house. With grounds remodelled by Humphry Repton in around 1792, it was then extended with flanking wings by Henry Harrison of London in 1831. William Gregor who discovered Manaccanite in 1790, and the MP Francis Gregor were both born and raised in the property. After post-World War II renovation, the flanking wings were removed around 1950.

Mary Letitia Welman and the Welman family owned the house until after WW2.

In 2008, the property was bought for £9 million by businessman Marcus Evans, then consisting of an estate covering some 1737 acres, with a 2.5 miles frontage on the River Fal.

== The house ==
Trewarthenick is a Grade II listed manor house, having been added to the listed buildings register on 28 November 1975. The property has been considerably altered over the years and was originally larger than it is now. A date-stone inscribed "1686" was relocated from its original position when the house was remodelled in 1792. Flanking wings were added in 1831 and possibly rear wings as well, the flanking wings being demolished in about 1950. The front is constructed of finely coursed slate-stone while the other external walls are made of rubble stone or faced with brick. The roof is slated, the rear wings having gable ends. The roof is concealed by a parapet and moulded cornice.

The central part of the house has two storeys and a part basement while the rear wings have three storeys. The east front is symmetrical with seven windows, the central three bays being advanced under a plain pediment. The central doorway has glazed double doors and a fanlight. The wooden sashes with twelve panes may date from 1831, but the central ones are probably from 1792. The north front has Tuscan columns and a date-stone with "1934" in the wall above. To the left are two small mullioned windows that have possibly been reused from an earlier version of the house. The interior has several original features including rooms with the original oak and pine panelling, various mouldings, a fine marble chimney-piece in mid-eighteenth century style and ceiling cornices of various periods.
