= William Hennah =

British naval officer (1768–1832)

Captain William Hennah CB
- Born: January 1768; St Austell, Cornwall, England
- Died: 23 December 1832 (aged 69); St Cuby, Cornwall, England
- Occupation: Royal Navy Captain

Captain William Hennah CB (January 1768 – 23 December 1832) was a British naval officer, whose largely undistinguished career was suddenly highlighted by his assumption of command of HMS Mars at the Battle of Trafalgar in 1805 upon the death of that ship's captain, George Duff, who was decapitated by a cannonball.

== Early career ==
Hennah was born in January 1768 and baptised on the 7th, the son of Richard Hennah, the vicar of St Austell in Cornwall. He joined the navy because of his Cornish hero, the circumnavigator Samuel Wallis, and was entered as captain's servant to Philip Walsh of HMS Alderney, in 1778. In March 1779 Hennah was rated as midshipman. He passed the lieutenant's exam at the beginning of January 1788 but was not promoted until the general round of promotions at the outbreak of the French Revolutionary War in 1793. Hennah had little opportunity for distinction until 1800, when he participated in a boat raid on the Morbihan river in which the French corvette Réloaise was burnt. He reportedly acquitted himself "with great judgement and gallantry", under the command of Lieutenant John Pilfold, another lieutenant who was to command a ship at Trafalgar.

== Trafalgar ==
Following the Peace of Amiens, Hennah was posted to HMS Mars as first lieutenant under George Duff, and was with the ship during the lead up to the battle of Trafalgar in 1805, when Mars was the first ship to spot the advancing enemy. He was stationed on the quarterdeck during the battle, and following the early death of Captain Duff, Hennah took command of the ship, directing her fire into the Fougueux, despite serious damage to his ship. Mars was so battered by the engagement that she was almost unmanoeuvrable, but continued to fire on any enemy ship which approached, including the French Algésiras and the Spanish Monarca. Following the action and emergency repairs, the Mars returned to Gibraltar with some difficulty, before Hennah was ordered home that winter.

== Later life ==
Back in London, Hennah received the Thanks of Parliament and a vase from the Patriotic Fund; the naval gold medal was presented to Duff's widow. He was promoted to Captain on 1 January 1806. He also received the very unusual honour of a Letter of Commendation from the ship's company, indicative of the esteem with which he was held even by the common sailors who served under him, who were rarely given over to such overt displays of affection. Hennah did not serve at sea again, settling with his family at Tregony in Cornwall where he lived as a country gentleman and involved himself in local affairs. He was invested as a Companion of the Bath in 1831, on the occasion of King William IV's Coronation Honours. He died peacefully at home in 1832 and was buried nearby at St Cuby Parish Church.

His obituary in The Times of 31 December 1832 read:

"On the 22inst at Tregony, Cornwall, Captain William Hennah CB one of the old school of British sailors, having entered the navy under Wallis, the circumnavigator and finished his active career in the wake of Collingwood at Trafalgar."
