= Richard Gurney =

English judge

Richard Gurney (1790–1843) was an English judge in the Stannary Courts of Devon. His corrupt practices were exposed during the trial of Mary Ann Tocker in 1818. Following the trial, he wrote a pamphlet expounding the Law of Libel at the time and attempting to defend his actions.

== Early life ==
Gurney grew up in Tregony, Cornwall. He was the youngest of three children by Rev. Richard Gurney and Bridget Oban. He aspired to be a writer and a poet. After his father failed to obtain a naval commission for him, he went to London to study law. He was admitted to the Inner Temple on 14 January 1812.

== Career ==
=== Vice-warden of the Stannaries of Devon 1812 – 1817 ===
In December 1812, when Gurney was 22 years old, he was appointed Vice-Warden of the Stannaries of Devon. He tried cases concerning mining disputes under Stannary Law. This post was obtained for him by his father, Rev. Gurney, as a reward for helping to return Lord Yarmouth's candidates as representative for the Borough of Tregony in the 1812 elections. Rev. Gurney was also instrumental in obtaining bribes for the voters. When questioned by the Select Committee of Parliament looking into corrupt electoral practices in the Borough, he denied all knowledge of the bribes and was tried for perjury.

When Gurney heard Robert Gifford (later 1st Baron Gifford) question his father's honesty, he challenged him to a duel. Refused satisfaction, he struck Robert Gifford with his horse whip and was charged with assault. When the case came to trial in 1814, Gurney was sentenced to six months imprisonment in Marshalsea prison.

In 1816 and 1818, Gurney was outlawed in Plymouth and Dock for debt and fled the country. He spent months at the gaming tables of Paris in the company of Major John Richardson, a Canadian gambler and author. Richardson's biographer writes of Gurney as a "poet, solicitor, and former Vice-Warden of the Stannaries of Devon, who owing to a predilection for the gaming table, neglected to attend court, took higher fees than allowed and, obliged to leave England, took refuge in Paris in 1818." As Vice -Warden of the Stannaries, he received an income of £50 a year, yet heard only two cases.

He lost his position after his corrupt behaviour was exposed by the publication of an anonymous letter in the West Briton newspaper in 1817. When Gurney discovered that the writer of the letter was Mary Ann Tocker, his former secretary's sister, he had her tried for libel.

=== Politics ===
Richard Gurney stood for parliament in the Borough of Tregony three times and failed each time. In 1830, he claimed to be elected member of parliament for Tregony, but did not succeed in obtaining the seat. He petitioned Parliament, claiming to have been returned by the legal returning-officer and accusing his opponents of bribery. The petition was found frivolous and vexatious and Gurney was awarded costs.

=== Travels on the Continent ===
In 1834, Gurney again fled to the continent to escape debt. Gurney traveled on the Continent with his wife and children for ten years. Having attended a few court levées in England, Gurney had a court suit. Dressed as a courtier, he was able to pose as a member of the Royal Court. He thus gained entry to the minor courts of Europe. Gurney traveled through Germany, Austria, Italy and France meeting other English expatriates such Sir Sidney Smith. He and his sons became acquainted with the poets, Karl Joseph Simrock, Franz Grillparzer, and Betty Paoli. His son, Archer Thompson Gurney, translated works by German poets into English. Gurney died in Bonn, Germany, in 1843. His wife, Catherine Harriet, died in 1876.

He was the author of:

- Fables on Men and Manners, 1809.
- Romeo and Juliet Travesty, 1812.
- Observations on a libel; for which an indictment was instituted by Richard Gurney, Jun. of the Inner Temple, Special Pleader, Vice-Warden of the Stannaries of Devon, against Mary Ann Tocker; of which the Defendant was found not guilty, 1818.
- The Battle of Salamanca, a Poem, 1820.
- The Maid of Prague, 1841.
