= Tregony =

Village in Cornwall, England

Coordinates: 50.268°N 4.911°W

Tregony: Cornish: Trerigoni
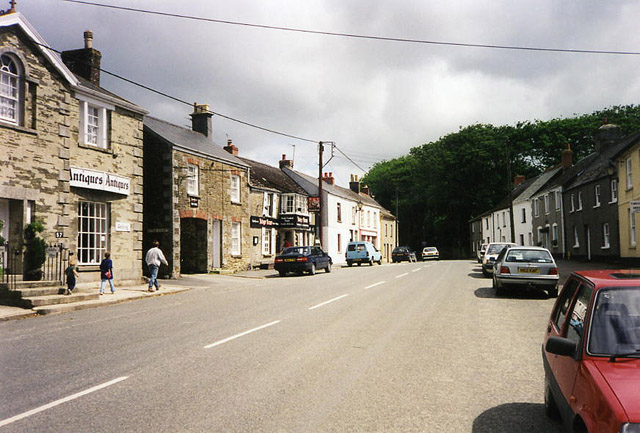
- Main street in Tregony

- Location within Cornwall
- Population: 1,093 (Tregony with Cuby parish, 2021); 788 (Tregony built up area, 2021)
- Civil parish: Tregony with Cuby
- Unitary authority: Cornwall
- Ceremonial county: Cornwall
- Region: South West
- Country: England
- Sovereign state: United Kingdom
- Post town: TRURO
- Postcode district: TR2
- Dialling code: 01872

Tregony (Cornish: Trerigoni), is a village in Cornwall, England, United Kingdom. Tregony was formerly a civil parish, but in 2021 it was merged with the neighbouring parish of Cuby to form a new parish called Tregony with Cuby. Tregony lies on the east bank of the River Fal, and is 6 miles (10 km) east of Truro. The Fal was historically navigable up to a port at Tregony. The village today has a shop with post office facilities, the Kings Arms pub, a sports and social club and two churches.

Tregony with Cuby parish also covers rural areas surrounding Tregony village, with several outlying farms. The part of the parish west of the River Fal was formerly the separate parish of Cornelly, which was absorbed into Tregony parish in 1934. At the 2021 census the population of Tregony with Cuby parish was 1,093 and the population of the Tregony built up area was 788.

== History ==
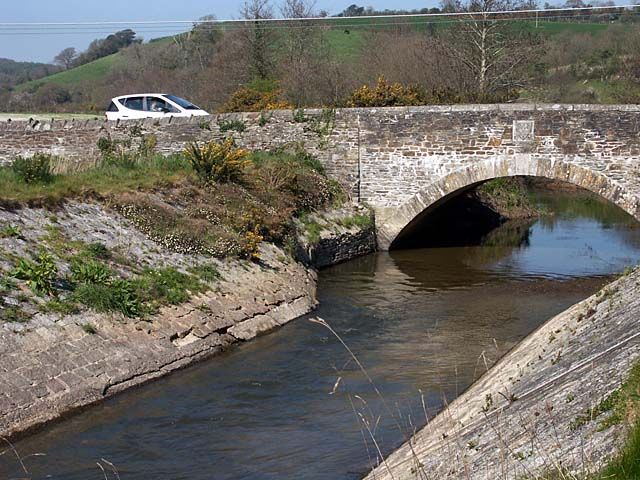
Tregony Bridge

The manor of Tregony was recorded in the Domesday Book (1086) when it was held by Frawin from Robert, Count of Mortain. Its earliest known spelling was Trefhrigoni, in 1049. There was 1 hide of land and land for 5 ploughs. There were 2 ploughs, 5 serfs, 3 villeins, 6 smallholders, 12 acres of woodland, 100 acres of pasture, 3 cattle, 40 sheep and 20 goats. The value of the manor was 15 shillings though it had formerly been worth 25 shillings.

Tregony was once a port, but clay mining upriver in St Austell has caused the river to become silted over.

Tregony was the birthplace of the Anglican churchman Archer Thompson Gurney. The Trewarthenick Estate in the hamlet of Trewarthenick in Cornelly parish, was the birthplace of William Gregor, a geologist-clergyman who discovered titanium. Captain William Hennah RN, who took part in the Battle of Trafalgar retired to Tregony and died there.

== Governance ==
There are two tiers of local government covering Tregony with Cuby, at parish and unitary authority level: Tregony with Cuby Parish Council and Cornwall Council. The parish council meets at Tregony Village Hall on Back Lane.

=== Administrative history ===
Tregony was an ancient parish in the Powder Hundred of Cornwall. The original parish church, dedicated to St James, stood on the banks of the Fal at the western end of the parish. A chapel of ease dedicated to St Cuby was subsequently built in the 12th century to the north-east of Tregony, on higher ground and in a location which was more accessible for the rural parts of the parish. St James's Church was subsequently washed away by the changing course of the Fal in the 16th century. After that, the former chapel of St Cuby became the parish church. Following the loss of St James's Church there was some ambiguity about the name of the parish; in one court case in 1859 the parish was referred to as "St James and Cuby, otherwise Keby, otherwise Tregony, otherwise Tregony Martin, otherwise Tregony and Cuby".

By 1201, Tregony had become a borough. The borough boundaries just covered the western tip of the parish around the settlement itself, which at the time was a small town focused on its river port. The borough served as a constituency for parliamentary elections on a couple of occasions in the late 13th century and early 14th century, and again from 1559 onwards as the Tregony parliamentary borough, electing two members of parliament. The constituency was abolished under the Reform Act 1832.

The blazon of the coat of arms of the borough of Tregony was "A pomegranate Or slipped and leaved Vert".

After the constituency's abolition in 1832, the borough corporation went into terminal decline, as its main function had come to be overseeing the parliamentary elections. New members were no longer appointed and the last meeting was held in 1845. The last mayor continued exercising some of the corporation's remaining functions on his own until 1849, when the corporation effectively became extinct. Any residual claim Tregony may have had to being a borough was extinguished in 1886 under the Municipal Corporations Act 1883.

Parish functions under the poor laws were administered separately for the area of Tregony borough and the rest of the parish, a pattern which continued after the borough ceased operating in the 1840s. In 1866, the legal definition of 'parish' was changed to be the areas used for administering the poor laws, and so the old parish was split into two civil parishes: "Tregony" matching the borough, and "Cuby" covering the rural parts of the old parish outside the borough, taking its name from St Cuby's church, which lay just outside the borough boundaries. Despite the split of the civil parish, Tregony and Cuby continued to form a single ecclesiastical parish.

When elected parish and district councils were created under the Local Government Act 1894, Tregony was given a parish council and included in the Truro Rural District. The neighbouring parish of Cornelly was abolished in 1934 and its area absorbed into Tregony parish.

Truro Rural District was abolished in 1974 under the Local Government Act 1972, when the area became part of the Carrick district. Carrick district was in turn abolished in 2009. Cornwall County Council then took on district-level functions, making it a unitary authority, and was renamed Cornwall Council.

On 1 April 2021, Tregony and Cuby parishes were merged to form a new parish called "Tregony with Cuby". At the 2011 census (one of the last before the abolition of the parish), Tregoney had a population of 768.

== Churches and schools ==
The Church of St James at Tregony was founded in the 11th century but in the early 16th century it was abandoned as it had been submerged by the tidal river. (This was caused by the building of Tregony Bridge ca. 1300 which led to the accumulation of alluvial deposits on the riverbed.) The church valuables were removed to Cuby Church sometime between 1530 and 1553: for many years thereafter the building was quarried for stone and no remains were to be seen by the early 20th century. The church had been founded by the Norman family of Pomeroy whose castle stood here: nearby there were also in mediaeval times a priory and a chapel of St Anne. There are no remains of any of these buildings either.

Since the parish lost its church, the parishioners have used Cuby Church instead. The other active church in Tregony is one of the few remaining independent Congregational churches—those that did not become part of the United Reformed Church. The former Methodist Church still has a small wooden sign on it but is now a private home.

It has a primary school in Back Lane. The area's secondary school, The Roseland Academy (built in 1962), is just over the Parish of Tregony boundary. It has also achieved specialist school status in Music with English and IT.

The almshouses were built in 1696 and rebuilt in 1895.

=== Cornelly church ===
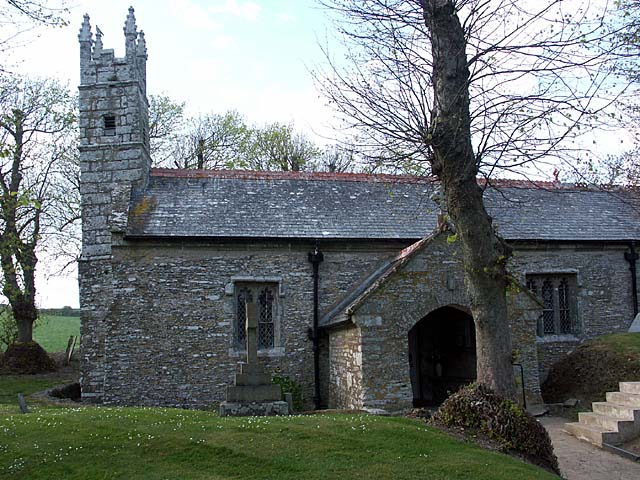
Cornelly church

The parish of Cornelly near Tregony has a church but no village: it is now grouped with Tregony and Cuby. Cornelly church is dedicated to St Cornelius and was built in the 13th century: the upper part of the tower, the south porch and the windows of the south wall are 15th century additions. The font is probably 16th century but of very crudely carved granite; the pulpit is painted with coats of arms; a monument to Jane Reeves, 1783, has an excellent portrait bust of her.

== Cornish wrestling ==
Cornish wrestling tournaments we held throughout the 1800s and 1900s in a field adjoining the King's Arms.

== Notable people ==
- William Gregor (1761–1817), clergyman and mineralogist who discovered the elemental metal Titanium.
- Captain William Hennah (1768–1832), naval officer, commanded HMS Mars at the Battle of Trafalgar in 1805, then retired locally
- Mary Ann Tocker (1778–1853), the first woman in Cornwall to be tried for libel
- Richard Gurney (1790–1843), an English judge in the Stannary Courts of Devon, accused of corrupt practices
- Archer Thompson Gurney (1820–1887) a Church of England clergyman and hymnwriter.
