= St Cuby's Church, Cuby =

Grade I church in Cuby, United Kingdom

St Cuby's Church
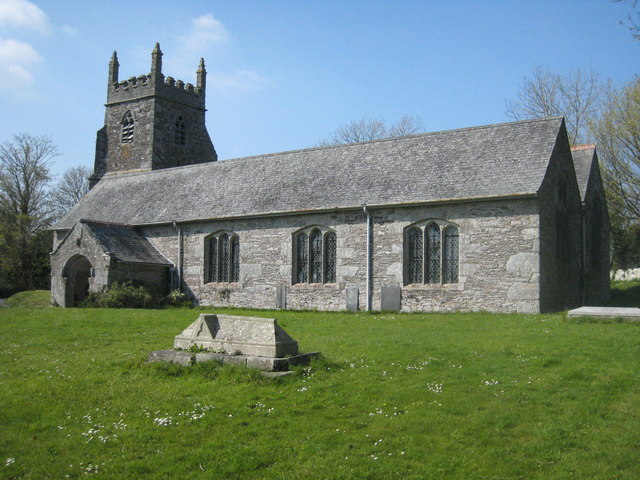

- Location within Cornwall
- 50.27078°N 4.90954°W
- Location: Cuby, Cornwall, England

Listed Building – Grade I
- Official name: Church of St Cuby
- Designated: 30 May 1967
- Reference no.: 1291868

The Church of St Cuby is a parish church which lies on the north-eastern outskirts of Tregony, Cornwall, England. It dates from the 12th century and was initially a chapel of ease to the parish church of St James at Tregony. After St James's Church was washed away by the changing course of the River Fal in the 16th century, St Cuby's Church became the parish church.

The church gave its name to Cuby, a civil parish which existed between 1866 and 2021 covering the rural parts of the ancient parish which lay outside Tregony's borough boundaries. Since 1967 the church has been designated a Grade I listed building. It is an active Anglican parish church in the diocese of Truro, the archdeaconry of Cornwall and the deanery of Pydar. Its benefice is combined with that of Cornelly.

== History ==
The church was dedicated to St. Cuby, a Welsh saint, around the 6th century CE. When the Church of St James at Tregony was submerged by the River Fal and subsequently abandoned in around 1540, the Church of St. Cuby became the parish church for Tregony. The current structure is a mixture of 12th-century, 14th-century and 15th-century architecture: some of the north side of the church and the tower is 14th century while the nave and south wall have some surviving 15th-century features. The church underwent major reconstruction in the 17th century, being lengthened and rebuilt in 1828 and then extensively restored in 1899. Some of the medieval masonry still exists on the north side and the tower (of two stages) is of the 14th century. In the south aisle is an inscribed stone of the 6th or 7th century (Nonnita Ercilini Rigati [...]tris Fili Ercilini). The church in Norman times belonged to the alien priory at Tregony but in 1278 ownership passed to Merton Priory in Surrey.

== External features ==
In the churchyard are two Grade II listed buildings: one is a mid 19th century chest tomb by Julef of Ladock that is 7 metres south of the east end of the church and the other a 19th-century granite coffin on a plinth which is situated 2 metres north of the east end of the church.

=== Notable burial ===
William Hennah, first lieutenant of HMS Mars is buried at Cuby Parish Church. His ship was part of the British fleet under Lord Nelson at the Battle of Trafalgar.
