= We Are Coming, Father Abra'am =

American patriotic song

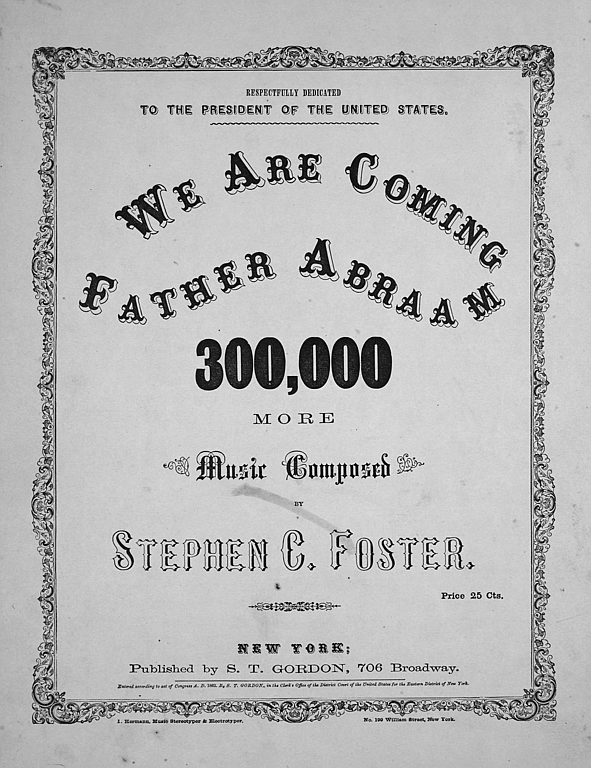

Song
- Published: 1862
- Genre: Wartime song
- Composer: Various
- Lyricist: James S. Gibbons

Audio
- United States Marine Band performance (2009): file; help

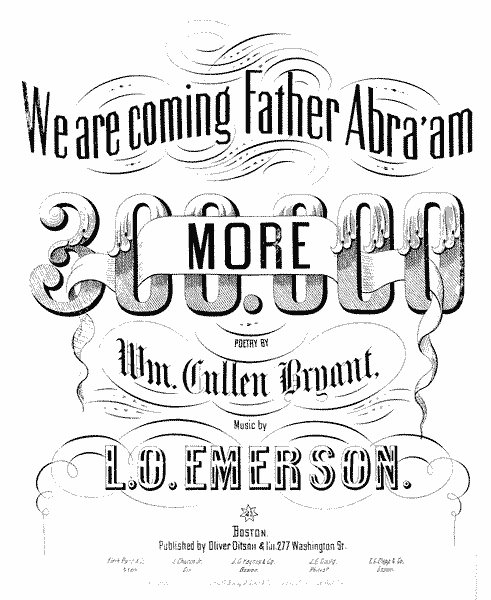
We Are Coming, Father Abra'am, arranged by L.O. Emerson.

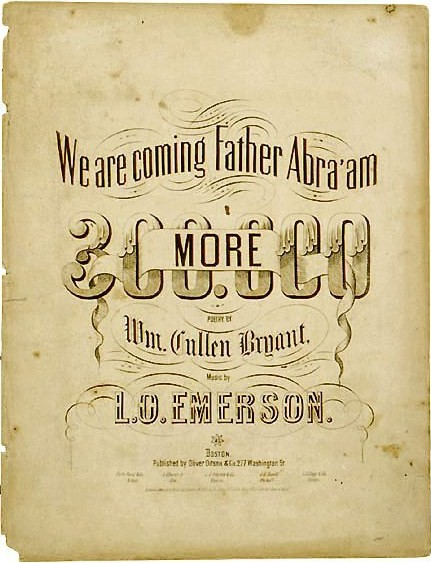
We Are Coming, Father Abra'am, arranged by L.O. Emerson.

"We Are Coming, Father Abra'am", is a poem written by James S. Gibbons, set to music by eight different composers, including Stephen Foster. William Cullen Bryant published one version (with music by Luther Orlando Emerson (1820–1915). Bryant's newspaper originally published the poem and, because it was originally published anonymously, many assumed it was his, and it was widely republished, so Bryant issued a statement denying his authorship. The poem and music came in response to a call by Abraham Lincoln on July 1, 1862 for volunteers to fight for the U.S. in the American Civil War. It was published on the front page of the New York Evening Post soon after, on July 16, 1862.

== Lyrics ==
We are coming, Father Abraham, three hundred thousand more,
From Mississippi's winding stream and from New England's shore.
We leave our plows and workshops, our wives and children dear,
With hearts too full for utterance, with but a silent tear.
We dare not look behind us but steadfastly before.
We are coming, Father Abraham, three hundred thousand more!

We are coming, coming, our Union to restore,
We are coming, Father Abraham, three hundred thousand more!

If you look across the hilltops that meet the northern sky,
Long moving lines of rising dust your vision may descry;
And now the wind, an instant, tears the cloudy veil aside,
And floats aloft our spangled flag in glory and in pride;
And bayonets in the sunlight gleam, and bands brave music pour,
We are coming, father Abr'am, three hundred thousand more!

We are coming, coming, our Union to restore,
We are coming, Father Abraham, three hundred thousand more!

If you look up all our valleys where the growing harvests shine,
You may see our sturdy farmer boys fast forming into line;
And children from their mother's knees are pulling at the weeds,
And learning how to reap and sow against their country's needs;
And a farewell group stands weeping at every cottage door,
We are coming, Father Abr'am, three hundred thousand more!

We are coming, coming, our Union to restore,
We are coming, Father Abraham, three hundred thousand more!

You have called us, and we're coming by Richmond's bloody tide,
To lay us down for freedom's sake, our brothers' bones beside;
Or from foul treason's savage grip, to wrench the murderous blade;
And in the face of foreign foes its fragments to parade.
Six hundred thousand loyal men and true have gone before,
We are coming, Father Abraham, three hundred thousand more!

We are coming, coming, our Union to restore,
We are coming, Father Abraham, three hundred thousand more!

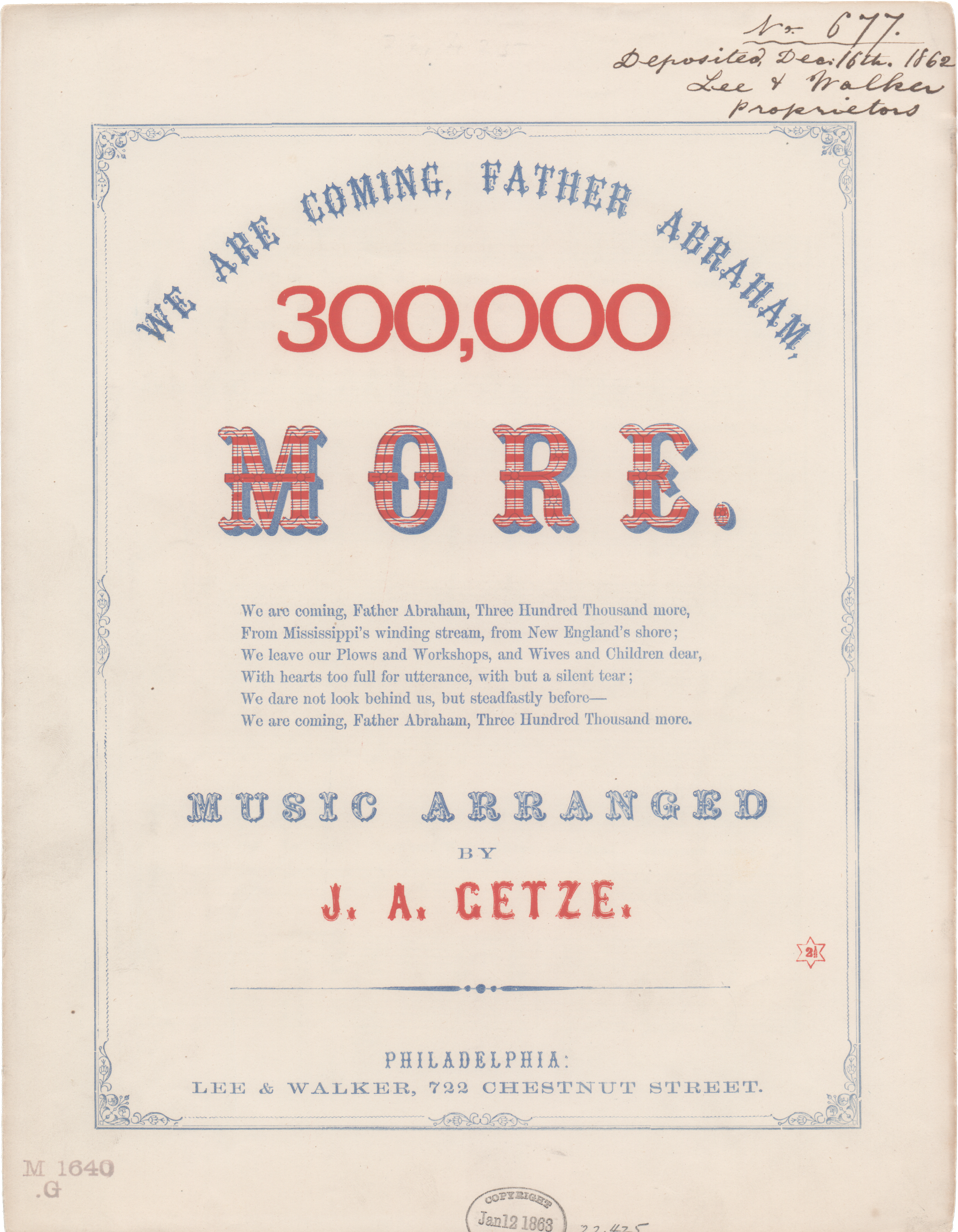
We Are Coming, Father Abra'am, arranged by J.A. Getze.

== Song of the Conscripts ==
A parody of the song, titled Song of the Conscripts, expressed resentment against the 1863 Enrollment Act and particularly its provision for escaping conscription by paying a $300 commutation fee, which only the rich could afford. One verse ran:

We are coming, Father Abraham, three hundred thousand more,
We leave our homes and firesides with bleeding hearts and sore,
Since poverty has been our crime, we bow to thy decree,
We are the poor who have no wealth to purchase liberty.

These lyrics were printed in the New York Copperhead, and copies were distributed at the New York City draft riots.
