= William Gregor =

Cornish clergyman and mineralogist (1761–1817)

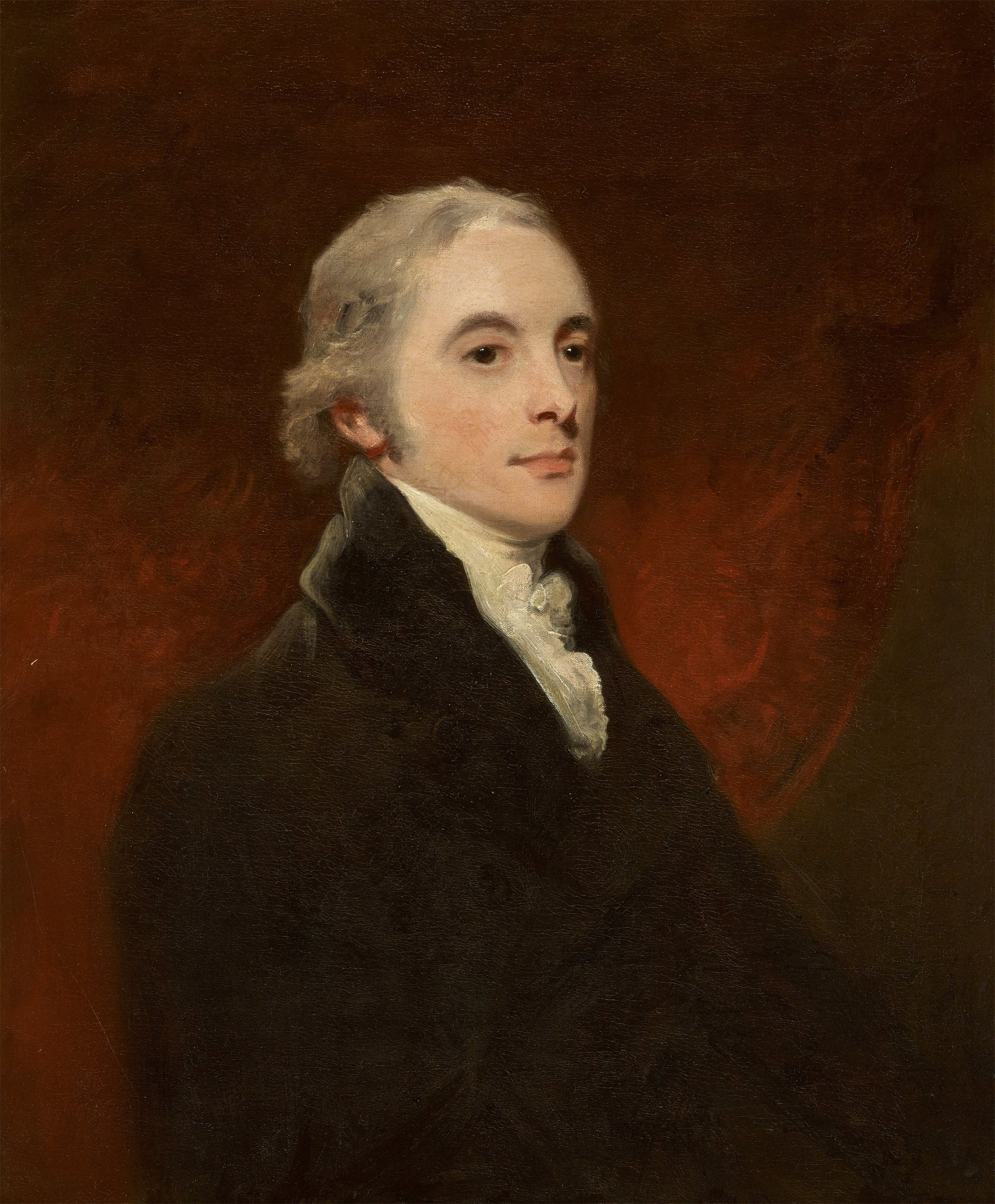
- portrait by John Hoppner
- Born: 25 December 1761; Trewarthenick, Cornwall
- Died: 11 June 1817 (aged 55); Creed, Cornwall, UK
- Education: Bristol Grammar School then St John's College, Cambridge
- Known for: Titanium
- Scientific career
- Fields: Mineralogy

William Gregor (25 December 1761 – 11 June 1817) was a British clergyman and mineralogist who discovered the elemental metal titanium.

== Early years ==
He was born at the Trewarthenick Estate in Cornwall, the son of Francis Gregor and Mary Copley and the brother of Francis Gregor, MP for Cornwall. He was educated at Bristol Grammar School, where he became interested in chemistry, then after two years with a private tutor entered St John's College, Cambridge, graduating BA in 1784 and MA in 1787. He was ordained in the Church of England. He became vicar of St Mary's Church Diptford near Totnes, Devon. He married Charlotte Anne Gwatkin in 1790 and they had one daughter, Charlotte-Anne Gregor.

== Discovery of titanium ==
After a brief interval at Bratton Clovelly, in 1793 William and his family moved permanently to the rectory of Creed in Cornwall. Here he continued his remarkably accurate chemical analysis of minerals, most of which came from Cornwall, such as the zeolites found in gabbro on The Lizard. He also analysed wavellite, tourmaline, and the uranium minerals torbernite and autunite, the arsenate scorodite, the lead mineral mimetite and the nickel mineral niccolite, and others. But he is best known for one of his earliest discoveries: in 1791, while analysing the minerals in a black sand he had discovered in the Manaccan valley, he isolated the calx of an unknown metal which he named manaccanite. Later in 1791, Martin Heinrich Klaproth discovered what is now known as the transition metal, titanium in the mineral rutile. Believing this to be a new discovery, Klaproth named it titanium after the Titans of Greek Mythology, but eventually it was clarified that Gregor made the discovery first. Gregor was credited with the discovery, but the element kept the name chosen by Klaproth. Gregor later found titanium in corundum from Tibet, and in a tourmaline from a local tin mine.

== Death and legacy ==
Gregor was made an honorary member of the Geological Society of London on its inception in 1807, and was a founding member of the Royal Geological Society of Cornwall in 1814. His friends and correspondents included John Hawkins, Philip Rashleigh and John Ayrton Paris. Never letting his scientific work interfere with his pastoral duties, he was also a distinguished landscape painter, etcher and musician. He died of tuberculosis on 11 June 1817 and was buried at nearby Cornelly church.
