= Marius Gueit =

French organist, cellist and composer

Marius André Gueit (2 July 1808 – 2 December 1862) was a 19th-century French organist, cellist and composer.

== Biography ==
The son of a muleteer, Gueit was born in Hyères, France, and lost his sight at the age of 15 months. At first, he was a student of the Institut National des Jeunes Aveugles (INJA) (National Institute for Blind Children or Royal Institution for Blind Youth) in Paris, where he taught from 1826 to 1832. Among the professors who taught at this school were the organists Guillaume Lasceux (1740–1831) and Jean-Nicolas Marrigues (1757–1834).

From 1832 to 1840, Gueit occupied the post of organist of the church of Saint-Paterne of Orléans, succeeding Sébastien Demar (pianist, composer, and organist of German origin, installed in Orléans since 1791, at the organ of Saint-Paterne since 1815). In this same city, Gueit was also a cellist at the musical institute (created in 1834), the predecessor to the modern conservatory.

He then returned to Paris, where he held the organ of the church of Saint-Denis-du-Sacrement and became a teacher at the INJA.

Here he taught the Orleanese organist Henri Victor Tournaillon (1832–1887), who entered the INJA on 16 November 1843.

He died in Paris, aged 54.

== Musical production ==
Gueit published numerous collections for the organ. Some are written for "expressive organ" (the harmonium), a recent instrument, which enjoyed a certain vogue. He also wrote the Trois motets au Saint-Sacrement (three sang Élévations), as well as an Andante & Rondo for cello, avec accompagnement de piano.

There is relatively little organ music from this period, which makes the survival of certain indications of registration, mixed with other more modern elements (or at least "topical") interesting.

== Works currently listed ==
- Six offertoires caractéristiques, for organ (1856) (Paris: Chanvrelin, 1998) (cf. Six Offertoires ... en deux livres, pour l'orgue. Op. 49, Paris: Régnier-Canaux, 1853 and: id., Op. 63 at the BnF).
- Manière de mélanger les jeux de l'orgue précédée d'une introduction qui fait connaître la nature et l'emploi des jeux de l'orgue (Paris: Institution royale des jeunes aveugles, 1830), (copy in Paris, Bibliothèque Mazarine).
- Seven collections that belonged to the Louis Petit Collection (probably an organist) (Bibliothèque nationale de France).

Also at the BnF:

  - Le Souvenir. Nouvelle fantaisie brillante pour le forte-piano, Op. 2 (Paris: Lemoine, n. d.)
  - Les Adieux à la ville d'Hyères. Fantaisie brillante pour le piano-forte, Op. 3 (Paris: Lemoine, n. d.)
  - Un Jour à Honfleur. Romance (Paris, 1855).
  - Sonata for piano and organ, Op. 69 (Paris: Régnier-Canaux, 1857).
  - 20 Morceaux pour Orgue ... pour servir ... aux différents offices ..., Op. 40. Livre 1 (Paris: Veuve Canaux, n. d.)
  - Trois Élévations suivies d'un Offertoire et d'une fugue ... pour orgue ... (Paris: Régnier-Canaux, 1853).
  - L'Écho des Cathédrales. Recueil de 74 morceaux pour l'orgue..., Op. 56 (Paris: Régnier-Canaux, 1853), series 1–7.
  - 1re Suite de la méthode d'orgue transpositeur. 30 antiennes ou versets courts, faciles et chantant, Op. 60 (1854)
  - Douze Versets pour orgue (1857)
  - Trois Motets au St Sacrement, à 2 voix, avec accompagnement d'orgue (Paris: C. Canaux, n. d. [1852]). Contains: O Salutaris, Ave verum corpus, Tantum ergo.
  - O Salutaris à 3 voix d'une exécution facile avec accompagnement d'orgue (Paris, Régnier-Canaux, [1853]).
  - O Salutaris à trois voix avec accompagnement d'orgue (Paris: Régnier Canaux, [1855]).
  - Ave Maria. Solo pour soprano ou ténor (Paris: Régnier-Canaux, 1855).
  - Ave Maria. Duo pour soprano ou ténor (Paris: Régnier-Canaux, 1855).
  - Ave Maria. Solo, duo et chœur avec accompagnement d'orgue (Paris: Régnier-Canaux, 1853).
  - Ave verum. Solo pour soprano ou ténor, avec accompagnement d'orgue (Paris: Régnier-Canaux, 1853).
  - Ave verum. Chœur facile à 2 voix, avec accompagnement d'orgue (Paris, Melle C. Canaux, 1852).
  - Ave verum. Chœur facile à 4 voix, avec accompagnement d'orgue (Paris, Melle C. Canaux, 1853).
  - Tantum ergo for 2 and 3 voices, with organ accompaniment (1855, 1853).
  - Regina coeli à 3 voix, avec accompagnement d'orgue (Paris: Régnier-Canaux, [1856]).

Other locations:

- Méthode d’orgue expressif. Suivie de deux morceaux [...], Op. 30 (Paris: Fourneaux, n. d. [c.1845].
- L’Orgue. Journal des dimanches et des Fêtes, publié sous la direction de L. F. A. FRELON, avec le concours de M.M. A[drien] de LAFAGE [...] MARIUS-GUEIT, [...]: Première partie, plain-chant (Rit. Romain) harmonisé; deuxième partie, morceaux d’orgue faciles et doigtés. Deuxième édition. Première année, etc. (Paris, 1858).
- Marche, published in the Beaux-Arts magazine (Montréal, 1863), T. I, No. 4, p. 28-29.
- Andante & Rondo pour cello, avec accompagnement de piano dédié à son élève Monsieur Jules Landron by A. Marius Gueit (Paris: E. Troupenas).
- O salutaris hostia, for three-part choir (soprano, tenor, bass) and organ. Manuscript, RISM: Marius Gueit

== Discography ==
- Cinq Morceaux pour l’orgue, Op. 34, in: L'Héritage de l'orgue classique, by Jean-Luc Perrot (EMA, 1997).

== Bibliography ==
- Jules BROSSET: Marius Gueit, professeur de musique à l’Institut des Jeunes Aveugles, organiste de l’Eglise Saint-Paterne d’Orléans (Blois: Pigelet, 1905).
- Joël-Marie Fauquet (ed.): Dictionnaire de la musique en France au XIXe siècle (Paris: Fayard, 2003), articles: "Orléans'" by Martine Vincent and "Demar" by Hervé Audéon.
- François Turellier: '"Les Orgues et les organistes de la cathédrale Sainte-Croix d’Orléans. Leur place à l’église et dans la ville, des origines jusqu’aux travaux d’Aristide Cavaillé-Coll", in: L'Orgue, no. 291 (Versailles, Lyon, 2010-III, pp. 3–33.

== See also ==
- Edouard Mignan
