= Ungdom og Galskap =

1806 Danish-language opera by Édouard Du Puy

Ungdom og Galskap (lit. 'Youth and Folly') is an 1806 Danish-language comic opera by Swiss-born composer Édouard Du Puy to his own Danish libretto. Du Puy's work was based on Jean-Nicolas Bouilly's French libretto for Étienne Méhul's 1802 opera Une folie. The opera was created for the Royal Theatre, Copenhagen, after a planned production of Mehul's opera was cancelled.

== Recording ==
- Ungdom og Galskap. Ulrik Cold, Djina Mai-Mai, Peter Grönlund, Guido Paevatalu, Poul Elming, Copenhagen Collegium Musicum, Michael Schønwandt (1997 Dacapo).
