= Henry Worsley (East India Company officer) =

Major-General Sir Henry Worsley, GCB ( 20 January 1768 – 19 January 1841) was a British Army officer who served for most of his career in British India.

== Early life ==
Worsley was born on 20 January 1768 at Appuldurcombe House in the Isle of Wight. He was the second son of Francis Worsley, rector of Chale in the Isle of Wight, by his wife Anne, daughter of Henry Roberts of Standen in the same island.

== Military career ==
In June 1780 he embarked for Bengal as an infantry cadet, and in January 1781 he landed in Madras to take part in the defence of Fort St. George, which was besieged by Haidar Ali. Arriving in Bengal in April, he was promoted ensign and lieutenant in the course of the year, and joined the 2nd European Regiment at Cawnpur. In 1782 he served with the 30th regiment of sepoys in reducing Chait Singh's forts in the neighbourhood of Benares. In the following year he was appointed adjutant, and served with the 1st battalion of his regiment against insurgents in the Káimur Hills. In 1785 the regiment was disbanded in consequence of the general peace, and Worsley was appointed to the 8th regiment of sepoys. Early in 1789 he embarked with a detachment of volunteer sepoys for service in Sumatra. On their return in December the officers and men were honoured with the special approbation and thanks of Lord Cornwallis.

Towards the close of 1791, Worsley volunteered for service in the Mysore war, and was appointed to the 7th battalion Bengal Sepoys. He took part with the centre column in the night attack on Tipú's fortified camp under the walls of Seringapatam on 6 Feb. 1792, and in the subsequent operations against that town. In the following year he was reappointed to the 32nd battalion, and by the regulations of 1796−7 he was posted to the 1st Native Infantry, receiving the brevet rank of captain. During a visit to Europe he was promoted captain-lieutenant and captain on 1 Nov. 1798, and was posted as captain to the 15th Native Infantry, which he joined in 1801. At the close of the year and during 1802 he was employed in command of part of the first battalion in tranquillising the districts ceded by the nawab of Oudh. On 4 Sept. 1803 he fought at Alígarh, and on 11 September he commanded his battalion at the Battle of Delhi. On 10 October he again commanded his battalion in the attack made on the enemy's infantry and guns under the walls of Agra, when he received the thanks of the commander-in-chief, Lord Lake, in general orders. He also led it at the battle of Laswari on 1 Nov. In 1804 he joined the 21st Native Infantry, and on 21 September was promoted to a majority. In command of a detachment he cleared the Doáb of Holkar's troops, which had overrun it after William Monson's reverse, and occupied the city of Muttra, where he was employed in protecting the communication of Lake's army. Without scientific assistance he constructed a bridge of boats over the Jumna at Muttra, which proved of great use to the English force. Lake highly appreciated Worsley's services, and obtained for him the post of deputy adjutant-general. Early in 1806 he succeeded to the office of adjutant-general with the official rank of lieutenant-colonel. On 29 Nov. 1809 he attained the regimental rank of lieutenant-colonel, but in the beginning of 1810 ill-health compelled him to resign his office, and in 1811 he proceeded to Europe on furlough. In 1813 he accepted the post of principal private secretary to the governor-general, Francis Rawdon Hastings, 2nd Earl of Moira (and afterwards Marquis of Hastings). His health compelled him to resign this post almost immediately; but in 1818 he returned to India, and Moira at once appointed him military secretary. In a few months he was obliged to resign from the same cause as before, and joined his corps in the vain hope of restoring his health by active service. In 1819 he returned finally to England. On 12 Aug. he attained the brevet rank of colonel, and in August 1822 the rank of colonel with the command of a regiment. Worsley became major-general in retirement on 24 Aug. 1830.

He died at Shide on the Isle of Wight on 19 January 1841, and was buried at Chale.

He married Sarah Hastings, and had one daughter, Elizabeth.

== Honours ==
On 4 June 1815, Worsley was appointed a Companion of the Order of the Bath (CB). On 26 September 1821, he was promoted to Knight Commander of the Order of the Bath (KCB) and therefore granted the title sir. On 16 February 1838, he was promoted to Knight Grand Cross of the Order of the Bath (GCB), the highest grade of the order.
