= Archer Thompson Gurney =

British clergyman

Archer Thompson Gurney (1820–1887) was a Church of England clergyman and hymnodist.

== Life ==
Archer Gurney was born at Tregony in Cornwall on 15 July 1820. His father, Richard Gurney, was vice-warden of the stannaries of Devon. Archer Thompson Gurney became a student of the Middle Temple on 29 April 1842, and was called to the bar, 8 May 1846. He was a Conservative candidate for the Lambeth constituency at the 1847 general election, but withdrew before the poll. His connection with the bar was of short duration, as in 1849 he was ordained to the curacy of Holy Trinity, Exeter. In 1851 he took charge of St Mary's, Crown Street, Soho, London, where he remained until 1854, when he obtained the senior curacy of Buckingham. He was appointed chaplain to the Court Chapel, Paris, in 1858, and resided in that city till 1871. After his return to England he served as evening lecturer of Holy Trinity Church, Westminster, from 1872 to 1874, as curate of Holy Trinity Chapel, Brighton, 1874–5, as curate in charge of St Andrew's, Hastings, 1877–8, assisted at St Katharine's Hospital, Regent's Park, London, 1879–80, was curate in charge of Rhayader, Radnorshire, 1880–1, and was curate in charge of Llangunider, Brecon, 1882–3. He afterwards resided at 7 Keble Terrace, Oxford, and died of disease of the kidneys at the Castle hotel, 4 Northgate Street, Bath, 21 March 1887.

He was known as a poet and a theologian, and his work entitled Words of Faith and Cheer, 1874, obtained a well-deserved popularity.

His daughter-in-law, Dorothy Frances Gurney, née Blomfield, married to his son Gerald, was also a hymn writer.

== Works ==
He was the author or translator of the following:

1. Turandot, Princess of China, a drama from the German of Schiller, with alterations, 1836.
2. Faust, a Tragedy. Part the Second, 1842.
3. Alboin. A Play in 5 Acts, 1845 (unpublished ms in British Library)
4. King Charles the First, a dramatic poem, 1846.
5. Love's Legends, poems, 1845.
6. Poems, Spring, 1853.
7. March and April Ditties, 1853.
8. A Satire for the Age, The Transcendentalists, 1853; 2nd ed. 1855.
9. Songs of the Present, 1854; 3rd ed. 1856.
10. Iphigenia at Delphi, a tragedy, 1855; new ed. 1860.
11. The Ode of Peace, 1855.
12. Songs of Early Summer, 1856.
13. Absolution, its Use and Abuse, and Excommunication, 1858.
14. Poems, 1860.
15. Sermons Anglicans prononcés à Paris, 1860.
16. Restoration, or the Completion of the Reformation, 1861; 2nd ed. 1862.
17. A Letter of Entreaty to the Rev. Dr. Pusey, 1864.
18. Faith against Freethinkers, 1864.
19. On Recent Propositions and the Prospect of Reunion, a letter to the Bishop of Oxford, 1866.
20. Letter to a Friend on Obedience to Law, and to the Bishop, 1873.
21. Words of Faith and Cheer, a Mission of Instruction and Suggestion, 1874.
22. Parables and Meditations for Sundays and Holy-days, 1874.
23. First Principles in Church and State, 1875.

He also wrote the words for Horsley's Gideon, an oratorio, 1859, several songs which were set to music, many hymns in Shipley's Lyra Eucharistica, 1864, and the hymn commencing Come ye lofty, come ye lowly in Philip Schaff's Christ in Song, 1870. He wrote in the Theologian, English Review, Fortnightly Review, Churchman's Family Magazine, Macmillan's Magazine and The Spectator.
