= Cosmopterix zathea =

Scientific classification
- Kingdom: Animalia
- Phylum: Arthropoda
- Class: Insecta
- Order: Lepidoptera
- Family: Cosmopterigidae
- Genus: Cosmopterix
- Species: C. zathea

Binomial name
- Cosmopterix zathea Meyrick, 1917

Synonyms
- Cosmopteryx zathea

Species of moth

Cosmopterix zathea is a moth in the family Cosmopterigidae. It is found in India (Coorg).
