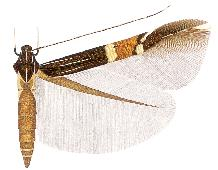

Scientific classification
- Kingdom: Animalia
- Phylum: Arthropoda
- Clade: Pancrustacea
- Class: Insecta
- Order: Lepidoptera
- Family: Cosmopterigidae
- Genus: Cosmopterix
- Species: C. karsholti

Binomial name
- Cosmopterix karsholti Koster, 2010

= Cosmopterix karsholti =

Species of moth

Cosmopterix karsholti is a moth of the family Cosmopterigidae. It is known from Peru.

Adults have been recorded in March.

== Description ==
Male. Forewing length 4.2 mm. Head: frons shining creamy white with greenish and reddish reflections, vertex and neck tufts shining dark brown with reddish gloss, medially and laterally lined white, median line hardly visible, collar shining dark brown; labial palpus first segment very short, white, second segment four-fifths of the length of third, dark brown with white longitudinal lines laterally and ventrally, third segment white, lined brown laterally; scape dorsally dark brown with a white anterior line, ventrally white, antenna shining dark brown with a white line from base to two-thirds, interrupted beyond one-half, followed towards apex by two white segments separated by one brown segment, three dark brown, two white, ten dark brown, four white and two or three dark brown segments at apex. Thorax and tegulae shining dark brown with reddish gloss, thorax with a white median line in posterior half, tegulae lined white inwardly. Legs: shining dark brown with reddish gloss, femora of midleg and hindleg shining pale ochreous, foreleg with a white line on tibia and tarsal segments one and two, segment three basally and segment five entirely white, tibia of midleg with white narrow oblique basal and medial lines and a white apical ring, tarsal segments one and two with white apical rings, segment five entirely white, tibia of hindleg as midleg, tarsal segment one with ochreous basal and apical rings, segments two and three with ochreous apical rings, segments four and five entirely ochreous-white, spurs shining white dorsally, dark brown ventrally. Forewing shining dark brown with reddish gloss, four narrow white lines in the basal area, a subcostal from base to one-quarter and bending from costa, a medial above fold, from one-eighth to one-third, a subdorsal similar to the medial, but slightly shorter distally, a dorsal from beyond base to one-fifth, an orange-brown transverse fascia beyond the middle, narrowed towards dorsum, bordered at the inner edge by a tubercular pale golden metallic fascia with a small subcostal patch of blackish scales on the outside, bordered at the outer edge by two tubercular pale golden metallic costal and dorsal spots, the dorsal spot more than twice as large as the costal and more towards base, both spots irregularly lined dark brown on the inside, a white costal streak from the costal spot, a shining bluish white apical line, interrupted in middle, followed by a broad shining white spot in the apical cilia, cilia dark brown, paler towards dorsum. Hindwing shining greyish brown, cilia brown. Underside: forewing shining greyish brown, the white costal streak and apical spot distinctly visible, hindwing shining greyish brown. Abdomen dorsally brown with slight greenish and reddish reflections, segments five and six banded paler posteriorly, ventrally shining dark grey with segments banded whitish posteriorly, anal tuft brown.

== Etymology ==
The species is dedicated to Mr. Ole Karsholt, Copenhagen, Denmark, as collector of this species.
