= Cosmopterix holophracta =

Scientific classification
- Kingdom: Animalia
- Phylum: Arthropoda
- Class: Insecta
- Order: Lepidoptera
- Family: Cosmopterigidae
- Genus: Cosmopterix
- Species: C. holophracta

Binomial name
- Cosmopterix holophracta Meyrick, 1909

Synonyms
- Cosmopteryx holophracta

Species of moth

Cosmopterix holophracta is a moth in the family Cosmopterigidae. It was described by Edward Meyrick in 1909. It is found in India.
