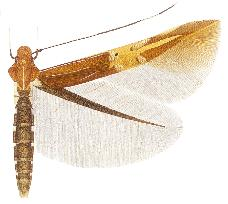

Scientific classification
- Kingdom: Animalia
- Phylum: Arthropoda
- Clade: Pancrustacea
- Class: Insecta
- Order: Lepidoptera
- Family: Cosmopterigidae
- Genus: Cosmopterix
- Species: C. nishidai

Binomial name
- Cosmopterix nishidai Koster, 2010

= Cosmopterix nishidai =

Species of moth

Cosmopterix nishidai is a moth of the family Cosmopterigidae. It is known from Costa Rica.

Adults have been recorded in October and December, as well as in March and April. This species is likely bivoltine.

== Description ==
Male, female. Wingspan 9.5-9.8 mm. Head: frons shining ochreous with greenish and reddish reflections, vertex and neck tufts shining olive brown with reddish reflection, collar olive brown; labial palpus first segment very short, white, second segment four-fifths of the length of third, dark brown with white longitudinal lines laterally and ventrally, third segment white, lined dark brown laterally, extreme apex white; scape dark brown with a white anterior line, white ventrally, antenna shining dark brown with a white line from base to two-thirds, this line beyond one third with several interruptions, followed towards apex by eight dark brown segments, ten white or partly white, twelve dark brown and three white segments at apex. Thorax and tegulae shining olive brown with reddish and greenish gloss, thorax with white median line. Legs: shining olive brown, forelegs dark brown dorsally, femora of midleg and hindleg shining creamy white, foreleg with a white line on tibia and tarsal segments one and five, segment two and three with white dorsal spots, tibia of midleg with narrow white oblique basal and medial streaks and a white apical ring, tarsal segments dark brown with white apical spots on segments one to three, segment five entirely white, tibia of hindleg as midleg, but the hair pencils posteriorly to the medial streak and the apical ring large and distinctly blackish brown, tarsal segments one and two dark greyish brown, segment three dark greyish brown in basal half, ochreous-grey in apical half, segments four and five white dorsally, ochreous-grey ventrally, spurs ochreous-white dorsally, dark grey ventrally. Forewing shining greyish brown with reddish gloss, costal half from base to the transverse fascia olive brown, five very narrow lines in the basal area, a yellowish costal from one-fifth to the transverse fascia, a subcostal from base almost to the transverse fascia and interrupted at two-thirds of its length, a medial above fold, almost from base to the interruption of the subcostal, a short and oblique subdorsal from one-quarter to two-fifths, the latter three lines silvery white with bluish and purplish reflections, a dirty yellow transverse fascia beyond the middle with a short basal protrusion and a very long apical protrusion, bordered at the inner edge by two tubercular pale pinkish golden metallic costal and dorsal spots, the costal spot one and a half times as large as the dorsal, slightly more towards base and with patch of blackish scales on outside, bordered at the outer edge by two similarly coloured costal and dorsal spots, the costal spot more than twice as large as the dorsal, both spots opposite and weakly lined brown inwardly, a yellowish costal streak beyond the outer costal spot, an indistinct dirty yellow apical line from below the tip of the apical protrusion, cilia olive brown, greyish brown towards dorsum. Hindwing shining dark greyish brown with greenish and reddish reflections, cilia greyish brown. Underside: forewing shining greyish brown, the yellowish apical line distinctly visible, hindwing shining greyish-brown, tip ochreous. Abdomen dorsally shining dark brown with greenish and reddish reflections, segments five and six banded paler posteriorly, laterally dark brown, ventrally shining ochreous with segments banded shining white posteriorly, anal tuft pale ochreous-grey dorsally, white ventrally brown. In the male the very long valvae and pleural lobes of segment VIII make up more than one quarter of the total length of the abdomen.

== Biology ==
The larvae feed on Ipomoea neei. They mine the leaves of their host plant. The larva makes an irregular blotch mine that is often changed for a new one. Between the two leaf mines the larva creates a path of silk to travel between these mines. The frass is partly ejected from the mine and partly deposited inside. Although next to the food plant, Ipomoea santillanii also occurred, no leaf mines were found on that plant. Adults have been collected in May.

== Etymology ==
The species is dedicated to Mr. Kenji Nishida, San José, Costa Rica, who collected and reared the species.
