= Cosmopterix zenobia =

Scientific classification
- Kingdom: Animalia
- Phylum: Arthropoda
- Class: Insecta
- Order: Lepidoptera
- Family: Cosmopterigidae
- Genus: Cosmopterix
- Species: C. zenobia

Binomial name
- Cosmopterix zenobia Meyrick, 1921

Synonyms
- Cosmopteryx zenobia

Species of moth

Cosmopterix zenobia is a moth in the family Cosmopterigidae. It is found on Java.
