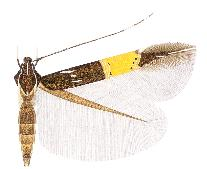

Scientific classification
- Kingdom: Animalia
- Phylum: Arthropoda
- Clade: Pancrustacea
- Class: Insecta
- Order: Lepidoptera
- Family: Cosmopterigidae
- Genus: Cosmopterix
- Species: C. ganymedes

Binomial name
- Cosmopterix ganymedes Koster, 2010

= Cosmopterix ganymedes =

Species of moth

Cosmopterix ganymedes is a moth of the family Cosmopterigidae. It is known from Argentina (Salta) and Brazil (Goiás).

Adults were collected in April and May.

== Description ==
Male. Forewing length 3.7-4.1 mm. Head: frons shining silvery grey, vertex and neck tufts shining dark brown with reddish gloss, laterally and medially lined white, collar shining dark brown; labial palpus first segment very short, white, second segment four-fifths of the length of third, dark brown with white longitudinal lines laterally and ventrally, third segment white, lined dark brown laterally; scape dorsally shining dark brown with a white anterior line, ventrally shining white, antenna shining dark brown with a white interrupted line from base to beyond one half, basal and distal part of this line uninterrupted for approximately five segments, followed towards apex by eight dark brown segments, seven white, eight dark brown, three white, three dark brown and one white segment at apex. Thorax and tegulae shining dark brown with reddish gloss, thorax with a whitish posterior spot, tegulae lined white inwardly Legs: shining dark brown, foreleg with a white line on tibia and tarsal segments one, two and five, tibia of midleg with white oblique basal and medial lines and a white apical ring, tarsal segments one, two and four with white apical rings, segment five entirely white, tibia of hindleg as midleg, tarsal segments one, two and three with white apical rings, segments four and five entirely white, spurs dark brown, inwardly white. Forewing shining dark brown with reddish gloss, three short silvery white streaks in the basal area, a subcostal from one-eighth to one-fifth and bending from costa distally, a very short medial, ending at end of the subcostal, a subdorsal, twice as long as the medial, and starting where the medial does or slightly beyond it, a bright yellow transverse fascia beyond the middle, narrowed towards dorsum, bordered by an inner and an outer tubercular golden metallic fascia, the inner fascia outwardly with two small spots of blackish scales subcostally and subdorsally, the outer fascia inwardly with three similar spots and sometimes narrowly divided in middle, a white costal streak from the outer fascia, inwardly edged brown, a narrow silvery white apical line in the distal half of the apical area, interrupted in middle and shining white in the cilia, cilia dark brown. Hindwing shining brown with reddish gloss, cilia brown. Underside: forewing shining dark greyish brown, the white costal streak and the white streak in the cilia distinctly visible, hindwing shining dark greyish brown. Abdomen dorsally shining brown, segments three to five more ochreous, ventrally shining dark grey, segments broadly banded silvery white posteriorly, anal tuft dark greyish brown.

== Etymology ==
The species is named after Ganymede, a moon of Jupiter. To be treated as a noun in apposition.
