= Cosmopterix phaeogastra =

Scientific classification
- Kingdom: Animalia
- Phylum: Arthropoda
- Class: Insecta
- Order: Lepidoptera
- Family: Cosmopterigidae
- Genus: Cosmopterix
- Species: C. phaeogastra

Binomial name
- Cosmopterix phaeogastra Meyrick, 1917

Synonyms
- Cosmopteryx phaeogastra

Species of moth

Cosmopterix phaeogastra is a moth in the family Cosmopterigidae. It is found in India.
