= Cosmopterix flava =

Scientific classification
- Kingdom: Animalia
- Phylum: Arthropoda
- Clade: Pancrustacea
- Class: Insecta
- Order: Lepidoptera
- Family: Cosmopterigidae
- Genus: Cosmopterix
- Species: C. flava

Binomial name
- Cosmopterix flava Sinev, 1986

Species of moth

Cosmopterix flava is a moth in the family Cosmopterigidae. It was described by Sinev in 1986.
