= Cosmopterix cognita =

Scientific classification
- Domain: Eukaryota
- Kingdom: Animalia
- Phylum: Arthropoda
- Class: Insecta
- Order: Lepidoptera
- Family: Cosmopterigidae
- Genus: Cosmopterix
- Species: C. cognita

Binomial name
- Cosmopterix cognita Walsingham, 1891

Species of moth

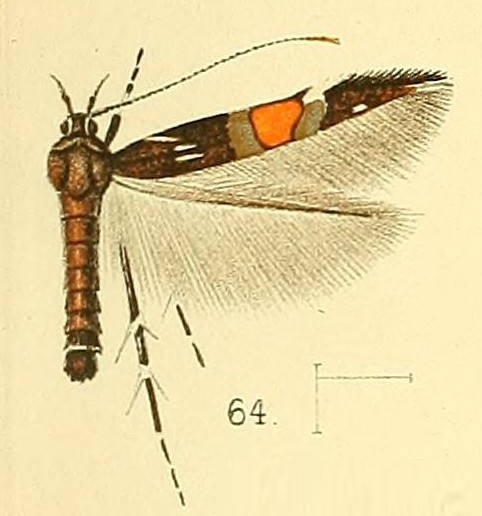
Cosmopterix cognita

Cosmopterix cognita is a moth in the family Cosmopterigidae. It was described by Walsingham in 1891. It is found in South Africa.
