= Cosmopterix panayella =

Scientific classification
- Kingdom: Animalia
- Phylum: Arthropoda
- Clade: Pancrustacea
- Class: Insecta
- Order: Lepidoptera
- Family: Cosmopterigidae
- Genus: Cosmopterix
- Species: C. panayella

Binomial name
- Cosmopterix panayella Mey, 1998

Species of moth

Cosmopterix panayella is a moth in the family Cosmopterigidae. It is found on the island of Panay in the Philippines.
