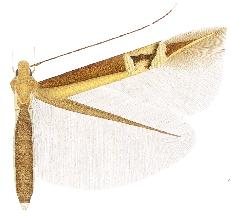

Scientific classification
- Kingdom: Animalia
- Phylum: Arthropoda
- Clade: Pancrustacea
- Class: Insecta
- Order: Lepidoptera
- Family: Cosmopterigidae
- Genus: Cosmopterix
- Species: C. sinelinea

Binomial name
- Cosmopterix sinelinea Hodges, 1978

= Cosmopterix sinelinea =

Species of moth

Cosmopterix sinelinea is a moth of the family Cosmopterigidae. It is known from South Carolina, United States.

Adults have been recorded in August.

== Description ==
Male, female. Forewing length 4.8 mm. Head: frons shining ochreous with greenish and reddish reflections, vertex, neck tufts and collar shining pale bronze brown with strong golden gloss and greenish reflection; labial palpus, first segment very short, white, second segment three-quarters of the length of third, grey with white longitudinal lines laterally and ventrally, third segment white, lined dark greyish brown laterally; scape dark bronze brown with a white anterior line, ventrally white, antenna dark bronze brown, beyond two-thirds a white ring of two segments, followed towards apex by fourteen dark bronze brown and five white segments at apex. Thorax and tegulae shining pale bronze brown with strong golden gloss and greenish reflection. Legs: dark grey, foreleg with a white line on tibia and tarsal segments one, two and five, segment three white in basal half, tibia of midleg with an oblique indistinct white dorsal line in the basal half and a white apical ring, tarsal segment one dorsally whitish, segment five entirely white, tibia of hindleg with white oblique basal and medial lines and a white apical ring, tarsal segment one dorsally whitish and with a white apical ring, segment two with a white apical ring, segment five entirely white, spurs white dorsally, dark grey ventrally. Forewing above fold and in the apical area shining bronze brown with a strong reddish golden gloss, below fold shining pale golden with greenish and reddish reflections, a pale yellow transverse fascia beyond the middle, narrowing towards dorsum, bordered at the inner edge by a pale golden metallic fascia, perpendicular at dorsum, bordered at the outer edge by a broad, slightly outward oblique similarly coloured fascia, widest on dorsum, both fasciae with some pale reddish reflection, in the middle of the transverse fascia a broad blackish-brown streak with strong reddish gloss, the inner fascia with some irregular dark grey or blackish brown lining on the outside, the outer fascia lined blackish brown on the inside, the outer fascia costally edged by a short and narrow white costal streak, the apical line as a pale golden metallic streak on dorsum of the apical area and ending just before apex, cilia bronze brown around apex, paler towards base, hindwing brownish grey with greenish gloss, cilia greyish brown. Underside: forewing shining greyish brown, hindwing brownish grey. Abdomen shining brown, laterally shining grey with greenish reflection, ventrally yellowish white, anal tuft whitish, mixed grey.
