= Cosmopterix bambusae =

Scientific classification
- Kingdom: Animalia
- Phylum: Arthropoda
- Class: Insecta
- Order: Lepidoptera
- Family: Cosmopterigidae
- Genus: Cosmopterix
- Species: C. bambusae

Binomial name
- Cosmopterix bambusae (Meyrick, 1912)

Synonyms
- Cosmopteryx bambusae Meyrick, 1912

Species of moth

Cosmopterix bambusae is a moth of the family Cosmopterigidae. It is known from India.
