= Cosmopterix macrula =

Scientific classification
- Kingdom: Animalia
- Phylum: Arthropoda
- Clade: Pancrustacea
- Class: Insecta
- Order: Lepidoptera
- Family: Cosmopterigidae
- Genus: Cosmopterix
- Species: C. macrula

Binomial name
- Cosmopterix macrula (Meyrick, 1897)

Synonyms
- Cosmopteryx macrula Meyrick, 1897

Species of moth

Cosmopterix macrula is a moth of the family Cosmopterigidae. It is known from Australia.
