= Cosmopterix sichuanella =

Scientific classification
- Kingdom: Animalia
- Phylum: Arthropoda
- Clade: Pancrustacea
- Class: Insecta
- Order: Lepidoptera
- Family: Cosmopterigidae
- Genus: Cosmopterix
- Species: C. sichuanella

Binomial name
- Cosmopterix sichuanella Kuroko & Y.Q. Liu, 2005

Species of moth

Cosmopterix sichuanella is a moth of the family Cosmopterigidae. It is known from Jiangxi and Sichuan in China.

The length of the forewings is about 4.6 mm (male holotype).
