= Cosmopterix argentitegulella =

Scientific classification
- Kingdom: Animalia
- Phylum: Arthropoda
- Clade: Pancrustacea
- Class: Insecta
- Order: Lepidoptera
- Family: Cosmopterigidae
- Genus: Cosmopterix
- Species: C. argentitegulella

Binomial name
- Cosmopterix argentitegulella Sinev, 1985

Species of moth from Russia and China

Cosmopterix argentitegulella is a moth of the family Cosmopterigidae. It is known from Russian Far East (Amur and Primorye regions) and Jiangxi, China.

The length of the forewings is about 6 mm.
