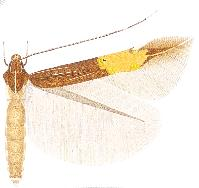

Scientific classification
- Kingdom: Animalia
- Phylum: Arthropoda
- Class: Insecta
- Order: Lepidoptera
- Family: Cosmopterigidae
- Genus: Cosmopterix
- Species: C. xanthura

Binomial name
- Cosmopterix xanthura Walsingham, 1909

= Cosmopterix xanthura =

Species of moth

Cosmopterix xanthura is a moth of the family Cosmopterigidae. It is known from Mexico (Tabasco). Adults have been recorded in March.

== Description ==
Cosmopterix xanthura has a forewing length of 3.3 to 3.9 mm.

=== Head ===
Frons shining white with greenish reflection, vertex and neck tufts shining greyish brown with reddish gloss, laterally and medially lined white, collar shining greyish brown; labial palpus first segment very short, white, second segment four-fifths of the length of third, dark brown with white longitudinal lines laterally and ventrally, third segment white, lined brown laterally, extreme apex white; scape dorsally shining dark brown with white anterior line, ventrally shining white, antenna shining dark brown, with a white line from base to beyond one-half, followed towards apex by one white segment, three dark brown, ten more or less white, ten dark brown and seven white segments at apex. Thorax and tegulae shining greyish brown with reddish gloss, thorax with a white median line.

=== Legs ===
Shining dark greyish brown, femora of midleg and hindleg shining ochreous-white, foreleg with a white line on tibia and tarsal segments, interrupted at segment four, tibia of midleg with white narrow, oblique basal and medial lines and a white apical ring, tarsal segment one with a longitudinal white line, segments two and four with white apical rings, segment five entirely white, tibia of hindleg with white medial and apical rings, tarsal segment one with white basal and apical rings, tarsal segment two with white apical ring, tarsal segments three to five entirely white, spurs white dorsally, brown ventrally. Forewing shining greyish brown, three narrow white lines in the basal area, a subcostal from base to one-quarter, distally slightly bending from costa, a medial from one-seventh to one-third and just above fold, an oblique subdorsal from one-quarter almost to the transverse fascia, a dark yellow transverse fascia beyond the middle with a broad prolongation towards apex and a long and narrow apical protrusion in middle, bordered at the inner edge by two tubercular pale golden metallic subcostal and dorsal spots, the subcostal spot with a patch of blackish scales on the outside and the dorsal spot further from base as the subcostal, beyond the middle of transverse fascia two tubercular pale golden costal and dorsal spots, the dorsal spot twice as large than the costal and more towards base, a greyish brown edged, white costal streak from the outer costal spot, a shining white apical line from the apical protrusion to apex, cilia greyish brown at apex, ochreous-brown towards dorsum. Hindwing shining brownish grey, cilia ochreous-brown.

=== Underside ===
Forewing shining greyish brown, the transverse fascia and the apical line indistinctly visible, hindwing shining brownish grey. Abdomen dorsally yellowish brown, segments whitish edged laterally, segment seven whitish edged posteriorly, ventrally shining dark grey, segments banded shining white posteriorly and with a broad shining yellowish white longitudinal streak, anal tuft yellowish white, dorsally yellowish brown in female.
