= Cosmopterix pustulatella =

Scientific classification
- Kingdom: Animalia
- Phylum: Arthropoda
- Class: Insecta
- Order: Lepidoptera
- Family: Cosmopterigidae
- Genus: Cosmopterix
- Species: C. pustulatella

Binomial name
- Cosmopterix pustulatella Snellen, 1897

Synonyms
- Cosmopteryx pustulatella

Species of moth

Cosmopterix pustulatella is a moth in the family Cosmopterigidae. It is found on Java.
