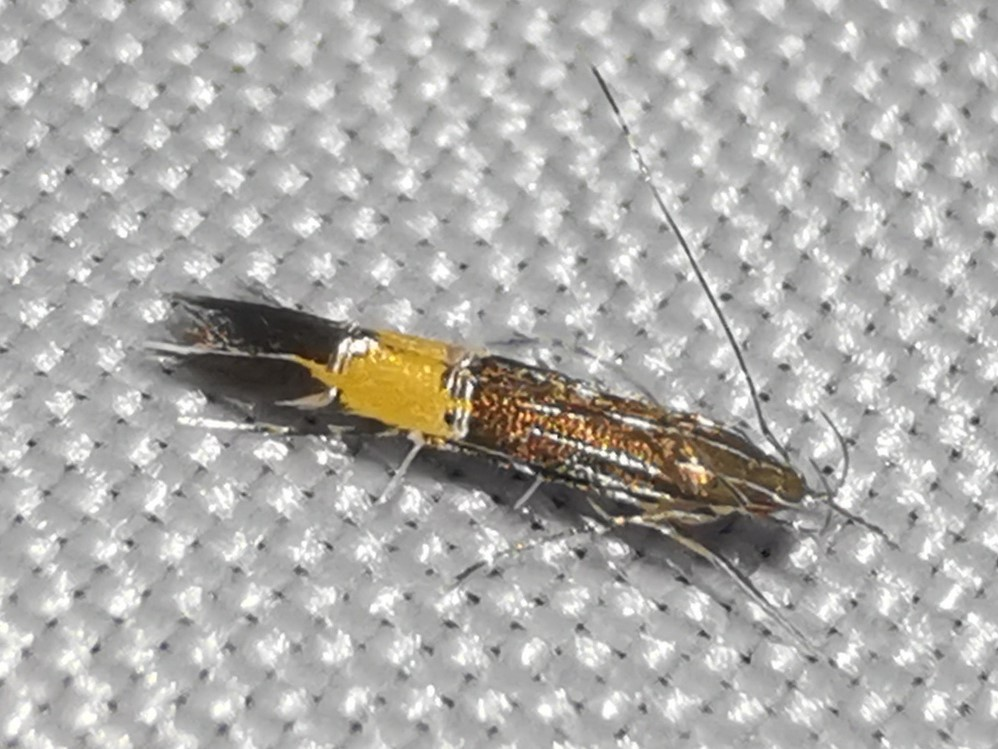

Scientific classification
- Kingdom: Animalia
- Phylum: Arthropoda
- Class: Insecta
- Order: Lepidoptera
- Family: Cosmopterigidae
- Genus: Cosmopterix
- Species: C. longilineata

Binomial name
- Cosmopterix longilineata Kuroko, 1987

= Cosmopterix longilineata =

Species of moth

Cosmopterix longilineata is a species of moth in the family Cosmopterigidae. It is known from Thailand.
