= Cosmopterix paltophanes =

Scientific classification
- Kingdom: Animalia
- Phylum: Arthropoda
- Class: Insecta
- Order: Lepidoptera
- Family: Cosmopterigidae
- Genus: Cosmopterix
- Species: C. paltophanes

Binomial name
- Cosmopterix paltophanes Meyrick, 1909

Synonyms
- Cosmopteryx paltophanes

Species of moth

Cosmopterix paltophanes is a moth in the family Cosmopterigidae. It is found in India.
