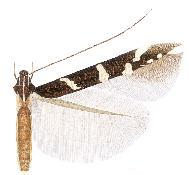

Scientific classification
- Domain: Eukaryota
- Kingdom: Animalia
- Phylum: Arthropoda
- Class: Insecta
- Order: Lepidoptera
- Family: Cosmopterigidae
- Genus: Cosmopterix
- Species: C. abnormalis

Binomial name
- Cosmopterix abnormalis Walsingham, 1897

Synonyms
- Cosmopterix asteria

= Cosmopterix abnormalis =

Species of moth from the Caribbean

Cosmopterix abnormalis is a moth of the family Cosmopterigidae. It is known from the Cayman Islands, Haiti and Jamaica.

Adults were collected between December and May, and again in August.

== Description ==
Male, female. Forewing length 2.9-3.1 mm. Head: frons shining greyish white with greenish and reddish reflections, vertex and neck tufts shining dark bronze brown, laterally and medially lined white, collar shining dark bronze brown; labial palpus first segment very short, white, second segment three-quarters the length of third, dark brown with white longitudinal lines laterally and ventrally, third segment white, lined dark brown laterally; scape dorsally dark brown with a white anterior line, ventrally white, antenna shining dark brown with an interrupted white line from base to two-thirds with an uninterrupted section at base, followed towards apex by four to six dark brown segments, two white, two brown, two white, ten brown, six white and one brown segment at apex. Thorax and tegulae shining dark brown with reddish gloss, thorax with a white median line. Legs: shining dark greyish brown, foreleg with a white line on tibia and tarsal segments one, two and four, femora of midleg and hindleg shining pale golden brown, femur of the midleg with purplish reflection, tibiae of the midleg and the hindleg with white oblique basal and medial lines and white apical rings, tarsal segments one, two and four of the midleg with white apical rings or dorsal streaks, tarsal segments one to four of the hindleg with white or ochreous apical rings and segment five entirely white or ochreous, spurs dark brownish grey, inner sides lighter. Forewing shining dark brown with reddish gloss, in the basal area at one-fifth an irregular inwardly oblique silver or pale golden metallic fascia, not reaching dorsum and narrowed in the middle, a narrow white dorsal line from base to one quarter, a broad tubercular silver or pale golden metallic fascia before one-half, perpendicular at dorsum, on dorsum at three-fifths a tubercular silver or pale golden spot to three-quarters of the width of the wing, a similar but smaller spot on costa at threequarters, outwardly edged by a narrow white costal streak, the apical line reduced to two or three silver or pale golden spots and a broad white spot in the cilia at apex, cilia dark brown around apex, paler on dorsum towards base. Hindwing shining dark greyish brown, cilia greyish brown. Underside: forewing shining dark brown with the white costal streak and apical line distinctly visible, hindwing greyish brown, a short whitish streak on dorsum at base. Abdomen dorsally shining dark brown with reddish gloss, segments four to seven banded dark grey posteriorly, laterally shining golden, ventrally dark greyish brown with strong golden reflection, anal tuft ochreous-white. Abdomen in female dorsally shining bronze brown, segments four to six banded bronze grey posteriorly, ventrally shining bronze, segments broadly banded silvery posteriorly, anal tuft brownish grey.
