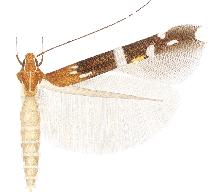

Scientific classification
- Kingdom: Animalia
- Phylum: Arthropoda
- Class: Insecta
- Order: Lepidoptera
- Family: Cosmopterigidae
- Genus: Cosmopterix
- Species: C. irrubricata

Binomial name
- Cosmopterix irrubricata Walsingham, 1909

= Cosmopterix irrubricata =

Species of moth

Cosmopterix irrubricata is a moth of the family Cosmopterigidae. It is known from Jamaica and Veracruz, Mexico.

Adults have been recorded in March and April.

== Description ==
Male, female. Forewing length 3.5 3.7 mm. Head: frons shining greyish white with reddish reflection, vertex and neck tufts shining bronze brown with reddish reflection, laterally lined white, collar shining bronze brown; labial palpus first segment very short, greyish white, second segment three-quarters of the length of third, dark brown with white longitudinal lines laterally and ventrally, third segment white, lined brown laterally, extreme apex white; scape dorsally dark brown with a white anterior line, ventrally white, antenna shining dark brown with a white interrupted line from base to two-fifths, at base a short uninterrupted section, followed towards apex by a dark brown section, two white segments, two dark brown, two white and ten dark brown segments at apex. Thorax and tegulae shining bronze brown with reddish gloss, thorax with a white median line. Legs: shining dark brown, foreleg with a white line on tibia and tarsal segments one and two, segment four with a white apical ring, segment five entirely white, tibia of midleg with white oblique basal and medial lines and a white apical ring, tarsal segments one, two and four with white apical rings, segment five dorsally white, tibia of hindleg with a pale golden metallic basal streak and pale golden metallic medial and subapical rings, and a white apical ring, tarsal segments one to three with white apical rings, segment four and five entirely white, spurs dark brown, apically lighter. Forewing with basal one-fifth shining bronze brown with reddish gloss, remaining part shining dark brown with reddish gloss, at one-fifth three short silver metallic streaks with bluish reflection, a subcostal, a medial just above fold and more towards base than the subcostal, a subdorsal, further from base and twice as long as the subcostal and the medial, a broad tubercular silver metallic fascia with violet reflection in the middle, perpendicular on dorsum, at three-fifths a tubercular silver metallic dorsal spot with violet reflection, a similarly coloured but much smaller costal spot at three-quarters, outwardly edged by a narrow white costal streak, between the fascia and the dorsal spot a yellow streak at dorsum, apical line as a short silver metallic streak with bluish reflection in the middle of the apical area and a broad white spot in cilia at apex, cilia dark brown, paler on dorsum towards base. Hindwing shining brownish grey, cilia brown. Underside: forewing shining dark greyish brown with the white costal streak and apical spot distinctly visible, hindwing greyish brown. Abdomen dorsally shining pale ochreous-brown with reddish gloss, laterally darker, segments two to seven banded light grey posteriorly, ventrally dark greyish brown, segments broadly banded shining white posteriorly and with a shining white longitudinal medial streak, anal tuft greyish brown.
