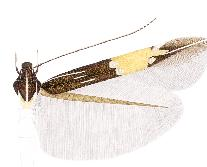

Scientific classification
- Kingdom: Animalia
- Phylum: Arthropoda
- Clade: Pancrustacea
- Class: Insecta
- Order: Lepidoptera
- Family: Cosmopterigidae
- Genus: Cosmopterix
- Species: C. nieukerkeni

Binomial name
- Cosmopterix nieukerkeni Koster, 2010

= Cosmopterix nieukerkeni =

Species of moth

Cosmopterix nieukerkeni is a moth of the family Cosmopterigidae. It is known from Argentina (Tucumán) and Brazil (Federal District).

Adults have been recorded in October and December, as well as in March and April. This species is likely bivoltine.

== Description ==
Male. Forewing length 3.3-3.8 mm. Head: frons shining silvery white, vertex and neck tufts shining dark brown with reddish gloss, laterally and medially lined white, collar shining dark brown; labial palpus first segment very short, white, second segment four-fifths of the length of third, dark brown with white longitudinal lines laterally and ventrally, third segment white, lined dark brown laterally; scape dorsally dark shining brown with a white anterior line, ventrally white, antenna shining dark brown, with a white line from base to three-quarters, followed towards apex by four white segments each separated by one brown segment, approximately five dark brown segments and two white segments at apex. Thorax and tegulae shining dark brown, thorax with a white median line and tegulae lined white inwardly. Legs: shining dark brown, foreleg with a white line on tibia and tarsal segments one, two and five, tibia of midleg with white oblique basal and medial lines and a white apical ring, tarsal segments one, two and four with white apical rings, segment five entirely white, tibia of hindleg as midleg, tarsal segment one with white basal and apical rings, segment two with a white apical ring, segments three to five entirely white, spurs white. Forewing shining dark brown with reddish gloss, three narrow white lines in the basal area, a subcostal from base to one-third and bending from costa, a very short medial just above fold, from one-quarter to one-third, a subdorsal, one and a half time as long as the medial, and slightly further from base, a bright yellow transverse fascia beyond the middle, narrowed towards dorsum and with an apical protrusion, bordered at the inner edge by two tubercular very pale golden metallic subcostal and subdorsal spots of equal size, both spots touching in the middle of the wing, the subcostal spot more towards base and outwardly with a patch of blackish scales, bordered at the outer edge by two similarly coloured but slightly smaller costal and subdorsal spots, the costal spot further from base than the subdorsal and inwardly edged by some dark brown scales and outwardly edged by a white costal streak, a shining white apical line from underneath the apical protrusion to the cilia, cilia dark brown, paler towards dorsum. Hindwing shining greyish brown, cilia brown. Underside: forewing shining greyish brown, the white costal streak and apical line distinctly visible, hindwing shining brownish grey.

== Etymology ==
The species is dedicated to Dr Erik van Nieukerken, Leiden, the Netherlands.
