= Cosmopterix ornithognathosella =

Scientific classification
- Kingdom: Animalia
- Phylum: Arthropoda
- Clade: Pancrustacea
- Class: Insecta
- Order: Lepidoptera
- Family: Cosmopterigidae
- Genus: Cosmopterix
- Species: C. ornithognathosella

Binomial name
- Cosmopterix ornithognathosella Mey, 1998

Species of moth

Cosmopterix ornithognathosella is a moth in the family Cosmopterigidae. It was described by Wolfram Mey in 1998. It is found on Mindanao in the Philippines.
