= Cosmopterix neodesma =

Scientific classification
- Kingdom: Animalia
- Phylum: Arthropoda
- Class: Insecta
- Order: Lepidoptera
- Family: Cosmopterigidae
- Genus: Cosmopterix
- Species: C. neodesma

Binomial name
- Cosmopterix neodesma Meyrick, 1915

Synonyms
- Cosmopteryx neodesma

Species of moth

Cosmopterix neodesma is a moth in the family Cosmopterigidae. It was described by Edward Meyrick in 1915. It is found in Kodagu district, India.
