= Cosmopterix javanica =

Scientific classification
- Kingdom: Animalia
- Phylum: Arthropoda
- Class: Insecta
- Order: Lepidoptera
- Family: Cosmopterigidae
- Genus: Cosmopterix
- Species: C. javanica

Binomial name
- Cosmopterix javanica Kuroko, 2011

Species of moth

Cosmopterix javanica is a moth in the family Cosmopterigidae. It was described by Kuroko in 2011. It is found on Java.
