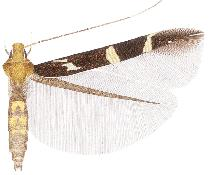

Scientific classification
- Kingdom: Animalia
- Phylum: Arthropoda
- Clade: Pancrustacea
- Class: Insecta
- Order: Lepidoptera
- Family: Cosmopterigidae
- Genus: Cosmopterix
- Species: C. chalupae

Binomial name
- Cosmopterix chalupae Koster, 2010

= Cosmopterix chalupae =

Species of moth

Cosmopterix chalupae is a moth of the Cosmopterigidae family. The species was first described in 1995 in the Salta Province of Argentina, and was classified as a distinct species in 2010.

Physically, C. chalupae resembles Cosmopterix trifasciella, but differ in the coloration of the antennae. Additionally, C. chalupae possesses a collection of pale yellow spots on the abdomen, further distinguishing it from other species in the genus.
