= Cosmopterix glaucogramma =

Scientific classification
- Kingdom: Animalia
- Phylum: Arthropoda
- Class: Insecta
- Order: Lepidoptera
- Family: Cosmopterigidae
- Genus: Cosmopterix
- Species: C. glaucogramma

Binomial name
- Cosmopterix glaucogramma Meyrick, 1934

Synonyms
- Cosmopteryx glaucogramma

Species of moth

Cosmopterix glaucogramma is a moth in the family Cosmopterigidae. It was described by Edward Meyrick in 1934. It is found on Java in Indonesia.
