= Cosmopterix splendens =

Scientific classification
- Kingdom: Animalia
- Phylum: Arthropoda
- Clade: Pancrustacea
- Class: Insecta
- Order: Lepidoptera
- Family: Cosmopterigidae
- Genus: Cosmopterix
- Species: C. splendens

Binomial name
- Cosmopterix splendens Sinev, 1985

Species of moth

Cosmopterix splendens is a moth in the family Cosmopterigidae. It is found in Russia.
