= Cosmopterix heliactis =

Scientific classification
- Kingdom: Animalia
- Phylum: Arthropoda
- Class: Insecta
- Order: Lepidoptera
- Family: Cosmopterigidae
- Genus: Cosmopterix
- Species: C. heliactis

Binomial name
- Cosmopterix heliactis (Meyrick, 1897)

Synonyms
- Cosmopteryx heliactis Meyrick, 1897

Species of moth

Cosmopterix heliactis is a moth of the family Cosmopterigidae. It is known from Australia.
