= Cosmopterix cuprea =

Scientific classification
- Domain: Eukaryota
- Kingdom: Animalia
- Phylum: Arthropoda
- Class: Insecta
- Order: Lepidoptera
- Family: Cosmopterigidae
- Genus: Cosmopterix
- Species: C. cuprea

Binomial name
- Cosmopterix cuprea Lower, 1916

Synonyms
- Cosmopteryx cuprea

Species of moth

Cosmopterix cuprea is a moth in the family Cosmopterigidae. It was described by Oswald Bertram Lower in 1916. It is found in Australia, where it has been recorded from northern Queensland.
