= Cosmopterix chrysobela =

Scientific classification
- Kingdom: Animalia
- Phylum: Arthropoda
- Class: Insecta
- Order: Lepidoptera
- Family: Cosmopterigidae
- Genus: Cosmopterix
- Species: C. chrysobela

Binomial name
- Cosmopterix chrysobela Meyrick, 1928

Synonyms
- Cosmopteryx chrysobela

Species of moth

Cosmopterix chrysobela is a moth in the family Cosmopterigidae. It was described by Edward Meyrick in 1928. It is found in India.
