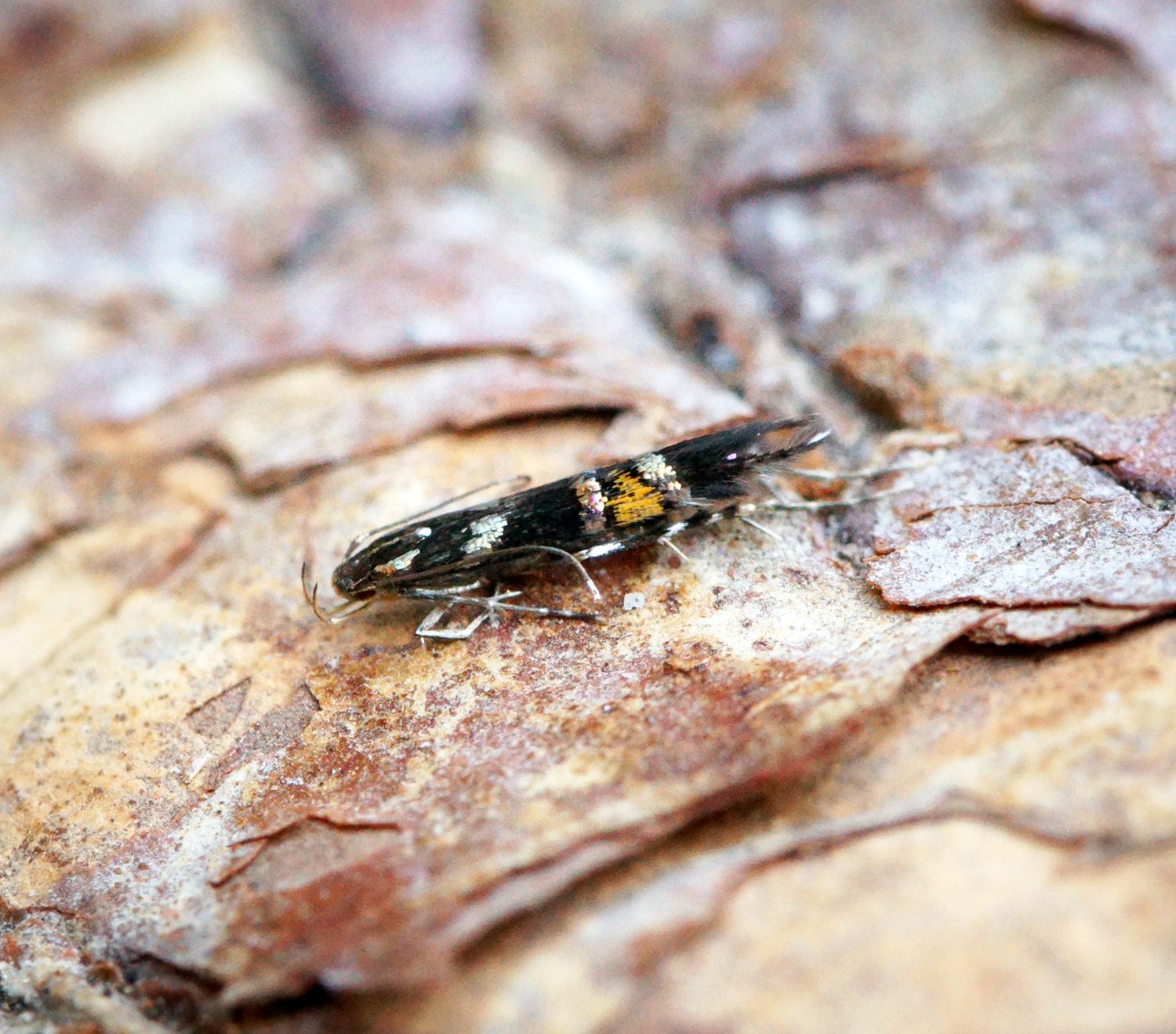

Scientific classification
- Kingdom: Animalia
- Phylum: Arthropoda
- Clade: Pancrustacea
- Class: Insecta
- Order: Lepidoptera
- Family: Cosmopterigidae
- Subfamily: Cosmopteriginae
- Genus: Cosmopterix; Hübner, [1825]

Type species
- Cosmopteryx lienigiella Zeller, in Lienig & Zeller, 1846

Synonyms
- Cosmopteryx Zeller, 1839; Lienigia Spuler, 1910

= Cosmopterix =

Genus of moths

Cosmopterix is a large genus of moth in the family Cosmopterigidae (cosmet moths).

== Description ==
=== Adult ===
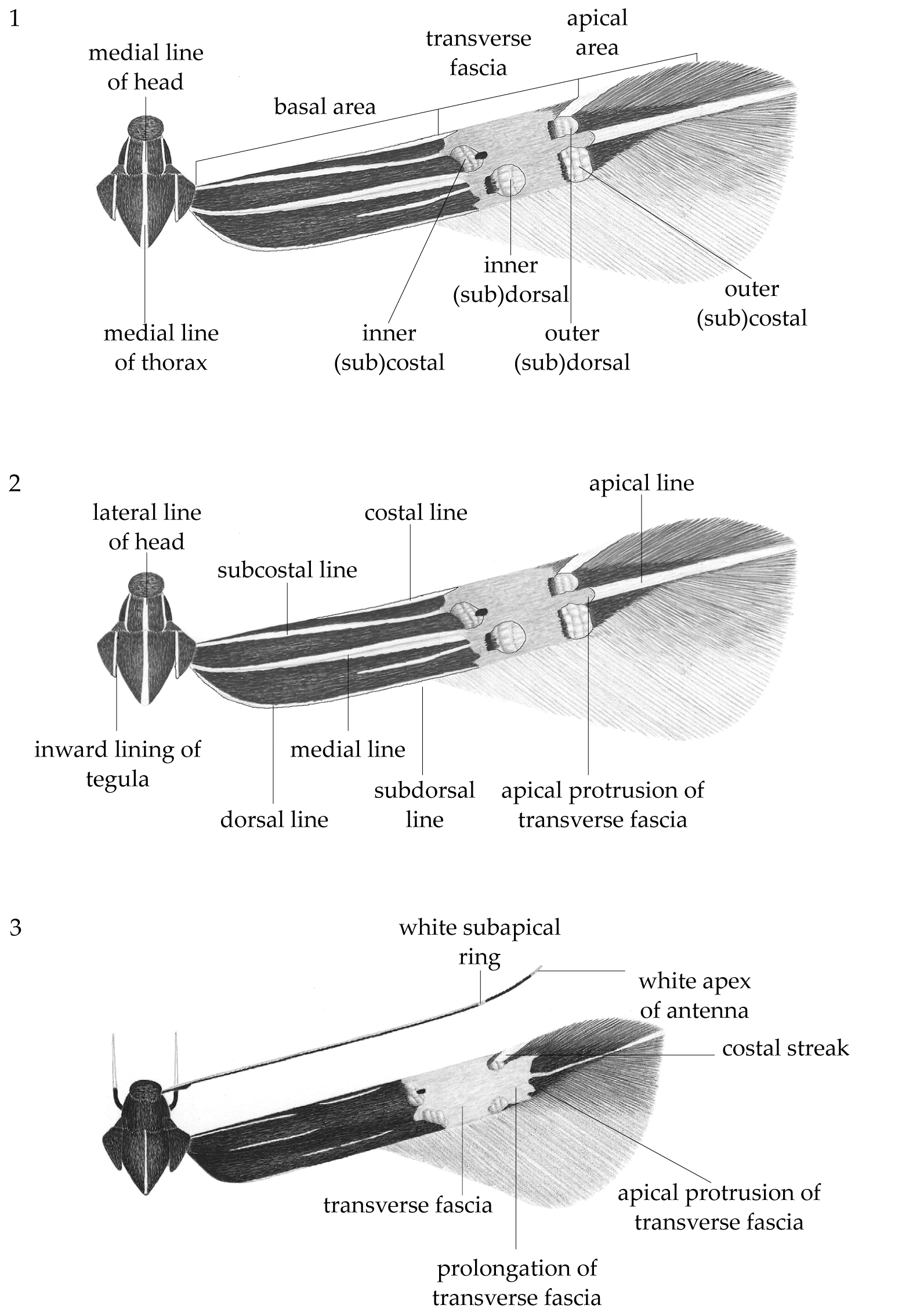
Descriptive terminology for head, thorax and forewing

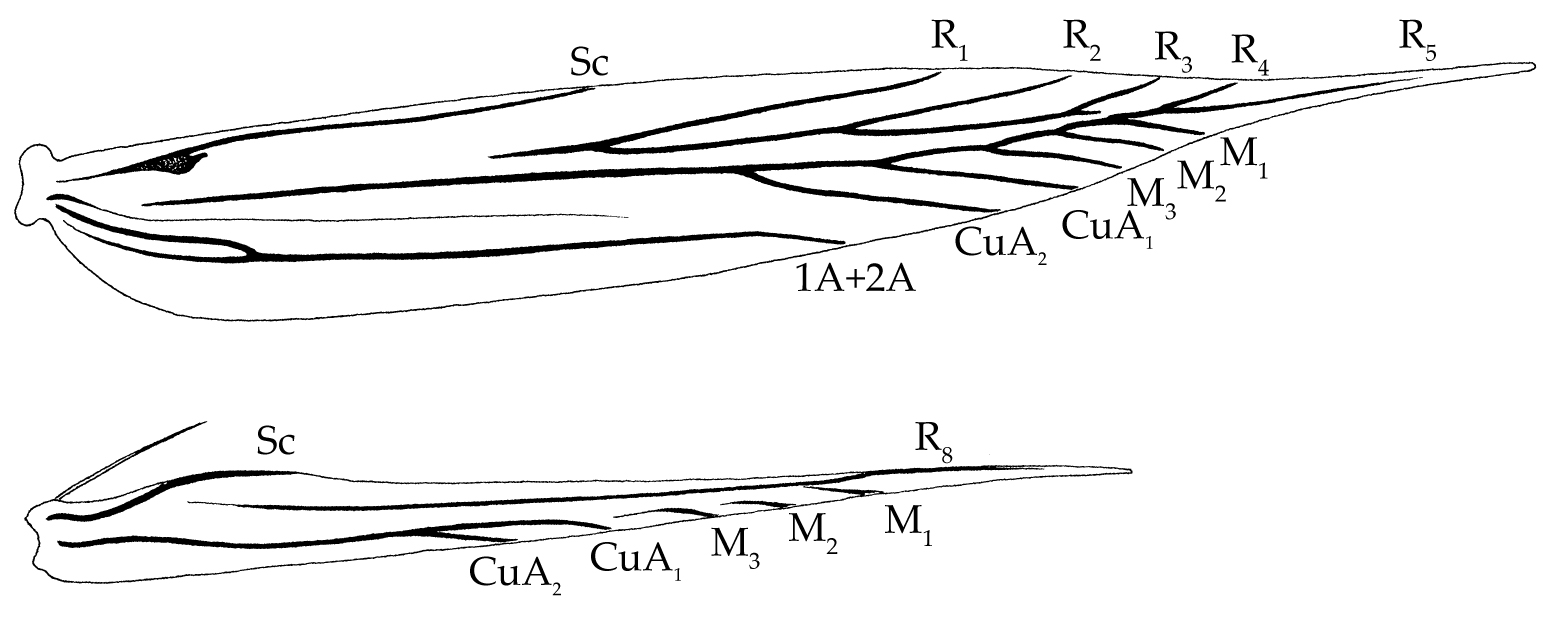
Wingvenation of Cosmopteryx lienigiella

Cosmopterix species are very small to small moths with a forewing length of 2.9-6.5 mm. Head smooth-scaled, rather long and narrow caused by the large and bent scales on the vertex; frons distinctly lighter than vertex, from vertex to neck tufts often a median and/or two lateral white lines; antenna three-quarters to four-fifths of the length of forewing, often slightly serrate distally, and generally with a white, often partly interrupted, anterior line and several white sections in the apical part; labial palpus cylindrical, porrect, apical segment strongly angled upwards and often reaching well above the head. Thorax with or without a median white line, tegulae often lined white inwardly. Forewing narrowly lanceolate with long and very narrowly protruding apex and usually with a very characteristic yellow or orange fascia beyond the middle, this fascia bordered by tubercular metallic fasciae or spots; basal area with a metallic fascia or spots or with three to six longitudinal lines of different length, cilia concolorous around apex, paler towards dorsum. Hindwing almost linear, less than half the width of forewing and acutely pointed, from pale yellow to dark grey, without markings, cilia concolorous without ciliary lines. The forewing can generally be divided into three parts: The basal area from base to middle of wing, followed by the broad transverse fascia and beyond this the apical area. The basal area generally with a series of longitudinal lines, often very narrow or a single and oblique, sometimes interrupted, fascia. The lines are mentioned from costa to dorsum as the costal, the subcostal, the medial, the subdorsal and the dorsal line. The transverse fascia is strikingly coloured from pale yellow to orange and in combination with the narrow wings it makes the species of Cosmopterix and Pebobs easy recognisable. The transverse fascia is always more or less edged on both sides by fasciae or spots. These fascia or spots consist of very strikingly silver or golden metallic coloured tubercular scales. Some species partly or completely lack the yellowish colour of the transverse fascia. However, the presence of the ‘fascia’ can be observed by the lining tubercular fasciae or spots. The transverse fascia can be edged by a combination of inner and outer fasciae and/or by an inner and outer (sub)costal and (sub)dorsal spots. Sometimes the (sub)costal and (sub)dorsal spots are situated inside the transverse fascia. The apical area is generally concolorous with the basal area, but occasionally the colouration differs. In the centre or on the dorsal side of the apical area is a longitudinal apical line, running from the transverse fascia to apex of forewing. This line is often interrupted or only present as one or more dots or streaks. Markings of the costal and dorsal cilia of the forewing are as follows: a white streak from outer costal spot in almost all of the species, a white streak or spot connected to the apical line is very common, and occasionally there is a white streak from outer dorsal spot. For identification of the species by the external features, mainly the markings of the head, thorax and forewing are of diagnostic importance. Wing venation with 12 veins in forewing and 7 veins in hindwing. Forewing with Sc and R1-R4 to costa; R5 directing towards the narrow tip; M1-CuA2 to termen; CuP very weak and not reaching termen; 1A+2A with basal fork, to dorsum. Hindwing Sc and Rs to costa; M1-CuA2 to termen; veins often not fully developed due to the narrow shape of the hindwing.

=== Biology ===
The larvae are leaf miners on a large diversity of usually herbaceous plants. They have been found oligophagous or even monophagous on the following plant families: Asteraceae, Cannabaceae, Convolvulaceae, Cyperaceae, Poaceae, Fabaceae, Urticaceae. The mines are blotch mines and in several species the larvae more or less frequently change mines. Larvae of other species stay in a single mine during their complete development and leave the mine only prior to pupation or pupate inside the mine. In several species the larva constructs a silken tunnel inside the mine in which it hides when not feeding or when disturbed. In colder climates species usually have one generation where hibernation takes place in the larval stage in a cocoon in or outside the mine. Pupation takes place in spring. In warmer climates the species have more than one, sometimes overlapping, generations.

For Cosmopterix gomezpompai a twirling behaviour has been observed by the adult. In this case the moth runs on the upper side of a leaf and simultaneously makes very fast circling movements. As soon as it comes across something unusual on the surface, like a spot, the circling slows down and is concentrated on that spot. It appears that it is feeding mostly on the dark brown spots (most likely a part of a bird dropping) on the leaf. Probably the moth is looking for nutrition. The twirling behaviour, without the possible feeding, has also been observed with Cosmopterix pulchrimella in Greece. This behaviour is described for Cosmopterix victor and also for a species of the family Gelechiidae.

=== Selected species ===
- Cosmopterix abnormalis Walsingham, 1897
- Cosmopterix aculeata Meyrick, 1909
- Cosmopterix acutivalva Kuroko, 1987
- Cosmopterix adrastea Koster, 2010
- Cosmopterix albicaudis Meyrick, 1932
- Cosmopterix amalthea Koster, 2010
- Cosmopterix anadoxa Meyrick, 1909
- Cosmopterix ananke Koster, 2010
- Cosmopterix ancalodes Meyrick, 1909
- Cosmopterix ancistraea Meyrick, 1913
- Cosmopterix angoonae Kuroko, 1987
- Cosmopterix antemidora Meyrick, 1909
- Cosmopterix antichorda Meyrick, 1909
- Cosmopterix aphranassa Meyrick, 1926
- Cosmopterix argentifera Koster, 2010
- Cosmopterix argentitegulella Sinev, 1985
- Cosmopterix artifica Meyrick, 1909
- Cosmopterix asiatica Stainton, 1859
- Cosmopterix asignella Sinev, 1988
- Cosmopterix astrapias Walsingham, 1909
- Cosmopterix asymmetrella Sinev, 1993
- Cosmopterix athesiae Huemer & Koster 2006
- Cosmopterix attenuatella Walker, 1864
- Cosmopterix aurella Bradley, 1959
- Cosmopterix aurotegulae Koster, 2010
- Cosmopterix bacata Hodges, 1962
- Cosmopterix bactrophora Meyrick, 1908
- Cosmopterix baihashanella Kuroko & Y.Q. Liu, 2005
- Cosmopterix bambusae Meyrick, 1917
- Cosmopterix basilisca Meyrick, 1909
- Cosmopterix beckeri Koster, 2010
- Cosmopterix belonacma Meyrick, 1909
- Cosmopterix bichromella Sinev & Park, 1994
- Cosmopterix bifidiguttata Kuroko & Y.Q. Liu, 2005
- Cosmopterix brachyclina Meyrick, 1933
- Cosmopterix brevicaudella Kuroko & Y.Q. Liu, 2005
- Cosmopterix callichalca Meyrick, 1922
- Cosmopterix callinympha Meyrick, 1913
- Cosmopterix calliochra Turner, 1926
- Cosmopterix callisto Koster, 2010
- Cosmopterix calypso Meyrick, 1919
- Cosmopterix carpo Koster, 2010
- Cosmopterix catharacma Meyrick, 1909
- Cosmopterix chalcelata Turner, 1923
- Cosmopterix chaldene Koster, 2010
- Cosmopterix chalupae Koster, 2010
- Cosmopterix chalybaeella Walsingham, 1889
- Cosmopterix chasanica Sinev, 1985
- Cosmopterix chisosensis Hodges, 1978
- Cosmopterix chlorochalca Meyrick, 1915
- Cosmopterix chlorochalca Meyrick, 1915
- Cosmopterix chrysobela Meyrick, 1928
- Cosmopterix chrysocrates Meyrick, 1919
- Cosmopterix circe Meyrick, 1921
- Cosmopterix citrinopa Meyrick, 1915
- Cosmopterix clandestinella Busck, 1906
- Cosmopterix clemensella Stainton, 1860
- Cosmopterix cleophanes Meyrick, 1937
- Cosmopterix cognita Walsingham, 1891
- Cosmopterix complicata Kuroko, 1987
- Cosmopterix coryphaea Walsingham, 1908
- Cosmopterix crassicervicella Chretien, 1896
- Cosmopterix cuprea Lower, 1916
- Cosmopterix cyclopaea Meyrick, 1909
- Cosmopterix dacryodes Meyrick, 1911
- Cosmopterix damnosa Hodges, 1962
- Cosmopterix dapifera Hodges, 1962
- Cosmopterix delicatella Walsingham, 1889
- Cosmopterix diandra Clarke, 1986
- Cosmopterix diaphora Walsingham, 1909
- Cosmopterix diplozona Meyrick, 1921
- Cosmopterix dulcivora Meyrick, 1919
- Cosmopterix ebriola Hodges, 1962
- Cosmopterix emmolybda Meyrick, 1914
- Cosmopterix epismaragda Meyrick, 1932
- Cosmopterix epizona Meyrick, 1897
- Cosmopterix erasmia Meyrick, 1915
- Cosmopterix erethista Meyrick, 1909
- Cosmopterix erinome Koster, 2010
- Cosmopterix ermolaevi Sinev, 1985
- Cosmopterix etmylaurae Koster, 2010
- Cosmopterix euanthe Koster, 2010
- Cosmopterix eukelade Koster, 2010
- Cosmopterix euporie Koster, 2010
- Cosmopterix facunda Hodges, 1978
- Cosmopterix feminella Sinev, 1988
- Cosmopterix fernaldella Walsingham, 1882
- Cosmopterix flava Sinev, 1986
- Cosmopterix flavidella Kuroko, 2011
- Cosmopterix floridanella Beutenmüller, 1889
- Cosmopterix fulminella Stringer, 1930
- Cosmopterix galapagosensis Landry, 2001
- Cosmopterix ganymedes Koster, 2010
- Cosmopterix geminella Sinev, 1985
- Cosmopterix gemmiferella Clemens, 1860
- Cosmopterix gielisorum Koster, 2010
- Cosmopterix glaucogramma Meyrick, 1934
- Cosmopterix gloriosa Meyrick, 1922
- Cosmopterix gomezpompai Koster, 2010
- Cosmopterix gracilis Sinev, 1985
- Cosmopterix gramineella Kuroko, 1987
- Cosmopterix hamifera Meyrick, 1909
- Cosmopterix harpalyke Koster, 2010
- Cosmopterix heliactis Meyrick, 1897
- Cosmopterix helike Koster, 2010
- Cosmopterix hermippe Koster, 2010
- Cosmopterix hieraspis Meyrick, 1924
- Cosmopterix himalia Koster, 2010
- Cosmopterix holophracta Meyrick, 1909
- Cosmopterix inaugurata Meyrick, 1922
- Cosmopterix infundibulella Sinev, 1988
- Cosmopterix ingeniosa Meyrick, 1909
- Cosmopterix inopis Hodges, 1962
- Cosmopterix interfracta Meyrick, 1922
- Cosmopterix io Koster, 2010
- Cosmopterix iocaste Koster, 2010
- Cosmopterix iphigona Meyrick, 1915
- Cosmopterix irrubricata Walsingham, 1909
- Cosmopterix isoteles Meyrick, 1919
- Cosmopterix isotoma Meyrick, 1915
- Cosmopterix issikiella Kuroko, 1957
- Cosmopterix javanica Kuroko, 2011
- Cosmopterix jiangxiella Kuroko & Y.Q. Liu, 2005
- Cosmopterix karsholti Koster, 2010
- Cosmopterix kerzhneri Sinev, 1982
- Cosmopterix kurilensis Sinev, 1985
- Cosmopterix kurokoi Sinev, 1985
- Cosmopterix kuznetzovi Sinev, 1988
- Cosmopterix laetifica Meyrick, 1909
- Cosmopterix laetificoides Sinev, 1993
- Cosmopterix langmaidi Koster, 2010
- Cosmopterix latilineata Kuroko, 1987
- Cosmopterix lautissimella Amsel, 1968
- Cosmopterix lespedezae Walsingham, 1882
- Cosmopterix licnura Meyrick, 1909
- Cosmopterix lienigiella Zeller, 1846
- Cosmopterix ligyrodes Meyrick, 1915
- Cosmopterix longilineata Kuroko, 1987
- Cosmopterix longivalvella Kuroko & Y.Q. Liu, 2005
- Cosmopterix lummyae Koster, 2010
- Cosmopterix lungsuana Kuroko, 2008
- Cosmopterix luteoapicalis Sinev, 2002
- Cosmopterix lysithea Koster, 2010
- Cosmopterix macroglossa Meyrick, 1913
- Cosmopterix macrula Meyrick, 1897
- Cosmopterix madeleinae Landry, 2001
- Cosmopterix magophila Meyrick, 1919
- Cosmopterix manipularis Meyrick, 1909
- Cosmopterix margaritae Kuroko, 2011
- Cosmopterix maritimella Sinev, 1985
- Cosmopterix melanarches Meyrick, 1928
- Cosmopterix metis Koster, 2010
- Cosmopterix minutella Beutenmüller, 1889
- Cosmopterix mneme Koster, 2010
- Cosmopterix molybdina Hodges, 1962
- Cosmopterix montisella Chambers, 1875
- Cosmopterix mystica Meyrick, 1897
- Cosmopterix nanshanella Kuroko & Y.Q. Liu, 2005
- Cosmopterix navarroi Koster, 2010
- Cosmopterix neodesma Meyrick, 1915
- Cosmopterix nieukerkeni Koster, 2010
- Cosmopterix nishidai Koster, 2010
- Cosmopterix nitens Walsingham, 1889
- Cosmopterix nonna Clarke, 1986
- Cosmopterix nyctiphanes Meyrick, 1915
- Cosmopterix ochleria Walsingham, 1909
- Cosmopterix omelkoi Sinev, 1993
- Cosmopterix opulenta Braun, 1919
- Cosmopterix orichalcea Stainton, 1861
- Cosmopterix ornithognathosella Mey, 1998
- Cosmopterix orthosie Koster, 2010
- Cosmopterix oxyglossa Meyrick, 1909
- Cosmopterix pallifasciella Snellen, 1897
- Cosmopterix paltophanes Meyrick, 1909
- Cosmopterix panayella Mey, 1998
- Cosmopterix panopla Meyrick, 1909
- Cosmopterix pararufella Riedl, 1976
- Cosmopterix pentachorda Meyrick, 1915
- Cosmopterix phaeogastra Meyrick, 1917
- Cosmopterix phaesphora Turner, 1923
- Cosmopterix phyladelphella Sinev, 1985
- Cosmopterix phyllostachysea Kuroko, 1975
- Cosmopterix pimmaarteni Koster, 2010
- Cosmopterix plesiasta Meyrick, 1919
- Cosmopterix plumbigutella Kuroko, 1987
- Cosmopterix pocsi Sinev, 1988
- Cosmopterix praxidike Koster, 2010
- Cosmopterix pseudomontisella Sinev, 1988
- Cosmopterix pulchrimella Chambers, 1875
- Cosmopterix pustulatella Snellen, 1897
- Cosmopterix pyrozela Meyrick, 1922
- Cosmopterix quadrilineella Chambers, 1878
- Cosmopterix rhyncognathosella Sinev, 1985
- Cosmopterix rumakomi Kuroko, 1987
- Cosmopterix salahinella Chretien, 1907
- Cosmopterix saltensis Koster, 2010
- Cosmopterix sapporensis Matsumura, 1931
- Cosmopterix scaligera Meyrick, 1909
- Cosmopterix schmidiella Frey, 1856
- Cosmopterix schouteni Koster, 2010
- Cosmopterix scirpicola Hodges, 1962
- Cosmopterix scribaiella Zeller, 1850
- Cosmopterix semnota Meyrick, 1914
- Cosmopterix setariella Sinev, 1985
- Cosmopterix sharkovi Sinev, 1988
- Cosmopterix sibirica Sinev, 1985
- Cosmopterix sichuanella Kuroko & Y.Q. Liu, 2005
- Cosmopterix similis Walsingham, 1897
- Cosmopterix sinelinea Hodges, 1978
- Cosmopterix spiculata Meyrick, 1909
- Cosmopterix splendens Sinev, 1985
- Cosmopterix subsplendens Sinev, 1988
- Cosmopterix tabellaria Meyrick, 1908
- Cosmopterix taygete Koster, 2010
- Cosmopterix teligera Meyrick, 1915
- Cosmopterix tenax Meyrick, 1915
- Cosmopterix tetrophthalma Meyrick, 1921
- Cosmopterix thebe Koster, 2010
- Cosmopterix thelxinoe Koster, 2010
- Cosmopterix themisto Koster, 2010
- Cosmopterix thrasyzela Meyrick, 1915
- Cosmopterix thyone Koster, 2010
- Cosmopterix toraula Meyrick, 1911
- Cosmopterix transcissa Meyrick, 1914
- Cosmopterix trifasciella Koster, 2010
- Cosmopterix trilopha Meyrick, 1922
- Cosmopterix turbidella Rebel, 1896
- Cosmopterix vanderwolfi Koster, 2010
- Cosmopterix vexillaris Meyrick, 1909
- Cosmopterix victor Stringer, 1930
- Cosmopterix wongsirii Kuroko, 1987
- Cosmopterix xanthura Walsingham, 1909
- Cosmopterix xuthogastra Meyrick, 1910
- Cosmopterix yvani Landry, 2001
- Cosmopterix zathea Meyrick, 1917
- Cosmopterix zenobia Meyrick, 1921
- Cosmopterix zieglerella Hubner, 1810

== Status unknown ==
- Cosmopterix phengitella (Hübner, 1811), described from Europe in Tinea

== Selected former species ==
- Cosmopterix ceriocosma Meyrick, 1934
- Cosmopterix labathiella Viette, 1956

Furthermore, "Cosmopterix" cyanosticta is not a cosmet moth, but belongs to the fungus moth genus Erechthias.
