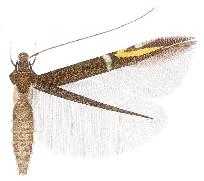

Scientific classification
- Kingdom: Animalia
- Phylum: Arthropoda
- Clade: Pancrustacea
- Class: Insecta
- Order: Lepidoptera
- Family: Cosmopterigidae
- Genus: Cosmopterix
- Species: C. schouteni

Binomial name
- Cosmopterix schouteni Koster, 2010

= Cosmopterix schouteni =

Species of moth

Cosmopterix schouteni is a moth of the family Cosmopterigidae. It is known from Jujuy Province, Argentina.

Adults have been recorded in January.

== Description ==
Female. Forewing length 4.2 mm. Head: frons shining silvery white, vertex and neck tufts shining dark brown with greenish reflection, laterally narrowly lined white, collar shining dark brown; labial palpus first segment very short, white, second segment three-quarters of the length of third, dorsally dark brown, ventrally white, third segment white with a dark brown line ventrally; scape dorsally shining dark brown with a white anterior line, ventrally shining white, antenna shining dark brown, ventrally paler. Thorax and tegulae shining dark brown with greenish reflection. Legs: femora shining ochreous, apically shining grey, foreleg with a white line on tibia and tarsal segments one and two, tibia of midleg with a white apical ring, tarsal segments with indistinct white spots, tibia of hindleg dorsally with three tufts of raised blackish hairs with greenish gloss and a narrow bluish silver medial ring, tarsal segment four and five pale ochreous, spurs dark greyish brown, apically lighter. Forewing shining dark brown with greenish, reddish and purplish reflections, at one-half a narrow, tubercular, bluish silver metallic fascia, at four-fifths, a tubercular bluish silver outer costal spot, bordered on the outside by a pale ochreous-brown costal streak, on dorsum, inward of the costal spot, some bluish silver scales as remains of the outer dorsal spot, between fascia and costal spot a geniculate yellow streak from costa with the long arm reaching almost to apex, a golden metallic apical line from below the apex of the long arm of the yellow streak to the cilia, changing to shining white in the cilia, cilia dark brown around apex, slightly paler towards dorsum. Hindwing shining dark brown, cilia dark brown. Underside: forewing shining dark brown, hindwing shining dark brown. Abdomen dorsally dark brown, segments posteriorly banded shining dark brown with purplish gloss, ventrally shining pale yellow, anal tuft shining dark brown.

== Etymology ==
The species is dedicated to Mr. Rob Schouten, Oegstgeest, the Netherlands, one of the participants of the Netherlands Entomological Expedition to the North of Argentina.
