= Cosmopterix callinympha =

Scientific classification
- Kingdom: Animalia
- Phylum: Arthropoda
- Class: Insecta
- Order: Lepidoptera
- Family: Cosmopterigidae
- Genus: Cosmopterix
- Species: C. callinympha

Binomial name
- Cosmopterix callinympha Meyrick, 1913

Species of moth

Cosmopterix callinympha is a moth in the family Cosmopterigidae. It was described by Edward Meyrick in 1913. It is found in South Africa.

The wingspan is about 12 mm. The forewings are bronzy ochreous with the costal and dorsal edges white from the base to the band and with a white subcostal line almost from the base to the band, touching the costa anteriorly. There is a white median line from the base to the band and a white subdorsal line from one-fourth to the band, as well as a broad irregular-edged orange band extending from before the middle to two-thirds, containing four golden-metallic spots (two dorsal, one subcostal beyond the first dorsal, edged posteriorly with a black speck, and one costal above the second dorsal). There is a white streak from the band along the termen to the apex. The hindwings are whitish.
