= Cosmopterix sharkovi =

Scientific classification
- Kingdom: Animalia
- Phylum: Arthropoda
- Clade: Pancrustacea
- Class: Insecta
- Order: Lepidoptera
- Family: Cosmopterigidae
- Genus: Cosmopterix
- Species: C. sharkovi

Binomial name
- Cosmopterix sharkovi Sinev, 1988

Species of moth

Cosmopterix sharkovi is a moth in the family Cosmopterigidae.
