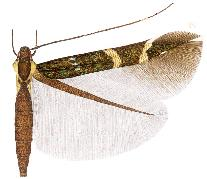

Scientific classification
- Kingdom: Animalia
- Phylum: Arthropoda
- Clade: Pancrustacea
- Class: Insecta
- Order: Lepidoptera
- Family: Cosmopterigidae
- Genus: Cosmopterix
- Species: C. aurotegulae

Binomial name
- Cosmopterix aurotegulae Koster, 2010

= Cosmopterix aurotegulae =

Species of moth from Mexico

Cosmopterix aurotegulae is a moth of the family Cosmopterigidae. It is known from Veracruz, Mexico.

Adults have been collected in June.

== Description ==
Female.

Forewing length 3.9 mm.

Head: frons shining pale golden metallic with greenish and purplish reflections, vertex shining dark brown with golden gloss, neck tufts shining dark brown with greenish and purplish reflections, laterally lined white, collar shining dark brown with greenish and reddish reflections; labial palpus first segment very short, brownish grey, second segment four-fifths of the length of third, shining dark brown with indistinct whitish longitudinal lines on both sides, third segment dark brown with a white dorsal line; scape dorsally shining dark brown with a white anterior line, ventrally white, antenna shining dark brown, at two-thirds a white ring of approximately five segments, some of these white segments partially brown.

Thorax: shining dark brown with greenish and reddish reflections, tegulae shining pale golden metallic.

Legs: shining dark brown with golden gloss, foreleg with a white line on tibia and tarsal segments one and five, segment two dorsally white in apical half, tibia of midleg with an indistinct white very oblique basal line, an oblique white medial line and a white apical ring, tarsal segments one and two with white apical rings, segment five entirely white, tibia of hindleg as midleg, but with an additional broad pale golden subapical ring and without a white apical ring, tarsal segments four and five entirely white, spurs dark brown, apically whitish.

Forewing: shining dark brown with golden gloss, three very small silvery white streaks with strong bluish gloss in the basal area, the spots in a slightly outwardly oblique row, the subcostal nearest to base and slightly longer than the medial and subdorsal, the medial below end of subcostal, the subdorsal slightly further from base than the medial, a broad, slightly inwardly oblique, tubercular pale golden metallic fascia at the middle, a similar fascia, but outwardly oblique, at three-quarters, outer fascia outwardly edged by a white costal streak, apical line as a silvery white spot in the middle of the apical area and a broad white spot in cilia at apex, cilia dark brown, paler towards dorsum. Hindwing shining dark brown, cilia brown. Underside: forewing shining dark greyish brown with greenish gloss, white costal streak and apical line distinctly visible, hindwing shining dark greyish brown. Abdomen dorsally shining dark brown with reddish gloss, ventrally segments broadly banded shining white posteriorly and with a broad white ventral streak, segment seven dark brown, anal tuft dark brown.

== Etymology ==
The name of the species is derived from the golden colour of the tegulae. A noun (plural) in apposition.
