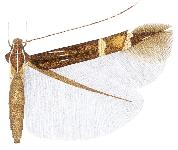

Scientific classification
- Kingdom: Animalia
- Phylum: Arthropoda
- Clade: Pancrustacea
- Class: Insecta
- Order: Lepidoptera
- Family: Cosmopterigidae
- Genus: Cosmopterix
- Species: C. gomezpompai

Binomial name
- Cosmopterix gomezpompai Koster, 2010

= Cosmopterix gomezpompai =

Species of moth

Cosmopterix gomezpompai is a moth of the family Cosmopterigidae. It is known from Costa Rica.

Adults have been recorded in June. They have been observed twirling and dancing on a leaf.

== Description ==
Female. Forewing length 3.2 mm. Head: frons shining silvery grey with greenish and reddish reflections, vertex shining dark brown, neck tufts shining dark brown with reddish reflection, laterally and medially lined white, medial white line very narrow, collar shining dark brown; labial palpus first segment very short, greyish white, second segment four-fifths of the length of third, dark brown with greyish white longitudinal lines laterally, third segment white, lined dark brown laterally, tip white; scape dorsally shining dark brown with a white anterior line, ventrally shining white, antenna shining dark brown with a white line from base changing to an interrupted line to beyond one-half, followed towards apex by eight to ten dark brown segments, two white, two dark brown, two white, ten dark brown and seven white segments at apex. Thorax and tegulae shining dark brown with reddish gloss, thorax with a white median line, tegulae narrowly lined white inwardly. Legs: foreleg and midleg shining brownish grey, hindlegs shining dark brown, femora of hindleg with strong golden gloss, foreleg with a white line on tibia and tarsal segments one, two and basal half of three, tibia of midleg with a white oblique medial line and a white apical ring, tarsal segments one and two with a short white dorsal streak at apex, segment five entirely white, tibia of hindleg with white oblique basal and medial lines, a pale golden subapical spot and a white apical ring, tarsal segment three dorsally and segments four and five entirely white, spurs dark greyish brown. Forewing shining dark brown with reddish gloss, three white lines in the basal area, a subcostal from one-tenth to one fifth, bending from costa distally, a short medial above fold, its centre just below the tip of the subcostal, a subdorsal underneath the medial and slightly longer, a dark yellowish transverse fascia beyond the middle, strongly irrorated with dark brown scales so that only a patch of yellow scales remains in middle of apical half, bordered at the inner edge by a tubercular pale golden metallic fascia almost perpendicular at dorsum, bordered at the outer edge by an irregular inwardly oblique tubercular pale golden metallic fascia, a white costal streak connected to the outer fascia, the apical line as a short white streak in the middle on dorsum of the apical area and a white streak in the apical cilia, cilia dark brown at apex, paler towards dorsum. Hindwing shining dark greyish brown, cilia pale brown. Underside: forewing and hindwing shining brownish grey. Abdomen dorsally shining dark brown, ventrally shining dark greyish brown, segments broadly banded shining white posteriorly, segment six entirely dark brown, anal tuft dark brown with golden gloss.

== Etymology ==
The species is dedicated to Dr. Arturo Gómez-Pompa, University of California, Riverside, United States, who is a member of the International Advisory Board of the Instituto National de Biodiversidad (INBio), Santo Domingo de Heredia, Costa Rica.
