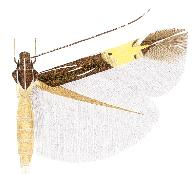

Scientific classification
- Kingdom: Animalia
- Phylum: Arthropoda
- Clade: Pancrustacea
- Class: Insecta
- Order: Lepidoptera
- Family: Cosmopterigidae
- Genus: Cosmopterix
- Species: C. damnosa

Binomial name
- Cosmopterix damnosa Hodges, 1962

= Cosmopterix damnosa =

Species of moth

Cosmopterix damnosa is a moth of the family Cosmopterigidae. It is known from the United States (from Florida, Louisiana, Mississippi, Michigan and New Hampshire).

Adults have been collected from late March to mid-April and in September, indicating two generations.

== Description ==
Male, female. Forewing length 3.3–5.1 mm. Head: frons shining white with greenish and reddish reflections, vertex and neck tufts shining dark brown with reddish gloss, laterally and medially lined white, collar shining dark brown; labial palpus first segment very short, white, second segment four-fifths of the length of third, dark brown with white longitudinal lines laterally and ventrally, third segment white, lined dark brown laterally; scape dorsally shining dark brown with a white anterior line, ventrally shining white; antenna shining dark brown, with a short white line at base changing into an interrupted white line to one-half, followed towards apex by a short dark brown section, three white segments, two dark brown, two white, ten dark brown and five to eight white segments at apex, sometimes the apical two or three segments dark brown, the tip of the antenna varies from completely white to the last two segments pale brownish to dark brown, the subapical white section can be complete or is sometimes divided in two parts. Thorax and tegulae shining dark brown with reddish gloss, thorax with a white median line, tegulae lined white inwardly. Legs: dark brown, femora of midleg and hindleg with dorsal half ochreous, foreleg with a white line on tibia and tarsal segments one to three, segment five entirely white, tibia of midleg with a white oblique basal line, some traces of a similar medial line and a white apical ring, tarsal segments one and two with white apical rings, segment five entirely white, tibia of hindleg with white oblique basal and medial lines and a white apical ring, tarsal segment one with a white basal ring and a white dorsal streak in apical half, remaining segments dorsally whitish, spurs dorsally whitish, ventrally dark grey. Forewing shining dark brown with reddish gloss, four narrow white lines in the basal area, a costal from one-third to the transverse fascia, a subcostal from base to one-quarter and bending from costa distally, a medial above fold from one-fifth to just beyond the end of the subcostal, a subdorsal, one and a half time as long as the medial and slightly further from base, a pale yellow transverse fascia beyond the middle, slightly narrowing towards dorsum and with a short and narrow apical protrusion in middle, this protrusion can be very short or even absent, bordered at the inner edge by a slightly inwardly oblique, tubercular pale golden metallic fascia, subdorsally on outside with a patch of blackish scales, bordered at the outer edge by two tubercular pale golden metallic costal and dorsal spots, the dorsal spot slightly larger than the costal and both spots opposite, the costal spot outwardly edged by a white costal streak, both spots irregularly lined dark brown inwardly, a shining white apical line from the apical protrusion, cilia dark brown, paler towards dorsum. Hindwing shining brownish grey, cilia greyish brown. Underside: forewing shining greyish brown, white apical line visible at apex, hindwing shining greyish brown. Abdomen dorsally from shining pale ochreous to pale brown with reddish reflection, segments banded greyish posteriorly, ventrally shining white, anal tuft white in male, ochreous-white in female.
