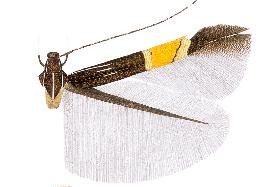

Scientific classification
- Kingdom: Animalia
- Phylum: Arthropoda
- Class: Insecta
- Order: Lepidoptera
- Family: Cosmopterigidae
- Genus: Cosmopterix
- Species: C. tenax

Binomial name
- Cosmopterix tenax Meyrick, 1915

= Cosmopterix tenax =

Species of moth

Cosmopterix tenax is a moth of the family Cosmopterigidae. It is known from Colombia.

Adults have been recorded in May.

== Description ==
Male. Forewing length 4.5 mm. Head: frons ochreous-white, vertex and neck tufts dark brown, narrowly lined white laterally, collar dark brown; labial palpus first segment very short, white, second segment three-quarters of the length of third, dark brown, inner side and ventrally greyish white and with white longitudinal lines laterally, third segment white, lined dark brown laterally; scape dorsally shining dark brown with a white anterior line, ventrally shining white, antenna dark brown with a white interrupted line from base to two-fifths, at three-quarters two white rings of one segment each separated by one dark brown segment, followed towards apex by ten dark brown, three white and five dark brown segments at apex. Thorax and tegulae dark brown, thorax with a white median line, tegulae lined white inwardly. Legs: dark brown, femora of midleg and hindleg shining golden grey, foreleg with a white line on tibia and tarsal segments one and two, and basal half of segment three, segment five entirely white, tibia of midleg with white oblique basal and medial streaks and a white apical ring, tarsal segments one and two with white oblique lines, segment five entirely white, tibia of hindleg as midleg but with an additional white subapical ring, and tarsal segments one and two with yellowish white apical rings, spurs white dorsally, greyish brown ventrally. Forewing shining dark brown, three white lines in the basal area, a subcostal from base to one-third, bending from costa in distal half, a short medial from one-fifth to the end of the subcostal, a subdorsal about as long as the medial, but slightly further from base, a yellow-orange transverse fascia beyond the middle, strongly narrowed towards dorsum, bordered on inner and outer edge by broad tubercular pale golden metallic fasciae, the inner almost perpendicular on dorsum and with a blackish spot on the outside, the outer inward oblique and lined dark brown on the inside, a white costal streak connected to outer fascia, a narrow and interrupted white apical line from the distal half of the apical area, ending broadly white in the cilia at apex, cilia dark brown around apex, paler towards dorsum, hindwing dark greyish brown, cilia greyish brown. Underside: forewing shining greyish brown, the white costal streak indistinctly and the white spot in the apical cilia distinctly visible.
