= Cosmopterix kerzhneri =

Scientific classification
- Kingdom: Animalia
- Phylum: Arthropoda
- Clade: Pancrustacea
- Class: Insecta
- Order: Lepidoptera
- Family: Cosmopterigidae
- Genus: Cosmopterix
- Species: C. kerzhneri

Binomial name
- Cosmopterix kerzhneri Sinev, 1982

Species of moth

Cosmopterix kerzhneri is a moth in the family Cosmopterigidae. It was described by Sinev in 1982.
