= Cosmopterix wongsirii =

Scientific classification
- Kingdom: Animalia
- Phylum: Arthropoda
- Class: Insecta
- Order: Lepidoptera
- Family: Cosmopterigidae
- Genus: Cosmopterix
- Species: C. wongsirii

Binomial name
- Cosmopterix wongsirii Kuroko, 1987

Species of moth

Cosmopterix wongsirii is a moth of the family Cosmopterigidae. It is known from Thailand.
