= Cosmopterix cleophanes =

Scientific classification
- Kingdom: Animalia
- Phylum: Arthropoda
- Class: Insecta
- Order: Lepidoptera
- Family: Cosmopterigidae
- Genus: Cosmopterix
- Species: C. cleophanes

Binomial name
- Cosmopterix cleophanes Meyrick, 1937

Species of moth

Cosmopterix cleophanes is a moth in the family Cosmopterigidae. It was described by Edward Meyrick in 1937. It is found in South Africa.
