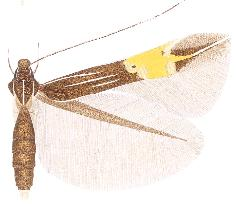

Scientific classification
- Kingdom: Animalia
- Phylum: Arthropoda
- Clade: Pancrustacea
- Class: Insecta
- Order: Lepidoptera
- Family: Cosmopterigidae
- Genus: Cosmopterix
- Species: C. saltensis

Binomial name
- Cosmopterix saltensis Koster, 2010

= Cosmopterix saltensis =

Species of moth

Cosmopterix saltensis is a moth of the family Cosmopterigidae. It is known from Salta, Argentina.

Adults have been recorded in January.

== Description ==
Male, female. Forewing length 4.2-4.5 mm. Head: frons shining pale grey with greenish reflection, vertex and neck tufts bronze brown, posteriorly olive brown, laterally lined white; labial palpus first segment very short, white, second segment three-quarters of the length of third, dark brown with white longitudinal lines laterally and ventrally in apical half, third segment white, lined dark brown laterally; scape dark brown with a white anterior line, white ventrally, antenna shining brown, a white line from base to two-fifths, followed towards apex by ten dark brown segments, one white, one dark brown, eight white, two dark brown, two white, ten dark brown and seven white segments at apex. Thorax and tegulae olive brown, thorax with white median line, tegulae lined white inwardly. Legs: shining dark brown, femora shining ochreous-white, edged shining pale grey on outside, foreleg with a white line on tibia and tarsal segments, tibia of midleg with white oblique basal, medial and apical lines, tarsal segments one and two with white apical rings, segment five entirely white, tibia of hindleg with a very oblique white line from base to beyond one-half and a white apical ring, tarsal segment one with a white basal ring and a white apical streak dorsally, segments two to four with white dorsal streaks, segment five white, spurs white, ventrally with a greyish-brown streak. Forewing olive brown, five narrow white lines in the basal area, a costal from one-third to the transverse fascia, a subcostal from base to one-third, bending from costa in distal half, a medial above fold from one-sixth and ending well before the transverse fascia, a subdorsal below fold from one-quarter and ending just beyond the medial, a dorsal from beyond base to one-quarter, a broad yellow transverse fascia beyond the middle, narrowed towards dorsum and with an apical protrusion, bordered at the inner edge by two pale golden metallic, tubercular subcostal and dorsal spots of similar size, the subcostal with a patch of blackish brown scales on the outside, the dorsal spot further from base, bordered at the outer edge by two similarly coloured costal and dorsal spots, both spots opposite, the costal spot edged brown on the inside and with a white costal streak, the dorsal spot about twice as large as the costal, a shining white apical line from the apical protrusion to apex, cilia ochreous-brown. Hindwing shining greyish brown, cilia ochreous-brown. Underside: forewing shining brown, the white costal streak and apical line distinctly visible, hindwing costal half shining brown, dorsal half shining grey. Abdomen dorsally shining brown, seventh segment banded yellowish white posteriorly, ventrally shining dark grey, segments banded shining greyish white posteriorly, anal tuft yellowish white, in female ventrally shining white, anal tuft white, further as male.

== Etymology ==
The species is named after the province Salta, the type locality in Argentina.
