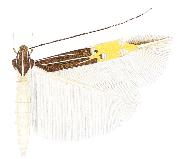

Scientific classification
- Kingdom: Animalia
- Phylum: Arthropoda
- Class: Insecta
- Order: Lepidoptera
- Family: Cosmopterigidae
- Genus: Cosmopterix
- Species: C. minutella

Binomial name
- Cosmopterix minutella Beutenmüller, 1889

= Cosmopterix minutella =

Species of moth

Cosmopterix minutella is a moth of the family Cosmopterigidae. It is known from Florida, United States.

Adults have been recorded from March to early May.

== Description ==
Male. Forewing length 3.8 mm.

Head: frons shining creamy white, posteriorly pale greyish brown with reddish reflections, vertex and neck tufts dark greyish brown with greenish and reddish reflections, medially and laterally lined white, collar dark greyish brown; labial palpus first segment very short, white, second segment three-quarters of the length of third, dark brown with white longitudinal lines laterally and ventrally, third segment white, lined dark brown laterally; scape dorsally dark brown with a white anterior line, ventrally greyish white with white apical spot, antenna dark brown with a white interrupted line from base to beyond one-half, followed towards apex by an annulate section of about ten segments, two white, two dark brown, two white, two dark brown, two white, two dark brown and eight white segments at apex, the last ring of two white segments in the antenna before apex can be dark brown. Thorax and tegulae dark greyish brown, thorax with a white median line, tegulae lined white inwardly.

Legs: dark brownish grey with reddish gloss, femur of midleg shining pale ochreous and femur of hindleg shining creamy white, foreleg with a white line on tibia and tarsal segments, tibia of midleg with white oblique basal and medial lines and a white apical ring, tarsal segments dorsally white, tibia of hindleg with long, very oblique basal and medial white lines, and white subapical and apical rings, tarsal segment as midleg, spurs white. Forewing dark greyish brown, five white lines in the basal area, a costal from one-quarter to the transverse fascia, a subcostal from base to one-third, bending from costa in distal half, a medial from base to the basal protrusion of the transverse fascia, a slightly oblique subdorsal from one-third to the transverse fascia, a dorsal from beyond base to one-quarter, a broad pale yellow transverse fascia from the middle with a short basal protrusion and an apical prolongation, bordered at the inner edge by two silver metallic subcostal and subdorsal spots, the subcostal spot with a patch of blackish scales on the outside, the subdorsal spot beyond inner edge of transverse fascia and further from base than the subcostal, edged dark brown on the inner side, two similarly coloured costal and dorsal spots at two-thirds of the transverse fascia, both spots opposite, the dorsal spot slightly larger than the costal, a white costal streak connected to the outer costal spot, a broad shining white apical line from the prolongation of the transverse fascia to apex, cilia ochreous-grey around apex, paler towards dorsum. Hindwing shining greyish white, cilia pale ochreous.

Underside: forewing basal half shining brownish grey, apical half pale greyish yellow; hindwing shining pale grey in costal half, whitish in dorsal half.
