= Cosmopterix lungsuana =

Scientific classification
- Kingdom: Animalia
- Phylum: Arthropoda
- Class: Insecta
- Order: Lepidoptera
- Family: Cosmopterigidae
- Genus: Cosmopterix
- Species: C. lungsuana

Binomial name
- Cosmopterix lungsuana Kuroko, 2008

Species of moth

Cosmopterix lungsuana is a moth of the family Cosmopterigidae. It is known from Thailand.
