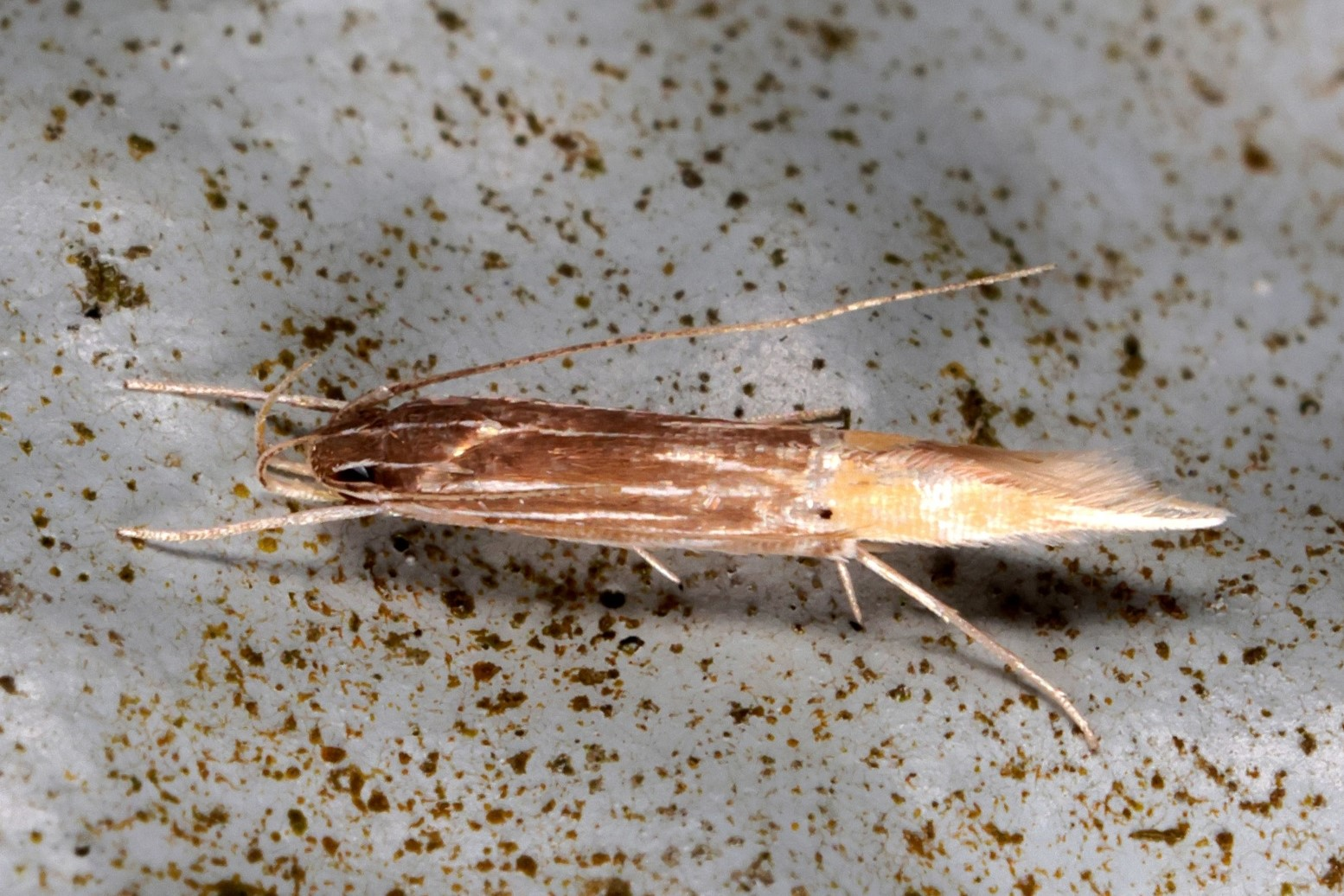

Scientific classification
- Kingdom: Animalia
- Phylum: Arthropoda
- Clade: Pancrustacea
- Class: Insecta
- Order: Lepidoptera
- Family: Cosmopterigidae
- Genus: Cosmopterix
- Species: C. hamifera

Binomial name
- Cosmopterix hamifera Meyrick, 1909

= Cosmopterix hamifera =

Species of moth

Cosmopterix hamifera is a species of moth in the family Cosmopterigidae. It is known from China, Sri Lanka, South Africa and India.
