= Cosmopterix angoonae =

Scientific classification
- Kingdom: Animalia
- Phylum: Arthropoda
- Class: Insecta
- Order: Lepidoptera
- Family: Cosmopterigidae
- Genus: Cosmopterix
- Species: C. angoonae

Binomial name
- Cosmopterix angoonae Kuroko, 1987

Species of moth from Thailand

Cosmopterix angoonae is a moth of the family Cosmopterigidae. It is known from Thailand.
