= Cosmopterix fulminella =

Scientific classification
- Domain: Eukaryota
- Kingdom: Animalia
- Phylum: Arthropoda
- Class: Insecta
- Order: Lepidoptera
- Family: Cosmopterigidae
- Genus: Cosmopterix
- Species: C. fulminella

Binomial name
- Cosmopterix fulminella Stringer, 1930

Synonyms
- Cosmopteryx fulminella

Species of moth

Cosmopterix fulminella is a moth in the family Cosmopterigidae. It was described by Stringer in 1930. It is found in Japan.
