= Cosmopterix margaritae =

Scientific classification
- Kingdom: Animalia
- Phylum: Arthropoda
- Class: Insecta
- Order: Lepidoptera
- Family: Cosmopterigidae
- Genus: Cosmopterix
- Species: C. margaritae

Binomial name
- Cosmopterix margaritae Kuroko, 2011

Species of moth

Cosmopterix margaritae is a moth of the family Cosmopterigidae. It is found from the island of Kyushu in Japan and from Taiwan.

The length of the forewings is 3.6–4 mm. Adults have been recorded on wing in July and November.

The larvae feed on Digitalia adscendens and Paspalum conjugatum.
