= Cosmopterix issikiella =

Scientific classification
- Kingdom: Animalia
- Phylum: Arthropoda
- Class: Insecta
- Order: Lepidoptera
- Family: Cosmopterigidae
- Genus: Cosmopterix
- Species: C. issikiella

Binomial name
- Cosmopterix issikiella Kuroko, 1957

Species of moth

Cosmopterix issikiella is a moth of the family Cosmopterigidae. It is found in Taiwan.
