= Cosmopterix ingeniosa =

Scientific classification
- Kingdom: Animalia
- Phylum: Arthropoda
- Class: Insecta
- Order: Lepidoptera
- Family: Cosmopterigidae
- Genus: Cosmopterix
- Species: C. ingeniosa

Binomial name
- Cosmopterix ingeniosa Meyrick, 1909

Species of moth

Cosmopterix ingeniosa is a moth of the family Cosmopterigidae. It is known from India.
