= Cosmopterix semnota =

Scientific classification
- Kingdom: Animalia
- Phylum: Arthropoda
- Class: Insecta
- Order: Lepidoptera
- Family: Cosmopterigidae
- Genus: Cosmopterix
- Species: C. semnota

Binomial name
- Cosmopterix semnota Meyrick, 1914

Synonyms
- Cosmopteryx semnota

Species of moth

Cosmopterix semnota is a moth in the family Cosmopterigidae. It is found in India.
