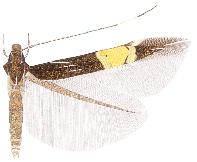

Scientific classification
- Kingdom: Animalia
- Phylum: Arthropoda
- Clade: Pancrustacea
- Class: Insecta
- Order: Lepidoptera
- Family: Cosmopterigidae
- Genus: Cosmopterix
- Species: C. navarroi

Binomial name
- Cosmopterix navarroi Koster, 2010

= Cosmopterix navarroi =

Species of moth

Cosmopterix navarroi is a moth of the family Cosmopterigidae. It is known from Tucumán, Argentina.

Adults have been recorded in the month of November.

== Description ==
Male. Forewing length 3.9 mm. Head: frons shining silvery white, vertex shining pale brown, neck tufts dark brown, laterally lined white, collar shining dark brown; labial palpus first segment very short, white, second segment three-fifths of the length of third, shining white on inside, dark brown with white longitudinal line on outside, third segment white, lined dark brown laterally; scape dorsally shining dark brown with a white anterior and a pale brown posterior line, ventrally shining white, antenna shining dark brown, with a white line from base to one-half, followed towards apex by approximately eight dark brown segments, eight white and approximately ten dark brown segments at apex. Thorax shining dark brown with a short white median line at posterior end, tegulae shining dark brown, narrowly lined white inwardly. Legs: femora ochreous-grey, tibiae and tarsi shining dark brown, foreleg with a white line on tibia and tarsal segments one to three, segment five entirely white, tibia of midleg with a white oblique basal line and white medial and apical rings, tarsal segments one and two with white apical rings, segment five entirely white, tibia of hindleg as midleg, tarsal segment one with a white basal ring, segments three to five dorsally white, spurs brownish grey, tips ochreous. Forewing shining dark brown, three narrow white lines in the basal area, a subcostal from one-sixth to one-third, bending from costa and slightly longer than the other two, a medial just above fold, from the middle of the subcostal to just beyond it, a subdorsal as long as the medial, but further from base, a bright yellow transverse fascia beyond the middle, narrowed towards dorsum, edged brownish grey at costa, bordered at the inner edge by an outward oblique tubercular pale golden metallic fascia with a small blackish brown subcostal spot on the outside, bordered at the outer edge by a similarly coloured, but inwardly oblique, fascia, narrowed in middle and dark brown edged on the inside, the outer tubercular fascia on costa with a white costal streak, a shining white apical line from the distal half of the apical area, interrupted before the cilia, the shorter inner part downwardly bent, cilia dark brown around apex, paler towards dorsum. Hindwing shining brown, cilia brown. Underside: forewing shining dark greyish brown, the white costal streak and apical line visible, hindwing shining dark greyish brown. Abdomen shining greyish brown with orange brown spots dorsally, last three segments greyish white banded posteriorly, ventrally shining yellowish white, anal tuft shining brownish grey.

== Etymology ==
The species is dedicated to Dr Fernando Navarro from Tucumán, Argentina, honouring his collaboration with the Netherlands Entomological Expedition to the north of Argentina in 1995 and 1996.
