= Cosmopterix trilopha =

Scientific classification
- Domain: Eukaryota
- Kingdom: Animalia
- Phylum: Arthropoda
- Class: Insecta
- Order: Lepidoptera
- Family: Cosmopterigidae
- Genus: Cosmopterix
- Species: C. trilopha

Binomial name
- Cosmopterix trilopha Meyrick, 1922

Synonyms
- Cosmopterix rhabdophanes Meyrick, 1928

Species of moth

Cosmopterix trilopha is a moth species of the family Cosmopterigidae which was first described in 1922 by Edward Meyrick. Its type locality is in Uganda; the species is additionally known from Malawi, Kenya and Ethiopia.
