= Cosmopterix epismaragda =

Scientific classification
- Kingdom: Animalia
- Phylum: Arthropoda
- Class: Insecta
- Order: Lepidoptera
- Family: Cosmopterigidae
- Genus: Cosmopterix
- Species: C. epismaragda

Binomial name
- Cosmopterix epismaragda Meyrick, 1932

Species of moth

Cosmopterix epismaragda is a moth in the family Cosmopterigidae. It was described by Edward Meyrick in 1932. It is found in Ethiopia.
