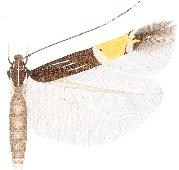

Scientific classification
- Kingdom: Animalia
- Phylum: Arthropoda
- Class: Insecta
- Order: Lepidoptera
- Family: Cosmopterigidae
- Genus: Cosmopterix
- Species: C. erasmia

Binomial name
- Cosmopterix erasmia Meyrick, 1915

= Cosmopterix erasmia =

Species of moth

Cosmopterix erasmia is a moth of the family Cosmopterigidae. It is known from the Brazil (Amazonas, Pará) and Guyana.

Adults have been collected in February, April and October, indicating at least two generations.

== Description ==
Male, female. Forewing length 2.8-3.3 mm. Head: frons shining greyish white with greenish and reddish reflections, vertex shining dark brown, laterally and medially lined white, collar shining dark brown; labial palpus first segment very short, ochreous, second segment four-fifths of the length of third, shining white on inside, dark brown with white longitudinal lines on outside and ventrally, third segment white, lined brown laterally, extreme apex white; scape dorsally shining dark brown with a white anterior line, ventrally shining white; antenna shining dark brown with a white interrupted line from base to three-fifths, near base a short uninterrupted section, followed towards apex by four white segments, two dark brown, two white, ten dark brown, five white and two dark grey segments at apex. Thorax and tegulae shining dark brown, thorax with a white median line, tegulae lined white inwardly. Legs: shining dark brown, foreleg with a white line on tibia and tarsal segments, tibia of midleg with white oblique basal and medial lines and a white apical ring, tarsal segments one, two and five with white longitudinal lines, tibia of hindleg with oblique silver metallic basal and medial lines, a pale golden subapical ring and a white apical ring, tarsal segment one with a silver metallic basal ring and greyish apical ring, segment two and three with grey apical rings, segments four and five entirely whitish, spurs white dorsally, brown ventrally. Forewing shining dark brown with reddish gloss, five narrow white lines in the basal area, a short costal from one-third to the transverse fascia, a subcostal from one-seventh to the start of the costal, a short medial from the middle of the subcostal, a subdorsal slightly further from base than the medial and equal in length to the subcostal, a dorsal from one-eighth to one-quarter, a bright orange-yellow transverse fascia beyond the middle, narrowing towards dorsum with an apical protrusion, bordered at the inner edge by a tubercular very pale golden metallic fascia with violet reflection, subcostally on outside with a small patch of blackish scales, bordered at the outer edge by two tubercular very pale golden metallic costal and dorsal spots with violet reflection, the dorsal spot about twice as large as the costal and more towards base, both spots inwardly lined dark brown, the costal outwardly edged by a white costal streak, apical line reduced to a silver metallic spot in the middle of the apical area and a shining white streak in the cilia at apex, cilia dark brown, paler towards dorsum. Hindwing shining greyish brown, cilia dark greyish brown. Underside: forewing shining dark greyish brown, the white costal streak indistinctly and the white streak at apex distinctly visible, hindwing shining greyish brown. Abdomen dorsally dark brown with reddish gloss, laterally shining dark brown with golden reflection, ventrally shining ochreous-white, anal tuft pale ochreous with golden reflection.
