= Cosmopterix diplozona =

Scientific classification
- Kingdom: Animalia
- Phylum: Arthropoda
- Class: Insecta
- Order: Lepidoptera
- Family: Cosmopterigidae
- Genus: Cosmopterix
- Species: C. diplozona

Binomial name
- Cosmopterix diplozona Meyrick, 1921

Species of moth

Cosmopterix diplozona is a moth in the family Cosmopterigidae. It was described by Edward Meyrick in 1921. It is found in South Africa.
