= Cosmopterix chalcelata =

Scientific classification
- Kingdom: Animalia
- Phylum: Arthropoda
- Class: Insecta
- Order: Lepidoptera
- Family: Cosmopterigidae
- Genus: Cosmopterix
- Species: C. chalcelata

Binomial name
- Cosmopterix chalcelata (Turner, 1923)

Synonyms
- Cosmopteryx chalcelata Turner, 1923

Species of moth

Cosmopterix chalcelata is a moth of the family Cosmopterigidae. It is known from Australia.
