= Cosmopterix plesiasta =

Scientific classification
- Kingdom: Animalia
- Phylum: Arthropoda
- Class: Insecta
- Order: Lepidoptera
- Family: Cosmopterigidae
- Genus: Cosmopterix
- Species: C. plesiasta

Binomial name
- Cosmopterix plesiasta Meyrick, 1919

Species of moth

Cosmopterix plesiasta is a moth of the family Cosmopterigidae. It is known from Thailand and India.
