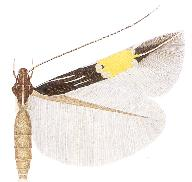

Scientific classification
- Kingdom: Animalia
- Phylum: Arthropoda
- Class: Insecta
- Order: Lepidoptera
- Family: Cosmopterigidae
- Genus: Cosmopterix
- Species: C. citrinopa

Binomial name
- Cosmopterix citrinopa (Meyrick, 1915)

= Cosmopterix citrinopa =

Species of moth

Cosmopterix citrinopa is a moth of the family Cosmopterigidae. It is known from Peru (Amazonas, Lima).

Adults were collected in March and August.

== Description ==
Male, female. Forewing length 3-3.9 mm. Head: frons shining greyish white with greenish reflection, vertex and neck tufts shining dark olive brown, laterally and medially lined white, collar shining dark olive brown; labial palpus first segment very short, white, second segment three-quarters of the length of third, dark brown, inner side and ventrally greyish white and a white longitudinal line on outside, third segment white, lined dark brown laterally; scape dorsally shining dark brown with a white anterior line, ventrally shining white, antenna shining dark brown with a white line from base to one-half, interrupted from beyond base, followed by an annulated section to two-thirds, followed towards apex by three dark brown segments, two white, ten dark brown and seven white segments at apex. Thorax and tegulae shining dark olive brown, thorax with a white median line, tegulae lined white inwardly. Legs: shining dark brown, foreleg with a white line on tibia and tarsal segments one to three, segment five entirely white, tibia of midleg with white oblique basal and medial lines and a white apical ring, tarsal segments one to four with whitish apical rings, segment five entirely white, hindlegs missing, spurs white dorsally, brown ventrally. Forewing shining dark brown with reddish gloss, five narrow white lines in the basal area, a short costal from two-fifths to the transverse fascia, a subcostal from base to one-third and strongly bending from costa before one-half, a medial from one-fifth to two-fifths, a subdorsal, as long as the medial, but slightly further from base, a dorsal from base to two-fifths, a pale orange-yellow transverse fascia beyond the middle, slightly narrowing towards dorsum and with a narrow apical protrusion, bordered at the inner edge by two tubercular pale golden metallic subcostal and subdorsal spots, the subcostal spot with a patch of blackish scales on the outside, and the subdorsal spot further from base than the subcostal, both spots almost conjoined, bordered at the outer edge by two tubercular pale golden metallic costal and dorsal spots, the dorsal spot twice as large as the costal and more towards base, both spots inwardly lined dark brown, outer costal spot outwardly edged by a white costal streak, a narrow shining white apical line from the apical protrusion to apex, cilia dark brown, paler towards dorsum. Hindwing shining brownish grey, cilia brown. Underside: forewing shining dark greyish brown, the transverse fascia and white costal streak indistinctly, a white streak at apex distinctly visible, hindwing shining brownish grey. Abdomen dorsally dark greyish brown with greenish and reddish reflections, segments six and seven banded lighter posteriorly, ventrally shining dark greyish brown, segments broad banded yellowish white posteriorly, anal tuft ochreous-white.
