= Cosmopterix latilineata =

Scientific classification
- Kingdom: Animalia
- Phylum: Arthropoda
- Class: Insecta
- Order: Lepidoptera
- Family: Cosmopterigidae
- Genus: Cosmopterix
- Species: C. latilineata

Binomial name
- Cosmopterix latilineata Kuroko, 1987

Species of moth

Cosmopterix latilineata is a moth of the family Cosmopterigidae. It is known from Thailand and the Philippines.
