= Cosmopterix acutivalva =

Scientific classification
- Kingdom: Animalia
- Phylum: Arthropoda
- Class: Insecta
- Order: Lepidoptera
- Family: Cosmopterigidae
- Genus: Cosmopterix
- Species: C. acutivalva

Binomial name
- Cosmopterix acutivalva Kuroko, 1987

Species of moth from Thailand

Cosmopterix acutivalva is a moth of the family Cosmopterigidae. It is known from Thailand.
