= Cosmopterix pocsi =

Scientific classification
- Kingdom: Animalia
- Phylum: Arthropoda
- Clade: Pancrustacea
- Class: Insecta
- Order: Lepidoptera
- Family: Cosmopterigidae
- Genus: Cosmopterix
- Species: C. pocsi

Binomial name
- Cosmopterix pocsi Sinev, 1988

Species of moth

Cosmopterix pocsi is a moth in the family Cosmopterigidae.
