= Cosmopterix flavidella =

Scientific classification
- Kingdom: Animalia
- Phylum: Arthropoda
- Class: Insecta
- Order: Lepidoptera
- Family: Cosmopterigidae
- Genus: Cosmopterix
- Species: C. flavidella

Binomial name
- Cosmopterix flavidella Kuroko, 2011

Species of moth

Cosmopterix flavidella is a moth of the family Cosmopterigidae. It is found on the islands of Honshu and Kyushu in Japan, and in Taiwan and Jiangxi, China.

The length of the forewings is 4–6 mm.
