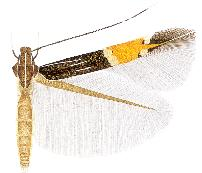

Scientific classification
- Kingdom: Animalia
- Phylum: Arthropoda
- Class: Insecta
- Order: Lepidoptera
- Family: Cosmopterigidae
- Genus: Cosmopterix
- Species: C. inaugurata

Binomial name
- Cosmopterix inaugurata Meyrick, 1922

= Cosmopterix inaugurata =

Species of moth

Cosmopterix inaugurata is a moth of the family Cosmopterigidae. It is known from Brazil (Pará) and Guyana.

Adults have been recorded in April and November.

== Description ==
Male. Forewing length 3.7 4.2 mm. Head: frons shining greyish white, vertex and neck tufts shining dark bronze brown, laterally and medially lined white, collar shining dark bronze brown; labial palpus first segment very short, white, second segment four-fifths of the length of third, dark brown with white longitudinal lines laterally and ventrally, third segment white, lined brown laterally; scape dorsally shining dark brown with a white anterior line, ventrally shining white, antenna shining dark brown with a white line from base to three-fifths, interrupted distally, followed towards apex by two white segments, two dark brown, two white, ten dark brown and seven white segments at apex. Thorax shining dark brown, tegulae bronze brown, thorax with a white median line, tegulae lined white inwardly. Legs: shining dark brown, femora of midleg and hindleg shining golden grey, foreleg with a white line on tibia and tarsal segments, but interrupted on segment three, tibia of midleg with a white oblique basal streak and white medial and apical rings, tibia of hindleg as midleg but with an additional subapical white ring, tarsal segments of midleg with white apical rings on segments one, two and four, segment five entirely white, tarsal segments of hindleg with white apical rings on segments one to three, segments four and five entirely white, spurs white dorsally, brownish ventrally. Forewing shining dark brown with reddish gloss, five narrow white lines in the basal area, a short costal just before the transverse fascia, a subcostal from base to one-third, gradually bending from costa, a short medial above fold from one-quarter to just beyond the subcostal, a subdorsal about as long as the medial, but slightly further from base, a dorsal from base to one-quarter, a bright yellowish orange transverse fascia beyond the middle, narrowing towards dorsum and with a long and narrow apical protrusion, bordered at the inner edge by a slightly outward oblique tubercular pale golden metallic fascia with a small subcostal patch of blackish scales on the outside, bordered at the outer edge by two tubercular pale golden metallic costal and dorsal spots, the dorsal spot slightly larger than the costal and more towards base, both spots with a dark brown inward lining, the costal spot outwardly edged by a white costal streak, a narrow white apical line from the apical protrusion, cilia dark brown, paler towards dorsum. Hindwing shining dark brownish grey, cilia greyish brown. Underside: forewing shining dark greyish brown, the white apical line distinctly visible, hindwing shining dark greyish brown. Abdomen dorsally ochreous, laterally shining pale golden, ventrally shining white, anal tuft yellowish white.
