= Cosmopterix complicata =

Scientific classification
- Kingdom: Animalia
- Phylum: Arthropoda
- Class: Insecta
- Order: Lepidoptera
- Family: Cosmopterigidae
- Genus: Cosmopterix
- Species: C. complicata

Binomial name
- Cosmopterix complicata Kuroko, 1987

Species of moth

Cosmopterix complicata is a moth of the family Cosmopterigidae. It is known to originate from Thailand.
