= Cosmopterix antemidora =

Scientific classification
- Domain: Eukaryota
- Kingdom: Animalia
- Phylum: Arthropoda
- Class: Insecta
- Order: Lepidoptera
- Family: Cosmopterigidae
- Genus: Cosmopterix
- Species: C. antemidora

Binomial name
- Cosmopterix antemidora Meyrick, 1909

Synonyms
- Cosmopteryx antemidora

Moth in the family Cosmopterigidae, commonly found in India

Cosmopterix antemidora is a moth in the family Cosmopterigidae. It was described by Edward Meyrick in 1909. It is found in Kodagu district of India.
