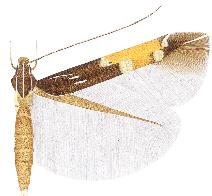

Scientific classification
- Kingdom: Animalia
- Phylum: Arthropoda
- Class: Insecta
- Order: Lepidoptera
- Family: Cosmopterigidae
- Genus: Cosmopterix
- Species: C. chalybaeella

Binomial name
- Cosmopterix chalybaeella Walsingham, 1889

= Cosmopterix chalybaeella =

Species of moth

Cosmopterix chalybaeella is a moth of the family Cosmopterigidae. It is known from the United States in Texas and New Mexico.

Adults were collected in April.

== Description ==
Male. Forewing length 3.8 mm. Head: frons shining ochreous-white with greenish and reddish reflections, vertex bronze brown, neck tufts dark bronze brown with reddish gloss, laterally and medially lined white, collar dark bronze brown; labial palpus first segment very short, white, second segment three-quarters of the length of third, dark brown with white longitudinal lines laterally and ventrally, third segment white, dark brown lined laterally; scape dorsally shining dark brown with a white anterior line, ventrally shining white, antenna shining dark brown with a white line from base to beyond one-half, followed towards apex by six or seven dark brown segments, two white, two dark brown, two white, 10 dark brown and nine white segments at apex. Thorax and tegulae shining dark bronze brown with reddish gloss, thorax with a white median line, tegulae lined white inwardly. Legs: only forelegs present, both too worn to describe. Forewing dark bronze brown with reddish gloss, four white lines in the basal area, a narrow subcostal from beyond base to one-fifth, bending from costa in distal half, a very short and thick medial above fold, below the distal end of the subcostal, a subdorsal, similar to the medial but slightly longer, below fold and slightly further from base as the medial, a narrow dorsal from beyond base to the basal end of the subdorsal, a broad yellow transverse fascia beyond the middle, strongly narrowed in dorsal half and in dorsal half darkened by grey scales, bordered at the inner edge by two silver metallic, tubercular costal and dorsal spots, the costal spot outwardly edged by a patch of blackish brown scales, the dorsal spot much further from base and about twice as large as the costal, bordered at the outer edge by similarly coloured costal and dorsal spots, the outer dorsal spot three times as large as the outer costal and more towards base, both spots partly lined dark brown inwardly, the outer costal outwardly edged by a narrow white costal streak, a narrow white apical line from distal half of the apical area to apex, cilia dark brown around apex, paler towards dorsum. Hindwing shining dark brownish grey. Underside: forewing shining greyish brown, hindwing shining greyish brown in costal half, shining grey in dorsal half. Abdomen dorsally ochreous-brown, ventrally paler, anal tuft yellowish white, abdomen greased, proper description not possible.
