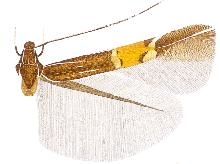

Scientific classification
- Kingdom: Animalia
- Phylum: Arthropoda
- Class: Insecta
- Order: Lepidoptera
- Family: Cosmopterigidae
- Genus: Cosmopterix
- Species: C. ochleria

Binomial name
- Cosmopterix ochleria Walsingham, 1909

= Cosmopterix ochleria =

Species of moth

Cosmopterix ochleria is a moth of the family Cosmopterigidae. It is known from Tabasco, Mexico.

Adults have been recorded in March.

== Description ==
Female. Forewing length 3.8 mm. Head: frons shining greyish white with greenish gloss, vertex and neck tufts greyish brown, laterally and medially very narrowly lined white, collar greyish brown; labial palpus first segment very short, white, second segment three-quarters of the length of third, shining dark grey with white longitudinal lines laterally and ventrally, third segment white, lined dark brown laterally; scape dark brown with a white anterior line, antenna dark brown with white line from base to two-fifths, distal part interrupted, followed towards apex by a short annulate section, five dark brown segments, two white, two dark brown, two white, ten dark brown and eight white segments at apex. Thorax and tegulae greyish brown, tegulae lined white inwardly. Legs: dark brown, femora shining pale ochreous grey, foreleg with a white line on tibia and tarsal segments one, two and four, five entirely white, tibia of midleg with white basal and medial streaks and a white apical ring, tarsal segment one and two with white apical rings, segments four and five entirely white, tibia of hindleg as midleg but with an additional white subapical ring, tarsal segment one with white basal and apical rings, segment two with a white apical ring, segments four and five entirely white, spurs dark grey, whitish at apex. Forewing greyish brown, five white lines in the basal area, a costal from one-third to the transverse fascia, a subcostal from near base to one-quarter, slightly bending from costa, a very short medial, underneath the end of the subcostal, a subdorsal from one-fifth to the middle of the costal, a dorsal from base to the start of the subdorsal, a greyish yellow transverse fascia beyond the middle, its inner edge bordered by a tubercular pale golden metallic fascia, not reaching costa, and with a small and a larger blackish spot at the outside, bordered on the outer edge by two tubercular pale golden metallic costal and dorsal spots, both spots opposite, the dorsal spot about four times larger than the costal, both spots lined greyish brown inwardly, the costal spot edged by a narrow white costal streak, a white, sometimes interrupted, apical line from beyond the transverse fascia, cilia greyish brown around apex, paler towards dorsum, hindwing dark grey, cilia greyish brown. Underside: forewing greyish brown, the costal streak visible as a yellow spot and a white spot in apical cilia, hindwing greyish brown.
