= Cosmopterix brachyclina =

Scientific classification
- Kingdom: Animalia
- Phylum: Arthropoda
- Class: Insecta
- Order: Lepidoptera
- Family: Cosmopterigidae
- Genus: Cosmopterix
- Species: C. brachyclina

Binomial name
- Cosmopterix brachyclina Meyrick, 1933

Species of moth

Cosmopterix brachyclina is a moth of the family Cosmopterigidae. It is endemic to Taiwan.

The wingspan is 10 mm (0.39 in) for the holotype, a male.
