= Cosmopterix ancalodes =

Scientific classification
- Kingdom: Animalia
- Phylum: Arthropoda
- Class: Insecta
- Order: Lepidoptera
- Family: Cosmopterigidae
- Genus: Cosmopterix
- Species: C. ancalodes

Binomial name
- Cosmopterix ancalodes Meyrick, 1919

Synonyms
- Cosmopteryx ancalodes

Species of moth from India

Cosmopterix ancalodes is a moth in the family Cosmopterigidae. It was described by Edward Meyrick in 1919. It is found in India.
