= Cosmopterix chlorochalca =

Scientific classification
- Kingdom: Animalia
- Phylum: Arthropoda
- Class: Insecta
- Order: Lepidoptera
- Family: Cosmopterigidae
- Genus: Cosmopterix
- Species: C. chlorochalca

Binomial name
- Cosmopterix chlorochalca (Meyrick, 1915)

Synonyms
- Cosmopteryx chlorochalca Meyrick, 1915

Species of moth

Cosmopterix chlorochalca is a moth of the family Cosmopterigidae. It is known from Australia.
