= Cosmopterix gramineella =

Scientific classification
- Kingdom: Animalia
- Phylum: Arthropoda
- Class: Insecta
- Order: Lepidoptera
- Family: Cosmopterigidae
- Genus: Cosmopterix
- Species: C. gramineella

Binomial name
- Cosmopterix gramineella Kuroko, 1987

Species of moth

Cosmopterix gramineella is a moth of the family Cosmopterigidae. It is known from Thailand.
