= Cosmopterix calliochra =

Scientific classification
- Kingdom: Animalia
- Phylum: Arthropoda
- Class: Insecta
- Order: Lepidoptera
- Family: Cosmopterigidae
- Genus: Cosmopterix
- Species: C. calliochra

Binomial name
- Cosmopterix calliochra (Turner, 1926)

Synonyms
- Cosmopteryx calliochra Turner, 1926

Species of moth

Cosmopterix calliochra is a moth of the family Cosmopterigidae. It is known from Australia.
