= Cosmopterix jiangxiella =

Scientific classification
- Kingdom: Animalia
- Phylum: Arthropoda
- Clade: Pancrustacea
- Class: Insecta
- Order: Lepidoptera
- Family: Cosmopterigidae
- Genus: Cosmopterix
- Species: C. jiangxiella

Binomial name
- Cosmopterix jiangxiella Kuroko & Y.Q. Liu, 2005

Species of moth

Cosmopterix jiangxiella is a moth of the family Cosmopterigidae. It is found in Jiangxi, China.

The length of the forewings is about 4.7 mm (male holotype).
