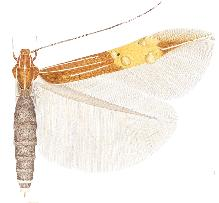

Scientific classification
- Kingdom: Animalia
- Phylum: Arthropoda
- Clade: Pancrustacea
- Class: Insecta
- Order: Lepidoptera
- Family: Cosmopterigidae
- Genus: Cosmopterix
- Species: C. pentachorda

Binomial name
- Cosmopterix pentachorda Meyrick, 1915

= Cosmopterix pentachorda =

Species of moth

Cosmopterix pentachorda is a moth of the family Cosmopterigidae. It is known from Ecuador and Peru.

Adults have been recorded in June and August.

== Description ==
Male, female. Forewing length 3.8-4.2 mm. Head: frons shining ochreous-white with reddish reflection, vertex and neck tufts shining greyish brown with reddish gloss, laterally and medially lined white, lateral lines narrow, collar shining greyish brown; labial palpus first segment very short, white, second segment three-quarters of the length of third, dark brown with white longitudinal lines laterally and ventrally, third segment white, lined brown laterally, extreme apex white; scape dorsally shining dark brown with a white anterior line, ventrally shining white, antenna shining dark brown with a short white line from base changing to an interrupted section to two-fifths, followed towards apex by approximately six dark brown segments, seven more or less white, two dark brown, two white, six dark brown, three white and two dark brown segments at apex. Thorax and tegulae shining greyish brown with reddish gloss, thorax with a white median line, tegulae lined white inwardly. Legs: shining dark greyish brown, foreleg with a white line on tibia and tarsal segments, interrupted on segment three and base of segment four, femora of midleg and hindleg shining ochreous-white, tibia of midleg with white oblique basal and medial lines and a white apical ring, tarsal segments one, two and four with whitish apical rings, segment five entirely white, tibia of hindleg with a very oblique white line from base to two-thirds and a white apical ring, tarsi similar to midleg, spurs white dorsally, brown ventrally. Forewing shining greyish brown with reddish gloss, four narrow white lines in the basal area, a subcostal, nearly at costa, from base to just before one-half, slightly bending from costa, a medial from base and slightly longer than the costal, a slightly oblique subdorsal from one-sixth to near the transverse fascia, a dorsal from one-eighth to the end of medial, a bright yellow transverse fascia beyond the middle with a broad prolongation towards apex and with a very short apical protrusion, bordered at the inner edge by two tubercular pale golden metallic subcostal and subdorsal spots, the subcostal spot with a patch of blackish scales on the outside, the subdorsal spot somewhat larger and further from base than the subcostal and not at the inner edge of The transverse fascia, at two-thirds of the transverse fascia two tubercular pale golden costal and dorsal spots, both spots opposite, the costal spot edged greyish brown on the inside, the dorsal spot more than twice as large as the costal, from the outer costal spot a short white costal streak, a shining white apical line from the dorsal side of the apical protrusion, cilia brown at apex, ochreous-brown towards dorsum. Hindwing shining pale grey, cilia ochreous-brown. Underside: forewing shining brownish grey, the white apical line distinctly visible, hindwing shining pale grey. Abdomen dorsally dark brownish grey, segment six banded whitish posteriorly, ventrally shining ochreous, anal tuft yellowish white.
