= Cosmopterix lautissimella =

Scientific classification
- Kingdom: Animalia
- Phylum: Arthropoda
- Clade: Pancrustacea
- Class: Insecta
- Order: Lepidoptera
- Family: Cosmopterigidae
- Genus: Cosmopterix
- Species: C. lautissimella

Binomial name
- Cosmopterix lautissimella Amsel, 1968

Species of moth

Cosmopterix lautissimella is a moth in the family Cosmopterigidae. It was described by Hans Georg Amsel in 1968. It is found in Pakistan.
