= Cosmopterix transcissa =

Scientific classification
- Kingdom: Animalia
- Phylum: Arthropoda
- Class: Insecta
- Order: Lepidoptera
- Family: Cosmopterigidae
- Genus: Cosmopterix
- Species: C. transcissa

Binomial name
- Cosmopterix transcissa Meyrick, 1914

Species of moth

Cosmopterix transcissa is a moth in the family Cosmopterigidae. It is found in Malawi.
