= Cosmopterix hieraspis =

Scientific classification
- Kingdom: Animalia
- Phylum: Arthropoda
- Class: Insecta
- Order: Lepidoptera
- Family: Cosmopterigidae
- Genus: Cosmopterix
- Species: C. hieraspis

Binomial name
- Cosmopterix hieraspis Meyrick, 1924

Synonyms
- Cosmopteryx hieraspis

Species of moth

Cosmopterix hieraspis is a moth in the family Cosmopterigidae. It was described by Edward Meyrick in 1924. It is found in India.
