= Cosmopterix vexillaris =

Scientific classification
- Kingdom: Animalia
- Phylum: Arthropoda
- Class: Insecta
- Order: Lepidoptera
- Family: Cosmopterigidae
- Genus: Cosmopterix
- Species: C. vexillaris

Binomial name
- Cosmopterix vexillaris Meyrick, 1909

Synonyms
- Cosmopteryx vexillaris

Species of moth

Cosmopterix vexillaris is a moth in the family Cosmopterigidae. It is found in India.
