= Cosmopterix nonna =

Scientific classification
- Domain: Eukaryota
- Kingdom: Animalia
- Phylum: Arthropoda
- Class: Insecta
- Order: Lepidoptera
- Family: Cosmopterigidae
- Genus: Cosmopterix
- Species: C. nonna

Binomial name
- Cosmopterix nonna Clarke, 1986

Species of moth

Cosmopterix nonna is a moth in the family Cosmopterigidae. It was described by John Frederick Gates Clarke in 1986. It is found on the Marquesas Islands.
