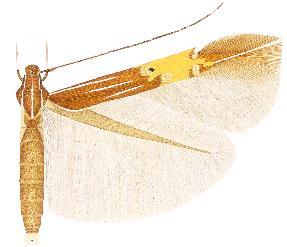

Scientific classification
- Kingdom: Animalia
- Phylum: Arthropoda
- Class: Insecta
- Order: Lepidoptera
- Family: Cosmopterigidae
- Genus: Cosmopterix
- Species: C. delicatella

Binomial name
- Cosmopterix delicatella Walsingham, 1889

= Cosmopterix delicatella =

Species of moth

Cosmopterix delicatella is a moth of the family Cosmopterigidae. It is known from North Carolina, United States, but is possibly more widespread.

== Description ==
Male. Forewing length 4.9 mm. Head: frons shining pale ochreous-grey with greenish and reddish reflections, vertex and neck tufts shining greyish ochreous-brown with reddish reflection, laterally and medially lined white, collar ochreous-brown; labial palpus first segment very short, white, second segment four-fifths of the length of third, greyish brown with white longitudinal lines laterally and ventrally, third segment white, lined dark brown laterally; scape brown with a white anterior line, white ventrally, antenna greyish brown with a white line from base to one-quarter, changing into an interrupted line to two-thirds, interruptions in middle often indistinct or partly absent, followed towards apex by respectively a more or less greyish brown part of approximately ten segments, one white, two dark brown, two white, ten greyish brown, four white and four greyish brown segments at apex. Thorax greyish brown with a white median line; tegulae greyish brown, lined white inwardly. Legs: foreleg brownish grey with a white line on tibia and tarsal segments one, two, basal half of three and five, midlegs absent, femur of hindleg ochreous-white, remaining parts ochreous grey, tibia of hindleg with oblique basal and medial white lines and a white apical ring, tarsal segments with a dorsal white line, interrupted in the basal half of segment one, spurs white, ventrally ochreous-grey. Forewing greyish brown, four rather broad white lines in the basal area, a subcostal from base to one-third, slightly bending from costa, a medial above fold, from one-sixth and ending just before the transverse fascia, a subdorsal below fold, from one-quarter and ending just beyond the medial line, a dorsal from base to one-third, a broad yellow transverse fascia beyond the middle, slightly narrowing dorsally and with an irregular apical protrusion, bordered by four pale golden metallic, tubercular spots near or at costa and dorsum, on the inner edge by a subcostal spot, outwardly edged by a patch of blackish brown scales and by a subdorsal spot, similar in size but further from base than the subcostal, both outer spots of different size, the dorsal spot about twice as large as the costal and both spots almost opposite and greyish brown edged inwardly, a white costal streak from the outer costal spot and a shining white apical line from the apical protrusion to apex, cilia greyish brown, ochreous-grey towards dorsum. Hindwing shining brownish grey, cilia ochreous-grey. Underside: forewing shining greyish brown, the white apical line distinctly visible, hindwing shining greyish brown. Abdomen dorsally shining golden brown with some reddish gloss, ventrally shining grey mixed yellowish white, segments broadly banded yellowish white posteriorly, anal tuft yellowish white.
