= Cosmopterix diandra =

Scientific classification
- Domain: Eukaryota
- Kingdom: Animalia
- Phylum: Arthropoda
- Class: Insecta
- Order: Lepidoptera
- Family: Cosmopterigidae
- Genus: Cosmopterix
- Species: C. diandra

Binomial name
- Cosmopterix diandra (J. F. G. Clarke, 1986)

Synonyms
- Asymphorodes diandra Clarke, 1986

Species of moth

Cosmopterix diandra is a moth in the family Cosmopterigidae. It was described by John Frederick Gates Clarke in 1986. It is found on the Marquesas Islands.
