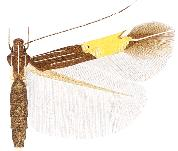

Scientific classification
- Kingdom: Animalia
- Phylum: Arthropoda
- Clade: Pancrustacea
- Class: Insecta
- Order: Lepidoptera
- Family: Cosmopterigidae
- Genus: Cosmopterix
- Species: C. langmaidi

Binomial name
- Cosmopterix langmaidi Koster, 2010

= Cosmopterix langmaidi =

Species of moth

Cosmopterix langmaidi is a moth of the family Cosmopterigidae. It is known from Belize.

Adults have been recorded in April.

== Description ==
Female. Forewing length 3.5 mm. Head: frons shining ochreous-white with purplish reflection, vertex and neck tufts dark brown, medially and laterally lined white, collar dark brown; labial palpus first segment very short, white, second segment three-quarters of the length of third, dark brown with white longitudinal lines laterally and ventrally, third segment white, lined brown laterally; scape dark brown with a white anterior line, white ventrally, antenna shining brown, a white line from base to beyond one-half, followed towards apex by an annulated part of ten segments, two white, ten dark brown and approximately nine white segments at apex. Thorax and tegulae dark brown, thorax with a white median line, tegulae lined white inwardly. Legs: dark brown, femora of midleg and hindleg shining pale ochreous-grey, foreleg with a white line on tibia and tarsal segments, tibia of midleg with white oblique basal and medial lines and a white apical ring, tarsal segments one, two and four with white apical rings, segment five entirely white, tibia of hindleg as midleg, tarsal segment one with white basal and apical rings, segments two to four with white dorsal streaks, segment five entirely white, spurs white, ventrally with a greyish-brown streak. Forewing dark brown, five narrow white lines in the basal area, a short costal from one-third to the transverse fascia, a subcostal from base to one-third, bending inwardly in distal third, a medial above fold, starting beyond base and ending just before the transverse fascia, a subdorsal below fold, from one-fifth and ending just beyond the medial, a dorsal from beyond base to one-quarter, a broad yellow transverse fascia beyond the middle, narrowed towards dorsum with a short apical protrusion, bordered on the inner edge by two pale golden metallic tubercular subcostal and dorsal spots, the dorsal spot twice as large as the subcostal, the subcostal spot edged by a small patch of blackish brown scales on the outside and more towards base, bordered at the outer edge by two similarly coloured costal and dorsal spots, the dorsal spot more than twice as large as the costal spot and more towards base, the outer costal spot stretched and brownish edged on the inside, a white costal streak from outer costal spot, a shining white apical line from apical protrusion, cilia dark greyish brown around apex, ochreous-grey towards dorsum. Hindwing shining pale brownish grey, cilia ochreous-grey. Underside: forewing shining brown, the white apical line distinctly visible, hindwing shining pale grey. Abdomen dorsally dark brown, ventrally dark grey with a whitish longitudinal line, anal tuft yellowish white.

== Etymology ==
The species is dedicated to Dr John Langmaid, Southsea, England, in recognition of his linguistic corrections of the manuscript describing the new species.
