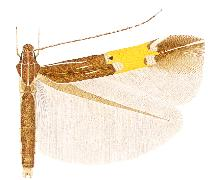

Scientific classification
- Kingdom: Animalia
- Phylum: Arthropoda
- Class: Insecta
- Order: Lepidoptera
- Family: Cosmopterigidae
- Genus: Cosmopterix
- Species: C. magophila

Binomial name
- Cosmopterix magophila Meyrick, 1919

= Cosmopterix magophila =

Species of moth

Cosmopterix magophila is a moth of the family Cosmopterigidae. It is known from the United States (North Carolina, Arkansas and Michigan) and the Dominican Republic.

Adults have been recorded in May, August and September.

== Description ==
Male. Forewing length 3.3-3.9 mm. Head: frons shining ochreous-grey with greenish and reddish reflections, vertex and neck tufts brown with reddish gloss, laterally and medially narrowly lined white, collar brown; labial palpus first segment very short, whitish, second segment four-fifths of the length of third, brown with white longitudinal lines laterally and ventrally, third segment white, lined dark brown laterally; scape dorsally shining dark brown with a white anterior line, ventrally shining white, antenna shining dark brown with a white line from base to beyond one-half, middle section interrupted, followed towards apex by five dark brown segments, two white, two dark brown, two white, ten dark brown and eight white segments at apex. Thorax and tegulae shining brown with reddish gloss, thorax with a white median line, tegulae lined white inwardly. Legs: dark greyish brown with reddish gloss, femora of midleg and hindleg shining pale ochreous, foreleg with a white line on tibia and tarsal segments one and two, four and five, tibia of midleg with white oblique basal and medial lines and a white apical ring, tarsal segments as foreleg, tibia of hindleg as midleg but with an additional ochreous-white oblique subapical line, tarsal segment one with white basal and apical spots, segments two and three with white apical spots, segments four and five dorsally white, spurs white, ventrally greyish brown. Forewing brown with reddish gloss, five white lines in the basal area, a short costal from one-third to the transverse fascia, a subcostal from base to one-quarter, bending from costa in distal half, a short medial above fold, ending just beyond the subcostal, a subdorsal, about as long as the medial, but slightly further from base, a dorsal from base to one-quarter, a broad yellow transverse fascia beyond the middle, and with a very small apical protrusion, bordered at the inner edge by two silver metallic tubercular subcostal and subdorsal spots, the subcostal spot edged by a small patch of blackish brown scales on the outside, the subdorsal spot slightly further from base and a little larger than the costal, bordered at the outer edge by two similar coloured costal and dorsal spots, the dorsal spot three times as large as the costal and more towards base, both spots partly lined brown inwardly, a white costal streak from the outer costal spot, and a narrow white apical line from or just beyond the apical protrusion, slightly widening in the apical cilia, cilia brown around apex, paler towards dorsum. Hindwing shining dark brownish grey. Underside: forewing shining pale greyish brown, the white apical line distinctly visible in the apical cilia, hindwing shining brownish grey. Abdomen dorsally greyish brown with reddish gloss, laterally grey with greenish reflection, ventrally shining yellowish white, anal tuft greyish white.
