= Cosmopterix iphigona =

Scientific classification
- Kingdom: Animalia
- Phylum: Arthropoda
- Class: Insecta
- Order: Lepidoptera
- Family: Cosmopterigidae
- Genus: Cosmopterix
- Species: C. iphigona

Binomial name
- Cosmopterix iphigona Meyrick, 1915

Synonyms
- Cosmopteryx iphigona

Species of moth

Cosmopterix iphigona is a moth in the family Cosmopterigidae. It was described by Edward Meyrick in 1915. It is found in Kodagu district of India.
