= Cosmopterix pallifasciella =

Scientific classification
- Kingdom: Animalia
- Phylum: Arthropoda
- Class: Insecta
- Order: Lepidoptera
- Family: Cosmopterigidae
- Genus: Cosmopterix
- Species: C. pallifasciella

Binomial name
- Cosmopterix pallifasciella Snellen, 1897

Synonyms
- Cosmopteryx pallifasciella

Species of moth

Cosmopterix pallifasciella is a moth in the family Cosmopterigidae. It was described by Snellen in 1897. It is found on Java.
