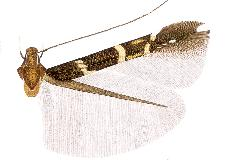

Scientific classification
- Kingdom: Animalia
- Phylum: Arthropoda
- Class: Insecta
- Order: Lepidoptera
- Family: Cosmopterigidae
- Genus: Cosmopterix
- Species: C. nyctiphanes

Binomial name
- Cosmopterix nyctiphanes Meyrick, 1915

= Cosmopterix nyctiphanes =

Species of moth

Cosmopterix nyctiphanes is a moth of the family Cosmopterigidae. It is known from Ecuador.

== Description ==
Forewing length 3.6 mm. Head: frons shining greyish white with golden reflection, vertex and neck tufts shining dark bronze brown with golden reflection, laterally lined white, collar shining dark bronze brown; labial palpus first segment very short, white, second segment three-quarters of the length of third, dark brown with white longitudinal lines laterally and ventrally, third segment white, lined dark brown laterally; scape dorsally dark brown with a white anterior line, ventrally white, antenna shining dark grey, subapical part with two greyish white rings of one segment each separated by one dark grey segment, followed by approximately 14 dark grey segments at apex. Thorax and tegulae shining dark bronze brown with golden reflection and reddish gloss. Legs: shining dark brown, foreleg with a white line on tibia and tarsal segments one and two, femora of midleg and hindleg shining golden brown, tibia of midleg with silver metallic oblique basal and medial lines with greenish reflection and a white apical ring, tarsal segments one, two and four with white apical rings, segment five entirely white, hindlegs missing, spurs shining dark brown, lined silver metallic. Forewing shining dark brown with reddish gloss, at one-fifth an irregular inwardly oblique pale golden metallic fascia with bluish gloss, fascia consisting of two short streaks of similar length with the costal of these two closest to base, and a dorsal streak which is twice as long as both other streaks, a broad, slightly outwardly bent, tubercular pale golden metallic fascia in the middle, a small pale golden metallic costal spot at three-quarters, edged by a short and broad white costal streak, a similarly coloured dorsal spot, more towards base and three times as large as the costal, some scattered yellow scales between pale golden fascia and the spots as a vestige of the yellow transverse fascia, apical line as a bluish silver spot in the middle of the apical area, preceded by two small streaks of silver scales and with a white spot in the apical cilia, cilia dark brown, paler on dorsum towards base. Hindwing shining dark greyish brown, cilia dark brown. Underside: forewing shining greyish brown with the white costal streak and apical spot distinctly visible, hindwing greyish brown.
