= Cosmopterix bichromella =

Scientific classification
- Kingdom: Animalia
- Phylum: Arthropoda
- Clade: Pancrustacea
- Class: Insecta
- Order: Lepidoptera
- Family: Cosmopterigidae
- Genus: Cosmopterix
- Species: C. bichromella

Binomial name
- Cosmopterix bichromella Sinev & Park, 1994

Species of moth

Cosmopterix bichromella is a moth in the family Cosmopterigidae. It was described by Sinev and Park in 1994. It is found on the Korean Peninsula.
