= Cosmopterix toraula =

Scientific classification
- Kingdom: Animalia
- Phylum: Arthropoda
- Class: Insecta
- Order: Lepidoptera
- Family: Cosmopterigidae
- Genus: Cosmopterix
- Species: C. toraula

Binomial name
- Cosmopterix toraula Meyrick, 1910

Synonyms
- Cosmopteryx toraula

Species of moth

Cosmopterix toraula is a moth in the family Cosmopterigidae. It is found on Borneo.
