= List of United Kingdom locations: Po-Poz =

The United Kingdom

This is part of the list of United Kingdom locations: a gazetteer of place names in the United Kingdom showing each place's locality and geographical coordinates.

== Poa-Pok ==
Location	Locality	Coordinates (links to map & photo sources)	OS grid reference
Pobgreen	Oldham	53.55°N 01.98°W	SE0106
Pochin Houses	Caerphilly	51.72°N 03.21°W	SO1604
Pocket Nook	Cheshire	53.46°N 02.54°W	SJ6497
Pockley	North Yorkshire	54.25°N 01.03°W	SE6385
Pocklington	East Riding of Yorkshire	53.93°N 00.78°W	SE8049
Pockthorpe (Thompson)	Norfolk	52.52°N 00.81°E	TL9196
Pockthorpe (Sparham)	Norfolk	52.72°N 01.06°E	TG0718
Pockthorpe (West Rudham)	Norfolk	52.81°N 00.68°E	TF8127
Pockthorpe (Foulsham)	Norfolk	52.77°N 01.00°E	TG0324
Pode Hole	Lincolnshire	52.78°N 00.20°W	TF2122
Podimore	Somerset	51.01°N 02.65°W	ST5424
Podington	Bedfordshire	52.24°N 00.62°W	SP9462
Podmoor	Worcestershire	52.34°N 02.20°W	SO8672
Podmore	Norfolk	52.67°N 00.88°E	TF9512
Podmore	Staffordshire	52.91°N 02.32°W	SJ7835
Podsmead	Gloucestershire	51.83°N 02.26°W	SO8215
Poffley End	Oxfordshire	51.80°N 01.49°W	SP3512
Pogmoor	Barnsley	53.55°N 01.51°W	SE3206
Point Clear	Essex	51.78°N 01.02°E	TM0914
Point Lynas	Isle of Anglesey	53.41°N 04.28°W	SH479928
Point of Ardnamurchan	Highland	56.72°N 06.21°W	NM424667
Point of Ayr	Flintshire	53.35°N 03.32°W	SJ116849
Point of Ayre	Isle of Man	54.41°N 04.37°W	NX463048
Point of Ayre	Orkney Islands	58.92°N 02.72°W	HY583042
Point of Buckquoy	Orkney Islands	59.13°N 03.32°W	HY243280
Point of Fethaland	Shetland Islands	60.63°N 01.31°W	HU374946
Point of Knap	Argyll and Bute	55.89°N 05.67°W	NR703728
Point of Sleat	Highland	57.02°N 06.01°W	NM563996
Point of Stoer	Highland	58.25°N 05.38°W	NC016346
Pointon	Lincolnshire	52.86°N 00.35°W	TF1131
Pokesdown	Bournemouth	50.72°N 01.83°W	SZ1292

== Pol ==
Location	Locality	Coordinates (links to map & photo sources)	OS grid reference
Polbain	Highland	58.03°N 05.40°W	NB9910
Polbathic	Cornwall	50.38°N 04.33°W	SX3456
Polbeth	West Lothian	55.85°N 03.56°W	NT0264
Polborder	Cornwall	50.45°N 04.28°W	SX3864
Polbrock	Cornwall	50.48°N 04.80°W	SX0169
Poldhu Point	Cornwall	50.02°N 05.25°W	SW667195
Polebrook	Northamptonshire	52.47°N 00.44°W	TL0687
Pole Elm	Worcestershire	52.13°N 02.24°W	SO8349
Polegate	East Sussex	50.81°N 00.24°E	TQ5804
Pole Moor	Kirklees	53.63°N 01.91°W	SE0615
Poles	Highland	57.90°N 04.06°W	NH7892
Polesden Lacey	Surrey	51.25°N 00.38°W	TQ1352
Poleshill	Somerset	50.99°N 03.31°W	ST0823
Polesworth	Warwickshire	52.61°N 01.61°W	SK2602
Polgear	Cornwall	50.17°N 05.25°W	SW6836
Polgigga	Cornwall	50.04°N 05.67°W	SW3723
Polglass	Highland	58.00°N 05.33°W	NC0307
Polgooth	Cornwall	50.31°N 04.82°W	SW9950
Poling	West Sussex	50.82°N 00.52°W	TQ0404
Poling Corner	West Sussex	50.83°N 00.52°W	TQ0405
Polkerris	Cornwall	50.33°N 04.68°W	SX0952
Polladras	Cornwall	50.12°N 05.34°W	SW6130
Pollard Street	Norfolk	52.83°N 01.45°E	TG3332
Pollhill	Kent	51.23°N 00.66°E	TQ8652
Poll Hill	Wirral	53.33°N 03.11°W	SJ2682
Pollington	East Riding of Yorkshire	53.66°N 01.07°W	SE6119
Polloch	Highland	56.75°N 05.61°W	NM7968
Pollok	City of Glasgow	55.82°N 04.34°W	NS5362
Pollokshaws	City of Glasgow	55.82°N 04.31°W	NS5561
Pollokshields	City of Glasgow	55.83°N 04.28°W	NS5763
Pollosgan	Highland	57.44°N 06.73°W	NG1649
Polmadie	City of Glasgow	55.83°N 04.25°W	NS5962
Polmaily	Highland	57.33°N 04.54°W	NH4730
Polmarth	Cornwall	50.17°N 05.22°W	SW7036
Polmassick	Cornwall	50.27°N 04.85°W	SW9745
Polmear	Cornwall	50.34°N 04.70°W	SX0853
Polmont	Falkirk	55.98°N 03.71°W	NS9378
Polmorla	Cornwall	50.50°N 04.85°W	SW9871
Polnessan	East Ayrshire	55.36°N 04.51°W	NS4111
Polnish	Highland	56.88°N 05.71°W	NM7483
Polopit	Northamptonshire	52.39°N 00.50°W	TL0279
Polpenwith	Cornwall	50.09°N 05.17°W	SW7327
Polpeor	Cornwall	50.17°N 05.48°W	SW5136
Polperro	Cornwall	50.32°N 04.53°W	SX2050
Polruan	Cornwall	50.31°N 04.64°W	SX1250
Polsham	Somerset	51.17°N 02.70°W	ST5142
Polsloe	Devon	50.72°N 03.51°W	SX9393
Polstead	Suffolk	52.00°N 00.89°E	TL9938
Polstead Heath	Suffolk	52.02°N 00.89°E	TL9940
Poltalloch	Argyll and Bute	56.10°N 05.52°W	NR8196
Poltesco	Cornwall	49.99°N 05.18°W	SW7215
Poltimore	Devon	50.76°N 03.47°W	SX9697
Polton	Midlothian	55.86°N 03.13°W	NT2964
Polwarth	Scottish Borders	55.74°N 02.41°W	NT7450
Polwheveral	Cornwall	50.10°N 05.17°W	SW7328
Polyphant	Cornwall	50.61°N 04.46°W	SX2682
Polzeath	Cornwall	50.56°N 04.92°W	SW9378

== Pom-Pon ==
Location	Locality	Coordinates (links to map & photo sources)	OS grid reference
Pomeroy	Derbyshire	53.20°N 01.83°W	SK1167
Pomphlett	Devon	50.35°N 04.09°W	SX5153
Ponciau	Wrexham	53.00°N 03.05°W	SJ2946
Pond Close	Somerset	51.04°N 03.25°W	ST1228
Ponde	Powys	52.02°N 03.31°W	SO1037
Pondersbridge	Cambridgeshire	52.51°N 00.14°W	TL2692
Ponders End	Enfield	51.63°N 00.05°W	TQ3595
Pond Park	Buckinghamshire	51.70°N 00.62°W	SP9502
Pond Street	Essex	52.01°N 00.11°E	TL4537
Pondtail	Hampshire	51.27°N 00.82°W	SU8254
Pondwell	Isle of Wight	50.71°N 01.13°W	SZ6191
Poniou	Cornwall	50.18°N 05.58°W	SW4438
Ponjeravah	Cornwall	50.11°N 05.17°W	SW7329
Ponsanooth	Cornwall	50.19°N 05.15°W	SW7537
Ponsford	Devon	50.85°N 03.42°W	ST0007
Ponsonby	Cumbria	54.43°N 03.46°W	NY0505
Ponsongath	Cornwall	50.01°N 05.14°W	SW7517
Ponsworthy	Devon	50.54°N 03.83°W	SX7073
Pont	Cornwall	50.33°N 04.61°W	SX1452
Pontamman	Carmarthenshire	51.79°N 03.97°W	SN6412
Pontantwn	Carmarthenshire	51.79°N 04.26°W	SN4413
Pontardawe	Neath Port Talbot	51.72°N 03.85°W	SN7204
Pontarddulais	Swansea	51.70°N 04.04°W	SN5903
Pontarfynach	Ceredigion	52.36°N 03.86°W	SN7376
Pont-ar-gothi	Carmarthenshire	51.86°N 04.18°W	SN5021
Pont ar Hydfer	Powys	51.93°N 03.65°W	SN8627
Pont-ar-llechau	Carmarthenshire	51.90°N 03.86°W	SN7224
Pontarsais	Carmarthenshire	51.92°N 04.27°W	SN4428
Pontblyddyn	Flintshire	53.13°N 03.09°W	SJ2760
Pontbren Araeth	Carmarthenshire	51.88°N 03.96°W	SN6523
Pontcanna	Cardiff	51.48°N 03.21°W	ST1677
Pont Cysyllte	Wrexham	52.97°N 03.08°W	SJ2742
Pontdolgoch	Powys	52.52°N 03.47°W	SO0093
Pontefract	Wakefield	53.68°N 01.32°W	SE4521
Ponteland	Northumberland	55.05°N 01.75°W	NZ1673
Ponterwyd	Ceredigion	52.40°N 03.85°W	SN7480
Pontesbury	Shropshire	52.64°N 02.90°W	SJ3906
Pontesbury Hill	Shropshire	52.63°N 02.90°W	SJ3905
Pontesford	Shropshire	52.64°N 02.87°W	SJ4106
Pontfadog	Wrexham	52.93°N 03.14°W	SJ2338
Pontfaen	Pembrokeshire	51.96°N 04.88°W	SN0234
Pont-faen	Powys	51.99°N 03.47°W	SN9934
Pont-faen	Shropshire	52.91°N 03.08°W	SJ2736
Pontgarreg	Ceredigion	52.15°N 04.44°W	SN3354
Ponthen	Shropshire	52.74°N 02.99°W	SJ3317
Pont-Henri	Carmarthenshire	51.75°N 04.21°W	SN4709
Ponthir	City of Newport	51.62°N 02.98°W	ST3292
Ponthirwaun	Ceredigion	52.07°N 04.54°W	SN2645
Pont Hwfa	Isle of Anglesey	53.30°N 04.65°W	SH2382
Pontiago	Pembrokeshire	52.00°N 05.03°W	SM9238
Pontithel	Powys	52.01°N 03.22°W	SO1636
Pontllanfraith	Caerphilly	51.65°N 03.18°W	ST1896
Pontlliw	Swansea	51.69°N 04.01°W	SN6101
Pont Llogel	Powys	52.72°N 03.43°W	SJ0315
Pontllyfni	Gwynedd	53.04°N 04.34°W	SH4352
Pontlottyn	Caerphilly	51.74°N 03.29°W	SO1106
Pontneddfechan	Powys	51.75°N 03.59°W	SN9007
Pontnewydd	Torfaen	51.65°N 03.02°W	ST2996
Pontnewynydd	Torfaen	51.70°N 03.05°W	SO2701
Pont-newydd	Carmarthenshire	51.74°N 04.26°W	SN4407
Pont-newydd	Flintshire	53.17°N 03.22°W	SJ1865
Pontrhydfendigaid	Ceredigion	52.27°N 03.86°W	SN7366
Pont Rhydgaled	Powys	52.42°N 03.72°W	SN8382
Pont Rhyd-y-berry	Powys	52.01°N 03.50°W	SN9736
Pont Rhyd-y-cyff	Bridgend	51.58°N 03.63°W	SS8789
Pontrhydyfen	Neath Port Talbot	51.63°N 03.74°W	SS7994
Pont-rhyd-y-groes	Ceredigion	52.33°N 03.86°W	SN7372
Pontrhydyrun	Torfaen	51.66°N 03.02°W	ST2997
Pont-Rhythallt	Gwynedd	53.14°N 04.18°W	SH5463
Pontrilas	Herefordshire	51.93°N 02.88°W	SO3927
Pontrobert	Powys	52.69°N 03.33°W	SJ1012
Pont-rug	Gwynedd	53.14°N 04.22°W	SH5163
Ponts Green	East Sussex	50.91°N 00.37°E	TQ6715
Pontshill	Herefordshire	51.88°N 02.53°W	SO6321
Pont-siân	Ceredigion	52.09°N 04.29°W	SN4346
Pont Siôn Norton	Rhondda, Cynon, Taff	51.61°N 03.33°W	ST0891
Pontsticill	Merthyr Tydfil	51.78°N 03.37°W	SO0511
Pont-Walby	Neath Port Talbot	51.74°N 03.60°W	SN8906
Pontyates	Carmarthenshire	51.74°N 04.23°W	SN4608
Pontyberem	Carmarthenshire	51.77°N 04.17°W	SN5011
Pont-y-blew	Shropshire	52.93°N 03.02°W	SJ3138
Pontyclun	Rhondda, Cynon, Taff	51.51°N 03.39°W	ST0381
Pontycymer	Bridgend	51.60°N 03.59°W	SS9091
Pontyglasier	Pembrokeshire	51.99°N 04.71°W	SN1436
Pontygwaith	Rhondda, Cynon, Taff	51.63°N 03.44°W	ST0094
Pontymister	Caerphilly	51.60°N 03.09°W	ST2490
Pontymoel	Torfaen	51.69°N 03.02°W	SO2900
Pont-y-pant	Conwy	53.05°N 03.86°W	SH7553
Pontypool	Torfaen	51.69°N 03.04°W	SO2800
Pontypridd	Rhondda, Cynon, Taff	51.59°N 03.34°W	ST0789
Pont-yr-hafod	Pembrokeshire	51.89°N 05.05°W	SM9026
Pont-y-rhyl	Bridgend	51.58°N 03.58°W	SS9089
Pont-Ystrad	Denbighshire	53.16°N 03.42°W	SJ0564
Pont-y-wal	Powys	52.00°N 03.26°W	SO1335
Pontywaun	Caerphilly	51.62°N 03.12°W	ST2292

== Poo-Pop ==
Location	Locality	Coordinates (links to map & photo sources)	OS grid reference
Pooksgreen	Hampshire	50.88°N 01.47°W	SU3710
Pool	Cornwall	50.22°N 05.26°W	SW6741
Pool	Isles of Scilly	49.94°N 06.36°W	SV8714
Pool (Pool-in-Wharfedale)	Leeds	53.90°N 01.63°W	SE2445
Poolbrook	Worcestershire	52.09°N 02.30°W	SO7944
Pool Crofts	Highland	57.75°N 05.61°W	NG8580
Poole	Dorset	50.71°N 01.98°W	SZ0191
Poole	North Yorkshire	53.73°N 01.25°W	SE4927
Poole	Somerset	50.98°N 03.22°W	ST1421
Poole Keynes	Gloucestershire	51.65°N 02.00°W	SU0095
Poolend	Staffordshire	53.11°N 02.06°W	SJ9658
Poolestown	Dorset	50.94°N 02.38°W	ST7316
Poolewe	Highland	57.75°N 05.61°W	NG8580
Pooley Bridge	Cumbria	54.60°N 02.82°W	NY4724
Pooley Street	Norfolk	52.38°N 01.01°E	TM0581
Poolfold	Staffordshire	53.12°N 02.16°W	SJ8959
Pool Head	Herefordshire	52.14°N 02.65°W	SO5550
Poolhead	Shropshire	52.88°N 02.75°W	SJ4932
Pool Hey	Lancashire	53.62°N 02.96°W	SD3615
Poolhill	Gloucestershire	51.95°N 02.39°W	SO7329
Poolmill	Herefordshire	51.91°N 02.61°W	SO5824
Pool of Muckhart	Clackmannan	56.18°N 03.61°W	NO0000
Pool Quay	Powys	52.69°N 03.11°W	SJ2511
Poolsbrook	Derbyshire	53.25°N 01.34°W	SK4473
Poolstock	Wigan	53.53°N 02.65°W	SD5704
Pooltown	Somerset	51.12°N 03.45°W	SS9837
Pootings	Kent	51.22°N 00.07°E	TQ4549
Pope Hill	Pembrokeshire	51.76°N 05.00°W	SM9312
Pope's Hill	Gloucestershire	51.82°N 02.46°W	SO6814
Popeswood	Berkshire	51.41°N 00.79°W	SU8469
Popham	Devon	51.07°N 03.85°W	SS7032
Popham	Hampshire	51.18°N 01.21°W	SU5543
Poplar	Tower Hamlets	51.50°N 00.02°W	TQ3780
Poplar Grove	Lincolnshire	53.45°N 00.13°E	TF4297
Poplars	Hertfordshire	51.89°N 00.17°W	TL2623
Popley	Hampshire	51.28°N 01.08°W	SU6454

== Por ==
Location	Locality	Coordinates (links to map & photo sources)	OS grid reference
Porchester	Nottinghamshire	52.97°N 01.12°W	SK5942
Porchfield	Isle of Wight	50.71°N 01.37°W	SZ4491
Poringland	Norfolk	52.56°N 01.33°E	TG2602
Porkellis	Cornwall	50.15°N 05.23°W	SW6933
Porlock	Somerset	51.20°N 03.60°W	SS8846
Porlockford	Somerset	51.21°N 03.63°W	SS8647
Porlock Weir	Somerset	51.21°N 03.63°W	SS8647
Port an-eorna / Portneora	Highland	57.31°N 05.70°W	NG7731
Port Ann	Argyll and Bute	56.02°N 05.37°W	NR9086
Port Appin	Argyll and Bute	56.55°N 05.41°W	NM9045
Portash	Wiltshire	51.07°N 02.05°W	ST9631
Port Askaig	Argyll and Bute	55.84°N 06.10°W	NR4369
Portavadie	Argyll and Bute	55.87°N 05.31°W	NR9369
Port Bannatyne	Argyll and Bute	55.85°N 05.06°W	NS0867
Port Brae	Fife	56.10°N 03.15°W	NT2891
Port Bridge	Devon	50.40°N 03.61°W	SX8557
Portbury	North Somerset	51.47°N 02.73°W	ST4975
Port Carlisle	Cumbria	54.94°N 03.18°W	NY2462
Port Charlotte	Argyll and Bute	55.73°N 06.38°W	NR2558
Portchester	Hampshire	50.84°N 01.13°W	SU6105
Port Clarence	Middlesbrough	54.58°N 01.24°W	NZ4921
Port Dinorwic	Gwynedd	53.17°N 04.21°W	SH5267
Port Dundas	City of Glasgow	55.86°N 04.25°W	NS5966
Porteath	Cornwall	50.57°N 04.88°W	SW9679
Port Edgar	City of Edinburgh	55.98°N 03.42°W	NT1178
Port Ellen	Argyll and Bute	55.62°N 06.19°W	NR3645
Port Elphinstone	Aberdeenshire	57.27°N 02.38°W	NJ7720
Portencross	North Ayrshire	55.69°N 04.91°W	NS1748
Porterfield	Renfrewshire	55.86°N 04.41°W	NS4966
Port Erin	Isle of Man	54.08°N 04.76°W	SC1969
Port Erroll	Aberdeenshire	57.41°N 01.85°W	NK0936
Porter's End	Hertfordshire	51.83°N 00.31°W	TL1617
Portesham	Dorset	50.66°N 02.56°W	SY6085
Portessie	Moray	57.68°N 02.94°W	NJ4466
Port e Vullen	Isle of Man	54.30°N 04.35°W	SC4792
Port Eynon	Swansea	51.54°N 04.22°W	SS4685
Port Eynon Point	Swansea	51.53°N 04.21°W	SS468845
Portfield	Somerset	51.03°N 02.85°W	ST4026
Portfield	West Sussex	50.83°N 00.76°W	SU8705
Portfield Gate	Pembrokeshire	51.79°N 05.01°W	SM9215
Port Gaverne	Cornwall	50.58°N 04.82°W	SX0080
Port Glasgow	Inverclyde	55.93°N 04.69°W	NS3274
Portgordon	Moray	57.66°N 03.02°W	NJ3964
Portgower	Highland	58.09°N 03.69°W	ND0013
Porth	Cornwall	50.41°N 05.05°W	SW8362
Porth	Rhondda, Cynon, Taff	51.60°N 03.41°W	ST0291
Porthaethwy	Isle of Anglesey	53.22°N 04.17°W	SH5572
Porthallow (Polperro)	Cornwall	50.33°N 04.50°W	SX2251
Porthallow (St Keverne)	Cornwall	50.06°N 05.08°W	SW7923
Porthcawl	Bridgend	51.47°N 03.70°W	SS8277
Porth Colmon	Gwynedd	52.87°N 04.69°W	SH1934
Porthcothan	Cornwall	50.50°N 05.03°W	SW8572
Porthcurno	Cornwall	50.04°N 05.66°W	SW3822
Portheiddy	Pembrokeshire	51.93°N 05.20°W	SM8031
Port Henderson	Highland	57.69°N 05.77°W	NG7573
Porthgain	Pembrokeshire	51.94°N 05.18°W	SM8132
Porthgwarra	Cornwall	50.03°N 05.67°W	SW3721
Port Hill	Oxfordshire	51.57°N 01.01°W	SU6887
Porthill	Shropshire	52.70°N 02.78°W	SJ4712
Porthill	Staffordshire	53.02°N 02.22°W	SJ8548
Porthilly	Cornwall	50.53°N 04.92°W	SW9375
Porth Kea	Cornwall	50.23°N 05.05°W	SW8242
Porthkerry	The Vale Of Glamorgan	51.38°N 03.32°W	ST0866
Porthleven	Cornwall	50.07°N 05.32°W	SW6225
Porthllechog	Isle of Anglesey	53.41°N 04.37°W	SH4294
Porthloo	Isles of Scilly	49.91°N 06.32°W	SV9011
Porthmadog	Gwynedd	52.92°N 04.14°W	SH5638
Porthmeor	Cornwall	50.17°N 05.60°W	SW4337
Porth Navas	Cornwall	50.10°N 05.14°W	SW7527
Portholland	Cornwall	50.23°N 04.87°W	SW9541
Porthoustock	Cornwall	50.04°N 05.07°W	SW8021
Porthtowan	Cornwall	50.27°N 05.24°W	SW6947
Porth Tywyn	Carmarthenshire	51.68°N 04.25°W	SN4401
Porth-y-Felin	Isle of Anglesey	53.31°N 04.64°W	SH2483
Porthyrhyd (Cilycwm)	Carmarthenshire	52.01°N 03.88°W	SN7137
Porthyrhyd (Llanddarog)	Carmarthenshire	51.81°N 04.16°W	SN5115
Porth-y-waen	Shropshire	52.79°N 03.09°W	SJ2623
Portico	St Helens	53.43°N 02.78°W	SJ4893
Portincaple	Argyll and Bute	56.09°N 04.84°W	NS2393
Portington	Devon	50.56°N 04.23°W	SX4276
Portington	East Riding of Yorkshire	53.77°N 00.81°W	SE7830
Portinnisherrich	Argyll and Bute	56.24°N 05.27°W	NM9711
Portinscale	Cumbria	54.59°N 03.16°W	NY2523
Port Isaac	Cornwall	50.58°N 04.84°W	SW9980
Portishead	North Somerset	51.48°N 02.77°W	ST4676
Portkil	Argyll and Bute	55.98°N 04.80°W	NS2580
Portknockie	Moray	57.69°N 02.87°W	NJ4868
Portland	Somerset	51.12°N 02.75°W	ST4736
Portlethen	Aberdeenshire	57.05°N 02.11°W	NO9396
Portlethen Village	Aberdeenshire	57.05°N 02.11°W	NO9396
Port Lion	Pembrokeshire	51.73°N 04.92°W	SM9808
Portloe	Cornwall	50.21°N 04.90°W	SW9339
Port Logan	Dumfries and Galloway	54.71°N 04.96°W	NX0940
Portlooe	Cornwall	50.34°N 04.47°W	SX2452
Portmahomack	Highland	57.83°N 03.83°W	NH9184
Port Mead	Swansea	51.64°N 03.98°W	SS6396
Portmeirion	Gwynedd	52.91°N 04.11°W	SH5837
Portmellon	Cornwall	50.25°N 04.79°W	SX0143
Port Mholair	Western Isles	58.24°N 06.16°W	NB5636
Port Mòr	Highland	56.83°N 06.23°W	NM4279
Portmore	Hampshire	50.77°N 01.53°W	SZ3397
Port Mulgrave	North Yorkshire	54.54°N 00.78°W	NZ7917
Portnacroish	Argyll and Bute	56.56°N 05.38°W	NM9247
Portnahaven	Argyll and Bute	55.67°N 06.51°W	NR1652
Portnalong	Highland	57.31°N 06.42°W	NG3434
Portnaluchaig	Highland	56.93°N 05.86°W	NM6589
Port nan Giùran / Portnaguran	Western Isles	58.25°N 06.17°W	NB5537
Port Nis	Western Isles	58.48°N 06.24°W	NB5363
Portobello	City of Edinburgh	55.94°N 03.12°W	NT3073
Portobello	Gateshead	54.88°N 01.56°W	NZ2855
Portobello	Wakefield	53.65°N 01.50°W	SE3318
Portobello	Wolverhampton	52.58°N 02.07°W	SO9598
Port of Menteith	Stirling	56.18°N 04.28°W	NN5801
Porton	Wiltshire	51.12°N 01.72°W	SU1936
Portormin	Highland	58.24°N 03.43°W	ND1629
Portpatrick	Dumfries and Galloway	54.84°N 05.13°W	NW9954
Port Quin	Cornwall	50.58°N 04.86°W	SW9780
Portrack	Stockton-on-Tees	54.56°N 01.29°W	NZ4619
Port Ramsay	Argyll and Bute	56.54°N 05.45°W	NM8845
Portreath	Cornwall	50.25°N 05.29°W	SW6545
Portree	Highland	57.40°N 06.19°W	NG4843
Portscatho	Cornwall	50.17°N 04.98°W	SW8735
Portsea	City of Portsmouth	50.79°N 01.10°W	SU6300
Portsea Island	City of Portsmouth	50.80°N 01.07°W	SU6501
Portskerra	Highland	58.55°N 03.94°W	NC8765
Portskewett	Monmouthshire	51.58°N 02.73°W	ST4988
Portslade-By-Sea	West Sussex	50.83°N 00.22°W	TQ2505
Portslade Village	West Sussex	50.84°N 00.22°W	TQ2506
Portslogan	Dumfries and Galloway	54.87°N 05.15°W	NW9858
Portsmouth	Calderdale	53.73°N 02.16°W	SD8926
Portsmouth	City of Portsmouth	50.80°N 01.07°W	SU6501
Portsonachan	Argyll and Bute	56.33°N 05.15°W	NN0520
Portsoy	Aberdeenshire	57.68°N 02.70°W	NJ5866
Port St Mary	Isle of Man	54.06°N 04.75°W	SC2067
Port Sunlight	Wirral	53.34°N 03.00°W	SJ3384
Port Sutton Bridge	Lincolnshire	52.77°N 00.19°E	TF4822
Portswood	City of Southampton	50.92°N 01.38°W	SU4314
Port Talbot	Neath Port Talbot	51.58°N 03.80°W	SS7589
Porttannachy	Moray	57.66°N 03.04°W	NJ3864
Port Tennant	Swansea	51.62°N 03.90°W	SS6893
Portuairk	Highland	56.73°N 06.20°W	NM4368
Portvasgo	Highland	58.54°N 04.44°W	NC5864
Portway	Dorset	50.66°N 02.28°W	SY8085
Portway	Gloucestershire	51.99°N 02.33°W	SO7733
Portway	North of Hereford, Herefordshire	52.10°N 02.76°W	SO4845
Portway	Sandwell	52.49°N 02.04°W	SO9788
Portway (Langport)	Somerset	51.03°N 02.84°W	ST4126
Portway (Street)	Somerset	51.12°N 02.74°W	ST4836
Portway	Herefordshire	52.01°N 02.74°W	SO4935
Portway	Warwickshire	52.34°N 01.88°W	SP0872
Port Wemyss	Argyll and Bute	55.66°N 06.51°W	NR1651
Port William	Dumfries and Galloway	54.75°N 04.59°W	NX3343
Portwood	Stockport	53.40°N 02.15°W	SJ9090
Portwrinkle	Cornwall	50.35°N 04.32°W	SX3553
Posenhall	Shropshire	52.60°N 02.51°W	SJ6501

== Pos-Poz ==
Location	Locality	Coordinates (links to map & photo sources)	OS grid reference
Poslingford	Suffolk	52.10°N 00.56°E	TL7648
Possil Park	City of Glasgow	55.88°N 04.27°W	NS5868
Posso	Scottish Borders	55.58°N 03.27°W	NT2033
Postbridge	Devon	50.59°N 03.90°W	SX6579
Postcombe	Oxfordshire	51.68°N 00.98°W	SU7099
Post Green	Dorset	50.73°N 02.07°W	SY9593
Postling	Kent	51.10°N 01.05°E	TR1438
Postlip	Gloucestershire	51.94°N 02.00°W	SP0027
Postwick	Norfolk	52.61°N 01.38°E	TG2907
Potash	Suffolk	51.99°N 01.07°E	TM1137
Potbridge	Hampshire	51.27°N 00.94°W	SU7453
Pot Common	Surrey	51.17°N 00.71°W	SU9042
Pot Common	West Sussex	51.13°N 00.12°W	TQ3139
Potman's Heath	Kent	51.02°N 00.66°E	TQ8728
Potsgrove	Bedfordshire	51.95°N 00.61°W	SP9529
Potten End	Hertfordshire	51.76°N 00.53°W	TL0108
Potten Street	Kent	51.35°N 01.23°E	TR2567
Potter Brompton	North Yorkshire	54.18°N 00.51°W	SE9777
Pottergate Street	Norfolk	52.47°N 01.16°E	TM1591
Potterhanworth	Lincolnshire	53.18°N 00.43°W	TF0566
Potterhanworth Booths	Lincolnshire	53.18°N 00.39°W	TF0767
Potter Heigham	Norfolk	52.71°N 01.56°E	TG4119
Potter Hill	Leicestershire	52.78°N 00.91°W	SK7321
Potter Hill	Sheffield	53.46°N 01.50°W	SK3397
Potterne	Wiltshire	51.32°N 02.01°W	ST9958
Potterne Wick	Wiltshire	51.31°N 02.00°W	SU0057
Potternewton	Leeds	53.81°N 01.54°W	SE3036
Potters Bar	Hertfordshire	51.69°N 00.19°W	TL2501
Potters Brook	Lancashire	53.96°N 02.79°W	SD4852
Potters Corner	Kent	51.16°N 00.84°E	TQ9944
Potters Crouch	Hertfordshire	51.73°N 00.39°W	TL1105
Potter's Forstal	Kent	51.18°N 00.68°E	TQ8846
Potter's Green	East Sussex	50.98°N 00.13°E	TQ5023
Potter's Green	Coventry	52.43°N 01.45°W	SP3782
Pottersheath	Hertfordshire	51.84°N 00.21°W	TL2318
Potters Hill	North Somerset	51.39°N 02.70°W	ST5166
Potters Marston	Leicestershire	52.55°N 01.27°W	SP4996
Potter Somersal	Derbyshire	52.92°N 01.79°W	SK1436
Potterspury	Northamptonshire	52.08°N 00.90°W	SP7543
Potter Street	Essex	51.75°N 00.12°E	TL4708
Potterton	Aberdeenshire	57.22°N 02.10°W	NJ9415
Potterton	Leeds	53.83°N 01.39°W	SE4038
Pottery Field	Leeds	53.78°N 01.54°W	SE3032
Potthorpe	Norfolk	52.76°N 00.87°E	TF9422
Pottington	Devon	51.07°N 04.07°W	SS5533
Potto	North Yorkshire	54.42°N 01.27°W	NZ4703
Potton	Bedfordshire	52.12°N 00.21°W	TL2249
Potton Island	Essex	51.58°N 00.82°E	TQ956909
Pott Row	Norfolk	52.76°N 00.51°E	TF7021
Pott Shrigley	Cheshire	53.30°N 02.09°W	SJ9479
Pouchen End	Hertfordshire	51.74°N 00.52°W	TL0206
Poughill	Cornwall	50.83°N 04.52°W	SS2207
Poughill	Devon	50.86°N 03.63°W	SS8508
Poulner	Hampshire	50.84°N 01.77°W	SU1605
Poulshot	Wiltshire	51.33°N 02.05°W	ST9659
Poulton	Cheshire	53.11°N 02.91°W	SJ3958
Poulton	Gloucestershire	51.70°N 01.85°W	SP1001
Poulton (Wallasey)	Wirral	53.40°N 03.05°W	SJ3090
Poulton or Poulton Lancelyn (Bebington)	Wirral	53.33°N 03.00°W	SJ3382
Poulton-le-Fylde	Lancashire	53.84°N 03.00°W	SD3439
Pound	Somerset	50.93°N 02.79°W	ST4415
Pound Bank	Great Malvern, Worcestershire	52.10°N 02.30°W	SO7945
Pound Bank	Worcestershire	52.35°N 02.39°W	SO7373
Poundffald	Swansea	51.62°N 04.08°W	SS5694
Poundfield	East Sussex	51.04°N 00.18°E	TQ5330
Poundford	East Sussex	50.99°N 00.20°E	TQ5524
Poundgate	East Sussex	51.03°N 00.12°E	TQ4928
Poundgreen	Berkshire	51.39°N 01.00°W	SU6967
Pound Green	East Sussex	50.98°N 00.13°E	TQ5023
Pound Green	Hampshire	51.32°N 01.18°W	SU5759
Pound Green	Isle of Wight	50.67°N 01.53°W	SZ3386
Pound Green	Worcestershire	52.39°N 02.36°W	SO7578
Pound Green	Suffolk	52.14°N 00.49°E	TL7153
Pound Hill	West Sussex	51.11°N 00.15°W	TQ2937
Poundland	South Ayrshire	55.14°N 04.87°W	NX1787
Poundon	Buckinghamshire	51.92°N 01.07°W	SP6425
Poundsbridge	Kent	51.14°N 00.18°E	TQ5341
Poundsgate	Devon	50.53°N 03.83°W	SX7072
Poundstock	Cornwall	50.76°N 04.55°W	SX2099
Pound Street	Hampshire	51.34°N 01.35°W	SU4561
Pounsley	East Sussex	50.96°N 00.16°E	TQ5221
Poverest	Bromley	51.39°N 00.09°E	TQ4668
Povey Cross	Surrey	51.16°N 00.19°W	TQ2642
Powburn	Northumberland	55.43°N 01.90°W	NU0616
Powderham	Devon	50.64°N 03.47°W	SX9684
Powder Mills	Kent	51.20°N 00.23°E	TQ5647
Powers Hall End	Essex	51.80°N 00.60°E	TL8015
Powerstock	Dorset	50.76°N 02.69°W	SY5196
Powfoot	Dumfries and Galloway	54.97°N 03.34°W	NY1465
Pow Green	Herefordshire	52.09°N 02.42°W	SO7144
Powhill	Cumbria	54.88°N 03.20°W	NY2355
Powick	Worcestershire	52.15°N 02.24°W	SO8351
Powler's Piece	Devon	50.93°N 04.32°W	SS3718
Powmill	Perth and Kinross	56.16°N 03.57°W	NT0298
Pownall Park	Cheshire	53.32°N 02.25°W	SJ8381
Powntley Copse	Hampshire	51.19°N 00.99°W	SU7044
Poyle	Berkshire	51.47°N 00.51°W	TQ0376
Poynings	West Sussex	50.89°N 00.20°W	TQ2612
Poyntington	Dorset	50.97°N 02.49°W	ST6520
Poynton	Cheshire	53.34°N 02.12°W	SJ9283
Poynton	Shropshire	52.74°N 02.63°W	SJ5717
Poynton Green	Shropshire	52.75°N 02.65°W	SJ5618
Poyston	Pembrokeshire	51.83°N 04.96°W	SM9619
Poyston Cross	Pembrokeshire	51.83°N 04.94°W	SM9719
Poystreet Green	Suffolk	52.18°N 00.89°E	TL9858
