= Portfield =

Portfield may refer to:

== England ==
- Portfield, Dorset, a suburb of Christchurch, Dorset
- Portfield, Somerset, a location
- Portfield, West Sussex, a location
  - Portfield F.C., a defunct football club based in Chichester, West Sussex
- Portfield Hillfort, a building in Lancashire

== See also ==
- Porterfield (disambiguation)
