= John Hellins (entomologist) =

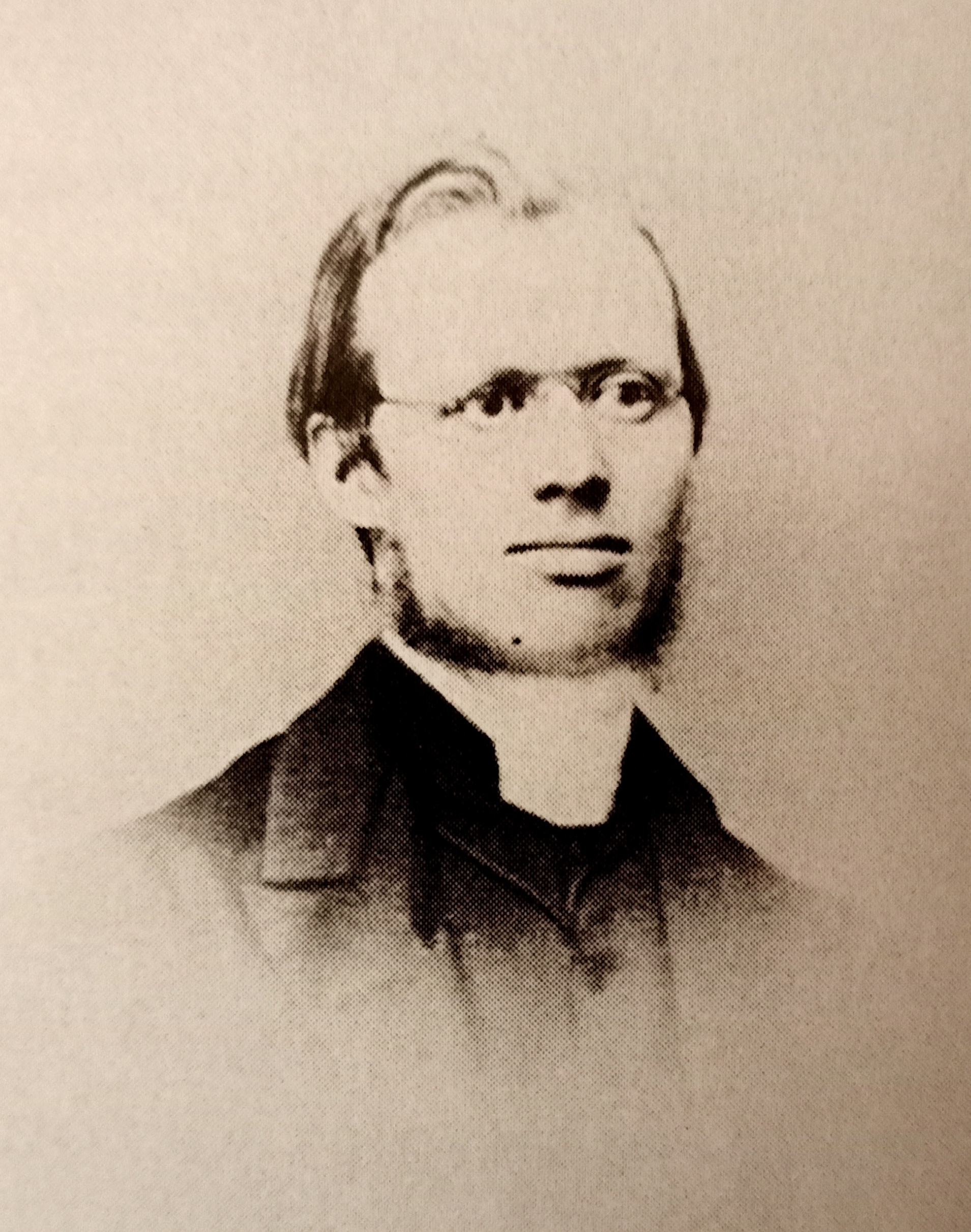

John Hellins (15 May 1829 – 9 May 1887) was a prison chaplain, school teacher, and entomologist well known in the nineteenth and early twentieth centuries for his seminal work on the early stages (eggs, larvae and pupae) of the butterflies and moths of Great Britain. He was the grandson of John Hellins (c. 1749–1827) the astronomer.

== Life and works ==
Hellins was born in Bow, Devon, the son of William Brock Hellins, a prison chaplain, and his wife, Elizabeth. He attended the University of Oxford as a bible scholar at All Souls College (B.A. 1851, then routinely upgraded to M.A.), becoming an ordained Church of England deacon (1852) and priest (1854); he was a Second Master at Exeter Grammar School, before becoming (Anglican) Chaplain to the Devon County Prison in Exeter in 1859, replacing his recently deceased father in the post. He married Eleanor Gard in 1857; they had two daughters and a son. His dedication, particularly to the rehabilitation of discharged prisoners, was well recognised. After around twelve years his health declined, including a near loss of his sight, and in 1879 the Church allowed him to retire (with one good eye) to a sinecure as a "clergyman without care of souls" with lodgings in the precinct of Exeter Cathedral, where his wife ran a day school, assisted by their two daughters and quite possibly by him. He died in Exeter.

== Entomological work ==
In the days before light traps, moth-collectors obtained most of their specimens by finding and then raising caterpillars, or breeding them up from eggs. During an egg-exchange in 1858 while he was still teaching, Hellins struck up a correspondence with William Buckler (1814–1884), a graphic and portrait artist who, steadily losing his employment to photography, had started a project to depict the hitherto largely unknown caterpillars of the British moths and butterflies. The two then collaborated until Buckler's death in 1884, Hellins sending caterpillars to Buckler for painting, and both men making detailed descriptions of the various species. Buckler in return sent Hellins copies of his paintings. There was not infrequently a daily exchange of packets and letters through the mail. Many of these descriptions were published, under their two separate names, in the Entomologist's Monthly Magazine. Over the years they then built up such a large portfolio of descriptions and paintings, that they agreed to collaborate on a fully illustrated book on British caterpillars (along with eggs and pupae). By 1873 they had covered 850 species, and Buckler had amassed over 5000 drawings and paintings.

After Buckler died, H. T. Stainton took over the editorship of the projected book, which commenced publication in 1886 as The Larvae of the British Butterflies and Moths, eventually completed in 1901 in nine volumes, under the editorship of first Stainton and then George Taylor Porritt. This included descriptions by Hellins, constituting up to a third of the work, and by modern standards he would have been featured as a co-author (particularly in the earlier volumes). Perhaps a natural and priestly modesty moved him to decline co-authorship, or perhaps an overwhelming urge to give of himself in memory of his recently deceased friend, whom he was not long to survive. As it is, although in the text the editor has carefully noted the authorship of the individual descriptions, the work is normally cited as being solely by Buckler, and Hellins’ fame somewhat declined over the years. It is notable however that he was, with Buckler, the joint dedicatee of a popular book on Lepidoptera by Stainton, and that his descriptions of caterpillars continued to be attributed to him up to the middle of the twentieth century.

Hellins exchanged letters with Charles Darwin on the question of the sex ratio in moths; and kept a continuous entomological diary from 1857 to his death in 1887 (whereabouts currently unknown).

== Legacy ==
The African plume moth genus Hellinsia was named in his honour by J.W. Tutt in 1905.

== Publications ==
Numerous descriptions of individual species in W Buckler (edited by H.T. Stainton) The larvae of the British butterflies and moths. Volumes 1–5. London, Ray Society (1886–1893). See The larvæ of the British butterflies and moths

Further descriptions of individual species in W Buckler (edited by G.T. Porritt) The larvae of the British butterflies and moths. Volumes 6–9 London, Ray Society (1895–1901). See The larvæ of the British butterflies and moths

Hellins’ (and Buckler's) individual descriptions of larvae in the Entomologist's Monthly Magazine volumes 1–18 and elsewhere, are listed in

Hellins published papers on other groups of insects (e.g. Coleoptera, Hemiptera), which have not been fully listed, in the Entomologist's Monthly Magazine during the 1860s and 1870s that continue to be cited in the second millennium (https://scholar.google.co.uk)
