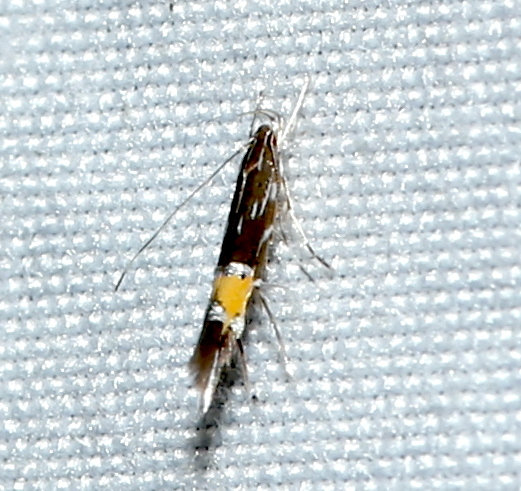

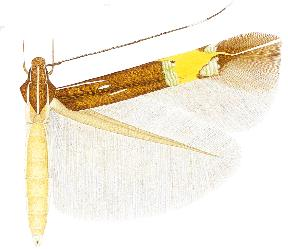

Scientific classification
- Kingdom: Animalia
- Phylum: Arthropoda
- Clade: Pancrustacea
- Class: Insecta
- Order: Lepidoptera
- Family: Cosmopterigidae
- Genus: Cosmopterix
- Species: C. clemensella

Binomial name
- Cosmopterix clemensella Stainton, 1860

Synonyms
- Cosmopterix hermodora Meyrick, 1919

= Cosmopterix clemensella =

Clemens' cosmopterix moth

Species of moth

Cosmopterix clemensella (Clemens' cosmopterix moth) is a moth of the family Cosmopterigidae. It is known from Canada (Manitoba, Ontario) and the United States (from Maine to the mountains of southern North Carolina, but most commonly in New York and Ohio).

== Description ==
Male, female. Forewing length 4.9 mm. Head: frons shining pale silvery grey with greenish and reddish reflections; vertex and neck tufts shining dark greyish brown with reddish gloss, laterally and medially lined white, collar shining dark greyish brown with reddish gloss; labial palpus first segment very short, ochreous-white, second segment three-quarters of the length of third, greyish brown with white longitudinal lines laterally and ventrally, third segment white, laterally with brown lines; scape dorsally dark greyish brown with a white anterior line, ventrally white, antenna shining dark brown with an interrupted white line from base to beyond one-half, a short section at base often uninterrupted, followed towards apex by approximately ten dark brown segments, nine white, ten dark brown and seven white segments at apex. Thorax and tegulae shining dark greyish brown with reddish gloss, thorax with a white medial line and tegulae lined white inwardly. Legs: shining dark brown with reddish gloss, femora of midleg and hindleg shining pale ochreous-grey, foreleg with a white line on tibia and tarsal segments one to three and five, tibiae of midleg and hindleg with white oblique basal and medial lines and white apical rings, midleg with tarsal segment one to three with white apical rings, segment five entirely white, hindleg with tarsal segments dorsally white and ochreous apical rings, segment five entirely white, spurs dark brown ventrally, dorsally white. Forewing shining dark greyish brown with reddish gloss, three silvery white lines in the basal area, a subcostal from base to one-quarter, slightly bending from costa distally, a very short but thick medial above fold, ending at the distal end of the subcostal, a subdorsal, twice as long as the medial but narrower, starting just before the distal end of the medial, a yellow transverse fascia beyond the middle, narrowed towards dorsum and with a narrow and dorsally bent apical protrusion, bordered at the inner edge by a tubercular silver metallic fascia with greenish reflection, not reaching costa and with a blackish spot subcostally on outside, bordered at the outer edge by two tubercular silver metallic costal and dorsal spots with greenish reflection, the dorsal spot about four times as large as the costal and more towards base, both silver metallic spots irregularly lined dark greyish brown on the inside, a short white costal streak from the costal spot, a shining white apical line from the apical protrusion to apex, cilia dark greyish brown, paler towards dorsum. Hindwing shining pale brownish grey, cilia greyish brown. Underside: forewing shining greyish brown, hindwing shining greyish brown. Abdomen dorsally yellow-ochreous, laterally shining pale grey with greenish reflection, ventrally shining white, anal tuft yellowish white.

== Biology ==
The larvae feed on Carex species. They mine the leaves of their host plant. The adult flies from mid-May to early August.

=== References ===
As of this edit, this article uses content from "The genera Cosmopterix Hübner and Pebobs Hodges in the New World with special attention to the Neotropical fauna (Lepidoptera: Cosmopterigidae)", which is licensed in a way that permits reuse under the Creative Commons Attribution-ShareAlike 3.0 Unported License, but not under the GFDL. All relevant terms must be followed.
