= Trenarth Bridge =

Bridge in Cornwall, England

Coordinates: 50.113°N 5.138°W

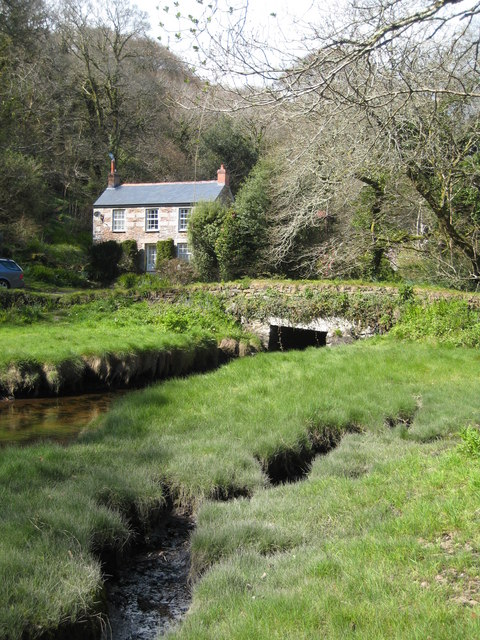
Trenarth Bridge

Trenarth Bridge (Cornish: Pons Tre Nerth, meaning bridge of Nerth's farm) is at the head of the centre head of Port Navas Creek in Cornwall, England and is between Mawnan Smith and Porth Navas. The bridge dates back to the 18th or early 19th centuries and is grade II listed.
