= Portington =

Portington may refer to:

== Places ==
- Portington, Devon, England
- Portington, East Riding of Yorkshire, England

== People ==
- William Portington (1544-1628), English carpenter
