= Pond Street =

Pond Street may refer to:

- Pond Street, Essex, a location in Essex, England
- Pond Street, Hampstead, a street in London, England

== See also ==
- Pont Street
