= Porterfield (surname) =

Porterfield is a surname of Scottish origin. It was first used by descendants of John de Porter in 1262. Notable people with the surname include:

- Alfred Porterfield (1869 – after 1894), Scottish football goalkeeper
- Bob Porterfield (1923–80), American Major League Baseball pitcher
- Christopher Porterfield (born before 2006), American songwriter, guitarist and singer
- Daniel R. Porterfield (born 1961), American academic administrator, 15th president of Franklin & Marshall College
- Eric Porterfield (born 1974), American politician in West Virginia
- Eugene Porterfield (born 1946), American politician in Pennsylvania
- Garry Porterfield (born 1943), former American football player for the Dallas Cowboys
- George A. Porterfield (1822–1919), American and Confederate army officer
- Gordon Porterfield (born before 1968), American playwright, novelist, poet and teacher
- Harry Porterfield (1928–2023), American news anchor
- Ian Porterfield (1946–2007), Scottish football player and coach
- John Porterfield (fl. 1571), Scottish prelate
- Katherine Porterfield (born before 1998), American child psychologist
- Leslie Porterfield (born 1976), American female motorcyclist who has set several speed records
- Lewis B. Porterfield (1879–1942), American admiral
- Matthew Porterfield (born 1977), American independent filmmaker
- Robert Porterfield 1751–1843), Virginia planter, politician, magistrate, and military officer
- Robert Porterfield (1905–71), American founder of the Barter Theatre
- Ron Porterfield (born before 1983), American Major League Baseball athletic trainer
- Shaletta Porterfield (born 1985), American beauty queen
- William Porterfield (born 1984), Irish cricketer

== See also ==
- Porterfield (disambiguation)
