= Listed buildings in Eastrington =

Eastrington is a civil parish in the county of the East Riding of Yorkshire, England. It contains eight listed buildings that are recorded in the National Heritage List for England. Of these, one is listed at Grade I, the highest of the three grades, and the others are at Grade II, the lowest grade. The parish contains the village of Eastrington, the hamlet of Portington, and the surrounding countryside. The listed buildings consist of a church, houses, and a barn.

== Key ==
Grade	Criteria
I	Buildings of exceptional interest, sometimes considered to be internationally important
II	Buildings of national importance and special interest

== Buildings ==
Name and location	Photograph	Date	Notes	Grade
St Michael's Church; 53.76011°N 0.79334°W		11th or 12th century	The church has been altered and extended through the centuries. It is built in limestone with a lead roof, and consists of a nave and a chancel, both with clerestories, the chancel with chapels, north and south full-length aisles, and a west tower embraced by the aisles. The tower has four stages, diagonal buttresses, a chamfered plinth, a pointed west window with a hood mould, and a three-light Perpendicular window with a hood mould and coats of arms above. Over this is a window with a four-centred arch, two-light bell openings, gargoyles, and an embattled parapet with corner crocketed pinnacles. There are also embattled parapets and crocketed pinnacles along the body of the church. In the porch is a Norman frieze depicting animals.	I
Portington Hall; 53.76941°N 0.80474°W		c. 1670	The house is in brick on a plinth, with stone dressings, quoins, and hipped pantile roofs. There are two storeys and an E-shaped plan, with a main range of five bays, the middle and outer bays projecting, and a later single-bay extension on the left. The middle bay forms a porch with a doorway, and the ground floor windows are casements. The window above the doorway is fixed, and the other upper floor windows are sashes; all the windows on the main range have quoined surrounds. On the extension are sashes, and the outer bays of the main range have gabled dormers.	II
The Manor House; 53.75955°N 0.79328°W	—	1714	The house, which has been altered and divided into two, is in brick, with paired gutter brackets, and a hipped pantile roof. There are two storeys and four bays, and each part has a rear wing. In each centre bay is a round-arched doorway with pilasters and a semicircular fanlight, and above the right doorway is a datestone. The windows are sashes with flat brick arches.	II
Newland Gate; 53.74779°N 0.78145°W		Mid-18th century	The house is in whitewashed brick with a pantile roof. There are two storeys and three bays, and a rear wing. The central doorway has a divided fanlight, and the windows are sashes, those on the ground floor under segmental arches; the sash windows on the upper floor are horizontally sliding.	II
Barn, Newland Gate; 53.74775°N 0.78169°W	—	Mid-18th century	The barn is in brick with a pantile roof. There are two storeys and three bays. It contains a stable door with a pitching door above, and two rows of rectangular vents.	II
The Old Vicarage; 53.76025°N 0.79475°W	—	Mid-18th century	The vicarage, later a private house, has been extended. It is in colourwashed brick with a roof of pantile and Welsh slate. There is a main block with two storeys and three bays, a single-storey two-bay wing on the left, and a higher two-storey two-bay wing recessed on the right. The middle bay of the main block projects slightly, and has a full-height round-arched recess containing a doorway with pilasters and a radial fanlight. The windows are sashes with wedge lintels.	II
Moss Farmhouse; 53.75909°N 0.79626°W	—	Late 18th century	The house is in variegated red and yellow brick, with a timber cornice, and a pantile roof with gable coping and shaped kneelers. There are two storeys, three bays, and a rear cross-wing. The central doorway has a rectangular fanlight, the windows are sashes, and all the openings have flat brick arches with keystones.	II
The Laurels; 53.75860°N 0.79117°W	—	Late 18th century	The house is in brown brick, with decorative red brick on the angles, a floor band, and a pantile roof with raised gable ends. There are two storeys and three bays, and a projecting single-bay extension on the left. The middle bay projects slightly, and contains a doorway with a blocked fanlight. The windows are sashes, and all the openings have flat brick arches and keystones. On the right return of the extension is a casement window.	II
