= William Buckler =

English painter and entomologist

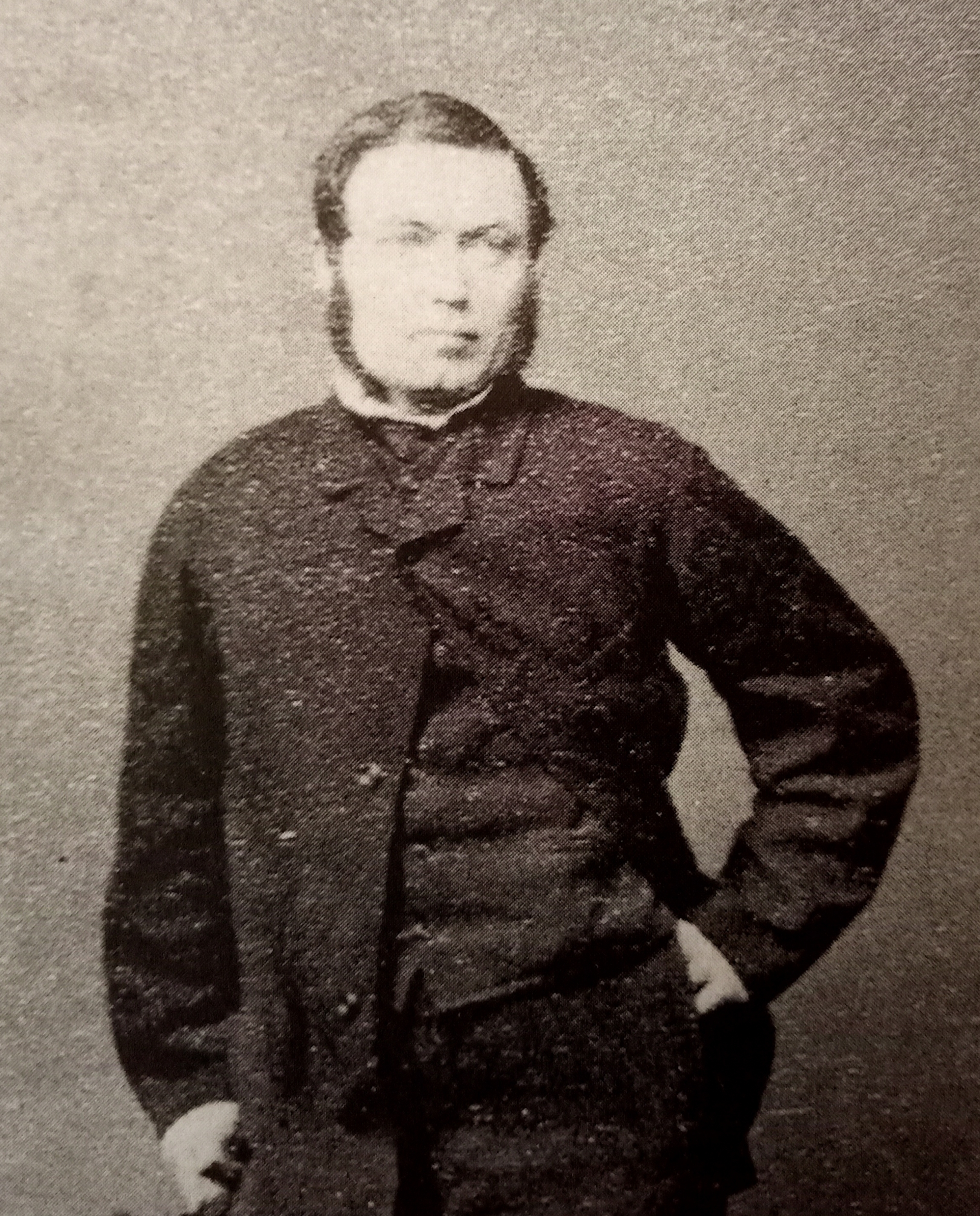
Buckler's collaborator and obituarist Hellins stated that Buckler took his revenge on the photographers by posing for portraits in "all sorts of still attitudes and sullen expressions."

William Buckler (13 September 1814 in Newport, Isle of Wight – 9 January 1884 in Lumley near Emsworth) was an English painter and entomologist who specialized in Lepidoptera.

Buckler trained at the Royal Academy and began a career as a portraitist and watercolorist, practising first in Portman Square, London, and then from the 1860s in Emsworth. When the popularity of photography made portraiture unprofitable, he turned to natural history illustration. In 1857, he became an illustrator of The Larvae of the British Butterflies and Moths edited by Henry Tibbats Stainton and George Taylor Porritt, which was published by the Ray Society. After he painted for three years, he suffered from "scrivener's thumb" and was unable to continue. The 164 plates of hand-coloured illustrations took thirty years to complete. The books were published only after his death, but his descriptions of the caterpillars had already appeared in entomological journals. He formed a close collaboration with Reverend John Hellins and the two raised caterpillars for the artist to paint. Some of them were sent from Germany and he learned German so as to correspond. He died suddenly from bronchitis in 1884.

Buckler's collection is in the Natural History Museum.
