= Cosmopterix asiatica =

Scientific classification
- Kingdom: Animalia
- Phylum: Arthropoda
- Clade: Pancrustacea
- Class: Insecta
- Order: Lepidoptera
- Family: Cosmopterigidae
- Genus: Cosmopterix
- Species: C. asiatica

Binomial name
- Cosmopterix asiatica Stainton, 1859

Synonyms
- Cosmopteryx asiatica

Species of moth from India

Cosmopterix asiatica is a moth in the family Cosmopterigidae. It was described by Stainton in 1859. It is found in India.
