= Nancenoy =

Hamlet in Cornwall, England

Coordinates: 50.110°N 5.175°W

Nancenoy: Cornish: Nans Noy
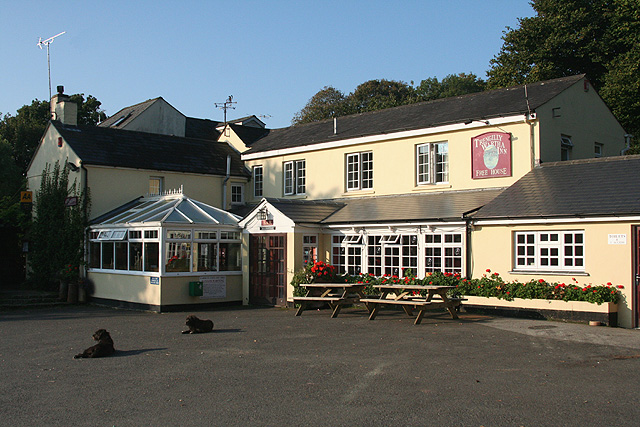
- Trengilly Wartha Inn, Nancenoy

- Location within Cornwall
- OS grid reference: SW731282
- Civil parish: Constantine
- Unitary authority: Cornwall
- Ceremonial county: Cornwall
- Region: South West
- Country: England
- Sovereign state: United Kingdom
- Post town: Constantine
- Postcode district: TR11
- Dialling code: 01326

Nancenoy (Cornish: Nans Noy, meaning Noah's valley) is a hamlet near Constantine in west Cornwall, England, UK.

The Trengilly Wartha Inn is a pub and restaurant which has won the GPG Dining Pub of the Year.
