= Port Navas Creek =

Creek on the River Helford in Cornwall, England

Coordinates: 50.1009°N 5.1409°W

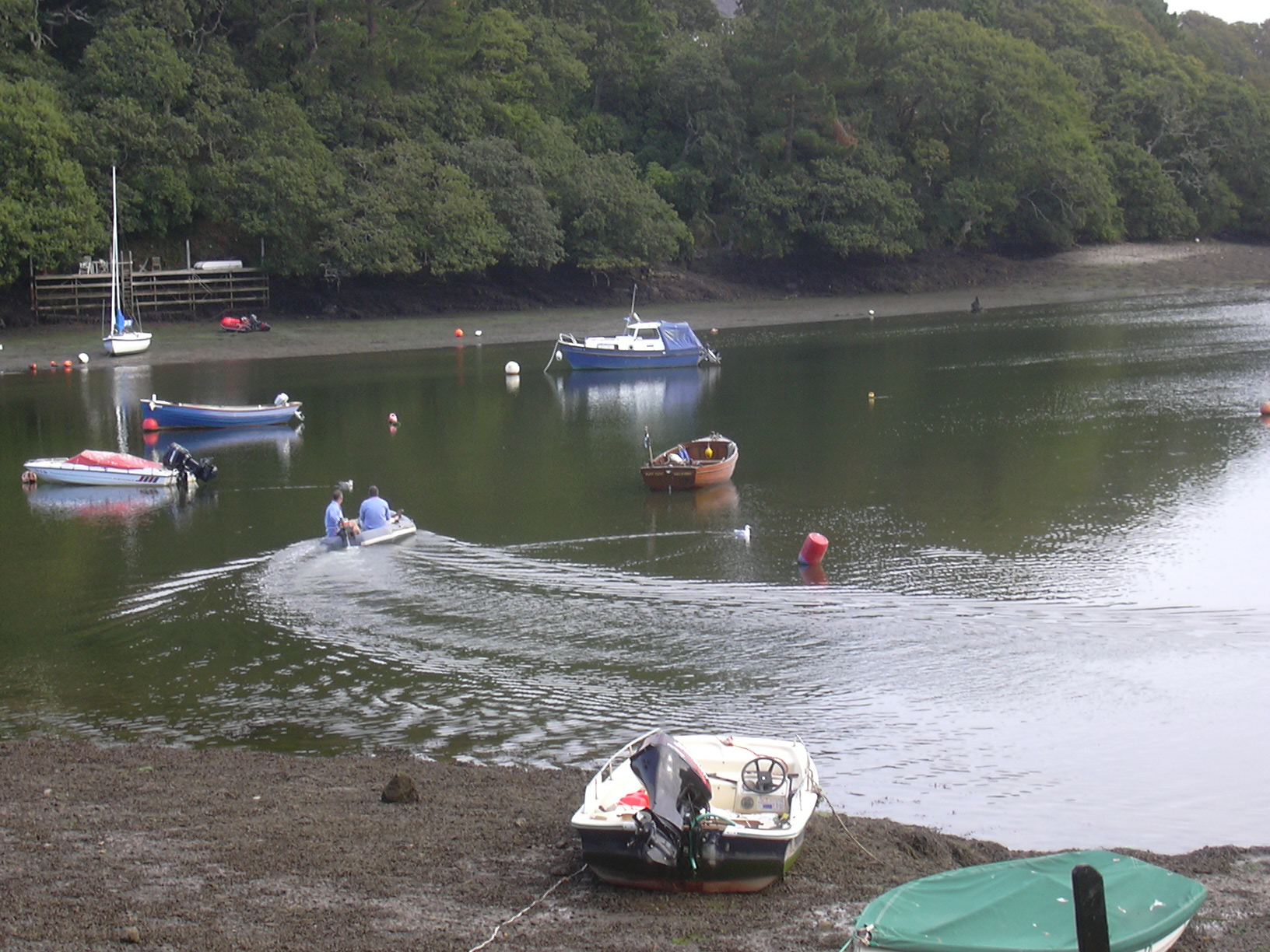
Port Navas Creek

Port Navas Creek (Cornish: Pol Chi Elow, meaning creek of the house of elm trees), or Porthnavas Creek, is one of seven creeks off the Helford River in Cornwall, England, United Kingdom. It splits into three sections with the village of Porth Navas on the west, Trenarth Bridge in the middle and the eastern one is near Budock Veane. The creek is well known for the oyster beds.

== Geography ==
The main section of the creek (grid reference SW7527) is just over 1 km in length, with the branch to Porth Navas on the west, about halfway along. Port Navas Creek lies within the Cornwall Area of Outstanding Natural Beauty (AONB). Almost a third of Cornwall has AONB designation, with the same status and protection as a National Park.

The Helford River Children's Sailing Trust is based on the creek.

== History ==
A focal point of Port Navas is Port Navas Quay – a grade II listed site which has been degraded. A campaign group has been set up to protect and preserve the Quay and to reverse environmental damage in the wider Helford River area.

At the head of the creek was Wheal Anna Maria, a copper, lead and silver mine with some traces of gold. The mine started in 1833 and by 1882 was described as ″deserted″ in The Cornishman newspaper.
