= Constantine, Cornwall =

Village in Cornwall, England

Coordinates: 50.118°N 5.174°W

Constantine: Cornish: Lanngostentin
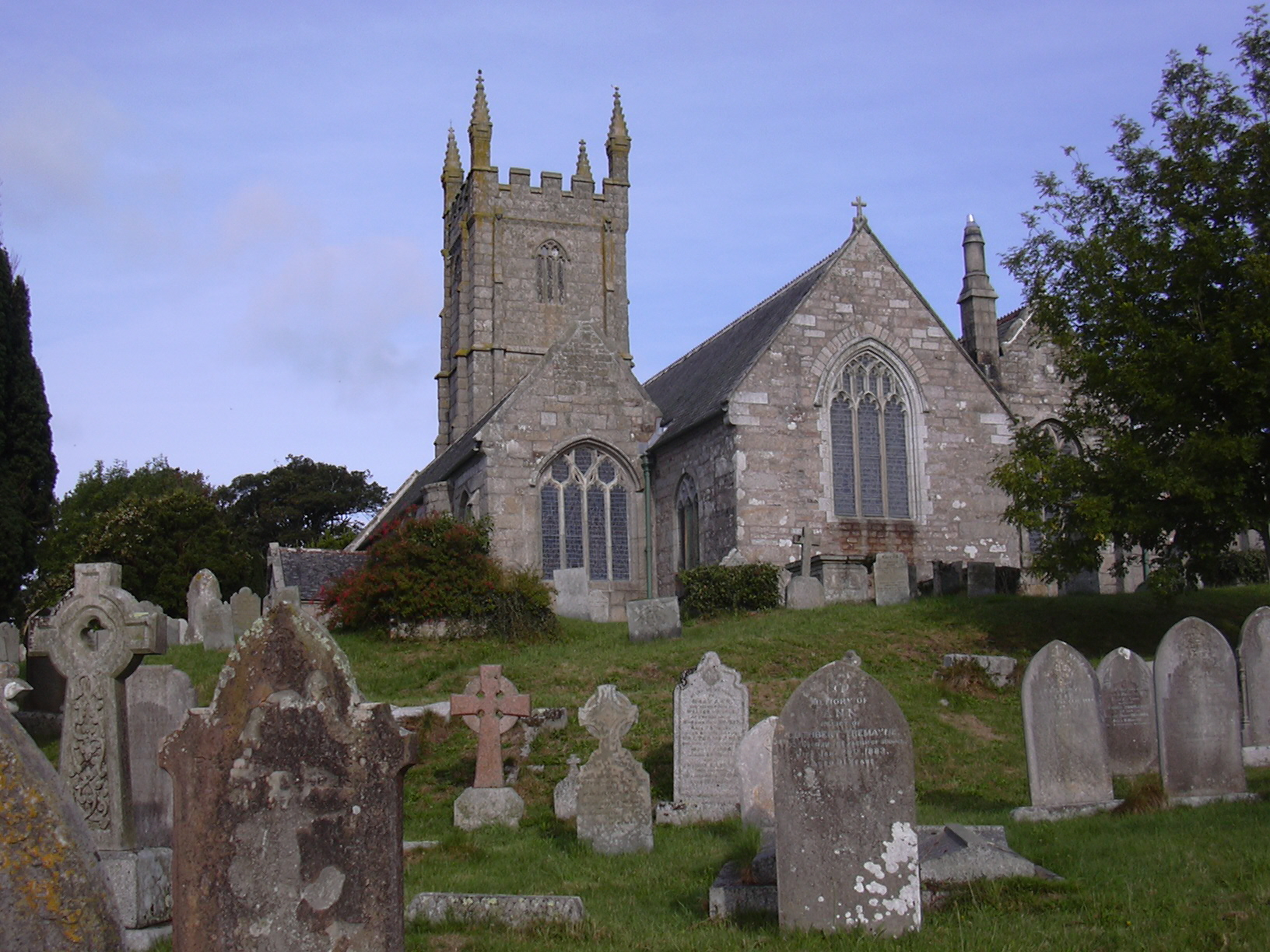
- Constantine's 15th-century church

- Location within Cornwall
- Population: 1,747 United Kingdom Census 2011 including Halvaso
- OS grid reference: SW732291
- Civil parish: Constantine
- Unitary authority: Cornwall
- Ceremonial county: Cornwall
- Region: South West
- Country: England
- Sovereign state: United Kingdom
- Post town: FALMOUTH
- Postcode district: TR11
- Dialling code: 01326
- Police: Devon and Cornwall
- Fire: Cornwall
- Ambulance: South Western
- UK Parliament: Camborne and Redruth

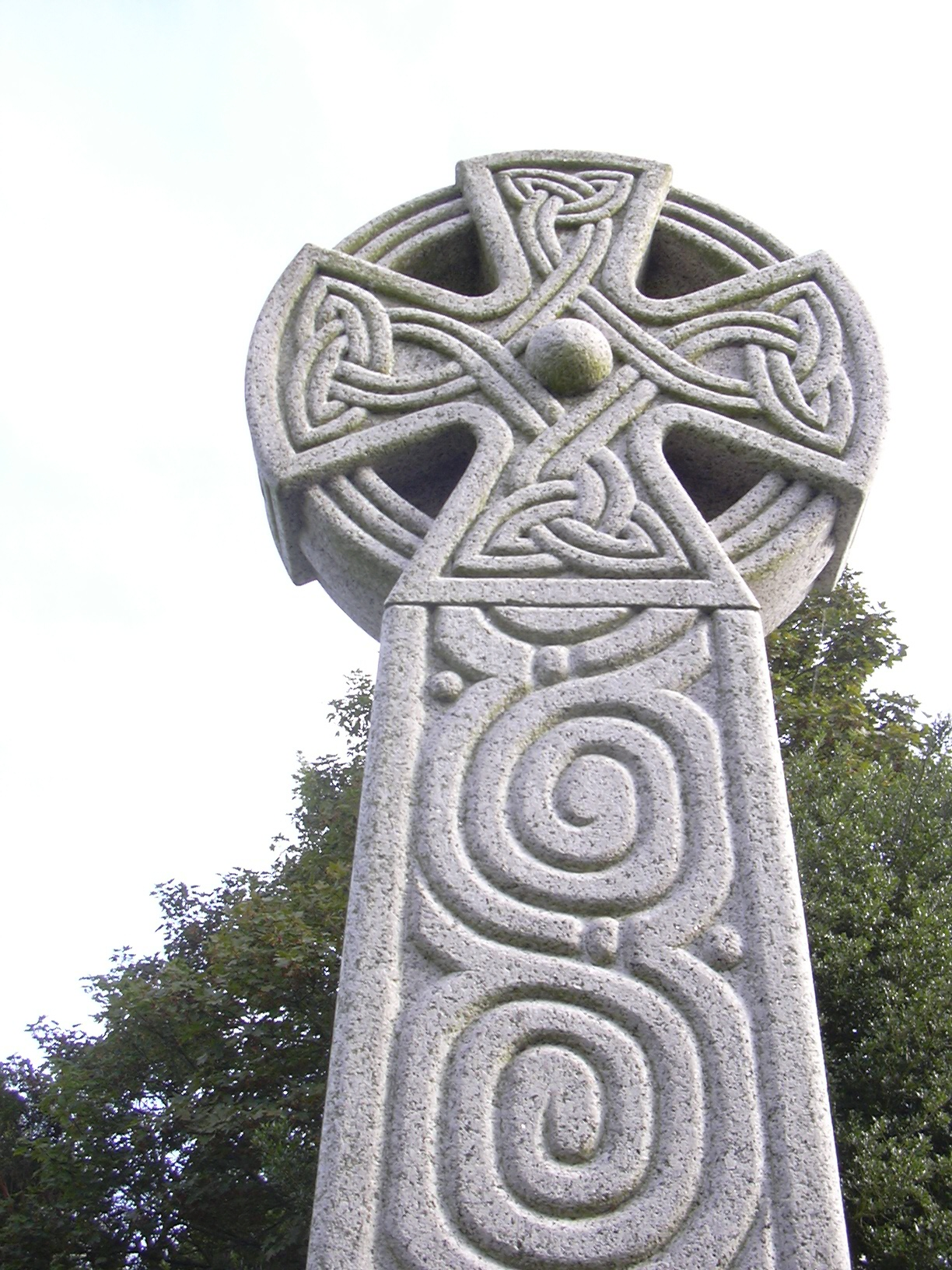
Constantine War Memorial, in the churchyard, carved from local stone by Elkana Symons

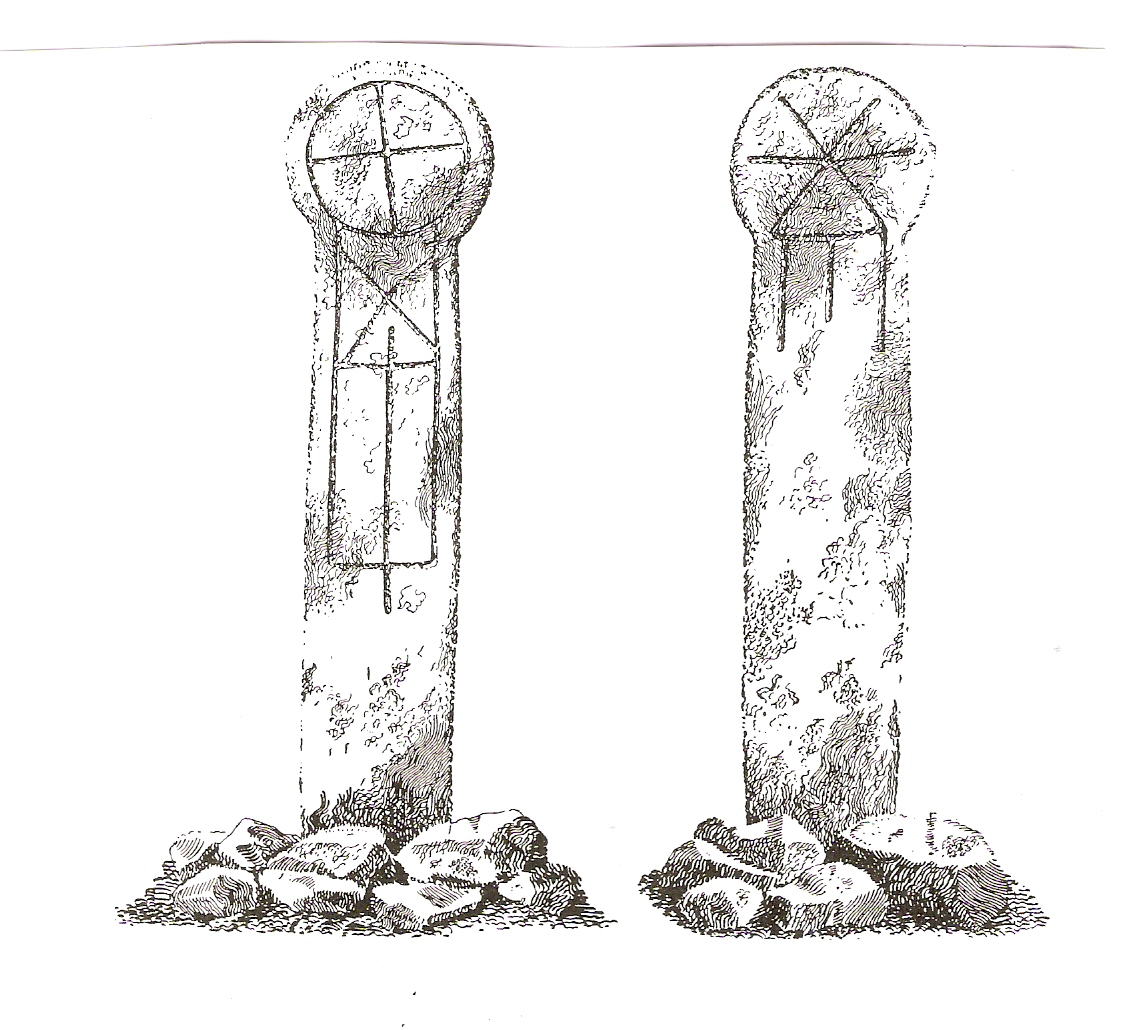
Trewardreva Cross from Arthur Langdon Old Cornish crosses, 1896, page 282: Front and back of the Cornish Cross at the roadside, Trewardreva, near Constantine Churchtown.

Constantine (/ˈkɒns.tənˌtaɪn/) (Cornish: Lanngostentin, meaning church enclosure of St Constantine) is a village and civil parish in Cornwall, England, United Kingdom. It is situated approximately five miles (8 km) west-southwest of Falmouth. The electoral ward also bears the same name but includes Budock Water and the surrounding area. At the 2011 census, the population of the ward was 4,709 and the population of the civil parish was 1,789. The parish of Constantine is bounded by the parishes of Mabe, Mawnan, Gweek, Wendron and the north bank of the Helford River.

Constantine is named after Saint Constantine, a 6th-century Cornish saint identified with king Constantine of Dumnonia.

== History ==
In pre-historic times, a fogou was constructed near Trewardreva: its purpose is unknown.

The ancient name of Constantine, "Langostentyn", implies that the settlement was monastic, with the "Lan" prefix. Dr Lynette Olson (1989) has examined literary and archaeological evidence for all early monastic establishments in Cornwall and found significant doubts about the religious nature of Constantine before the Norman Conquest.

=== After the Norman conquest ===
The land holdings in the parish were the manors of Polwheveral, Trewardreva, Merthen (also a tithing and barton), Tucoys (also a tithing), Treworval and Treviades; the barton of Bonallack; and Trenarth and Budock Vean. Trewardreva Manor House was built circa 1600 and remodelled in 1719–49; the west wing was demolished in 1860. It is now Grade II* listed. Treviades Barton, also Grade II* listed, is a gentry house with historic garden.

Andrew Langdon (1999) lists twelve stone crosses, or parts of crosses located in the parish. One of these was carved and erected in 1991. Several have been transferred from other sites. The stone cross at the cross-roads in High Cross was found in 1992 and re-erected nearby. Arthur Langdon (1896) recorded six Cornish crosses in the parish; in the churchyard, at Bosvathick, at Merthen, at Nanjarrow, at Trevease and at Trewardreva.

=== St Constantine Church ===
Little remains of the Norman church, which was rebuilt between 1420 and 1480: the tower has been called impressive. There is a brass of 1574 to Richard Gerveys and family.

The chancel was rebuilt in 1862 and there was other restoration work between 1859 and 1901. Restoration of the roof timbers (costing £1,200) commenced in 1874, completed in 1878, with the re-opening ceremony held on 22 January 1879 by Edward Benson the Bishop of Truro. In 1882 the north aisle was restored with a new roof of pitch pine and slates, as well as new seating. The restoration of the Bosahan aisle was commenced in the summer of 1882 and completed the following May.

The church was given a grade I listing on 10 July 1957.

Bonallack, Merthen and Carwithenack had chapels before the Reformation. There was also once a chapel at Budock Vean which was founded in Celtic times.

=== Extractive industries ===
The settlement called Constantine Churchtown grew up around the church. Mineral extraction led to an increase in population and the village expanded down what is now called Fore Street, during the 19th century. However, one property, "The Bow Window", is thought to be a 300-year-old farmhouse. The parish had three main industries: agriculture; mining for tin, copper, and iron; and quarrying granite. The largest mine was Wheal Vyvyan, which was worked from 1827 to 1864. The production figures for copper 1845–1864 and for tin ore, 1855–1864, are given in Cornish Mines. The value of copper raised peaked in 1845, 1850 and 1855. The peaks of value in tin ore production were in 1856 and 1863. In 1864, the value of tin raised was only a quarter of the previous year's value and the mine closed.

=== Twentieth-century ===
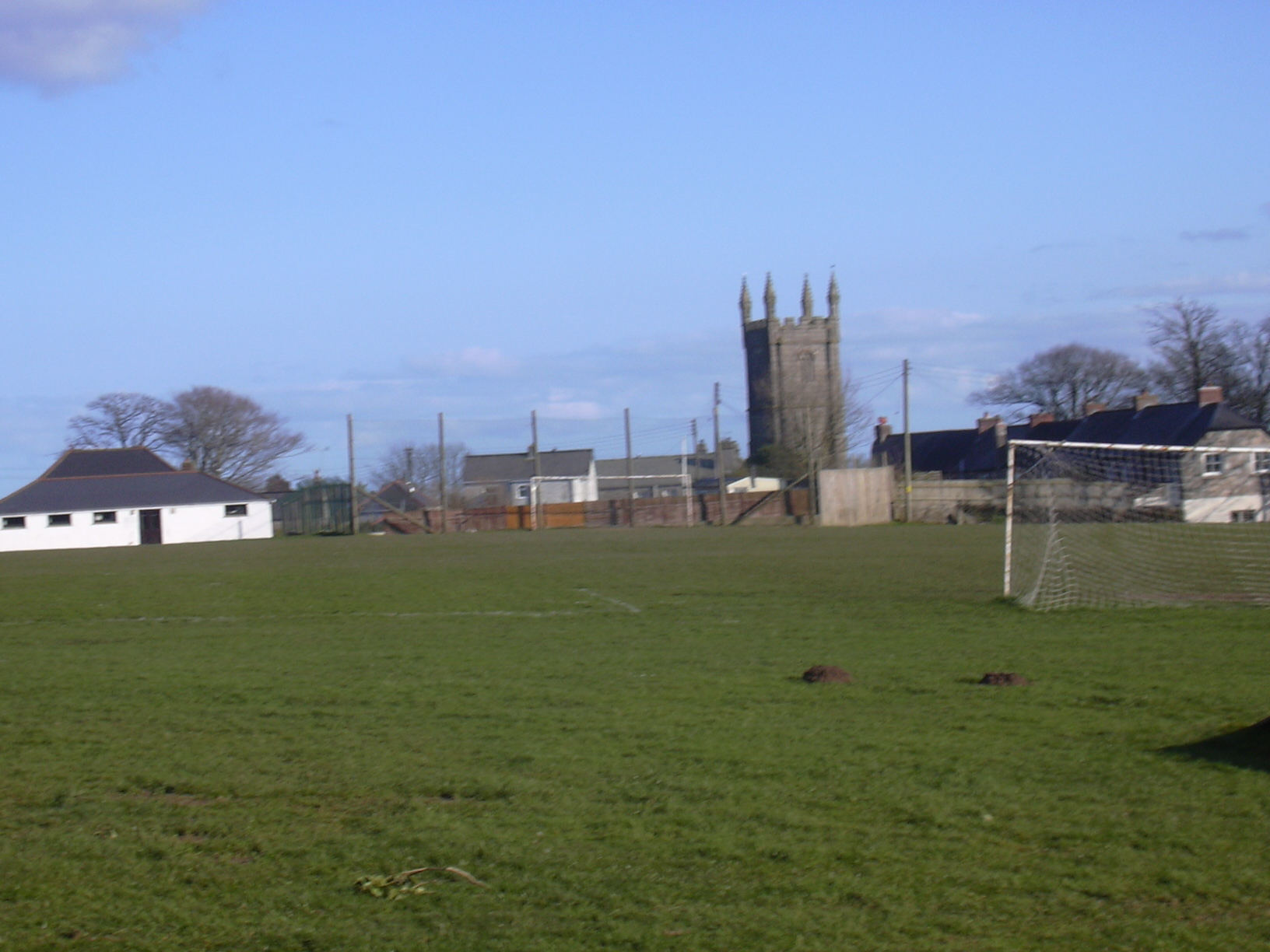
View of the Church and the Recreation Ground, showing the Social Club on the left of the picture

In 1921, Alice Hext of Trebah gave the playing field and sports pavilion to the village, in memory of her husband, Charles Hawkins Hext, who died in 1917. She supported the development of the Sport and Social Club until her death in 1939.

In 1933, overhead cables, providing electricity to homes were installed in the village.

Port Navas has an ancient oyster farm.

== Government and politics ==
Constantine Parish Council has prepared a Parish Plan as a framework for future development/conservation.

== Twinning ==
Like many other Cornish places, Constantine Parish with Gweek, is twinned with a partner in Brittany in western France. In this case the village is twinned with Pont-Croix, Département Finistère. In Breton, "Pont-Croix" is "Pont-e-kroaz" and, colloquially, "Ar Pont".

== Education and language ==
A British School was opened in 1836 at Ponjeravah. After 1957, the school moved to what is now the Church Hall and in 1966 to its present site, the building being refurbished and extended in 2005, as Constantine Primary School. The school is part of Kernow Learning Multi Academy Trust. There is also a pre-school, set in an eco-friendly building on the primary school campus. For secondary education, children have to travel to Helston, Mullion, Falmouth or Penryn.

Constantine parish is the home of five bards of the Cornish Gorseth, including a former Grand Bard, Vanessa Beeman.

== Cultural activities ==
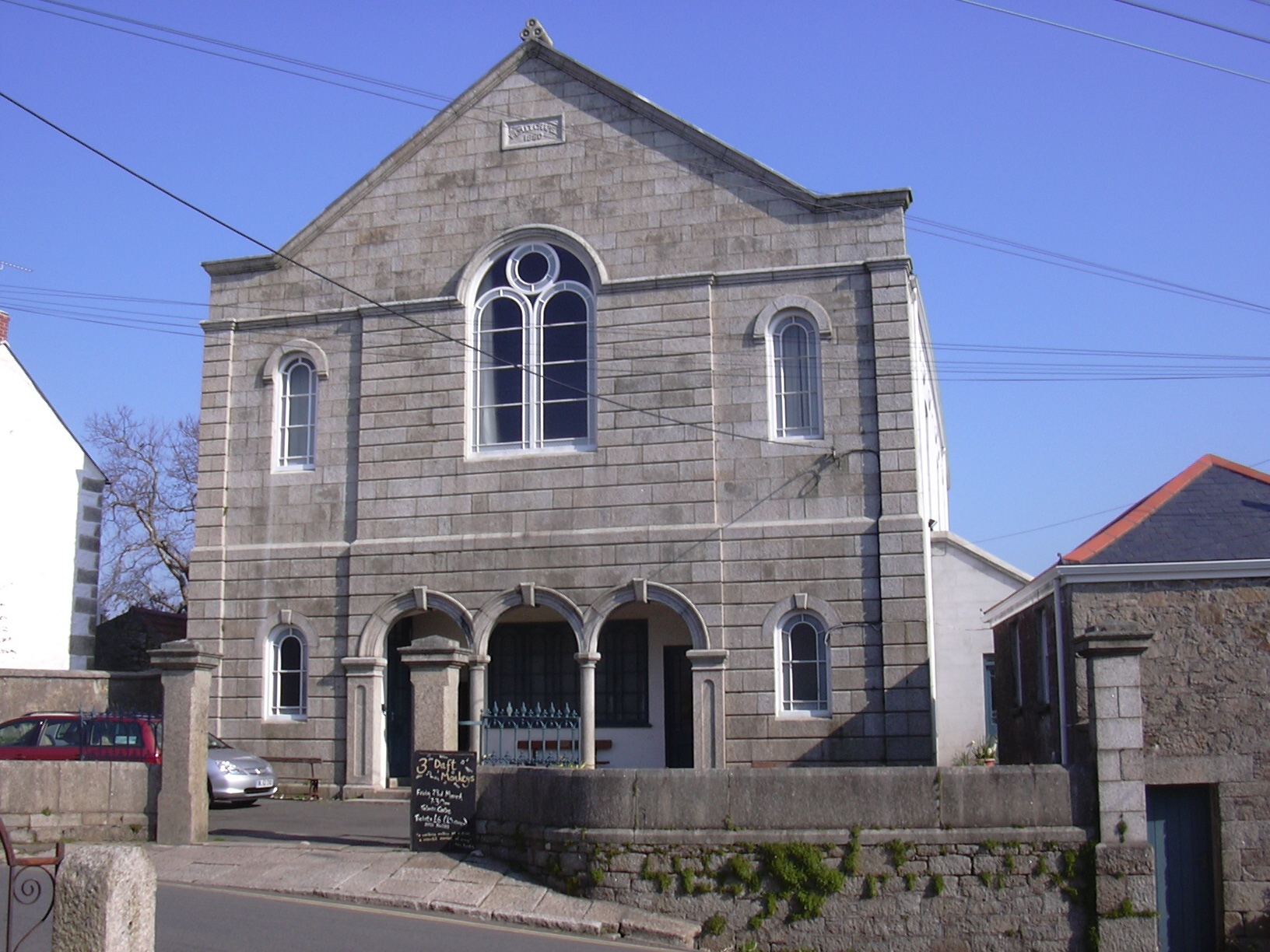
The Tolmen, formerly the Wesleyan Methodist Church

A social enterprise, Constantine Enterprises Company, bought the former Methodist chapel in 1998. A wide range of social and cultural events happen there, all run by volunteers. The building is now known as the Tolmen Centre. The Tolmen Centre has hosted three editions of an international guitar festival, that has attracted a range of concert performers including the Silesian Guitar Octet, Mick Abrahams, Andrea Dieci, Ben Salfield (who also directed the three festivals) and Stonephace (featuring Adrian Utley and Larry Stabbins).

The village has a number of choirs and a Silver band.

In September 2006, Constantine won the Calor Best Village in Cornwall 2006 competition. Constantine was also judged the Best Village in the West of England 2007, in the Business Category.

=== Cornish wrestling ===
Cornish wrestling tournaments, for prizes, have been held in Constantine, for example at the Bowling Green.

=== Annual events ===
Saint Constantine's "Feast" is celebrated in the village, on or around 9 March. The Agricultural Society (founded 1900) and the Cottage Garden Society run shows early in July. The Constantine Social Club runs a carnival, usually on a weekend at the end of July. The Constantine Art Society has a two-week exhibition, starting at the end of July. An annual "Cornish Talk and Taste" festival takes place in January.

== Historic estates ==
Within the parish of Constantine are situated various historic estates including:

- Bosahan, the estate of a branch of the Trefusis family from Mylor
- Carwithenack (Carwythenack), a seat of the Chapman family who had a vault in the Bosahan aisle in the parish church, also the Stapleton family and in the late 14th century of the Tremayne family later of Collacombe in Devon
- Merthen Manor, a seat of the Reskymers and afterwards of the Vyvyans (on the north bank of the Helford River; Merthen Moor is between the estate and the village).
- Trefusis, the original estate of the Trefusis family.

== Place-names in the civil parish of Constantine ==
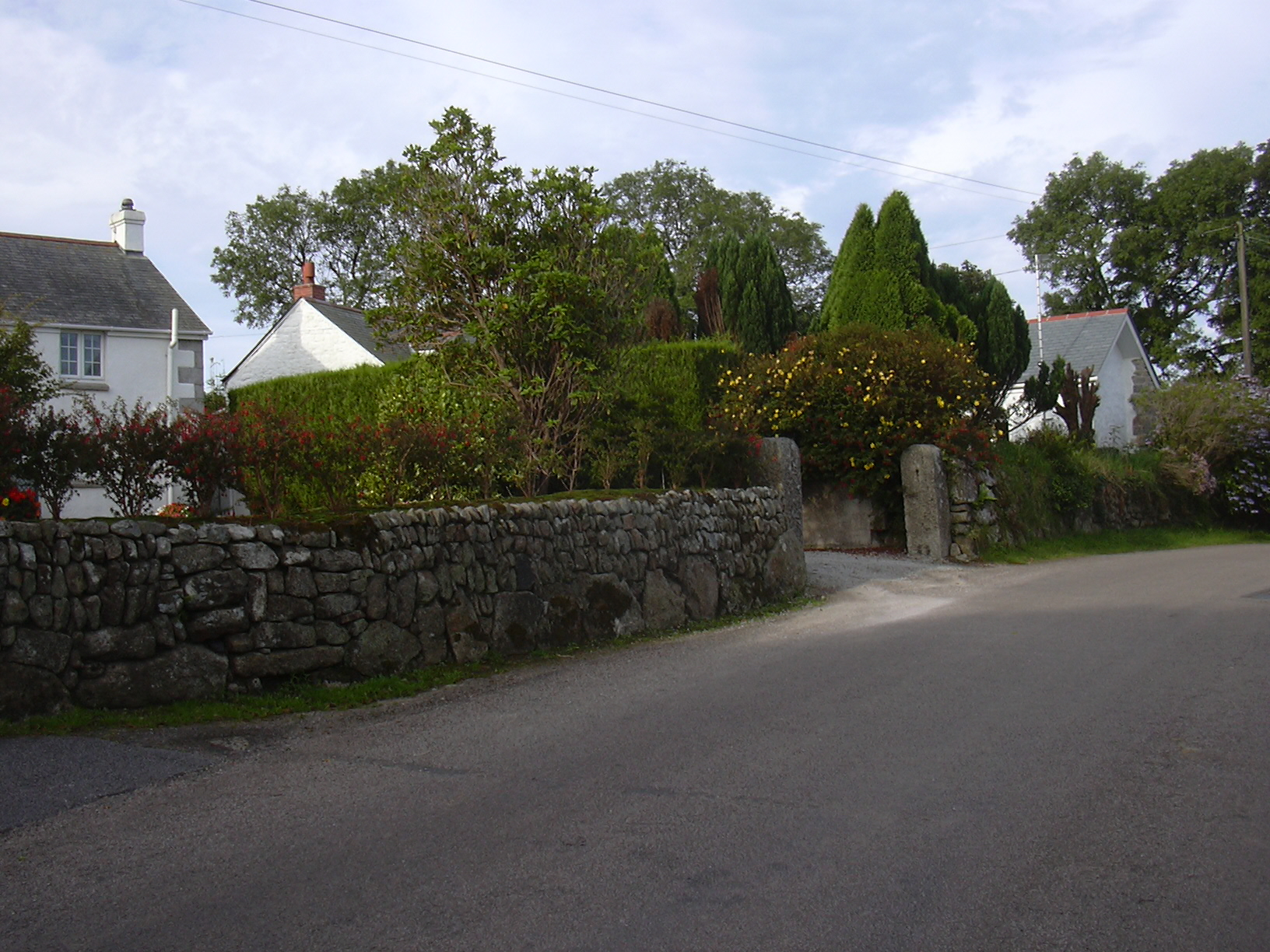
Brill

Bonallack, Bosahan, Bosanarth, Bosawsack, Bosvathick, Boswarch, Boswidjack, Bridge, Brill (a hamlet to the west of the village of Constantine), Brillwater, Calamansac, Carvedras, Goongillings, Groyne Point, High Cross, Job's Water, Lestraynes, Maen Pern, Merthen, Nancenoy, Penbothidno, Penwarn, Polpenwith, Polwheveral, Ponjeravah, Port Navas, Retallack, Scott's Quay, Seworgan, Trebarvah, Trecombe, Tregantallan, Treglidgwith, Treleggan, Trenarth, Trengrove, Tresahor, Tresidder, Trevassack, Trevease, Treviades, Trewardreva, Trewince, Treworvack, Treworvall, Tucoyse.

== Notable people ==
- John Hellins F.R.S., the mathematical astronomer, was curate of Constantine from 1779 to 1783.
- Vanessa Beeman, Grand Bard of Gorseth Kernow September 2006 to September 2009.
