= Bonallack =

Estate

- Location within Cornwall
- 50.09395°N 5.19089°W
- Location: Constantine, Cornwall, England

Listed Building – Grade II
- Official name: Bonallack Barton
- Designated: 17 June 1988
- Reference no.: 1142153

Listed Building – Grade II*
- Official name: Bonallack Barton Cottages
- Designated: 10 July 1957
- Reference no.: 1142154

Bonallack (Cornish: Banadhlek) is an estate and former barton in the civil parish of Constantine, Cornwall. The estate is named after the Banethlek family and is on the northern bank of the Helford River. Bonallack passed into the Jerveys family through marriage in the early 14th-century and to the Grylls family in 1671, again through marriage.

== The Barton of Bonallack ==
The estate is named after the Banethlek family and passed to the Gerveys family when Nichola, the daughter and heiress of John Banethlek, married John Gerveis, of Helston, sometime in the early 14th-century. Three of the Jerveys represented Helston in Parliament. They were,

- J Jerveys – Member of Parliament in 1318, 1332, and 1338
- T Jerveys – 1360 and 1363
- M Jerveys – 1410.

The family were benefactors to the Grade I listed, Church of St Constantine. where there is a brass monument to Richard Geyreys and his wife Jane (nee Trefusis), who were both buried on 2 October 1574. They had sixteen children. The last male heir to own Bonallack was Richard Gerveys, who died in 1658. His daughter and heiress, Elizabeth married Mr Charles Grylls, of Court, Lanreath in 1671.

The wing of the old house was converted to farm-worker cottages in circa 1860. At the same time Colonel S M Gryll's built a large house known as Bonallack Barton for James Tyacke, his tenant farmer, using building rubble from the old house and added an extension in 1898. In 1884 the owner, Lieut-Col S M Grylls put the barton up for auction which was bought by Mr Fred C Baddeley for £5,115. At that time the estate consisted of a ″modern-built genteel residence″, 107 acres (43 ha) of arable land, bailiff's cottage, dairy and carpenter's shop. The farm was under the occupation of a yearly tenant, at an annual rent of £105. who was under notice to quit by Michaelmas, 1885. The advertisement stated that the 190 acres (77 ha) estate was good for freshwater and sea-fishing, and excellent wildfowl shooting, especially woodcock.
