= St Michael's Church, Eastrington =

Church in Eastrington, East Riding of Yorkshire, England

Coordinates: 53°45′36″N 0°47′36″W

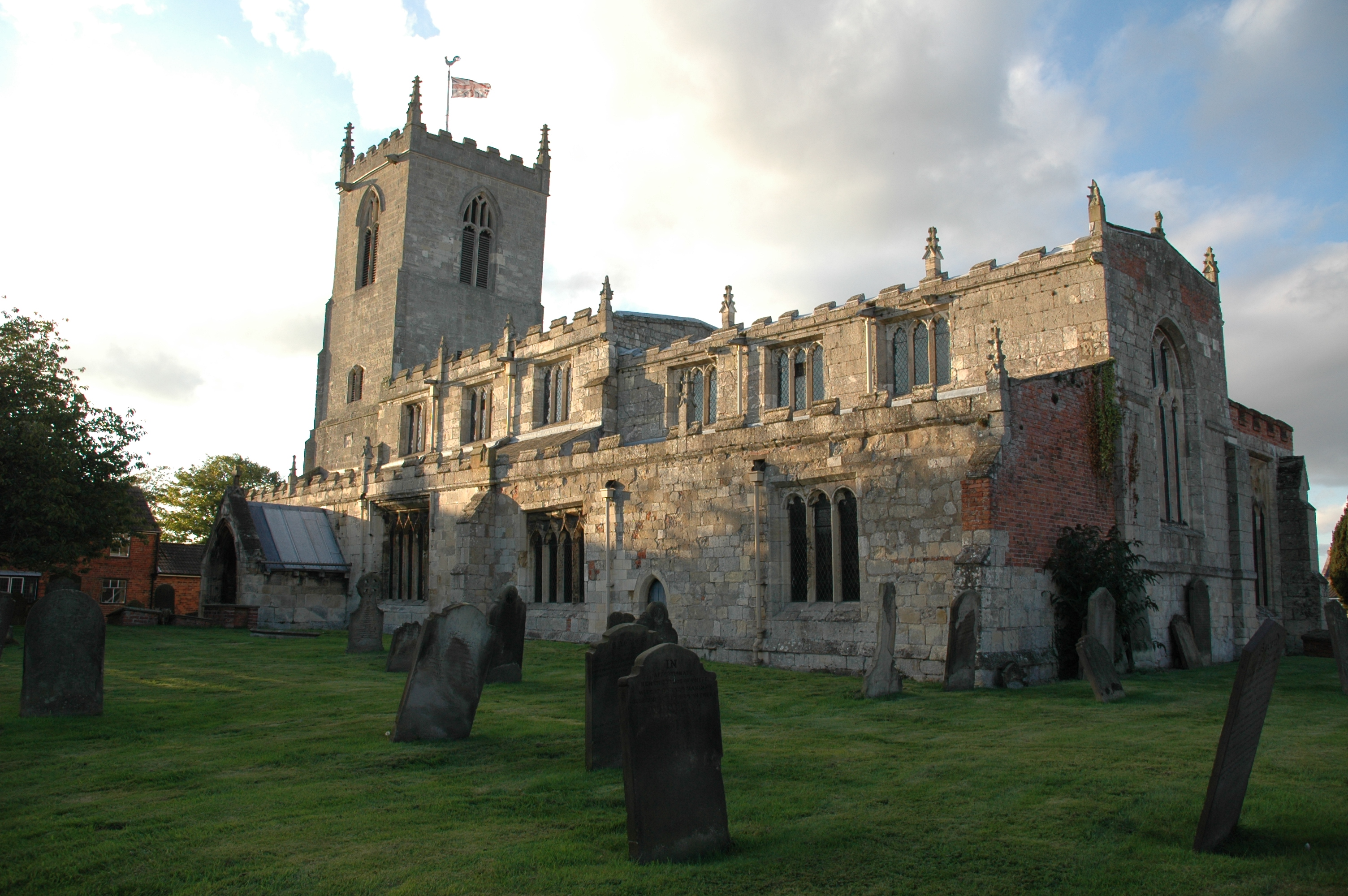
The church, in 2011

St Michael's Church is the parish church of Eastrington, a village in the East Riding of Yorkshire, in England.

The church was built around 1100, from which time parts of the nave and chancel survive. It was altered throughout the 13th, 14th and 15th centuries, the work including the addition of aisles, a tower and clerestories, and replacement of the windows. The chancel partly collapsed in 1632 but was rebuilt later in the year, with funding from Michael Warton. The church was restored in 1896. The church was grade I listed in 1966.

The church is built of limestone with a lead roof, and consists of a nave and a chancel, both with clerestories, the chancel with chapels, north and south full-length aisles, and a west tower embraced by the aisles. The tower has four stages, diagonal buttresses, a chamfered plinth, a pointed west window with a hood mould, and a three-light Perpendicular window with a hood mould and coats of arms above. Over this is a window with a four-centred arch, two-light bell openings, gargoyles, and an embattled parapet with corner crocketed pinnacles. There are also embattled parapets and crocketed pinnacles along the body of the church. In the porch is a Norman frieze depicting animals.

Inside the church, the chancel chapels have aumbries with ogee arches, and there is a font with a 17th-century wooden cover. There is a royal coat of arms dating from 1737, and two damaged 15th-century effigies carved from alabaster. The communion rail is 18th century, while the priest's stall was installed in 1966, designed by George Pace.

== See also ==
- Grade I listed buildings in the East Riding of Yorkshire
- Listed buildings in Eastrington
