= Merthen Manor =

16th-century manor house in west Cornwall, England

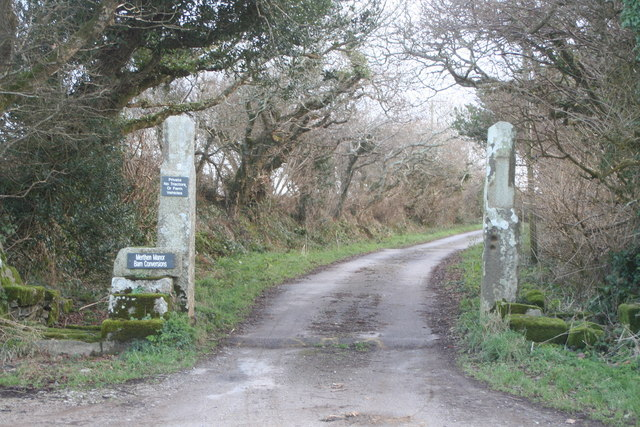
- Entrance to Merthen Manor

- Location within Cornwall
- 50.0937°N 5.1791°W
- Location: Constantine, Cornwall, England

Listed Building – Grade II*
- Official name: Merthen
- Designated: 10 July 1957
- Reference no.: 1142128

Merthen Manor (Cornish: Merdhin, meaning sea fort) is a 16th-century manor house in west Cornwall, England, UK. For most of its history it has been in the ownership of the prominent Cornish family, the Vyvyan family. The house is set in over 100 acres (40 ha) of woodland which, along with the shoreline of the Helford River, is designated as Merthen Woods Site of Special Scientific Interest (SSSI).

== History ==
The land of Merthen was originally part of the manor of Winnianton, which was given to Richard, 1st Earl of Cornwall by his brother, Henry III, in 1225, who then swapped it with Gervase de Tintagel for Tintagel Castle. Ralph Reskymer obtained Merthen in the early part of the 15th century, and it became a family seat of the Reskymers.

John Leland referred to Merthen as being a ruinous manor house in a fair park and a mid 16th-century chart represents it in a wood and with four towers and named Reskymer. The current manor house is thought to have been built in 1575 by John Reskymer and his wife Grace, due to their coat of arms over the entrance, although it may originate earlier and the coat of arms be an indication of a remodelling or reduction. Grace died in 1627, 10 years after her husband, and in 1629 it was sold to Sir Francis Vyvyan of Trelowarren and has remained with the family since. The coat of arms of Reskymer is blazoned "Arg. three bars Gu. in chief a wolf courant Az." (also: "Az. three bars Arg. in chief a wolf (or a wild dog) passant of the first"). The 2-storey porch with the coat of arms is in the north front which has many mullioned windows; the east front is 19th-century.

In the early 19th century the house was remodelled again, and the interior was renovated in the 20th century.

== Estate ==
In the early part of Merthen's history it was the prominent place of the parish and had a deer park. This was one of the deer parks established in the middle ages but has been disparked; however two rectangular enclosures on the estate were still known as the deer parks in the 20th century.

=== Merthen Wood ===
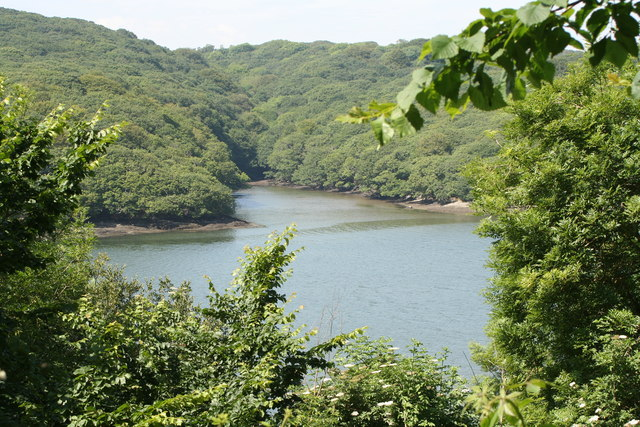
View of Merthen Woods on the Helford River

The woods to the south of the manor house, on the banks of the Helford River, were designated a Site of Special Scientific Interest in 1972 for their biological characteristics. The 72.2-hectare (178-acre) site is of importance due to its population of Sessile Oak (Quercus petraea). Other notable species within the woods include the nationally uncommon Bastard Balm (Melittis melissophyllum) and the nationally rare mosses Fissidens curnowii and Hookeria lucens.

The woods are home to the largest British population of Anchonidium unguiculare rare weevil, which only exist in woodland along the Helford River within Britain.

== Merthen Manor today ==
Merthen Manor, now owned by Mary Vyvyan, is a Grade II* listed building and provides bed & breakfast accommodation in the main house and self-catering accommodation in the converted barn.
