= Portington Hall =

Building in Eastrington, East Riding of Yorkshire, England

Coordinates: 53.7694°N 0.8047°W

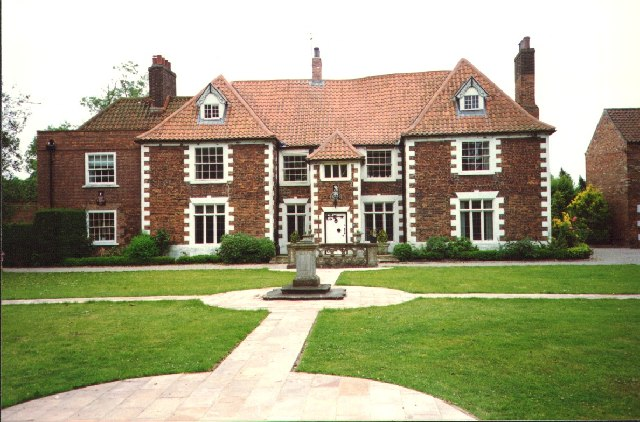
The building, in 1995

Portington Hall is a historic building in Portington, East Riding of Yorkshire, a hamlet in England.

The house was built around 1670 for the Portington family, as a replacement for a moated manor house. It was extended to the north around 1760, and to the rear in the 19th century. In the 1930s, it was restored to a design by William Milner, commissioned by Harold Wilberforce-Bell. John Wesley stayed in the house in 1790. The house was grade II listed in 1954, and is described by Nikolaus Pevsner as a "fine small manor house". It has five reception rooms, a conservatory, kitchen, five bedrooms, a leisure wing, and 3.7 acres (1.5 ha) of grounds.

The house is built of brick on a plinth, with stone dressings, quoins, and hipped pantile roofs. There are two storeys and an E-shaped plan, with a main range of five bays, the middle and outer bays projecting, and a later single-bay extension on the left. The middle bay forms a porch with a doorway, and the ground floor windows are casements. The window above the doorway is fixed, and the other upper floor windows are sashes; all the windows on the main range have quoined surrounds. On the extension are sashes, and the outer bays of the main range have gabled dormers. Inside, the drawing room has mid-18th panelling and a coffered ceiling, and many early doors survive.

== See also ==
- Listed buildings in Eastrington
