= Ponthirwaun =

Village in Ceredigion, Wales

Coordinates: 52.077312°N 4.536275°W

- Location within Ceredigion
- OS grid reference: SN 2629 4514
  - Cardiff: 71.3 mi (114.7 km)
  - London: 192.5 mi (309.8 km)
- Community: Beulah
- Principal area: Ceredigion
- Country: Wales
- Sovereign state: United Kingdom
- Post town: Cardigan
- Postcode district: SA43
- Police: Dyfed-Powys
- Fire: Mid and West Wales
- Ambulance: Welsh
- UK Parliament: Ceredigion Preseli
- Senedd Cymru – Welsh Parliament: Ceredigion

Ponthirwaun is a hamlet in the community of Beulah, Ceredigion, Wales, which is 71.3 miles (114.8 km) from Cardiff and 192.5 miles (309.7 km) from London. Ponthirwaun is represented in the Senedd by Elin Jones (Plaid Cymru) and is part of the Ceredigion Preseli constituency in the House of Commons.

== See also ==
- List of localities in Wales by population
