= Polborder =

Hamlet in Cornwall, England

Coordinates: 50.4619°N 4.2706°W

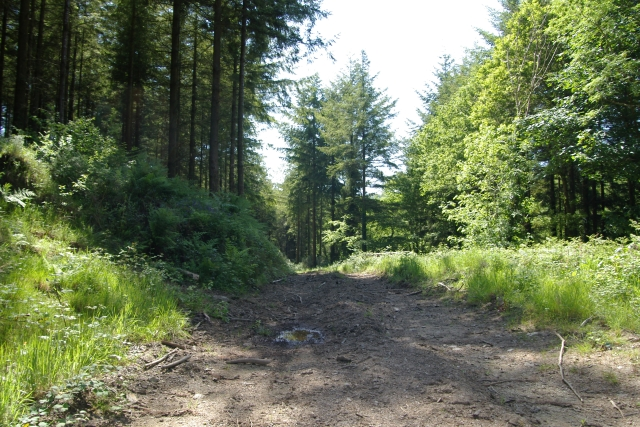
- A woodland track near Polborder

- Location within Cornwall
- OS grid reference: SX3864
- Unitary authority: Cornwall
- Ceremonial county: Cornwall
- Region: South West
- Country: England
- Sovereign state: United Kingdom
- Police: Devon and Cornwall
- Fire: Cornwall
- Ambulance: South Western

Polborder is a hamlet south of St Mellion in Cornwall, England.
