= Porterfield =

Porterfield may refer to:

== People ==
- Porterfield (surname)

== Places ==
- Porterfield, Wisconsin, a town, United States
- Porterfield (community), Wisconsin, an unincorporated community, United States
- Porterfield Lakes, Nova Scotia, Canada
- HM Prison Inverness, also known as Porterfield Prison
- Renfrew Porterfield railway station, Renfrew, Renfrewshire, Scotland

== Other uses ==
- Porterfield Aircraft Corporation, an American aircraft design and manufacturing company founded in 1934
- USS Porterfield, an American naval destroyer in service 1943–69
