= Polwheveral =

Coordinates: 50.112°N 5.167°W

Polwheveral: Cornish: Pollhwevrer
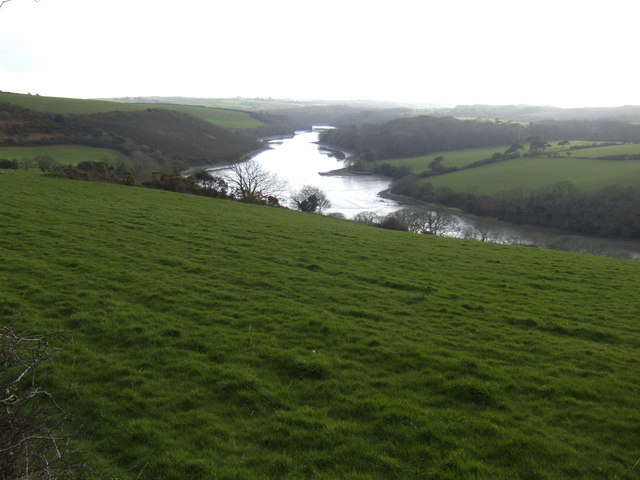
- View down to Polwheveral Creek

- Location within Cornwall
- OS grid reference: SW737284
- Unitary authority: Cornwall
- Ceremonial county: Cornwall
- Region: South West
- Country: England
- Sovereign state: United Kingdom

Polwheveral (Cornish: Pollhwevrer) is a hamlet near Constantine in Cornwall, England. Polwheveral is at the head of a creek of the Helford River.

== Manor ==
The manor of Polwheveral (or Polwheverer) was for part of the Middle Ages held by the family of de Polwheverer; from the latter part of the 16th century it was held by the family of Rise who were resident at Trewardreva. However, when Thomas Rise (died 1621) he had no son and so the family of Trewren became the lords of the manor through the marriage of Thomas Trewren and Jane Rise. The manor remained in the possession of the Trewrens until Thomas Trewren disinherited his son and made his two daughters his heirs. One of them, Mrs. Scott, had a son, the Rev. Charles Scott who sold off the estate in parcels. Polwheveral Wartha was a common and wood belonging to the manor of Polwheveral; Polwheveral Wollas however did not belong to the same manor but to the Lords of Treviades.
