= Poniou =

Coordinates: 50.186°N 5.582°W

- Location within Cornwall
- OS grid reference: SW444380
- Unitary authority: Cornwall
- Ceremonial county: Cornwall
- Region: South West
- Country: England
- Sovereign state: United Kingdom

Poniou or Ponjou is a hamlet west of Zennor in west Cornwall, England. The name is from Cornish "ponjow" meaning "bridges".
