= Poundgate =

Hamlet in East Sussex, England

Coordinates: 51°02′20″N 0°07′51″E

- Hamlet
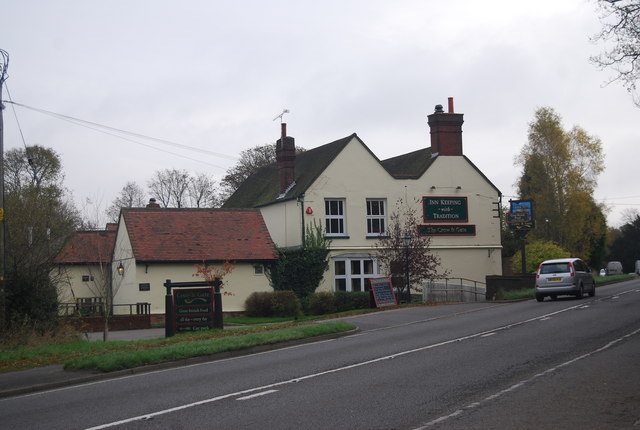
- The Crow and Gate, Poundgate

- Location within East Sussex
- OS grid reference: TQ 4949 2876
  - London: 36 mi (58 km)
- District: Wealden
- Shire county: East Sussex
- Region: South East
- Country: England
- Sovereign state: United Kingdom
- Post town: Crowborough
- Postcode district: TN6 3
- Dialling code: 01892
- Police: Sussex
- Fire: East Sussex
- Ambulance: South East Coast
- UK Parliament: Wealden

Poundgate is a hamlet in East Sussex on the A26 Uckfield Road at the junction with Chillies Road, just south of Crowborough. It has one pub, the Crow and Gate, on the main road and a scattering of mainly detached houses.

The name was first recorded in 1564, and is derived from a gate into Ashdown Forest, which Poundgate lies at the south-eastern edge of. The hamlet is in the civil parish of Buxted, for which its population was accounted for in the 2011 census.

Bus services connect to Crowborough and Brighton. The nearest station is Crowborough with an hourly train service to London Bridge and to Uckfield. The Vanguard Way path goes through the hamlet.
