= Ponsongath =

Coordinates: 50.01919°N 5.13442°W

Ponsongath: Cornish: Pons an Gath
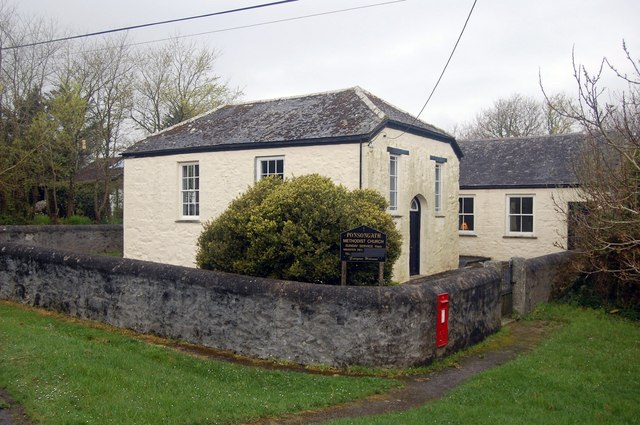
- Ponsongath Methodist Church

- Location within Cornwall
- OS grid reference: SW7517
- Unitary authority: Cornwall
- Ceremonial county: Cornwall
- Region: South West
- Country: England
- Sovereign state: United Kingdom
- Police: Devon and Cornwall
- Fire: Cornwall
- Ambulance: South Western

Ponsongath (Cornish: Pons an Gath) is a hamlet west of Coverack in west Cornwall, England.

In 2017 Ponsongath Methodist Church merged with the Methodist church at St Keverne.

The name Ponsongath comes from the Cornish language Pons an Gath, which means 'the cat bridge'.
