= Portnaluchaig =

Coordinates: 56.93533°N 5.85082°W

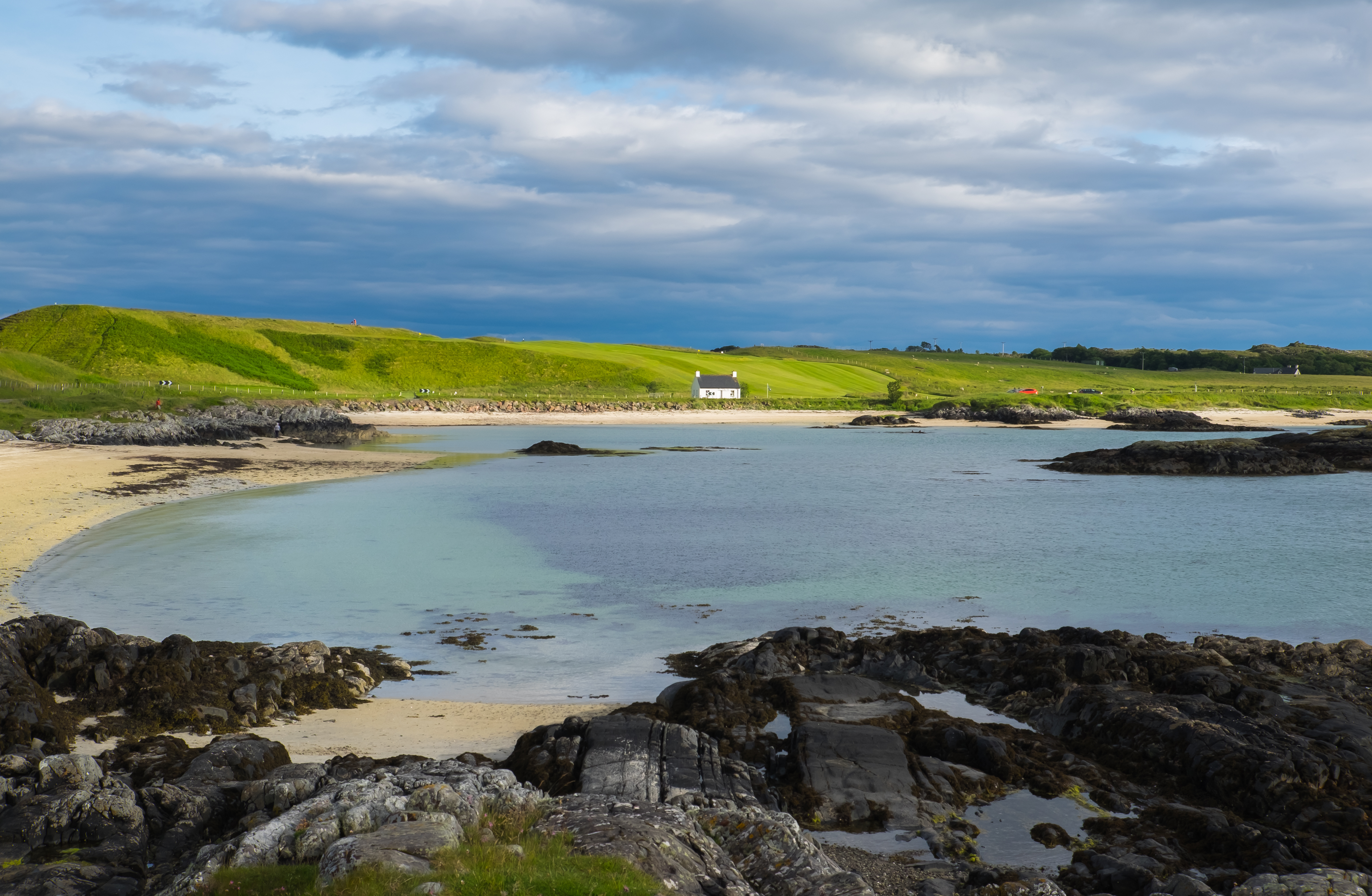
- The beach over Lòn Liath

- Location within the Lochaber area
- OS grid reference: NM658892
- Council area: Highland
- Country: Scotland
- Sovereign state: United Kingdom
- Post town: Arisaig
- Postcode district: PH39 4
- Police: Scotland
- Fire: Scottish
- Ambulance: Scottish

Portnaluchaig is a coastal hamlet, located 2 miles north of Arisaig in the Highlands of Scotland and is also in the council area of Highland.

The Small Isles of Eigg, Muck and Rùm are visible from Portnaluchaig.
