= Polpenwith =

Coordinates: 50.105°N 5.170°W

Polpenwith: Cornish: Pollpennrudh
- Location within Cornwall
- OS grid reference: SW734276
- Unitary authority: Cornwall
- Ceremonial county: Cornwall
- Region: South West
- Country: England
- Sovereign state: United Kingdom

Creekside house at Polpenwith

Polpenwith (Cornish: Pollpennrudh, meaning pool of the red headland) is a hamlet south of Constantine in west Cornwall, England. It is at the head of a creek which leads to the Helford River.
