= Ponjeravah =

Hamlet in Cornwall, England

Coordinates: 50.118°N 5.166°W

Ponjeravah: Cornish: Pons a Revedh
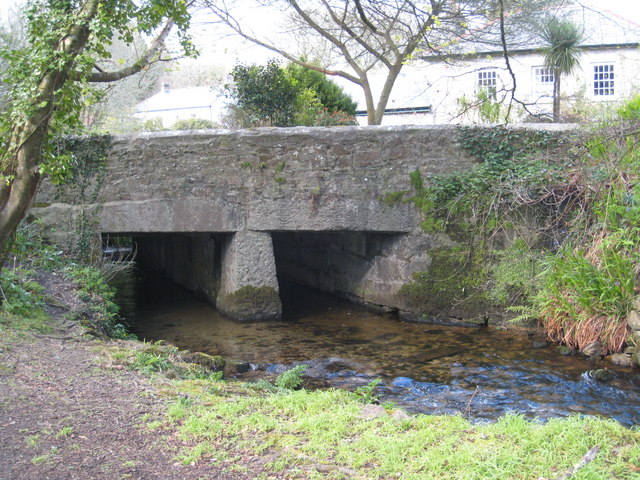
- Ponjeravah Bridge

- Location within Cornwall
- OS grid reference: SW738290
- Unitary authority: Cornwall
- Ceremonial county: Cornwall
- Region: South West
- Country: England
- Sovereign state: United Kingdom

Ponjeravah (Cornish: Pons a Revedh) is a hamlet near to and east of Constantine in Cornwall, England.
