= Porth-y-Felin =

Coordinates: 53.317163°N 4.640766°W

- Location within Anglesey
- OS grid reference: SH 242 833
  - Cardiff: 141 mi (227 km)
  - London: 227.4 mi (366.0 km)
- Community: Holyhead
- Principal area: Anglesey
- Country: Wales
- Sovereign state: United Kingdom
- Post town: Holyhead
- Police: North Wales
- Fire: North Wales
- Ambulance: Welsh
- UK Parliament: Ynys Môn
- Senedd Cymru – Welsh Parliament: Ynys Môn

Porth-y-Felin is an area of Holyhead, Isle of Anglesey, Wales, which is 141 miles (226.9 km) from Cardiff and 227.4 miles (365.9 km) from London.

== See also ==
- List of localities in Wales by population
