= Alfred Porterfield =

Scottish footballer

Personal information
- Full name: Alfred Porterfield
- Date of birth: 1869
- Date of death: Unknown
- Position: Goalkeeper

Senior career*
Years	Team	Apps	(Gls)
	King's Park	?	(?)
1894–1895	Burnley	2	(0)
- * Club domestic league appearances and goals

Alfred Porterfield (1869 in Derry – ?) was a professional footballer who played as a goalkeeper. He started his career in Scotland with Thistle FC then moved to Bootle where he played in 2 official FA Cup ties in 1890. His opponents were Newton Heath and Halliwell. Re-joined Thistle FC then signed for, Clyde. King's Park, before moving to Burnley in 1894, where he played two matches in the English Football League and ended his career with Cartvale. He died in Glasgow Green Public Park of a heart attack on the 4th of May 1922.
