= John Hellins =

British teacher and astronomer (c. 1749–1827)

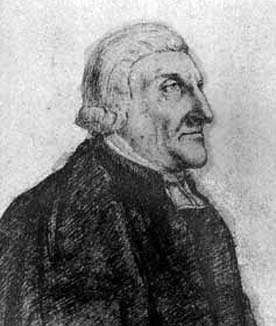
Portrait of John Hellins (1749-1827), British mathematician.

This subject should not be confused with his grandson John Hellins, 1829–1887, clergyman and entomologist.

John Hellins FRS (c. 1749 – 5 April 1827) was a British autodidact, schoolteacher, mathematician, astronomer and country parson.

== Early years ==
Hellins was born in Devon c. 1749, the son of a poor family, and the parish apprenticed him to a cooper.

He became a schoolteacher and through hard work and patronage became assistant to Nevil Maskelyne, the Astronomer Royal in 1773.

== Service as priest ==
Hellins went on to become a clergyman, serving as a curate at Constantine, Kerrier (1779–83) and afterwards at Greens Norton, near Towcester. In 1789 he was entered as a 'ten-year man' at Trinity College, Cambridge, and eventually graduated BD in 1800. In 1790 he was presented to the vicarage of Potterspury in Northamptonshire. On 10 November 1794 he married Anne Brock of North Tawton. He founded the village school in Potterspury: today the John Hellins Primary School bears his name.

== Recognition of his scientific contribution ==
Hellins' mathematical and astronomical learning was noted. He became a Fellow of the Royal Society in 1796. Three years later (1799), he was awarded the Copley Medal largely for his paper on computing the perturbations of planets.

=== Analytical Institutions ===
Hellins supervised the translation from Italian of the Instituzioni analitiche ad uso della gioventù italiana by Maria Gaetana Agnesi, which was published in 1801 by Taylor and Wilks, London as Analytical Institutions in Four Books

=== Davies Gilbert's eulogy ===
The Gentleman's Magazine in 1828, printed the eulogy on Hellins's life and achievements, given at a meeting of the Royal Society, by Davies Gilbert, its president:

One of those extraordinary men, who, deprived of early advantages, have elevated themselves, by the force of genius of industry, to a level above most persons blessed with regular education.

In 1787 he edited The Young Algebracist's Companion. In 1788, he published Mathematical Essays, on several subjects and in 1802 in two volumes, The Analytical Institutions, originally written in Italian, by Maria Gaetana Agnesi, translated by John Colson. Taking orders, Hellins was for some time curate of Constantine in Cornwall and, afterwards, of Greens Norton, Northamptonshire, but in 1790 he was presented by the Earl Bathurst to the vicarage of Potterspury in Northamptonshire. He was elected a Fellow of the Royal Society in 1796, and in 1800 took the degree of BD at Trinity College, Cambridge.

Hellins at one time computed the Nautical Almanac. He later assisted at Greenwich and, furnished William Windham with calculations and tables on which to base his new military system, as Minister of War, in 1806.

Hellins applied himself also branches of pure mathematics. Nine communications from him appeared in the Philosophical Transactions:

- On the summation of series.
- On the conversion of slowly-converging series into others of swifter convergency.
- On their application to the calculation of logarithms, and to the verifying of circular area.
- On the roots of equations.

And in 1798,

- On method of computing with increased facility the planetary perturbations.

For the last he was honoured with the Copley Medal.

Hellins also occasionally furnished mathematical articles to the British Critic, from the year 1795 to 1814. They included:

- On Mr. Wales' Method of finding the Longitude, Vol. 6. p. 413.
- On Bishop Horsley's Mathematical Treatises, Vol. 21. p. 272.
- On Donna Agnesi's Analytical Institutions, of which he superintended the publication, Vol. 23. p. 143; Vol. 24. p. 653; and 25. p. 141.
- On Keith's Trigonometry, Vol. 31. p. 489.
- On F. Baily's work, on the Doctrine of Interest and Annuities, Vol. 38. p. 622, and Vol. 43. p. 502.

When the first series of the British Critic closed, the connection with Hellins with the work is supposed to have ceased.

Hellins retired to the small living of Pottersbury in Northamptonshire. He married Miss Anne Brock, a Devonshire lady, who survived him but a short time, and by whom he left an only son, William.

== Death ==
He died in Potterspury 5 April 1827, leaving one son (William Brock Hellins) by his wife Anne. In the North Aisle of the parish church of St. Nicholas is a small tablet of white marble, inscribed:

In Memory of
The REVD. JOHN HELLINS, B.D. & F.R.S.
upwards of 36 years Vicar of this parish, who died April 5th 1827
aged 78 years.
of ANNE HELLINS his widow, who died June 3rd 1827. Aged 72.
