= Polmorla =

Coordinates: 50.508°N 4.844°W

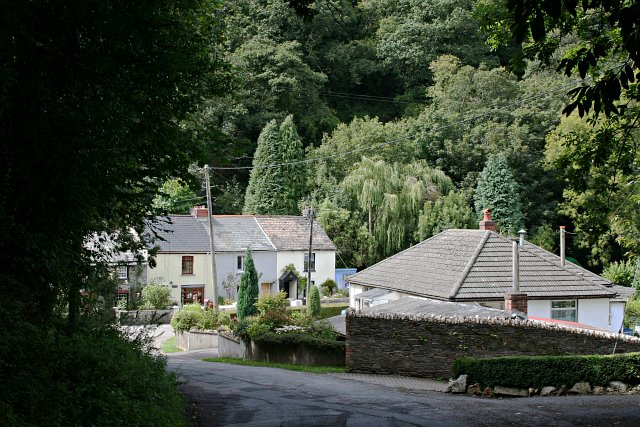
- Polmorla

- Location within Cornwall
- OS grid reference: SW983715
- Civil parish: St Breock
- Shire county: Cornwall
- Region: South West
- Country: England
- Sovereign state: United Kingdom
- Post town: Wadebridge
- Postcode district: PL27
- Dialling code: 01208
- Police: Devon and Cornwall
- Fire: Cornwall
- Ambulance: South Western
- UK Parliament: North Cornwall

Polmorla is a hamlet just southwest of Wadebridge, Cornwall, England, United Kingdom, map reference SW983715. The Polmorla brook is a tributary of the River Camel, and rises on St Breock Downs.
