= Henry Tibbats Stainton =

British entomologist

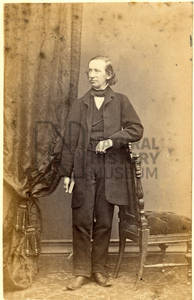
Henry Tibbats Stainton

Henry Tibbats Stainton (13 August 1822 – 2 December 1892) was an English entomologist. He served as an editor for two popular entomology periodicals of his period, The Entomologist's Annual and The Entomologist's Weekly Intelligencer.

== Biography ==
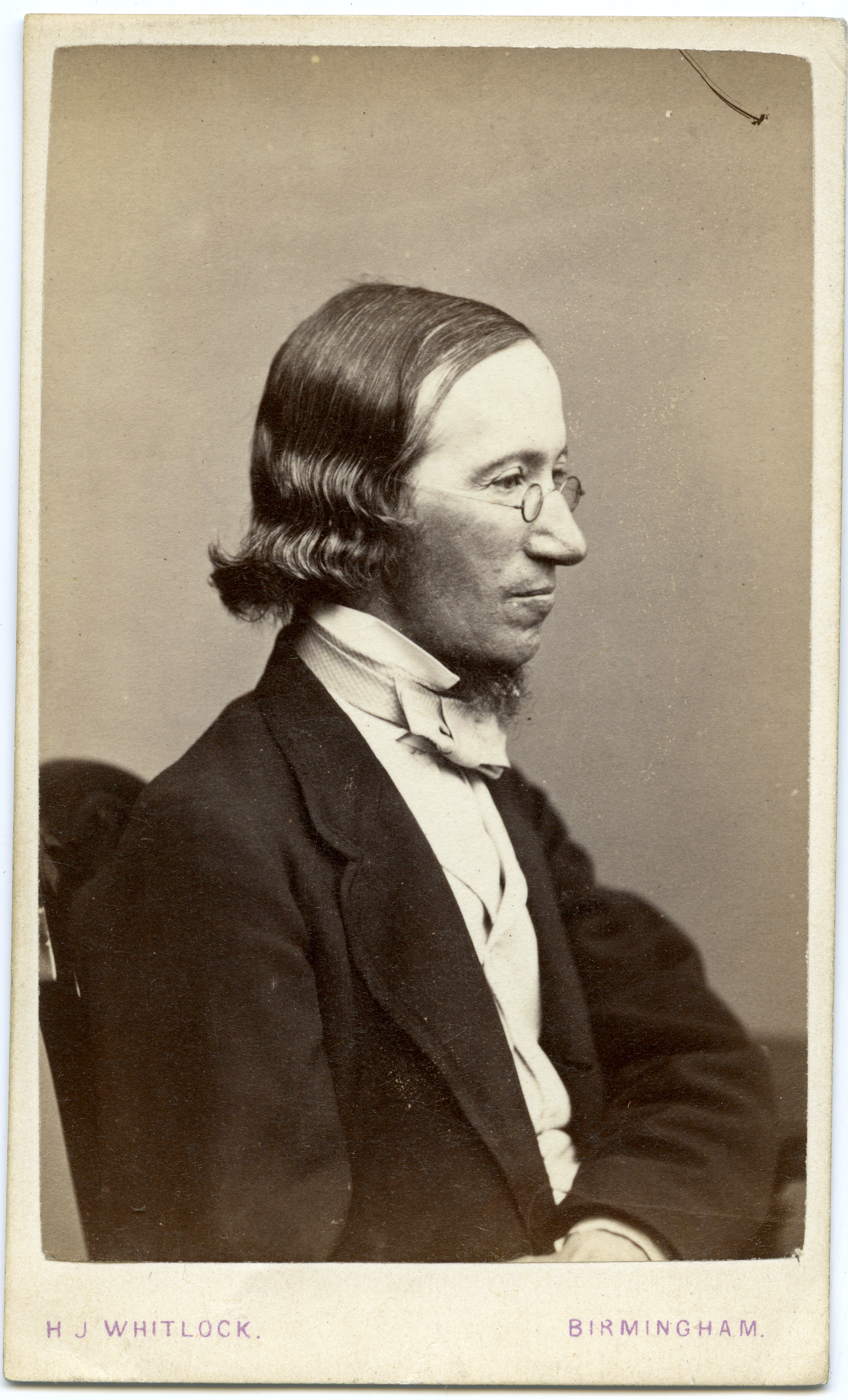
C. 1868

Stainton was the son of Henry Stainton, belonging to a wealthy family in Lewisham. After being privately tutored, he went to King's College London. He was the author of A Manual of British Butterflies and Moths (1857–59) and with the German entomologist Philipp Christoph Zeller, a Swiss, Heinrich Frey and another Englishman, John William Douglas of The Natural History of the Tineina (1855–73). He undertook editing William Buckler's and John Hellins' work, following their deaths: The Larvae of the British Butterflies and Moths. He was also a prolific editor of entomological periodicals, including the Entomologist's Weekly Intelligencer (1856–61) and the Entomologist's Monthly Magazine (1864 until his death – the magazine continues to be published).

Stainton was a very wealthy man and his house in Lewisham, "Mountsfield", was one of London's more substantial residences set in its own park. Other wealthy entomologists often stayed at Mountsfield when visiting London, notably Alexander Henry Haliday and Deiterich Carl August Dohrn. The zoologist Nicholas Aylward Vigors was a close friend. Such people, sought by the growing number of scientific societies, wielded enormous influence on scientific development. Stainton was a regular visitor to both Haliday's house in Lucca and to Dohrn's in Stettin. He was a member of both the Entomological Society of London and the Stettin Entomological Society. Besides this, from 1856, he encouraged interest in entomology among the wider public by holding weekly 'open evenings' at his house. Anyone over the age of 14 could freely visit Mountsfield on such evenings, perhaps to have a specimen identified; to view his collection; use his library; or simply to learn more about entomology from Stainton himself, or other guests who may have been present. The home of his family no longer stands but a Stainton road runs beside Mountsfield Park.
