= George Taylor Porritt =

English naturalist

George Taylor Porritt (1848–1927) was an English wool merchant, naturalist and lepidopterist from Huddersfield, Yorkshire. He is best known for his work on the effects of industrial pollution on the changes in frequency of melanin in populations of the peppered moth, which has since become a prominent case study in understanding the effects of pollution on animal populations.

He attended Huddersfield College alongside future prime minister H. H. Asquith. He became a prominent authority on entomology in Great Britain and was involved in a substantial number of publications and societies. He was the re-founder and co-editor of The Naturalist, a Fellow of the Linnean Society and President of the Yorkshire Naturalists' Union in 1900. His collection of insects was donated to the Tolson Museum after his death.
