= Porth Navas =

Village in Cornwall, England

Coordinates: 50°6′N 5°9′W

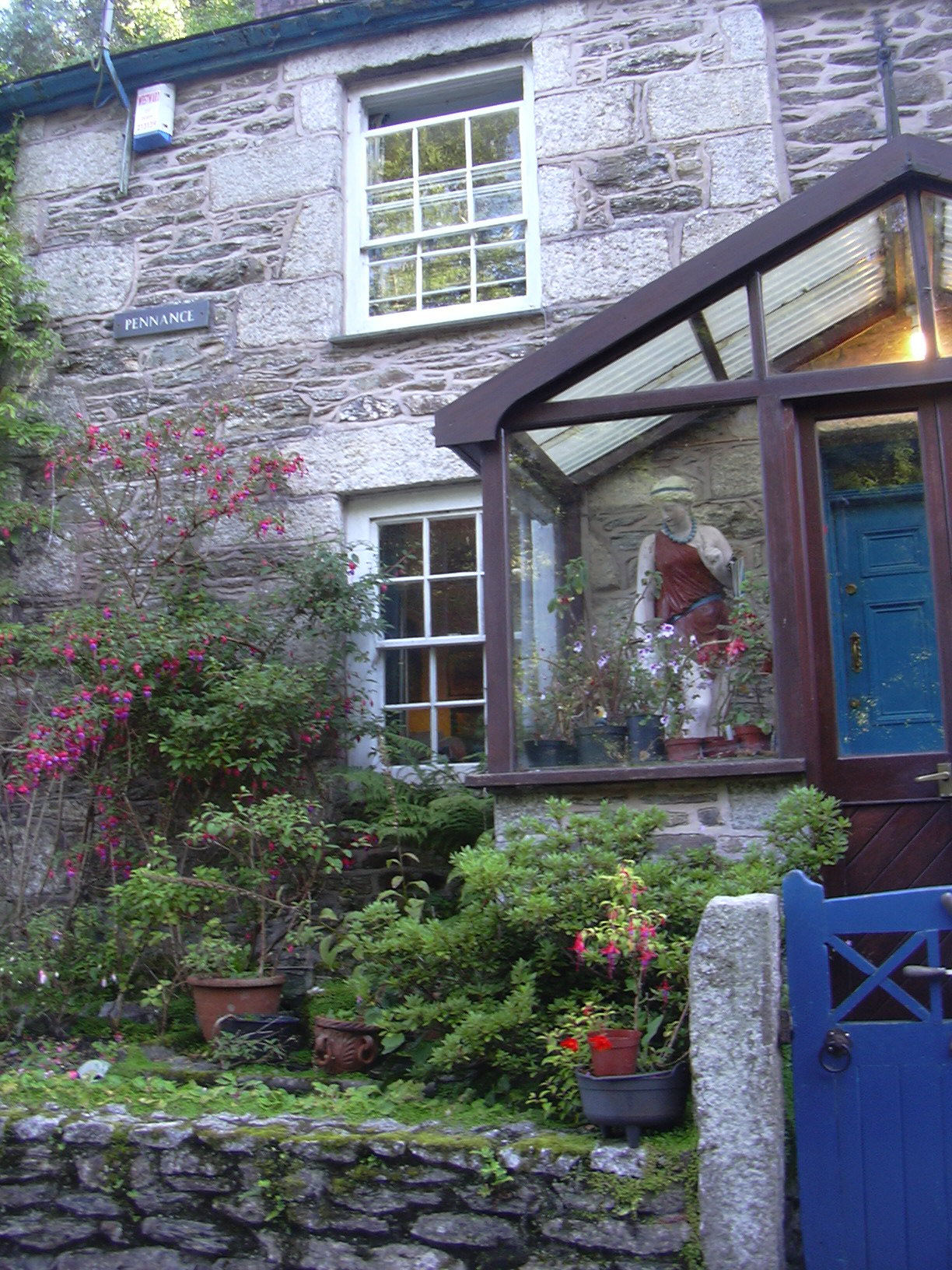
House in Porth Navas, Kerrier, Cornwall with two painted statues

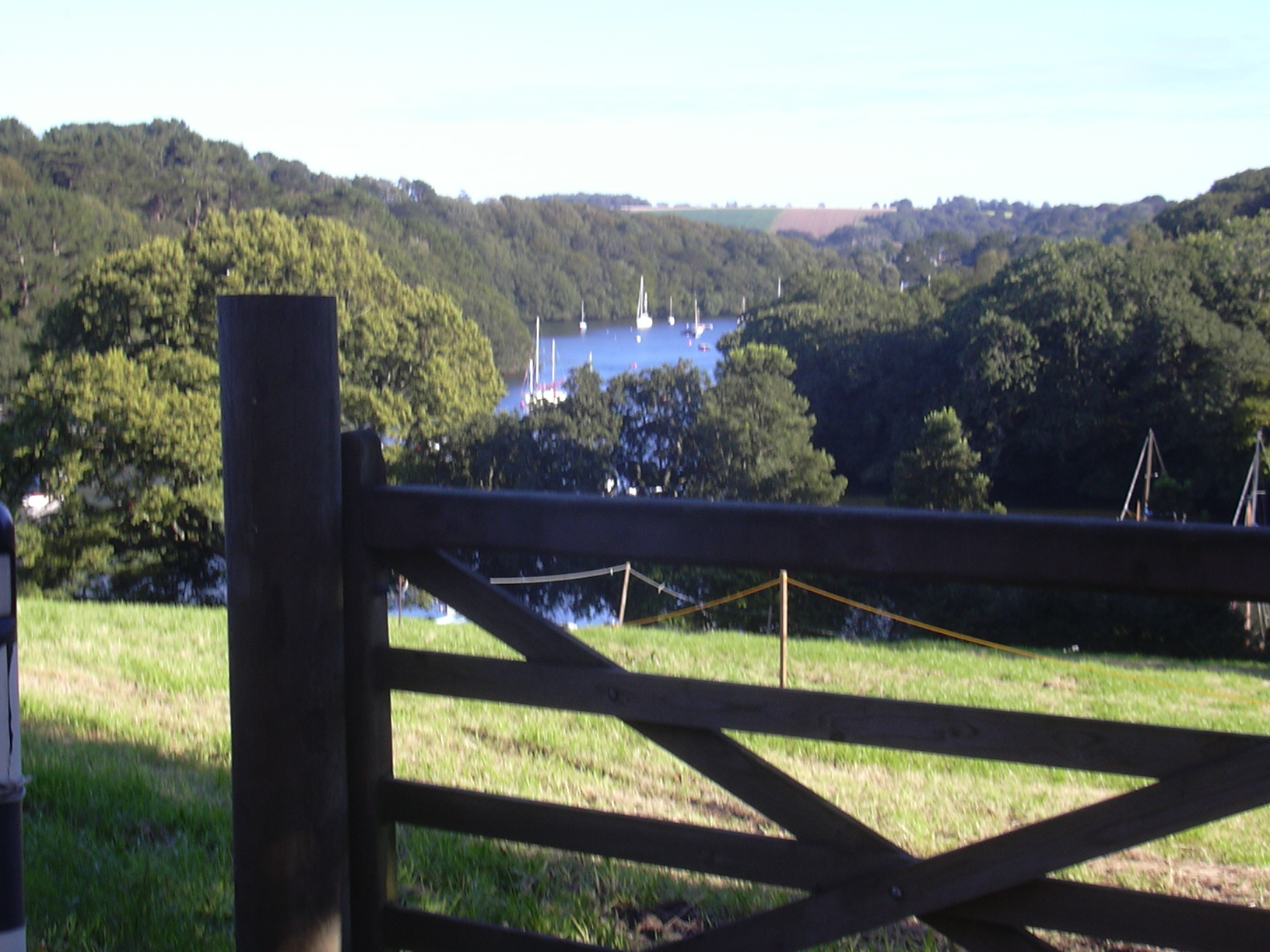
Port Navas Creek, Helford River, Cornwall

Porth Navas (Cornish: Porth an Navas) is a small village in Cornwall, England, UK. The village was called "Cove" until the 19th century development as a granite port and is at the head of a short creek running off the main limb which runs north from the Helford River. It is between Mawnan Smith and Constantine within the civil parish of Constantine.

== History ==
From medieval times until the 19th century the creek functioned as an access to the sea for neighbouring farms, whose boundaries all extended to the water at this point. With the local abundance of good quality granite, it was developed as a port to export the building material in the 19th century . The name Port Navas came into general use at this time. A track was built along the North bank of the creek with a retaining wall, and a quay with cranes was constructed for wharfs alongside. This opened for trade in 1830, and was later supplemented by a second quay further down the creek, offering deeper water. In its heyday, it bustled as a commercial port. Significant London projects included granite for Tower Bridge. Cheaper granite from Norway, coupled with the emergence of concrete led to its decline. Coasting vessels continued to transport coal and chalk until the 1930s. Other industries included oyster farming, which has taken place since 1829.

== Culture and community ==
Burgee of Port Navas Yacht Club, established in 1958

It is now mainly a residential and leisure area, with moorings for small craft, and pontoons at a club sited on the upper quay. The creek dries at low tide. A Methodist Chapel has recently been converted into a private house. There is a village hall that has been reinstated to its community role, and has regular activities. Porth Navas's popularity depends on its beauty as part of the Helford River, and the present return of the lower quay for commercial use in connection with the oyster fishery has aroused controversy.

Porth Navas lies within the Cornwall Area of Outstanding Natural Beauty (AONB).

== Notable residents ==
- Michael Foster, talent agent and political candidate.
