= Portington, East Riding of Yorkshire =

Hamlet in the East Riding of Yorkshire, England

Coordinates: 53°46′09″N 0°48′20″W

Portington
- Location within the East Riding of Yorkshire
- OS grid reference: SE787309
- Civil parish: Eastrington
- Unitary authority: East Riding of Yorkshire
- Ceremonial county: East Riding of Yorkshire
- Region: Yorkshire and the Humber
- Country: England
- Sovereign state: United Kingdom
- Post town: GOOLE
- Postcode district: DN14
- Dialling code: 01430
- Police: Humberside
- Fire: Humberside
- Ambulance: Yorkshire
- UK Parliament: Goole and Pocklington

Portington is a hamlet in the East Riding of Yorkshire, England, approximately 3 miles (5 km) east of Howden. It lies 0.5 miles (0.8 km) east of the A614 road.

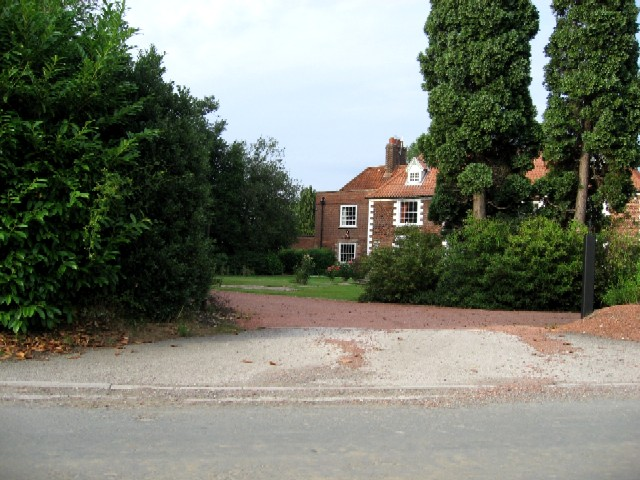
Portington Hall

It forms part of the civil parish of Eastrington. Portington lies within the Parliamentary constituency of Goole and Pocklington.

Portington Hall is a Grade II listed building.

The name Portington derives from the Old English Portingtūn, meaning either 'settlement connected to a market town', referring to Howden, or 'settlement connected to Porta'.
