= Officialese =

Language that sounds official

Officialese, bureaucratese, or governmentese is language that sounds official. It is the "language of officialdom". Officialese is characterized by a preference for wordy, long sentences; complex words, code words, or buzzwords over simple, traditional ones; vagueness over directness; and passive over active voice (some of those elements may, however, vary between different times and languages). The history of officialese can be traced to the history of officialdom, as far back as the eldest human civilizations and their surviving official writings.

Officialese is meant to impress the listener (or reader) and increase the authority (more than the social status) of the user, making them appear more professional. Ernest Gowers noted that officialese also allows the user to remain vague. It can be used to make oneself understood to insiders while being hard to decipher by those unfamiliar with the jargon and subtexts used. Its use is known to put off members of the general public and reduce their interest in the material presented. Officialese has been criticized as making one's speech or prose "stilted, convoluted, and sometimes even indecipherable"; or simply as the "cancer of language". It is thus more pejoratively classified as one of the types of gobbledygook. Its use can also result in unintended humorous incidents, and has been often satirized.

Several similar concepts to officialese exist, including genteelism, commercialese, academese, and journalese. The existence of officialese has been recognized by a number of organizations, which have made attempts to curtail its use in favour of plain language.

== See also ==
- Bureaucracy
- Business speak
- Fedspeak
- Legalese
- Manual of style
- Humphrey Appleby – a fictional character noted for his extremes in officialese
- Wooden language
