= Public rhetoric =

Public rhetoric refers to discourse both within a group of people and between groups, often centering on the process by which individual or group discourse seeks membership in the larger public discourse. Public rhetoric can also involve rhetoric being used within the general populace to foster social change and encourage agency on behalf of the participants of public rhetoric. The collective discourse between rhetoricians and the general populace is one representation of public rhetoric. A new discussion within the field of public rhetoric is digital space because the growing digital realm complicates the idea of private and public, as well as previously concrete definitions of discourse. Furthermore, scholars of public rhetoric often employ the language of tourism to examine how identity is negotiated between individuals and groups and how this negotiation impacts individuals and groups on a variety of levels, ranging from the local to the global.

== Public rhetoric participants ==
A public, not to be confused with the public, is composed of members that address each other, are addressed as a group, and also subscribe to specific ideals. Michael Warner describes a public as "being self-organized, …a relationship among strangers …[where] merely paying attention can be enough to make [one] a member." Robert Asen notes that identity formation of members of a public "entails mutual recognition among members of diverse cultures." To Warner, publics are a social space where information is exchanged and is required for the exchange of information.

=== Counterpublics ===
Within the public sphere, dominant publics exist whose discourse can subordinate other publics or exclude them from a related discourse. Counterpublics are the result of discourse and/or people feeling marginalized, ignored, inadequately voiced, or silenced within the public sphere. "Counterpublic refers to those publics that form through mutual recognition of exclusions in wider publics, set themselves against exclusionary wider publics, and resolve to overcome these exclusions," writes Asen. Where dominant public groups typically manufacture heteronormative public spaces and discourse, counterpublics seek to insert or reinsert voices and perspectives of and from publics. Discourse then abnormalizes or even challenges dominant public rhetoric. Warner describes the facilities of counterpublic using the LGBTQ+ community:

Within a gay or queer counterpublic, for example, no one is in the closet: the presumptive heterosexuality that constitutes the closet for individuals in ordinary speech is suspended. But this circulatory space, freed from heteronormative speech protocols, is itself marked by that very suspension: speech that addresses any participant as queer will circulate up to a point, at which it is certain to meet intense resistance. It might therefore circulate in special, protected venues, in limited publications. The individual struggle with stigma is transposed, as it were, to the conflict between modes of publicness. The expansive nature of public address will seek to keep moving that frontier for a queer public, to seek more and more places to circulate where people will recognize themselves in its address; but no one is likely to be unaware of the risk and conflict involved.

As Asen furthers, "Individuals do not necessarily recognize exclusions and resolve to overcome them by virtue of their location in a social order." Asen maintains that claiming a counterpublic of this form can diminish counterpublic forms to particular contributors who share specific interests with other members but might not consider each other as allies.

=== Subaltern and bourgeois groups ===
Amid publics and counterpublics, prevailing ideology, discourse, and images can create a hierarchy of group members and the rhetoric thereof. The struggle for political and social power within the public sphere between publics gives rise to dominant and weaker internal publics within a public, namely subaltern and bourgeois publics, respectively. For example, in their article "Graffiti Hurts in the United States," Terri Moreau and Derek H. Alderman describe an anti-graffiti task force, Graffiti Hurts, advocating for the eradication of urban graffiti in public spaces. This organization funded mural projects that would serve as a deterrent for would-be graffitists. While graffiti is often considered a lesser art form compared to the classical arts such as music, canvas painting, and sculpture, the mural projects "actually work to carry out a 'normative' prescription of landscape. The normalization has the ability to eradicate the potential for alternative constructions of public expression. As [Kurt] Iveson observes, 'A legal mural might have some effect in making ... people's culture more visible in public space, but often this is on someone else's' terms.'" Keith Haring argues that the dominant images of a gay counterpublic produce "clones" representing "well-built," effeminate, white males. While whiteness is idealized, racial minority imagery and representation was and remains marginalized.

A bourgeois subgroup within a public is primarily composed of "private individuals…[that] do not 'rule'.... Instead, their ideas infiltrated the very principle on which the existing power is based." The bourgeois within a public represent a prevailing definition of the relevant publics and thereby control a greater degree of shared space for the related discourse between the larger public membership.

=== Strangers ===
Strangers are those who are not aware of their membership within a particular public. They are capable of being members of a public; however, they can also hold no opinion or in other ways pay no attention to their potential membership to a public. Strangers are normally not those who ignore their membership (which implies one is aware of being a member of a public). To Warner, without the presence of strangers in a public sphere, public discourse cannot occur because it is a requirement for public discourse to address strangers and provide them the awareness to identify themselves as an addressed public.

=== Orientation ===
Public rhetoric participants produce discourse relative to a larger conglomerate of people or publics. Within the public sphere, different publics engage their own or other publics in conversation creating discourse that affects their own and other groups through definition of public boundaries, redefining public structure, and dispersing related public ideology. For a person to produce public rhetoric, one would self-identify with a public. Media, culture, and geography are the more predominant orienting processes that channel people towards and away from specific publics. Through public rhetoric, publics can recruit strangers and embed or polarize members of the same or other publics. Political propaganda and product advertisement are two concrete examples of forces that orient strangers and publics through analog and digital media. When people engage in public discourse, "describ[ing] themselves and others, they do not engage in a value-neutral and transparent process. Rather, representational processes implicate participants in (often unacknowledged) choices regarding how people should be portrayed". As one begins to form judgments regarding the image of a public, of a particular ideology, or of the protocols governing inclusion and exclusion in public discourse, that person then gains membership within a relevant public, thus becoming, in part, a representation of the whole image of said public.

How one is introduced to a public varies as existing knowledge and experience can augment how one perceives a public and public rhetoric. Tony Hiss points out how places can orient and disorient civilians. In his discussion, Hiss describes public parks as having the function of "changing the way we look at things, diffusing our attention and also relaxing its intensity…". The geography of the park often contrasts the image of the city in which it exists. Effective entrance design for parks encourage visitors to enter, displacing prior experience in exchange for "park experience", in a transition that navigates the visitors smoothly to and from the park experience. Similarly, when strangers are introduced to public discourse, orientation processes enable strangers to adopt and displace specific images of a public and evoke their membership to the new public.

== Rhetoric for public use ==
According to David J. Coogan and John M. Ackerman, "rhetoric is in the midst of discovering anew its usefulness." As service learning and civic engagement increase at colleges and universities, rhetoric begins the process of regrouping and becoming relevant in the community outside of the academy. In both the field of English and of communication, rhetoric's reputation needs to be repaired and adapted to meet the needs of the general populace. In general, the public view of rhetoric is a negative one. It is the talk of politicians—filled with lies and manipulation. Instead, the public work of rhetoric should try to lead to social change. Scholars such as Ellen Cushman and Cynthia Sheard demonstrate this belief in their work; these and other scholars believe that rhetoricians should use their tools for the good of the public. In order to make this shift in rhetoric's reputation, rhetoric needs a new set of guidelines by which to prepare rhetoricians to participate in social action.

=== Rhetoric in praxis as social action ===
Because rhetoric and composition are so closely related, the composition classroom becomes an open space for fostering social activism through service learning and allowing students to develop a sense of agency for both their scholarship and their interactions with the public. Ellen Cushman tells readers in her article "The Rhetorician as an Agent of Social Change" that "one way to increase our participation in public discourse is to bridge the university and community through activism. Given the role rhetoricians have historically played in the politics of their communities, [Cushman believes] modern rhetoric and composition scholars can be agents of social change outside the university." Through their respective institutions, Cushman argues that both young and old scholars of rhetoric and composition can use their educational expertise to connect with the public outside of the university that, as scholars, they are typically estranged from. Because universities are often situated as counterpublics within the overall public of the geographic area in which they are located, it appears that scholars often feel prohibited from approaching and participating in the outside community. In order to negate this feeling of being restricted from community engagement, Cushman urges members of the rhetoric and composition community at universities to participate in service learning.

=== Reciprocity from practicing rhetoric in public spaces ===
In an attempt to bridge the gap between the university and the community, Cushman suggests ways to "empower people in our communities, establish networks of reciprocity with them, and create solidarity with them." In order to invent this network of reciprocity, Cushman urges rhetoricians and students within the university to venture outside of the boundaries of the institution, foster relationships with members of the community, and to perform work that benefits the community. Hopefully the scholar perceives a kairotic moment in which they come to an understanding of the relationship between the community and public rhetoric and are then, in turn, able to write and publish on their work. In essence, "[Cushman is] asking for a deeper consideration of the civic purpose of our positions in the academy, of what we do with our knowledge, for whom, and by what means." Aside from the reciprocity that inherently comes from performing social activism within the general community, engaging with those outside of academe allows scholars to improve the public's general conception of rhetoric, thereby increasing the field's ethos in the eyes of the general public.

=== Reforming the public's view of rhetoric ===
While the general populace currently views "doing rhetoric" as "menacing our fellow citizens with lies and misdirection," these devices have the ability to allow rhetoricians and social activists alike to bring about social change and repair rhetoric's reputation in the eyes of the general populace. For example, in Cynthia Sheard's article, "The Public Value of Epideictic Rhetoric," she discusses how epideictic rhetoric, which has traditionally elicited a negative public opinion, can be used to foster social change. Sheard calls rhetoricians to embrace a process of "[r]econceptualizing epideictic in order to emphasize ... [i]ts close connection to the public sphere and its visionary quality ... " Sheard continues to explain that "epideictic discourse alters the reality in which it participates by making its vision a reality for its audience and instilling a belief that the power for realizing the vision lies with them." According to Sheard, this ability to alter the audience's perception of reality, an ability that epideictic rhetoric was once criticized for, is exactly what gives this device the power to involve the general populace in social activism and persuade them to view rhetoric in a positive light instead of describing it as a manipulative device.

== Spaces ==
Spaces are the sites in which public rhetoric happens. These sites are not necessarily physical, geographically bound places, but metaphysical spaces in which discourse is shared and mediated by the members of specific publics.

=== Places vs. spaces ===
To understand the spaces in which public rhetoric is enacted, it is important to understand the differences between "space" and "place." In his book The Practice of Everyday Life, Michel de Certeau, defines places as an "instantaneous configuration of positions." To Certeau, places are geographically bound, locatable sites. These sites are defined by location and spatial relations to other places.

Certeau claims that places are different from spaces because places are "ultimately reducible to being there" while spaces are specified "by the actions of historical subjects." While places could be pointed to on a map and are defined by what is physically inside of them, spaces are sites where things have happened. A space is defined by the interactions that individual agents have with it, not by its physical features. Certeau gives the examples that the place of a street becomes a space only when people walk on it and the places of texts only become spaces when people read them. When people engage in a discourse with a place, when they participate in public rhetoric there, it becomes a space.

=== Utopias and heterotopias ===
Michel Foucault built on Certeau's definition of space in his essay, "Of Other Spaces: Utopias and Heterotopias," pointing out that spaces were defined by "a set of relations that delineates sites which are irreducible to one another and absolutely not superimposable on one another." He argued that these individual, specific spaces could be placed in two main types: utopias and heterotopias.

==== Utopias ====
According to Foucault, utopias are spaces with no real place which present society in its perfected form. Since these spaces are not places that exist in reality, but rather as a result of the rhetoric that surrounds them, they are described as fundamentally unreal places.

==== Heterotopias ====
Heterotopias are real spaces that exist in every culture. Unlike Utopias, they are places that exist in physical space and can be indicated by their location. Foucault describes these heterotopias as "effectively enacted utopias in which the real sites, all the other real sites that can be found within the culture, are simultaneously represented, contested, and inverted." These heterotopic spaces transcend a single place as their value comes from the interactions that take place inside of them, but the fact that they are universally constructed and recognized allows for them to be pointed to geographically.

==== Middle spaces ====
Middle-spaces, according to David Coogan, are spaces in which rhetors from different publics can come and have an engaging discourse. As Coogan discusses, these are both physical and ideological places in which agents from two given publics c[an] come together to engage in discourse about "the 'codes' to evaluate conduct, entertain political possibilities, and in other ways arrange their affairs." These spaces are especially conducive as places for counterpublics and publics to meet to question the commonplaces or ideological statements. In enacting discourse in middle spaces, counterpublic discourse can be heard and have influence on public discourse.

== Tourism as public rhetoric ==
In discussions of public rhetoric, tourism refers both to the act of traveling to a physical location in search of a transformative experience and to the metaphorical action of traveling into the experiential world of another. Public rhetoric scholars use the language of tourism to examine individuals and communities' relationships to each other.

=== Identity politics ===
Scholars of public rhetoric frequently invoke the language of tourism to discuss individual and group identity. This is often done to disrupt notions of individuality. Jürgen Habermas, for instance, chronicles the emergence of the concept of the individual in Western society, only to demonstrate the individual's sublimation before the regulating function of the public sphere: "With the interweaving of the public and private realm, not only do the political authorities assume certain functions in the sphere of commodity exchange and social labor, but conversely social powers now assume political functions. This leads to a kind of 'refeudalization' of the public sphere." Habermas' concern for the political and social ramifications of individual versus public identity is one shared by other public rhetoric scholars.

=== Toxic tourism ===
Whereas the Western conception of the Subject tends to emphasize individual autonomy, scholars of public rhetoric challenge the notion that individual identity exists separately from the surrounding world. This challenge to Enlightenment notions of identity is exemplified by the work of Phaedra Pezzullo. In Toxic Tourism, Pezzullo argues that tourism as practice has the potential to help bridge the divide between Subject and Object by facilitating interaction on a multi-sensory level. Pezzullo suggests that embracing tourism's ability to engage all of the body's senses "may help those of us who study tourism to become more reflexive about our own culpability in privileging and, thus, perpetuating oppressive and colonial sensibilities." The language of interconnection and responsibility pervades public rhetoric's concern with tourism as a process that mediates relationships between human beings.

Researchers such as Pezzullo have discussed the large extent that notions of toxicity are reflected in the ways that certain groups are marginalized. For instance, Pezzullo writes "that the 'toxic baggage' the nation carries exceeds the material impact of toxins and public discourses about them. It includes our cultural perceptions of our bodies and the bodies of 'polluted' and 'polluting' Others." Thus, the language of toxicity is not limited to describing polluted areas or even victims of pollution. Toxicity is used to identify and rhetorically isolate segments of the population that do not conform to the Public's normative expectations. Yet, as Pezzullo also suggests, the practice of tourism allows for travel between the Public and those citizens and groups who stand outside it. Pezzullo suggests that toxic tours, for instance, stand to allow the marginalized and often ignored Other to "look back" at the tourist who is experiencing the toxic area. The experience of becoming the Object of the Other's gaze raises the possibility that the tourist's perspective on the Other may be altered in the exchange, thus raising the possibility that the practice of tourism can induce transformation in the tourist.

=== Tourism and publics ===
Taken in a broad sense, the practice of tourism enables interactions that allow for the formation and maintenance of publics. Tourism as a concept does not merely connote the movement of bodies from one physical place to another; it also refers to the internalization and externalization of ideas. As Michael Warner indicates, the ability to exchange ideas is what enables the participatory creation of the public sphere and is, therefore, a source of great power: "Speaking, writing, and thinking involve us-actively and immediately-in a public, and thus in the being of the sovereign. Imagine how powerless people would feel if their commonality and participation were simply defined by pre-given frameworks, by institutions and law, as in other social contexts it is defined through kinship. ... Such is the image of totalitarianism." Examined as an exchange of ideas, the practice of tourism allows individuals to engage in discourse with other individuals, thereby creating publics.

Key to Warner and other scholars' understanding of publics is the notion of voluntary participation. The citizen-tourist must willingly encounter the perspectives of other citizens. In this sense, public-creating tourist practices are not limited to "the pundits and wonks and reaction-shot secondary celebrities who try to perform our publicness for us ... [, but include] people whose place in public media is one of consuming, witnessing, griping, or gossiping rather than one of full participation, or fame." Warner goes on to state that, "a public can only produce a sense of belonging and activity if it is self-organized through discourse rather than through an external framework." Just as the tourist who travels to a different geographic area chooses to do so, a choice that invites the possibility of being transformed by the experience, the citizen-tourist must choose to engage in discourse with other citizens in order for that exchange to create and maintain a public.

== Birthplaces of public rhetoric: the street & the riot ==
In its most organic form, the discourse of the public sphere arises spontaneously. In his seminal work "The Public Sphere: An Encyclopedia Article" Habermas discusses the bourgeois public as an instrumental development in the history of publics but recognizes the limitations of the bourgeois public for modernity: "Although the liberal model of the public sphere is still instructive today with respect to the normative claim that information be accessible to the public, it cannot be applied to the actual conditions of an industrially advanced mass democracy…". The size of the modern state limits the ability of the democratic populace to truly engage in a conversation of public rhetoric. Thus, instead of self-regulating, many of the public's demands need to be met by the state, which could not please everyone on such a large scale. When these needs are not met, the scale of the democracy requires a dramatic catalyst to bridge the distance between the citizens and bring to light the need for change.

The most basic (albeit violent) form of public would be that of the riot, which is engendered by "competitions of interest, competitions which assume the form of violent conflicts." Although this public is less civilized and perfect than is desirable, the spontaneity and power of riots and civil unrest—which Habermas refers to as "the street"—often affect change, as has been demonstrated throughout modern history time and time again. Without any sort of organized formation, the riot embodies the public sphere; the citizenry reacts to an issue with an outburst of the same opinion (one they may not realize they shared) and has thus created a publicly driven rhetorical discourse surrounding the issue.

The riot is organic; often considered barbaric or savage because of the raw emotions involved. Cynthia Sheard claims that it is a result of "the ways in which words fail us… all-too-common images of violence must make us wonder, indeed, whether words can make any difference in our lives." Although the riot may have devastating consequences, it is purposeful in its ability to create recognition of a problem across a nation, bridging the gaps of class and distance the issue may otherwise find insurmountable. For example, the Black Lives Matter movement is now global due to the riots following the kairotic police shooting of Michael Brown in Ferguson, MO. Many of those who have never before been affected by police violence towards black males have now seen the movement "in their own backyards," and protests have arisen across the country, while both the mainstream and social media coverage of Ferguson has enabled this issue to be prescient in the minds of many far-removed citizens.

== Digital public ==
A digital public can be considered as a few different entities. According to Patricia G. Lange, a digital space is a social network, or a group of people related to each other in some way. Digital social networks in which knowledge is communicated and shared have been labeled "epistemopolis." An epistemopolis facilitates the growth of communities in a specific space around a specific topic. These digital social spaces are complicated by the possibility of anyone in the world being related to anyone else in the world in any given way at any given time; measurements or regulations or requirements for defining a specific digital space would need to be applied on an individual basis. While this isn't necessarily up for debate in fields that study digital realms, it does present challenges for public rhetoric because it provides a more complex, tangled conception of a public.

A digital space can take any of a variety of forms: chat rooms, social media networks, blogs, private journals, news sites, question and answer forums, professional marketing pages, online shopping sites, etc. Additionally, digital space allows for cultural interaction in a way that is not possible in analog device spaces. The internet is a social construction, designed for social interaction among various contexts (including economic, discursive, etc.). To this end, digital spaces can be manipulated, adapted, or even created for different, specific functions. Consider Wikipedia: "the free encyclopedia anyone can edit." This site encourages individuals to share more information, making verified knowledge public and collaborative. Another example is Douglas Eyman's text Digital Rhetoric: Theory, Method, Practice. Eyman wrote a print and a digital version of this text and includes a statement encouraging readers to take, revise, reuse, and circulate his original text, which is why he made the book available for free online.

=== Public rhetoric in the digital realm ===
The digital sphere presents a new set of challenges for public rhetoric. With issues of authorship, autonomy, and anonymity, the field crosses back and forth constantly between private and public. Individuals can create a digital persona, an avatar, while keeping their actual identity a secret. It is relatively easy to steal content and present it as your own (leading to copyright and plagiarism issues). To a certain extent, "technology has fused with human consciousness itself," resulting in a collective, shared, public memory. Many people may oppose or feel threatened by advancements in technology, especially the internet. Some question personal and financial safety, a fear that may be heard as part of the argument opposing use of digital spaces. Opportunities for extended communication, in a plethora of different ways, litter the argument for development of digital spaces and tools. For example, digital social activism (also referred to as internet activism or cyberactivism) is a growing movement that uses digital spaces to spread awareness and encourage action regarding various topics. Analog spaces tend to allow for a smaller audience than digital spaces, and therefore (typically) results in less action.

Digital rhetoric is important to consider when thinking about digital publics. Individuals create online identities, influencing how a digital audience can be addressed. This in turn influences how the author uses the rhetorical canons in their composition.

== The photographic image as an icon ==
Photographic images can function in public rhetoric as icons of U.S. public culture. According to Robert Hariman and John Louis Lucaites in No Caption Needed: Iconic Photographs, Public Culture, and Liberal Democracy, iconic images "work in several registers of ritual and response." Public interpretations and influences of iconic photographic images manifest themselves as visual representations, or delivery of rhetoric. How these images function in public depends on the features of the specific image, the motivation for the image, and the responses from the public sphere.

=== What makes an icon an icon? ===
While multiple interpretations of photographic images as icons are discussed in conversations of public rhetoric, establishing what makes an icon an icon is important in order to identify and further analyze icons' functions. Hariman and Lucaites describe the seven characteristics of an icon as follows:

1. is easily recognized by many people of varied backgrounds;
2. is an object of veneration and other complex emotional responses;
3. is reproduced widely and placed prominently in both public and private settings;
4. is used to orient the individual [viewer] within a context of collective identity, obligation, and power;
5. represents large swaths of historical experience and acquires its own history of appropriation and commentary;
6. stands above the welter of news, debates, decisions, and investigations; and/or
7. bears witness to something that exceeds words.

If a photographic image holds one or more of the above-mentioned characteristics, it is considered an icon and fulfills several important functions in public rhetoric.

=== Functions of photographic icons in public life ===
As a version of public rhetoric, iconic images serve to compose meaning and persuade a public audience to respond in some way. According to Hariman and Lucaites, "each image presents a pattern of motivation that can make some responses more likely than others." An iconic image semiotically promotes an interpretation by its audience that is by no means incumbent on the specific image, but likely will create a realm of similar meanings more frequently than others. Five vectors of influence are identified for iconic photographs: "reproducing ideology, communicating social knowledge, shaping collective memory, modeling citizenship, and providing figural resources for communicative action."

==== Reproducing ideology ====
Iconic images have the capability of representing ideology, which Hariman and Lucaites define as "a set of beliefs that presents a social order as if it were a natural order, that presents asymmetrical relationships as if they were mutually beneficial, and that makes authority appear self-evident." A photograph has the power to create such public meaning that can manipulate order, relationships, and authority as part of reproducing ideology.

==== Communicating social knowledge ====
Because icons are distinctively public visual images, they "recast social knowledge with regard to the distinctive concerns and roles of public life." By tapping into the knowledge of the public to which they are being presented, icons effectively persuade members of a society and their social interactions, as any successful rhetoric does. Photographs can communicate social knowledge because they are accepted as representations of social performance.

==== Shaping collective memory ====
Photographic icons can negotiate collective memory as part of the social knowledge it communicates. An icon can shape public understanding of specific events and contexts at the kairotic time of their occurrence and thereafter. Thus, society as a whole acts as the audience of the rhetorical message sent about the time the photograph was taken. Hariman and Lucaites contend, "the more collective memory is constructed through the visual media, the more likely it is that the iconic photos will be used to mark, frame, and otherwise set the tone for later generations' understanding of public life" in the specific time period.

==== Modeling citizenship ====
Members of the public interpreting iconic images can themselves be shaped by the messages sent by the icons, as can their rhizomatic relationships with each other. When viewing icons that portray U.S. citizens, the audience sees themselves in those citizens and emulates their portrayal of society. Iconic images essentially "display the public to themselves."

==== Providing figural resources for communicative action ====
Since society can be considered "abstract" in terms of relationships between citizens, photographs serve to communicate such ambiguous citizenship and supply models for how to be a "good citizen." Hariman and Lucaites explain that "an iconic photograph can continue to shape public understanding and action long after the event has passed or the crisis has been resolved pragmatically." The collective memory formed by iconic photographs inspire action to perform as a moral citizen and motivate public response.

== Sources ==
- Asen, Robert (2002). "Imagining in the Public Sphere". Philosophy & Rhetoric. 35 (4): 345–367. doi:10.1353/par.2003.0006. ISSN 1527-2079. S2CID 145400330.
- Barron, Nancy; Gruber, Sibylle (2011). "Responsible Knowledge Workers: Rhetoric, Media, and the Third Environment". The International Journal of Technology, Knowledge, and Society. 7 (2): 153–166. doi:10.18848/1832-3669/cgp/v07i02/56202. ISSN 1832-3669.
- Brooke, Collin Gifford (2009). Lingua fracta: toward a rhetoric of new media. Hampton Press. ISBN 978-1-57273-892-8.
- de Certeau, Michel (1984). The practice of everyday life. University of California Press. ISBN 978-0-520-23699-8.
- Coogan, David J. (2010). "Sophists for Social Change". The Public Work of Rhetoric. University of South Carolina Press. pp. 157–174. doi:10.2307/j.ctv6wghr9.15. ISBN 978-1-61117-304-8. JSTOR j.ctv6wghr9.
- Hauser, Gerard A. (2010). "Introduction: The Space to Work in Public Life". In Coogan, David J.; Ackerman, John M. (eds.). The Public Work of Rhetoric. University of South Carolina Press. pp. 1–16. doi:10.2307/j.ctv6wghr9.7. ISBN 978-1-61117-304-8. JSTOR j.ctv6wghr9.
- Cushman, Ellen (1996). "The Rhetorician as an Agent of Social Change". College Composition and Communication. 47 (1): 7–28. doi:10.2307/358271. ISSN 0010-096X. JSTOR 358271.
- Eyman, Douglas (2015). Digital Rhetoric. doi:10.3998/dh.13030181.0001.001. ISBN 978-0-472-07268-2.
- Foucault, Michel (1986). "Of Other Spaces" (PDF). Diacritics. 16 (1). Translated by Miskowiec, Jay: 22–27. doi:10.2307/464648. JSTOR 464648.
  - Foucault, Michel (2004). "Des espaces autres". Empan (in French). 54 (2): 12. doi:10.3917/empa.054.0012. ISSN 1152-3336.
- Habermas, Jurgen (1974). "The Public Sphere: An Encyclopedia Article (1964)" (PDF). New German Critique (3): 49–55. doi:10.2307/487737. ISSN 0094-033X. JSTOR 487737.
- Hariman, Robert; Lucaites, John Louis (2007). No Caption Needed: Iconic Photographs, Public Culture, and Liberal Democracy. University of Chicago Press. ISBN 978-0-226-31606-2..
- Haring, S. (2007). "Keith Haring and Queer Xerography". Public Culture. 19 (2): 329–348. doi:10.1215/08992363-2006-039. ISSN 0899-2363.
- Hiss, Tony (1991). The Experience of Place. Vintage Books. ISBN 978-0-679-73594-6.
- Iveson, Kurt (2007). Publics and the City. Wiley. ISBN 978-1-4051-2730-1.
- Lange, Patricia G. (2007). "Publicly Private and Privately Public: Social Networking on YouTube". Journal of Computer-Mediated Communication. 13 (1): 361–380. doi:10.1111/j.1083-6101.2007.00400.x.
- McCaughey, Martha; Ayers, Michael D. (2003). Cyberactivism: Online Activism in Theory and Practice. Psychology Press. ISBN 978-0-415-94320-8.
- Moreau, Terri; Alderman, Derek H. (2010). "Graffiti Hurts and the Eradication of Alternative Landscape Expression". Geographical Review. 101 (1): 106–124. doi:10.1111/j.1931-0846.2011.00075.x. ISSN 0016-7428. S2CID 145803772.
- Ong, Walter J. (1980). "Reading, Technology, and the Nature of Man: An Interpretation". The Yearbook of English Studies. 10: 132–149. doi:10.2307/3506938. ISSN 0306-2473. JSTOR 3506938.
- Pezzullo, Phaedra C. (2007). Toxic Tourism: Rhetorics of Pollution, Travel, and Environmental Justice. University of Alabama Press. ISBN 978-0-8173-1550-4.
- Poster, Mark (2004). "Consumption and digital commodities in the everyday". Cultural Studies. 18 (2–3): 409–423. doi:10.1080/0950238042000201581. ISSN 0950-2386. S2CID 145606684.
- Sheard, Cynthia Miecznikowski (1996). "The Public Value of Epideictic Rhetoric". College English. 58 (7): 765–794. doi:10.2307/378414. ISSN 0010-0994. JSTOR 378414.
- Silver, David (2005). "Selling cyberspace: Constructing and deconstructing the rhetoric of community". Southern Communication Journal. 70 (3): 187–199. doi:10.1080/10417940509373326. ISSN 1041-794X. S2CID 143818779.
- Warner, Michael (2002). "Publics and counterpublics (abbreviated version)" (PDF). Quarterly Journal of Speech. 88 (4): 413–425. doi:10.1080/00335630209384388. ISSN 0033-5630. S2CID 144976068.
