= Team room =

Team room may refer to:

- A part of a field house
- A locker room
- A type of office workspace
- An engineering military term
