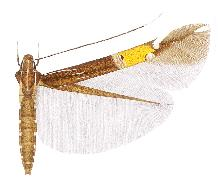

Scientific classification
- Kingdom: Animalia
- Phylum: Arthropoda
- Clade: Pancrustacea
- Class: Insecta
- Order: Lepidoptera
- Family: Cosmopterigidae
- Genus: Cosmopterix
- Species: C. helike

Binomial name
- Cosmopterix helike Koster, 2010

= Cosmopterix helike =

Species of moth

Cosmopterix helike is a moth of the family Cosmopterigidae. It is known from Goiás, Brazil.

Adults have been recorded in May.

== Description ==
Male. Forewing length 3.7 mm. Head: frons shining ochreous-grey with greenish and reddish and reflections, vertex and neck tufts shining dark bronze brown with greenish and reddish and gloss, laterally and medially lined white, collar shining dark brown with greenish and reddish and gloss; labial palpus first segment very short, white, second segment three-quarters of the length of third, dark brown with white longitudinal lines laterally and ventrally, third segment white, lined brown laterally; scape dorsally dark brown with a white anterior line, ventrally white, antenna shining dark brown, with a short white line at base changing into an interrupted line to two-thirds, followed towards apex by three dark brown segments, one white, three dark brown and fifteen white segments at apex. Thorax and tegulae shining dark brown with reddish gloss, thorax with a white median line, tegulae lined white inwardly. Legs: shining dark brown with reddish gloss, femora of midleg and hindleg shining ochreous-grey with golden gloss, foreleg with a white line on tibia and tarsal segments one to three and five, tibia of midleg with white oblique basal and medial lines and a white apical ring, tarsal segment one with a whitish lateral line on the outside and a white apical spot, segment two with a white apical spot and segment five entirely white, tibia of hindleg with a very oblique silvery white line at base, a less oblique silvery white medial streak and a white apical ring, tarsal segment one with a silvery white basal streak on dorsum and an ochreous-grey apical ring, segments two to four with ochreous-grey apical rings, segment five entirely white, spurs ochreous-white dorsally, dark brown ventrally. Forewing shining dark brown with reddish gloss, four narrow white lines the basal area, a subcostal from base to one-quarter, bending from costa in distal third, a short medial above fold, its centre under the tip of the subcostal, a subdorsal similar to the medial, but slightly further from base, a short and very narrow dorsal from beyond base to one-fifth, a yellow transverse fascia beyond the middle, mixed greyish, narrowed towards dorsum, bordered at the inner edge by a tubercular silver metallic fascia with greenish and reddish reflections, bordered at the outer edge by two tubercular silver metallic costal and dorsal spots, the dorsal spot more than three times as large as the costal and more towards base, a small subcostal patch of blackish brown scales subcostally on the outside of the fascia, the costal and dorsal spots irregularly lined dark brown on the inside, a white costal streak from the costal spot, the apical line reduced to a few white scales in the middle of the apical area, followed by a shining white spot in the cilia at apex, cilia dark brown, paler towards dorsum. Hindwing shining dark greyish brown with greenish and reddish gloss, cilia brown. Underside: forewing shining dark brown, the white costal streak and the white spot at apex distinctly visible, hindwing shining dark greyish brown. Abdomen dorsally shining dark brown with greenish and reddish reflections, laterally dark brown, ventrally shining ochreous with segments banded shining white posteriorly, anal tuft brown.

== Etymology ==
The species is named after Helike, a moon of Jupiter. To be treated as a noun in apposition.
