= Working family =

Australian political term

Working family was a term used by Kevin Rudd, former Prime Minister of Australia, and members of his leadership team, during the lead-up to the 2007 Australian federal election.

== Prior use ==
The term is similar to the glittering generality "Hardworking families" used heavily by the political parties in the campaign of the 2005 United Kingdom general election and more generally in the politics of the United Kingdom and of the United States.

== Australian federal election, 2007 ==
The term was used 16 times by Rudd during the leaders debate on 21 October 2007. Despite calls for a definition during the election campaign, the term remained undefined. The ambiguous nature of the term allowed evasion of definitive policies throughout the campaign.

In the lead up to the federal budget of May 2008 the term continued to cause confusion and the scope was expanded by the Treasurer and the Prime Minister to include, among others, "a single person who is a pensioner or a self-funded retiree, or someone who is being provided care by a carer". In fact neither the prime minister or the treasurer was prepared to exclude anyone from the definition.

== Definition ==
On 1 May 2008, the Treasurer of Australia, Wayne Swan (Australian Labor Party), described 'working family' on the Australian Broadcasting Corporation radio program, Radio National Breakfast, as follows:

"When you're talking about "working families", who exactly are you talking about?" (Interviewer: Steve Cannane)

"I'm talking about those people on modest incomes. If you're talking about Sydney, you're talking about a principal income earner who might be earning $50–60 thousand a year, and a secondary income earner, who will be working part-time, and could pull in anywhere between 20 or 30 thousand dollars per year. These are people who work very hard, they are hit by rising inflation, which is why tackling inflation in this Budget is so important, they are hit by the rising cost of living, and until recent times they have been hit by a rising proportion of taxation...."

This definition was reinforced by Rudd later the same day, saying, "If you’re a working family on $50,000 a year, it means, or a worker on $50,000 a year...."

== 2008 Federal Budget ==
In the Federal Budget's second reading speech, presented to the Parliament of Australia on 13 May 2008, the term "Working family/ies" was used thirteen times.

Commentary after the budget reflected on the various levels of household income at which the budget's measures cut out (or in):

- A$100,000
  - Medicare levy (single person) – above which people must pay for private health coverage
  - Solar power rebate (household income) – above which the rebate is not available
  - Baby Bonus threshold – above which the Bonus is not paid
- A$150,000
  - Medicare levy (couple)
