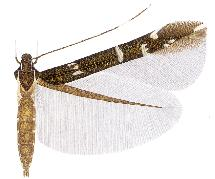

Scientific classification
- Kingdom: Animalia
- Phylum: Arthropoda
- Clade: Pancrustacea
- Class: Insecta
- Order: Lepidoptera
- Family: Cosmopterigidae
- Genus: Cosmopterix
- Species: C. io

Binomial name
- Cosmopterix io Koster, 2010

= Cosmopterix io =

Species of moth

Cosmopterix io is a moth of the family Cosmopterigidae. It is known from Ecuador and Tamaulipas, Mexico.

Adults have been recorded in June and July.

== Description ==
Male. Forewing length 3.3-3.9 mm. Head: frons shining pale golden metallic, vertex and neck tufts shining dark bronze brown with some reddish reflection, laterally lined white, collar shining dark bronze brown; labial palpus first segment very short, ochreous-grey, second segment two-thirds of the length of third, dark brown with white longitudinal lines laterally and ventrally, third segment white, lined dark brown laterally, extreme apex white; scape dorsally dark brown with a white anterior line, ventrally white, antenna shining dark brown with a white interrupted line from base to one-half with a short uninterrupted section at base, a subapical white section of seven segments, followed by a dark brown section of about twelve segments, apical three segments white. Thorax and tegulae shining dark bronze brown with reddish gloss, tegulae broadly lined pale golden metallic inwardly.

Legs: shining dark brown, tibiae foreleg and midleg ochreous-grey, tibia of hindleg shining brownish golden, foreleg with a white line on tibia and tarsal segments one and two, segment four with a white apical ring, segment five entirely white, tibia of midleg with silver metallic oblique basal and medial streaks with bluish gloss and a white apical ring, tarsal segment one with a white longitudinal line and apical ring, segment two and four with white apical rings, segment five entirely white, tibia of hindleg with a silver metallic basal streak and medial and subapical rings, all with bluish gloss, the apical ring white, tarsal segments one to three with white apical rings, segments four and five entirely white, spurs dark brown, distally lighter. Forewing shining dark brown with reddish gloss, at one-fifth three short silver metallic streaks with bluish reflection in a row, a subcostal, a medial just above fold and half the length of the subcostal and a subdorsal, about as long as the subcostal but slightly further from base, a narrow tubercular silver metallic medial fascia with greenish and purplish reflections in the middle, perpendicular at dorsum, at two-thirds a tubercular silver metallic dorsal spot with bluish reflection, on costa at three-quarters, a tubercular pale golden costal spot, smaller than the dorsal spot and edged by a narrow white costal streak, apical line as two silver metallic spots with bluish reflection in the middle of the apical area and a broad white spot in the cilia at apex, cilia dark brown, paler on dorsum towards base. Hindwing shining dark greyish brown, cilia dark brown.

Underside: forewing shining dark greyish brown with the white costal streak and apical spot distinctly visible, hindwing greyish brown. Abdomen dorsally shining ochreous-brown with golden gloss, ventrally shining dark greyish brown, segments broadly banded shining white posteriorly, anal tuft shining greyish-brown.

== Etymology ==
The species is named after Io, a moon of Jupiter. To be treated as a noun in apposition.
