= Academese =

Jargon used in academia

Academese is the unnecessary use of jargon in academia, particularly in academic writing in social science and humanities; it is contrasted with plain language. The term is often but not always pejorative, and occasionally can be used to refer to complex but necessary terminology. Critics of academese argue that it usually creates unnecessary difficulty in communication, with the harshest critics arguing this is intentional with writers aiming to impress the readers and hide the fact that they are not saying anything of substance.

== Related concepts ==
In the context of medical sciences, a similar term, medicalese, exists; likewise, legal science jargon is called legalese. In the context of the English language, the term Engfish has also been used ("sounds like English but stinks like a fish"). Another related and highly pejorative term is academic bullshit.

== History, examples of usage and criticism ==
The usage of the word in English has been traced to at least 1917, and is attributed to Will Durant, who in his Philosophy and the Social Problem defined it as an opposite of "plain language". Academic writing, particularly in the fields of art and literary criticism, was the subject of criticism by George Orwell in his 1946 essay Politics and the English Language; similar criticisms were expressed by Steven Pinker in his 2014 essay, entitled Why Academics Stink at Writing. In 1985, Jacob L. Mey criticized academese harshly, writing that "Academese is a misuse of language, a road-block on the way to knowledge, erected by the mafia of the pseudo-scientists and their linguistic connection: it obstructs, rather than promotes communication. It discriminates against Academe's outsiders by ridiculing their ways of expressing themselves".

Academese has been partially attributed to the rise of the postmodernist tradition. Some of the related issues have been popularized by the Sokal affair in 1996. Alan Sokal produced a text that "not only exemplifies academese in what might be one of its worst – that is, most inaccessible – forms, but also unabashedly mocks anyone who uses it", published in a purported academic journal specializing in postmodernist texts, and then published a critique of this process in another journal.

Academese has been criticized through mock awards by several organizations. Since 1974 the National Council of Teachers of English has been awarding the "Doublespeak Award", an "ironic tribute to public speakers who have perpetuated language that is grossly deceptive, evasive, euphemistic, confusing, or self-centered". From 1995 to 1998 the journal Philosophy and Literature sponsored a 'Bad Writing Contest', which lampooned "the most stylistically lamentable passages found in scholarly books and articles published in the last few years", with philosopher Judith Butler, the winner of that contest in 1998, often cited as one of the most notorious users of academese.

Howard S. Becker, author of several guides on academic writing addressed to young scholars, has been described as having "an aversion to academese".

In 2012, Mark Blyth noted that in order to popularize scientific research, scholars need to "let go of the academese".

Academese has been criticized in syndicated comic strips, including a Calvin and Hobbes comic originally published in 1993 as well as a strip in Piled Higher and Deeper.

Academese has been described as a common stereotype of academic writing in general.

== Purpose and characteristics ==
Academese has been criticized for being overly complex and for being intentionally complex to impress readers. Academese can also constitute a form of power relations between those who use it and those who do not, serving to separate individuals into different groups and discriminate against those who are not fluent in it. Conversely, academese can help academics recognize one another quickly and help them socialize with one another.

While the term is often seen as pejorative, it can be sometimes used in neutral fashion as a synonym to academic writing, or jargon in that field, some of which is considered necessary to express certain advanced concepts.

== See also ==
- Corporate jargon
- Ethnofiction
- Journalese
- Officialese
- Wooden language
