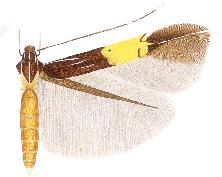

Scientific classification
- Kingdom: Animalia
- Phylum: Arthropoda
- Clade: Pancrustacea
- Class: Insecta
- Order: Lepidoptera
- Family: Cosmopterigidae
- Genus: Cosmopterix
- Species: C. thelxinoe

Binomial name
- Cosmopterix thelxinoe Koster, 2010

= Cosmopterix thelxinoe =

Species of moth

Cosmopterix thelxinoe is a moth of the family Cosmopterigidae. It is known from Brazil (Federal District) and the United States (North Carolina).

Adults have been recorded in March and April.

== Description ==
Male, female. Forewing length 3.5 mm. Head: frons shining greyish white with greenish and reddish reflections, vertex and neck tufts dark brown with reddish gloss, laterally and medially lined white, collar dark brown; labial palpus first segment very short, white, second segment three-quarters of the length of third, brown with white longitudinal lines laterally and ventrally, third segment white, lined brown laterally; scape dorsally dark brown with a white anterior line, white ventrally, antenna shining dark brown, a white line from base to one-sixth, changing into an interrupted line to beyond one-half, followed towards apex by a white-lined section of approximately five segments, five dark brown, four white, two dark brown, two white, ten dark brown and seven white segments at apex. Thorax and tegulae dark brown with reddish gloss, thorax with a white median line, tegulae lined white inwardly. Legs: greyish brown with reddish gloss, femora of midleg and hindleg shining pale greyish ochreous, foreleg with a white line on tibia and tarsal segments one to three and five, tibia of midleg with white oblique basal and medial lines and a white apical ring, tarsal segments one, two and four with white apical rings, segment five entirely white, tibia of hindleg as midleg but with an additional broad greyish white subapical ring, tarsal segments one to three with white apical rings, segments four and five entirely white, spurs whitish, inner spurs greyish at base. Forewing dark brown with reddish gloss, four white lines in the basal area, a subcostal from base to one-quarter, slightly bending from costa distally, a short and straight medial above fold from one-fifth to one-third, a similar subdorsal below fold, slightly further from base than the medial, an indistinct dorsal from beyond base to one-fifth, a broad yellow transverse fascia beyond the middle with a small apical protrusion, bordered at the inner edge by two united pale golden metallic tubercular spots, forming a fascia not reaching the costa, edged by a small patch of blackish brown scales subcostally on the outside, bordered at the outer edge by two similarly coloured costal and dorsal spots, the dorsal spot three times as large as the costal and slightly more towards base, both spots inwardly lined dark brown, a white costal streak from the outer costal spot, a shining white apical line from beyond the apical protrusion, cilia dark brown around apex, paler towards dorsum. Hindwing shining dark brownish grey, cilia brown. Underside: forewing shining greyish brown, the white costal streak indistinctly and the white apical line in the cilia at apex distinctly visible, hindwing shining brownish grey. Abdomen dorsally yellowish brown, segments banded greyish brown posteriorly, ventrally shining yellowish white, anal tuft yellowish white.

== Etymology ==
The species is named after Thelxinoe, a moon of Jupiter. To be treated as a noun in apposition.
