= Pezzullo =

Pezzullo is an Italian surname. Notable people with the surname include:

- Lawrence Pezzullo (1926–2017), American diplomat and Foreign Service officer
- Mike Pezzullo (born 1964/65), Australian public servant
- Phaedra Pezzullo (born 1974), American author and scholar
- Pretzel Pezzullo (1910–1990), American baseball player
