= Weasel word =

Words or phrases using vague claims to appear meaningful

In rhetoric, a weasel word, or anonymous authority, is a word or phrase aimed at creating an impression that something specific and meaningful has been said, when in fact only a vague, ambiguous, or irrelevant claim has been communicated. The terms may be considered informal. Examples include the phrases "some people say", "it is thought", and "researchers believe". Using weasel words may allow one to later deny (a.k.a., "weasel out of") any specific meaning if the statement is challenged, because the statement was never specific in the first place. Weasel words can be a form of tergiversation and may be used in conspiracy theories, advertising, popular science, opinion pieces and political statements to mislead or disguise a biased view or unsubstantiated claim.

Weasel words can also be used to weaken or understate a controversial claim in order to provide a hedge against negative feedback. An example of this is using terms like "somewhat" or "in most respects", which make a sentence more ambiguous than it would be without them.

== Origin ==
The expression weasel word may have derived from the egg-eating habits of weasels. A 1999 article in Buffalo News attributes the origin of the term to William Shakespeare's plays Henry V and As You Like It, which include similes of weasels sucking eggs. The article claims these similes are flawed because weasels have insufficient jaw musculature to be able to suck eggs.

Ovid's Metamorphoses provides an earlier source for the same etymology. Ovid describes how Juno orders the goddess of childbirth, Lucina, to prevent Alcmene from giving birth to Hercules. Alcmene's servant Galanthis, realizing that Lucina is outside the room using magic to prevent the birth, emerges to announce that the birth has been a success. Lucina, in her amazement, drops the spells of binding, and Hercules is born. Galanthis then mocks Lucina, who responds by transforming her into a weasel. Ovid writes (in A. S. Kline's translation) "And because her lying mouth helped in childbirth, she gives birth through her mouth..." Ancient Greeks believed that weasels conceived through their ears and gave birth through their mouths.

Definitions of the word 'weasel' that imply deception and irresponsibility include: the noun form, referring to a sneaky, untrustworthy, or insincere person; the verb form, meaning to manipulate shiftily; and the phrase "to weasel out", meaning "to squeeze one's way out of something" or "to evade responsibility".

Theodore Roosevelt attributed the term to his friend William Sewall's older brother, Dave, claiming that he had used the term in a private conversation in 1879. The expression first appeared in print in Stewart Chaplin's short story "Stained Glass Political Platform" (published in 1900 in The Century Magazine), in which weasel words were described as "words that suck the life out of the words next to them, just as a weasel sucks the egg and leaves the shell." Roosevelt apparently later put the term into public use after using it in a speech in St. Louis on May 31, 1916. According to Mario Pei, Roosevelt said, "When a weasel sucks an egg, the meat is sucked out of the egg; and if you use a weasel word after another, there is nothing left of the other."

== Forms ==
A 2009 study of Wikipedia found that most weasel words in it could be divided into three main categories:

1. Numerically vague expressions (for example, "most", "some people", "experts", "many", "evidence suggests")
2. Use of the passive voice to avoid specifying an authority (for example, "it is said")
3. Adverbs that weaken (for example, "often", "probably")

Other forms of weasel words may include these:

- Illogical or irrelevant statements
- Use of vague or ambiguous euphemisms
- Use of grammatical devices such as qualifiers, negation and the subjunctive mood
- In most languages with one, use of the first person plural pronouns e.g. we, us, our, and ours
- Glittering or vague generalizations

Generalizing by means of quantifiers, such as many, when quantifiable measures could be provided, obfuscates the point being made, and if done deliberately is an example of "weaseling."

Illogical or irrelevant statements are often used in advertising, where the statement describes a beneficial feature of a product or service being advertised. An example is the endorsement of products by celebrities, regardless of whether they have any expertise relating to the product. In non-sequitur fashion, it does not follow that the endorsement provides any guarantee of quality or suitability.

False authority is defined as the use of the passive voice without specifying an actor or agent. For example, saying "it has been decided" without stating by whom, and citation of unidentified "studies" or "publications" by "authorities" or "experts," provide further scope for weaseling. It can be used in combination with the reverse approach of discrediting a contrary viewpoint by glossing it as "claimed" or "alleged." This embraces what is termed a "semantic cop-out," represented by the term allegedly. This implies an absence of ownership of opinion, which casts a limited doubt on the opinion being articulated. The construction "mistakes were made" enables the speaker to acknowledge error without identifying those responsible.

However, the passive voice is legitimately used when the identity of the actor or agent is irrelevant. For example, in the sentence "one hundred votes are required to pass the bill," there is no ambiguity, and the actors including the members of the voting community cannot practicably be named even if it were useful to do so.

The scientific journal article is another example of the legitimate use of the passive voice. For an experimental result to be useful, anyone who runs the experiment should get the same result. That is, the identity of the experimenter should be of low importance. Use of the passive voice focuses attention upon the actions, and not upon the actor—the author of the article. To achieve conciseness and clarity, however, most scientific journals encourage authors to use the active voice where appropriate, identifying themselves as "we" or even "I."

The middle voice can be used to create a misleading impression. For example:

- "It stands to reason that most people will be better off after the changes."
- "There are great fears that most people will be worse off after the changes."
- "Experience insists that most people will not be better off after the changes."

The first of these also demonstrates false authority, in that anyone who disagrees incurs the suspicion of being unreasonable merely by dissenting. Another example from international politics is use of the phrase "the international community" to imply a false unanimity.

Euphemism may be used to soften and potentially mislead the audience. For example, the dismissal of employees may be referred to as "rightsizing," "headcount reduction," and "downsizing." Jargon of this kind is used to describe things euphemistically.

Restricting information available to the audience is a technique sometimes used in advertisements. For example, stating that a product "... is now 20% cheaper!" raises the question, "Cheaper than what?" It might be said that "Four out of five people prefer ..." something, but this raises the questions of the size and selection of the sample, and the size of the majority. "Four out of five" could actually mean that there had been 8% for, 2% against, and 90% indifferent.

== See also ==
- Ambivalence
- Concept creep
- Corporate jargon
- Essentially contested concept
- Filler (linguistics)
- Fnord
- If-by-whiskey
- Linguistic relativity
- Newspeak
- Non-apology apology
- Non-denial denial
- Political correctness
- Spin (propaganda)
- Wooden language
- Hedge (linguistics)
