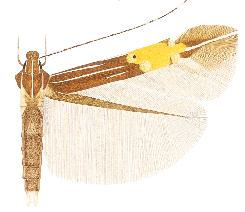

Scientific classification
- Kingdom: Animalia
- Phylum: Arthropoda
- Clade: Pancrustacea
- Class: Insecta
- Order: Lepidoptera
- Family: Cosmopterigidae
- Genus: Cosmopterix
- Species: C. orthosie

Binomial name
- Cosmopterix orthosie Koster, 2010

= Cosmopterix orthosie =

Species of moth

Cosmopterix orthosie is a moth of the family Cosmopterigidae. It is known from Minas Gerais, Brazil.

Adults have been recorded in April.

== Description ==
Male. Forewing length 4.1 mm. Head: frons shining pale ochreous with greenish and reddish reflections, vertex and neck tufts brown with reddish gloss, laterally and medially lined white, collar brown; labial palpus first segment very short, white, second segment four-fifths of the length of third, brown with white longitudinal lines laterally and ventrally, third segment white, lined dark brown laterally; scape dark brown with a white anterior line, white ventrally, antenna shining dark brown with a very short white line from base, changing into an interrupted line to three-fifths, very indistinct distally, followed towards apex by two white segments, two dark brown, two white, ten dark brown, four white and four dark brown segments at apex. Thorax and tegulae brown with reddish gloss, thorax with a white median line, tegulae lined white inwardly. Legs: greyish brown, femur of hindleg shining pale grey, foreleg with a white line on tibia and tarsal segments one and two, segment three white in basal half, segment five entirely white, tibia of midleg with white oblique basal and medial lines and a white apical ring, tarsal segments one and two with white dorsal streaks at apex, segment five entirely white, tibia of hindleg as midleg, tarsal segment one with white basal and apical rings, segments two to four with white dorsal streaks, segment five entirely white, spurs white, ventrally with a dark grey streak. Forewing brown with reddish gloss, five white lines in the basal area, a costal from one-third to the transverse fascia, a subcostal from base to one-third, slightly bending from costa, a straight medial above fold nearly from base almost to the transverse fascia, a subdorsal below fold, from one-third to the end of the medial, a dorsal from beyond base to the middle of the subdorsal, a broad yellow transverse fascia beyond the middle, narrowed towards dorsum and with an apical protrusion, bordered at the inner edge by two pale golden metallic tubercular subcostal and dorsal spots, the subcostal spot edged by a small patch of blackish brown scales on the outside, the dorsal spot slightly larger and further from base than the subcostal, bordered at outer edge by two similarly coloured costal and dorsal spots, both spots opposite, the dorsal spot twice as large as the costal, both brownish edged inwardly, a broad white costal streak from the outer costal spot and a similar streak from the outer dorsal spot into the cilia, a broad shining white apical line from the apical protrusion, cilia brown around apex, ochreous-grey towards dorsum. Hindwing shining dark brownish grey, cilia ochreous-grey. Underside: forewing shining greyish brown, the white apical line distinctly visible, hindwing shining pale grey, a short white streak at apex. Abdomen dorsally shining brown, ventrally lighter, segments banded shining yellowish white posteriorly, anal tuft whitish.

== Etymology ==
The species is named after Orthosie, a moon of Jupiter. To be treated as a noun in apposition.
