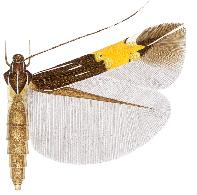

Scientific classification
- Kingdom: Animalia
- Phylum: Arthropoda
- Clade: Pancrustacea
- Class: Insecta
- Order: Lepidoptera
- Family: Cosmopterigidae
- Genus: Cosmopterix
- Species: C. mneme

Binomial name
- Cosmopterix mneme Koster, 2010

= Cosmopterix mneme =

Species of moth

Cosmopterix mneme is a moth of the family Cosmopterigidae. It is known from Bahia, Brazil.

Adults have been recorded in January.

== Description ==
Female. Forewing length 3.5 mm. Head: frons shining ochreous-white with greenish and reddish reflections, vertex and neck tufts dark brown with reddish gloss, medially and laterally lined white, collar dark brown; labial palpus first segment very short, white, second segment four-fifths of the length of third, brown with white longitudinal lines laterally and ventrally, third segment white, lined brown laterally; scape dark brown with a white anterior line, white ventrally, antenna shining dark brown with a white line from base to one-fifth, changing into an interrupted line to one-half, followed towards apex by a dark brown section of approximately eight segments, three white, two dark brown, two white, ten dark brown and eight white segments at apex. Thorax and tegulae dark brown with reddish gloss, thorax with a white median line, tegulae lined white inwardly. Legs: greyish brown, femora of midleg and hindleg shining pale grey, foreleg with a white line on tibia and tarsal segments, tibia of midleg with white oblique basal and medial lines and a white apical ring, tarsal segments one and two with white apical dorsal spots, segment five entirely white, tibia of hindleg as midleg, first tarsal segment with ochreous-white basal and apical rings, segments two to four with ochreous-white apical rings, segment five entirely ochreous-white, spurs white, ventrally with a dark grey streak. Forewing dark brown with reddish gloss, four white lines in the basal area, a subcostal from base to one-third, slightly bending from costa, a short and straight medial above fold from one-quarter to two-fifths, a subdorsal below fold, similar in length to the medial, but slightly further from base, a dorsal from beyond base to the middle of the subdorsal, a broad yellow transverse fascia beyond the middle with an apical protrusion, bordered at the inner edge by two golden metallic tubercular subcostal and subdorsal spots, the subcostal spot edged by a small patch of blackish brown scales on the outside, the subdorsal spot more towards apex than the subcostal, bordered at the outer edge by two similarly coloured costal and dorsal spots, the dorsal spot twice as large as the costal, both brownish edged on the inside, a broad white costal streak from the outer costal spot, a shining white apical line from just beyond the apical protrusion to apex, cilia dark brown around apex, brownish grey towards dorsum. Hindwing shining dark brownish grey, cilia brownish grey. Underside: forewing shining dark greyish brown, the white apical line distinctly visible, hindwing shining brownish grey. Abdomen dorsally shining brown with some reddish gloss, ventrally grey, segments banded shining yellowish white posteriorly, anal tuft greyish brown.

== Etymology ==
The species is named after Mneme, a moon of Jupiter. To be treated as a noun in apposition.
