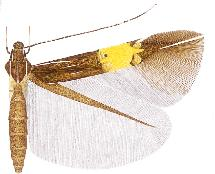

Scientific classification
- Kingdom: Animalia
- Phylum: Arthropoda
- Clade: Pancrustacea
- Class: Insecta
- Order: Lepidoptera
- Family: Cosmopterigidae
- Genus: Cosmopterix
- Species: C. iocaste

Binomial name
- Cosmopterix iocaste Koster, 2010

= Cosmopterix iocaste =

Species of moth

Cosmopterix iocaste is a moth of the family Cosmopterigidae. It is known from the Federal District of Brazil.

Adults have been recorded in February.

== Description ==
Male. Forewing length 3.5 mm. Head: frons shining pale brown with greenish and reddish and reflections, vertex and neck tufts brown with reddish gloss, medially and laterally lined white, collar brown; labial palpus first segment very short, pale brown, second segment three-quarters of the length of third, brown with white longitudinal lines laterally and ventrally, third segment white, lined brown laterally; scape dark brown with a white anterior line, white ventrally, antenna shining dark brown, a white line from base to two-thirds, in middle interrupted, followed towards apex by three dark brown segments, three white, two dark brown, two white, ten dark brown, eight white and one brown segment at apex. Thorax and tegulae brown with reddish gloss, thorax with a white median line, tegulae lined white inwardly. Legs: dark brown with reddish gloss, femur of midleg shining pale ochreous-grey, femur of hindleg shining pale ochreous, foreleg with a white line on tibia and tarsal segments, tibia of midleg with white oblique basal and medial lines and a white apical ring, tarsal segment one with a white lateral line from base on the outside and connected to an apical white dorsal spot, segment two and three dorsally white, segment five entirely white, tibia of hindleg as midleg, tarsal segment one with white basal and apical rings, segment two with a white apical ring, segments three and four white dorsally, segment five entirely white, spurs white, ventrally ochreous-grey. Forewing brown with golden gloss, three white lines in the basal area, a subcostal from base to one-quarter, slightly bending from costa, a short and straight medial above fold in the middle of the basal area, a slightly shorter subdorsal below fold, slightly further from base than the medial, sometimes a few white scales on the costa just before the transverse fascia and on dorsum beyond base, a yellow transverse fascia beyond the middle with a small apical protrusion, bordered at the inner edge by two pale golden metallic tubercular subcostal and dorsal spots, the subcostal spot edged by a small patch of blackish brown scales on the outside, the dorsal spot slightly further from base than the subcostal, bordered at the outer edge by two similarly coloured costal and dorsal spots, the dorsal spot twice as large as the costal, all spots with greenish and purplish reflections, a white costal streak from the outer costal spot, a shining white, bluish tinged, apical line from the distal half of the apical area to apex, cilia brown around apex, paler towards dorsum. Hindwing shining greyish brown, cilia brownish. Underside: forewing shining brown, the white apical line distinctly visible in the apical cilia, hindwing shining greyish brown in costal half, grey in dorsal half. Abdomen dorsally brown, ventrally dark greyish brown, in the middle shining yellowish white, segments broadly banded shining yellowish white posteriorly, anal tuft yellowish white.

== Etymology ==
The species is named after Iocaste, a moon of Jupiter. To be treated as a noun in apposition.
