= Ideograph (rhetoric) =

Type of word in political discourse

An ideograph or virtue word is a word frequently used in political discourse that uses an abstract concept to develop support for political positions. Such words are usually terms that do not have a clear definition but are used to give the impression of a clear meaning. An ideograph in rhetoric often exists as a building block or simply one term or short phrase that summarizes the orientation or attitude of an ideology. Such examples notably include <liberty>, <freedom>, <democracy> and <rights>. Rhetorical critics use chevrons or angle brackets (<>) to mark off ideographs.

The term ideograph was coined by rhetorical scholar and critic Michael Calvin McGee (1980) describing the use of particular words and phrases as political language in a way that captures (as well as creates or reinforces) particular ideological positions. McGee sees the ideograph as a way of understanding of how specific, concrete instances of political discourse relate to the more abstract idea of political ideology. Robertson defines ideographs as "political slogans or labels that encapsulate ideology in political discourse." Meanwhile, Celeste Condit and John Lucaites, influenced by McGee, explain, "Ideographs represent in condensed form the normative, collective commitments of the members of a public, and they typically appear in public argumentation as the necessary motivations or justifications for action performed in the name of the public." Ideographs are common in advertising and political discourse.

== Definition ==
McGee uses the term in his seminal article "The 'Ideograph': A Link Between Rhetoric and Ideology" which appeared in the Quarterly Journal of Speech in 1980. He begins his essay by defining the practice of ideology as practice of political language in specific contexts—actual discursive acts by individual speakers and writers. The question this raises is how does this practice of ideology create social control.

McGee's answer to this is to say that "political language which manifests ideology seems characterized by slogans, a vocabulary of 'ideographs' easily mistaken for the technical terminology of political philosophy." He goes on to offer his definition of "ideograph": "an ideograph is an ordinary-language term found in political discourse. It is a high order abstraction representing commitment to a particular but equivocal and ill-defined normative goal."

An ideograph, then, is not just any particular word or phrase used in political discourse, but one of a particular subset of terms that are often invoked in political discourse but which does not have a clear, univocal definition. Despite this, in their use, ideographs are often invoked precisely to give the sense of a clearly understood and shared meaning. This potency makes them the primary tools for shaping public decisions. It is in this role as the vocabulary for public values and decision-making that they are linked to ideology.

== Examples ==
There is no absolute litmus test for what terms are or are not ideographs. Rather, this is a judgment that must be made through the study of specific examples of discourse. However, McGee (and others who have followed him) have identified several examples of ideographs or virtue words in Western liberal political discourse, such as <liberty>, <property>, <freedom of speech>, <religion>, and <equality>. In each case, the term does not have a specific referent. Rather, each term refers to an abstraction which may have many different meanings depending on its context. It is in their mutability between circumstances that give the terms such rhetorical power. If the definition of a term such as <equality> can be stretched to include a particular act or condition, then public support for that act or condition is likely to be stronger than it was previously.

By encapsulating values which are perceived to be widely shared by the community, but which are in fact highly abstract and defined in very different ways by individuals, ideographs provide a potent persuasive tool for the political speaker. McGee offers the example of Richard Nixon's attempt to defend his decision not to turn over documents to Congress during the Watergate scandal by invoking "the principle of confidentiality." Recognizing that his refusal to submit to Congress could be seen as a violation of the "rule of law", Nixon pitted "the principle of confidentiality" against the "rule of law," despite the fact that these two ideographs would, in the abstract, not likely be seen as in conflict with one another. Nixon, in an attempt to expand the understanding of "the principle of confidentiality" to cover his own specific refusal to cooperate with Congress, used the abstractness of the term to his benefit, claiming that right to confidentiality was the more central term.

While the term has remained mostly in this sphere of academic rhetorical criticism, some political consultants and practitioners are becoming savvy to this art.

Ideographs appear in advertising and political campaigns regularly, and are crucial to helping the public understand what is really being asked of them. For example, "equality" is a term commonly used in political discourse and rarely defined. It can refer to a situation in which all people have the same opportunities, or a condition in which social resources are distributed uniformly to different individuals and groups. The former is the more commonly used definition in US history, according to Condit & Lucaites, although in a socialist or left-leaning political state, the term may refer foremost to the distribution of social resources. Condit and Lucaites depict the racial facet of equality as the dominant meaning in an American context of political discourse, since 1865.

Another important ideograph used specifically by U.S. presidents Barack Obama and George W. Bush after the 9/11 attacks is <terrorism>. The term does not have a clear or specific definition, but when applied to the context in the fear-stricken country after the devastating attacks in 2001, this term held significant weight and meaning to Americans all across the country. Kelly Long explores Obama's discourse on the <war on terror> and states that "by developing an ideological justification for the conflicts that the United States was involved in at the time, Obama remedied much of the damage done by the Bush administration". Obama justified the <war on terror> by addressing the nation and saying that in order to protect the <rule of law> and <democratic values>, we must fight against <terrorism>. Obama used this term to his advantage and made <terrorism> appear to be a common enemy and fighting back was the common cause. This use of the ideograph unified the country creating a sense of identity for American citizens, "defining what the nation stands for and against. The term divides those who are civilized from those who are uncivilized, those who defend economic freedom from those who would attack America’s way of life and those who support democracy from those who would disrupt it".

Marouf Hasian discusses how key ideographs representative of a society's commitments change over time, particularly in the name of <liberty>, <equality>, or <privacy> epitomized in eugenics. From the 1900s-1930s, Americans justified the restriction of reproductive rights based on medical, social, economic, and political considerations, but were appalled when the Nazis used some of the same arguments in their creation of the "perfect race".

While rhetorical critics identify these terms as ideographs, political leaders viewed each other's terms as "glittering generalities," as Lincoln first identified his opponent's words.

In addition to practitioners, corporate marketing and political consulting use key terms in this way, concentrating on the image and branding of terms. For example, Frank Luntz tests audience reaction to certain words or phrases using dial technology, a mechanism which instantaneously shows moment by moment reactions to speeches or presentations. This research has been extremely beneficial to his clients, as they can use ideographs as "trigger words" in an advertising campaign.

== Importance ==
There are three primary ways in which the concept of the ideograph is important to rhetorical critics. First, it suggests a way of studying political ideology using concrete instances of language use. By showing how looking at specific uses of key words and phrases in political language reveal underlying ideological commitments, McGee offers a concrete method for understanding the highly abstract concept of ideology.

Second, the definition of the ideograph makes clear that the rhetorical study of a term is different from a legal, historical, or etymological study of a term. Unlike other perspectives that focus on how a term has changed over time, a rhetorical study of a term focuses on the forces involved in the creation of these meanings. In short, a rhetorical study of a term is the study of the use of that term in practice.

This leads to a third key aspect of what the concept of the ideograph offers to rhetorical critics. McGee notes that the study of a term must not, and should not, be limited to its use in "formal discourse." Instead, the critic is much more likely to gain a better understanding of an ideograph by looking at how it is used and depicted in movies, plays, and songs, as well as how it is presented in educational texts aimed at children. This moves the study of ideology beyond the limits of social philosophy or even political discourse as traditionally conceived (i.e., "great speeches by great men").

== Cultural variability ==
"An ideograph is a culturally biased, abstract word or phrase drawn from ordinary language, which serves a constitutional value for a historically situated collectivity."

There exists a culturally-specific understanding in each culture about what an ideograph means. Ideographs in rhetoric are culturally specific but recur inter-culturally; meaning the understanding of one ideograph can be used and interpreted differently across cultures. The idea may be different from culture to culture, but this doesn't mean some aspects won't be the same in one or more cultures. For example, the concept of femininity that exists cross-culturally to define ideas about women, yet one can expect these ideas to vary from culture to culture.

== Critical use ==
At the end of his essay defining the ideograph, McGee says that

“A complete description of an ideology . . . will consist of (1) the isolation of a society’s ideographs, (2) the exposure and analysis of the diachronic structure of every ideography, and (3) characterization of synchronic relationships among all the ideographs in a particular context.”

Such an exhaustive study of any ideology has yet to materialize, but many scholars have made use of the ideograph as a tool of understanding both specific rhetorical situations as well as a broader scope of ideological history. As a teacher, McGee himself made use of the ideograph as a tool for structuring the study of the rise of liberalism in British public address, focusing on ideographs such as <property>, <patriarchy>, <religion>, <liberty>. Other scholars have made a study of specific uses of ideographs such as <family values> and <equality>. Some critics have gone beyond the idea that an ideograph must be a verbal symbol and have expanded the notion to include photographs. and objects represented in mass media.

== See also ==
- Essentially contested concept
- Loaded language
- Propaganda
