= Michael Calvin McGee =

American rhetorical theorist (1943–2002)

Michael Calvin McGee (October 21, 1943 – October 27, 2002) was an American rhetorical theorist, writer and social critic.

== Early life and education ==
McGee was born on October 21, 1943, in Rockwood, Tennessee, to John Vester and Dorothy Eloise McGee (née Hicks). Je spent his early years in Knoxville, Tennessee. He graduated with a B.A. in Speech from Butler University, where he was a champion debater. In 1967, he graduated with an M.A. in Rhetoric from Cornell University. In 1973 he married Lyda Eugenia Twitty. In 1974, he received his Ph.D. from the University of Iowa, writing his dissertation "Edmund Burke's Beautiful Lie: An Exploration of the Relationship between Rhetoric and Social Theory" under Donald C. Bryant. He received some criticism for his teaching because of his staunch liberalism, which affected his teaching style, but despite this, he was still a very sought-after professor, teaching at major universities in the United States such as the University of Alabama, the University of Memphis, and the University of Wisconsin–Madison. He is known for his materialistic views of rhetoric, summarized from the lesser-known McGee essay "The Practical Identity of Thought and Its Expression". In 1979, he moved to Iowa City, where he settled in at the University of Iowa.

== Career ==
McGee had many major contributions in the realm of rhetoric and cultural studies. He published three major works: Rhetoric in Postmodern America, The Ideograph: A Link between Rhetoric and Ideology, and Text, Context, and the Fragmentation of Contemporary Culture. The most important of these is considered to be his second major work, The Ideograph. McGee was the first rhetorical theorist to propose this concept on an ideograph, which he described as, "an ordinary-language term found in political discourse. It is a high-order abstraction representing a commitment to a particular but equivocal and ill-defined normative goal." Also he was a critic of what he saw going on in the world around him. The most well-known of these critiques was his critique of Spike Lee and his association with Nike ads. McGee said that these ads were too racially stereotypical and made a case for Lee to cease these ads but Lee continued with them nonetheless.

McGee died on October 27, 2002, in Iowa City, Iowa, aged 59.
