= Hardworking families =

Example of a glittering generality in contemporary political discourse

The phrase "hardworking families" or "working families" is an example of a glittering generality in contemporary political discourse. It is used in the politics of the United Kingdom and of the United States, and was heavily used by the political parties in the campaign of the 2005 United Kingdom general election and the 2007 Australian federal election where the Rudd Labor Party used the term extensively.

== Origins ==
Gordon Brown expressed gratitude to Bob Shrum for suggesting the phrase between 1994 and 1997.

== Quotations ==
Some examples of politicians using (or being reported as using) the phrase:

- "She [Lady Mallalieu] said the protesters wanted to show it was ‘hardworking families’ which would be hit by a hunting ban."
- "Turning to tax allowances, the married couples' allowance has been abolished, which is a strange move for a government who profess to support the family. They have abolished the MIRAS tax relief which has hit home-buyers. The change to the allowances for couples with children--the new children's tax credit--which is tapered away for higher rate taxpayers, will affect hardworking families on middle incomes."
- "Sometimes hard working families need a little help"
- "A Conservative government will give hope to hardworking families – decent people who respect others, who take responsibility for their children and who contribute to their local communities."
- "Then, it was mortgage rates at 15 per cent for a whole year with 1.5 million households suffering negative equity and over 250,000 families losing their homes—now, hardworking families are enjoying the lowest mortgage rates for 40 years. Then, it was 400,000 more on hospital waiting lists—now, it is almost 300,000 off. Then, it was crime doubled—now, it’s crime down by over a quarter."
- "WASHINGTON VERSUS HARD-WORKING AMERICAN FAMILIES"

Sometimes the use of the phrase by politicians is echoed in media reports on political events, or indeed the news medium itself employs the phrase as part of its own editorializing, in the expectation that its readers will infer that it is referring to them:

- "Meanwhile, the aspirations of ordinary, hardworking families will be the focus of attention for Tories in Bournemouth this week, their last conference before the General Election."
- "It is equally certain that there will be something for hard-working families after Tony Blair and the Chancellor have made several public announcements about their commitment on this subject."
- 'Chancellor Gordon Brown says that Tuesday's budget was designed to reward "hardworking families". What a sickening insult to the workers at Longbridge and the dependent factories who face devastation. ... These "hardworking families" now face the dole.'
- In satire: 'I got to do some great Soundbites. My favourites were: "hard working families", "providing opportunity and security", "breaking down barriers" and "on the firm foundations we have laid down since 1997 our programme will embed a new progressive consensus in our country". Who couldn't help but be stirred by the Passion of such sentiments?'
- In a letter to the editor: 'Sir: How right Andrew Schofield is (letter, 14 April) about the mantra "hard-working families". Having previously thought my working life fairly productive, I now discover that my single status proves me to have spent 25 years in total indolence. In fact, given that I've always worked in the public service and so can be dispensed with instantly with only benefit to the economy, I must always have been a freeloader of epic proportions. Given this, it would be hardly surprising if I could not be bothered to drag myself from my pit of sybaritic excess to a polling station.'

== See also ==
- Working Families Party
- Working Families for Wal-Mart
- Another equivalent in Australia is the Aussie battler.
- Refusal of work
- Working family, a term used during the lead-up to the Australian federal election, 2007
- Producerism
