= Buzzword =

Word or phrase used to impress

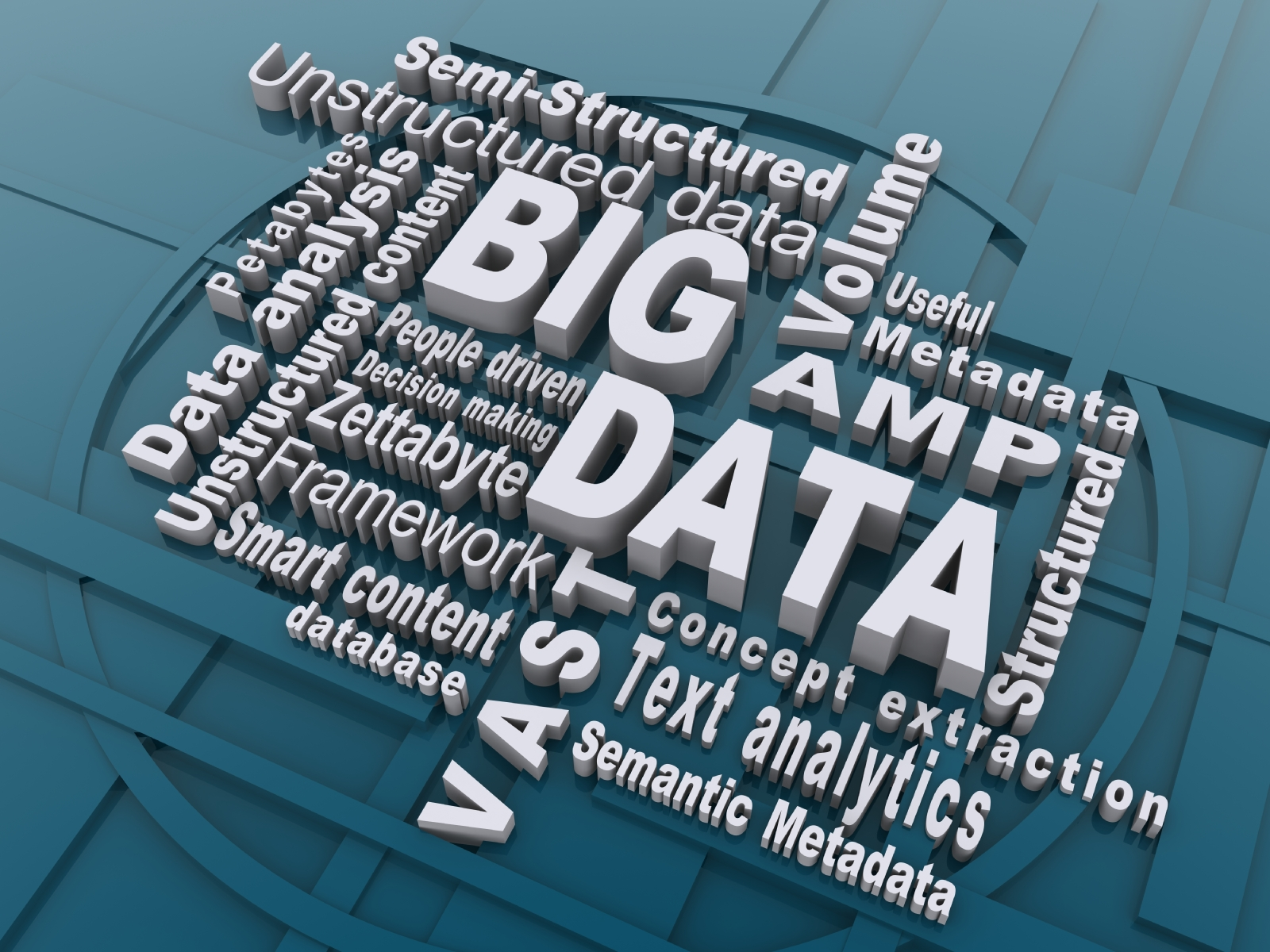
A word cloud of buzzwords related to big data

A buzzword is a word or phrase, new or already existing, that becomes popular for a period of time. Buzzwords often derive from technical terms yet often have much of the original technical meaning removed through fashionable use, being simply used to impress others. Some buzzwords retain their true technical meaning when used in the correct contexts; for example, artificial intelligence or big data. Buzzwords often originate in jargon, acronyms, or neologisms. Examples of overworked business buzzwords include synergy, vertical, dynamic, cyber and strategy.

It has been stated that businesses could not operate without buzzwords, as they are the shorthands or internal shortcuts that make perfect sense to people informed of the context. However, a useful buzzword can become co-opted into general popular speech and lose its usefulness. According to management professor Robert Kreitner, "Buzzwords are the literary equivalent of Gresham's law. They will drive out good ideas." Buzzwords, or buzz-phrases such as "all on the same page", can also be seen in business as a way to make people feel like there is a mutual understanding. As most workplaces use a specialized jargon, which could be argued is another form of buzzwords, it allows quicker communication. Indeed, many new hires feel more like "part of the team" the quicker they learn the buzzwords of their new workplace. Buzzwords permeate people's working lives so much that many do not realize that they are using them. The vice president of CSC Index, Rich DeVane, notes that buzzwords describe not only a trend, but also what can be considered a "ticket of entry" with regard to being considered as a successful organization – "What people find tiresome is each consulting firm's attempt to put a different spin on it. That's what gives bad information."

Buzzwords also feature prominently in politics, where they can result in a process which "privileges rhetoric over reality, producing policies that are 'operationalized' first and only 'conceptualized' at a later date". The resulting political speech is known for "eschewing reasoned debate (as characterized by the use of evidence and structured argument), instead employing language exclusively for the purposes of control and manipulation".

== Definition ==
The Concise Oxford English Dictionary defines a buzzword (hyphenating the term as buzz-word) as a slogan, or as a fashionable piece of jargon: a chic, fashionable, voguish, trendy word a la mode.

It has been asserted that buzzwords do not simply appear, they are created by a group of people working within a business as a means to generate hype. Buzzwords are most closely associated with management and have become the vocabulary that is known as "management speak": Using a pompous or magisterial term, of or relating to a particular subject employed to impress those outside of the field of expertise.

It could also be called buzz phrase or loaded word.

What this means is that when a manager uses a said buzzword, most other people do not hear the meaning, and instead just see it as a buzzword. However it has been said that buzzwords are almost a "necessary evil" of management, as a way to inspire their team, but also stroke their own egos. With that being said, a buzzword is not necessarily a bad thing, as many disciplines thrive with the introduction of new terms which can be called buzzwords. These can also cross over into pop culture and indeed even into everyday life. With media channels now operating through many media, such as television, radio, print and increasingly digital (especially with the rise of social media), a "buzzword" can catch on and rapidly be adapted through the world.

== Origin ==
The origin of buzzwords can be seen in Hallgren & Weiss (1946) as coming from business students studying at Harvard University as a way to help them gain better results from their studies. Such language terms were collated and then became what is known today as "buzzwords". During the early years of buzzwords, buzzwords were used by students as a means to enable them to quickly recall items of importance. As an example, "If his analysis does not highlight the most important problems he has 'poor focus', and if he fails to emphasize important recommendations he will be accused of 'tinkering'. If the sequence for the 'implementation' of the recommendations is not good it is a matter of 'poor timing'. To succeed, the student must 'get on top of the problem'. He must 'hit the problem' and not 'shadow box' it. If he cannot do these things he might just as well 'turn in his suit'".

Students have used many different buzzwords to describe the situation that they are in, and how this might affect a moment in their everyday life. From studying these business students, Hallgren & Weiss (1946) noticed that business students could speak with apparent authority. It also seemed as if using the right buzzword was more important than what the student came up with as an answer. Buzzwords have a strong influence on business culture and are commonly used in business speak.

== In popular culture ==
Jon Keegan of the Wall Street Journal has published a Business Buzzwords Generator, which allows readers to use a randomizer to assemble "meaningless business phrases using overused business buzzwords" – for example, "This product will incentivize big data and demonstrate innovative performance in the playing field."

Forbes hosts an annual "Jargon Madness" game, in which 32 of "corporate America's most insufferable expressions" are played off against each other in a bracketed, basketball-style tournament to determine the buzzword of the year.

LinkedIn publishes an annual list of buzzwords to avoid in creating résumés (British English: CVs) – "trite, empty words that may sound good to your ear but say almost nothing". The 2014 list: motivated, passionate, creative, driven, extensive experience, responsible, strategic, track record, organizational, and expert.

When people are approaching a meeting where they expect the presenters to use many buzzwords, they may prepare a game of buzzword bingo, where players score points each time a particular buzzword is used.

Patch Products has published a board game called Buzzword.

The "Weird Al" Yankovic album Mandatory Fun contains the song "Mission Statement", which is full of what he describes as the "ridiculous double-speak and meaningless buzzwords" in office environments.

== See also ==
- Ambiguity – Type of uncertainty of meaning where several interpretations are possible
- Buzzword bingo – Bingo-style word game
- Buzzword compliant
- Catchphrase – Phrase or expression recognized by its repeated utterance
- Corporate jargon, also known as marketing speak – Buzzwords and specialized vocabulary used by businesspeople
- Gartner hype cycle – Graphical presentation of the maturity of specific technologies
- Virtue word – Type of word in political discourse
- Law of the instrument, also known as Golden hammer – Over-reliance on a familiar tool
- Loaded language – Rhetoric used to influence an audience
- Marketing buzz – Interaction which amplifies marketing message
- Memetics – Study of self-replicating units of culture
- Newspeak – Fictional language in the novel "Nineteen Eighty-Four"
- Pleonasm – Redundancy in linguistic expression
- Psychobabble – Form of speech or writing that uses psychological jargon in a misleading way
- Weasel word – Words or phrases using vague claims to appear meaningful

== Sources ==
- Cluley, Robert (January 11, 2013). "What Makes a Management Buzzword Buzz?". Organization Studies. 34: 33–43. doi:10.1177/0170840612464750. S2CID 143649572.
- Collins, David (2000). Management Fads and Buzzwords: Critical-Practical Perspectives. Psychology Press.
- Hallgren, F. M.; Weiss, H. (1946). "'Buzz words' at the 'B School'". American Speech.
- Loughlin, Michael (May 2002). "On the buzzword approach to policy formation". Journal of Evaluation in Clinical Practice. 8 (2): 229–242. doi:10.1046/j.1365-2753.2002.00361.x. PMID 12180370.
