= Bus plunge story =

Filler story in print journalism

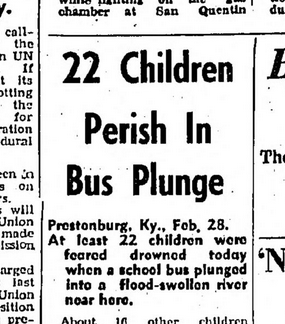
Report in The China Mail on a 1958 bus plunge in Prestonsburg, Kentucky

The term bus plunge is an idiom referencing a journalistic practice of reporting bus accidents in short articles that describe the vehicle as "plunging" from a bridge or hillside road. The phenomenon has been noted in The New York Times, which published many bus plunge stories from the 1950s through the 1980s, running about 20 such articles in 1968 alone.

Commentators on the "bus plunge" phenomenon have suggested that such reports were printed not because they were considered particularly newsworthy, but because they could be reduced to a few lines and used to fill gaps in the page layout. Further, the words "bus" and "plunge" are short and could be used in one-column headlines within the narrow eight-column format that was prevalent in newspapers through the first half of the 20th century.

Columnist John McIntyre has called the reports "phatic journalism" that pretends to inform the reader about world events without any significant news gathering. The development of computerized layout tools in the 1970s eventually reduced the need for such filler stories, but newswires continue to carry them.

== See also ==
- Filler (media)
- Journalese
