= Corporate jargon =

Buzzwords and specialized vocabulary used by businesspeople

Corporate jargon (Note: Variously known as corporate speak, corporate lingo, corpo lingo, business speak, business jargon, management speak, workplace jargon, corpospeak, corporatese, or commercialese.) is the jargon often used in large corporations, bureaucracies, and similar workplaces. The language register of the term is generally being presented in a negative light or disapprovingly. It is often considered to be needlessly obscure or, alternatively, used to disguise an absence of information. Its use in corporations and other large organisations has been widely noted in media.

Marketing speak is a related label for wording styles used to promote a product or service.

== Coinage and use ==
Corporate speak is associated with managers of large corporations, business management consultants, and occasionally government. Reference to such jargon is typically derogatory, implying the use of long, complicated, or obscure words; abbreviations; euphemisms; and acronyms. For that reason some of its forms may be considered as an argot. Some of these words may be neologisms or inventions, designed purely to fit the specialized meaning of a situation or even to "spin" negative situations as positive situations, for example in the practice of greenwashing. Although it is pervasive in the education field, its use has been criticized as reflecting a sinister view of students as commodities and schools as retail outlets.

== Criticism ==
The use of corporate jargon is criticised for its lack of clarity as well as for its tedium, making meaning and intention opaque and understanding difficult. It is also criticized for not only enabling delusional thoughts, but allowing them to be seen as an asset in the workplace. Corporate jargon has been criticized as "pompous" and "a tool for making things seem more impressive than they are". Steven Poole writes that it is "engineered to deflect blame, complicate simple ideas, obscure problems, and perpetuate power relations".

Marketing speak is a related label for wording styles used to promote a product or service to a wide audience by seeking to create the impression that the vendors of the service possess a high level of sophistication, skill, and technical knowledge. Such language is often used in marketing press releases, advertising copy, and prepared statements read by executives and politicians.

== Examples ==
Many corporate-jargon terms have straightforward meanings in other contexts (e.g., leverage in physics, or picked up with a well-defined meaning in finance), but are used more loosely in business speak. For example, a deliverable can become any service or product. The word team had specific meanings in agriculture and in sport before becoming a ubiquitous synonym for a group spanning one or more levels in a corporate organisation.

The phrases going forward or moving forward make a confident gesture towards the future, but are generally vague on timing, which usually means they can be removed from a sentence with little or no effect on its overall meaning.

In order to obfuscate or distract from unpleasant or unwanted news, filler such as the phrase "at this time" or overly complicated grammatical constructions – e.g. usage of the present progressive – is frequently used at the beginning of a sentence despite its clear redundancy. Examples include "At this time, we have decided we are not going to move forward with your application" when "We have decided not to move forward with your application" would suffice.

Legal terms such as Chapter 11 can be used: for example, Chapter 11, Title 11, United States Code is about US bankruptcy.

Some systems of corporate jargon recycle pop ethics with terms such as responsibility.

Corporate speak in non-English-speaking countries frequently contains borrowed English acronyms, words, and usages. Russian-speakers, for instance, may eschew native constructions and use words such as лидер (literally: lider for 'leader') or adopt forms such as пиарщик (piarshchik for 'PR specialist').

Jargon, like other manifestations of language, can change over time; and management fads may influence management-speak. This changing popularity over time can be seen in the English corpus used by Google Books Ngram Viewer.

== See also ==
- Academese
- Buzzword bingo
- Corporate communication
- Corporate identity
- Corporate propaganda
- Doublespeak
- Headlinese
- Journalese
- Legalese
- Military terminology
- Officialese
- Weasel word
