= Military terminology =

Euphemisms used by military personnel to refer to various operations

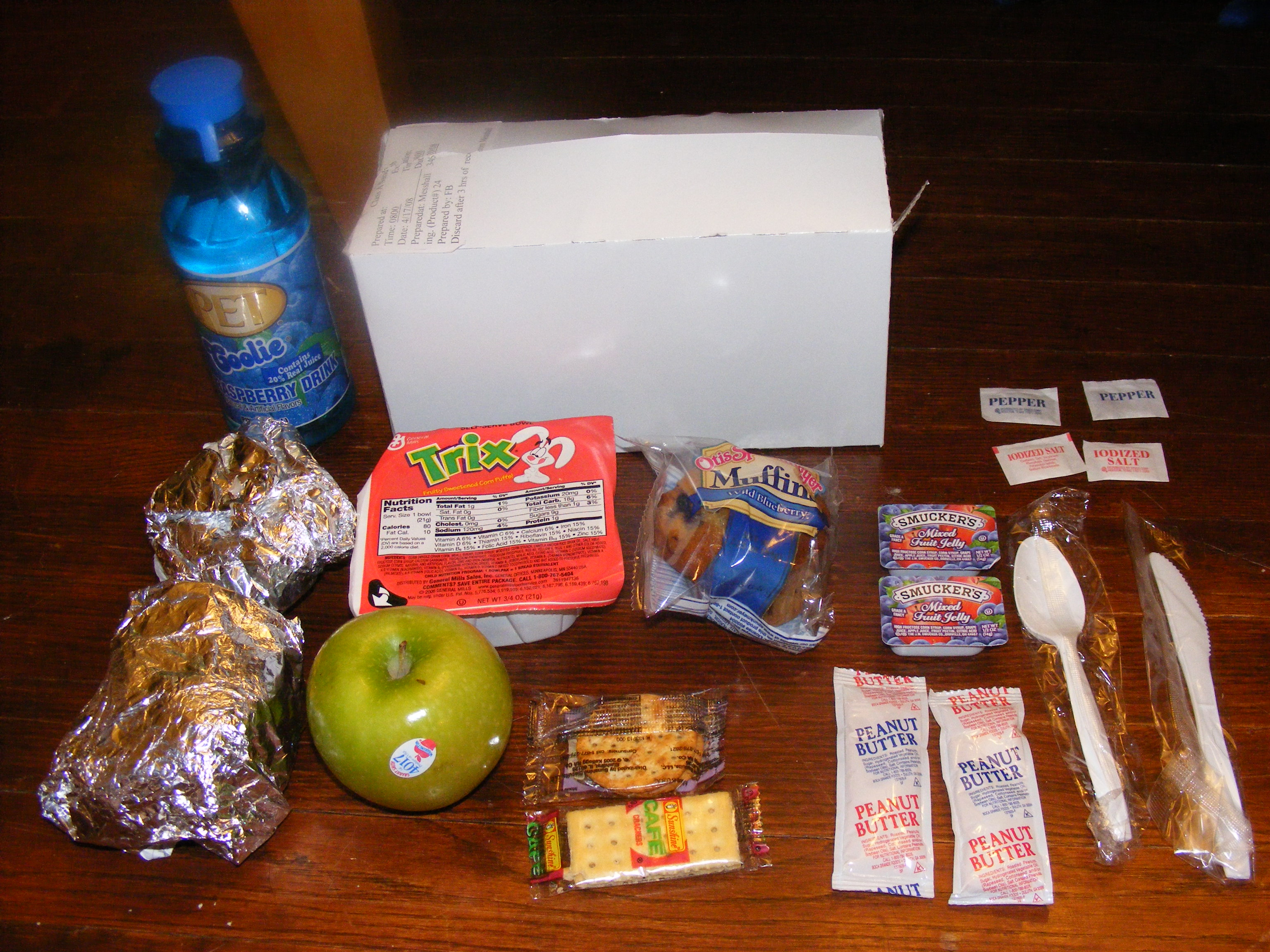
US Military-issued A-ration

Military terminology refers to the terms and language of military organizations, personnel, and military doctrine. Much like other forms of corporate jargon, military terminology is distinguishable from colloquial language by its use of new or repurposed words and phrases typically only understandable by current and former members of the military or associated companies and agencies.

== Common understanding ==
The operational pressure for uniform understanding has developed since the early 20th century with the importance of joint operations between different services (army, navy, air force) of the same country. International alliances and operations, including peacekeeping, have added additional complexity. For example, the NATO alliance now maintains a large dictionary of common terms for use by member countries. Development work is also taking place between NATO and Russia on common terminology for extended air defence, in English, French and Russian.

== Criticism ==
Some claim military terms serve to depoliticise, dehumanise, or otherwise abstract discussion about its operations from an actual description thereof. Similar to "legal terminology" and related to "political terminology", military terms are known for an oblique tendency to incorporate technical language. In many cases, it reflects a need to be precise. It can also reflect a perceived need for operational security, giving away no more information than needed. It can also serve to disguise or distort meaning as with doublespeak. "Kinetic activity" as a buzzword for combat, in use since the inception of the war on terror, has been criticized as a don't-ask-don't-tell policy for murder.

== See also ==
- Category:Military terminology
- Glossary of German military terms
- Glossary of military abbreviations
- List of established military terms
