= False title =

Grammatical construct in English

A false, coined, fake, bogus or pseudo-title, also called a Time-style adjective and an anarthrous nominal premodifier, is a kind of preposed appositive phrase before a noun predominantly found in journalistic writing. It formally resembles a title, in that it does not start with an article, but is a common noun phrase, not a title. An example is the phrase convicted bomber in "convicted bomber Timothy McVeigh", rather than "the convicted bomber Timothy McVeigh".

Some usage writers condemn false titles, and others defend it. Its use was originally American, but it has become widely accepted in some other countries. In British usage it was generally confined to tabloid newspapers but has been making some headway on British websites in recent years.

== Terminology ==
In the description of a false title as an anarthrous nominal premodifier, "anarthrous" means "lacking an article", and "nominal" is used in the sense "of the nature of a noun". Other phrases for the usage include "pseudo title", "coined title" and "preposed appositive".

In "Professor Herbert Marcuse", "Professor" is a title, while in "famed New Left philosopher Herbert Marcuse", "famed New Left philosopher" has the same syntax, with the omitted at the beginning, but is not a title. The linguist Charles F. Meyer wrote that "pseudo-titles" differ from titles in providing a description rather than honoring the person (and that there are gray areas, such as "former Vice President Dan Quayle").

== Usage ==
The practice occurs as early as the late 19th century, as in "The culmination of the episode at Sheepshead Bay last week between Trainer William Walden and Reporter Mayhew, of the Herald … seems to reflect little credit on Editor Bennett." Some authors state that the practice began in or was popularized by the American Time magazine. Like the example above, early examples in Time were capitalized: "Ruskin's famed friend, Painter Sir John Millais". However, now they are usually in lower case. The Chicago Manual of Style observes, "When a title is used in apposition before a personal name – that is, not alone and as part of the name but as an equivalent to it, usually preceded by the or by a modifier – it is considered not a title but rather a descriptive phrase and is therefore lowercased." Meyer has compared the International Corpus of English with an earlier study to document the spread of the construction from American newspapers to those of other countries in the last two decades of the 20th century. In particular, during that time it became even more common in New Zealand and the Philippines than in the United States. He predicts that it is unlikely to appear in conversation.

Meyer notes that "pseudo-titles" (as he calls them) rarely contain a modifying phrase after the initial noun phrase, that is, forms such as "MILF Vice Chairman for Political Affairs Al-Hajj Murad Ebrahim" for the head of the Moro Islamic Liberation Front are rare. Furthermore, they cannot begin with a genitive phrase, "Osias Baldivino, the bureau's litigation and prosecution division chief" cannot be changed to "bureau's litigation and prosecution division chief Osias Baldivino": "bureau's" would need to be removed. He also cites Randolph Quirk's principle of "end-weight", which says that weightier parts of sentences are better placed at the end of sentences or smaller structures. Thus pseudo-titles, which by definition go at the beginning, tend to be short. He notes that pseudo-titles in New Zealand and Philippine newspapers are much more likely to exceed five words than those in the United States and Britain.

False titles are widely used in Nigerian English, capitalized and with a comma separating them from the person's name. This usage is considered incorrect in other countries.

== Controversy ==
Style guides and studies of language have differed strongly on whether the construction is correct:

=== Opposed to false titles ===
In 1965, Theodore Bernstein, a usage writer, strongly deprecated these "coined titles". He gave an example of "a legitimate title ... combined with an illegitimate one" in "Ohio Supreme Court Judge and former trial lawyer James Garfield", which he said was an inversion of the normal "James Garfield, Ohio Supreme Court Judge and former trial lawyer" that gained nothing but awkwardness. He cited the usual lower-casing of these phrases as evidence that those who write them realize they are not true titles.

In 1987, Roy Reed, a professor of journalism, commented that such a sentence as, "This genteel look at New England life, with a formidable circulation of 1 million, warmly profiles Hartland Four Corners, Vt., resident George Seldes, 96", was "gibberish". He added that the phrase "right-wing spokesman Maj. Roberto D'Aubuisson" was ambiguous, as the reader could not tell whether D'Aubuisson was the single spokesman for the Salvadoran right wing or one of many. In addition to placing the descriptive phrase after the name, "where it belongs", Reed suggested that if the phrase goes before the name, it should begin with a or the. Kenneth Bressler, a usage writer, also recommended avoiding the construction and suggested additional ways of doing so in 2003.

The only prescriptive comment in The Columbia Guide to Standard English (2015) is that these constructions "can be tiresome." R. L. Trask, a linguist, used the phrase "preposed appositive" for constructions such as "the Harvard University paleontologist Stephen Jay Gould." In strong terms, he recommended including the initial the (and employing such constructions sparingly anyway).

In 2004 another linguist, Geoffrey Pullum, addressed the subject while commenting on the first sentence of Dan Brown's The Da Vinci Code, which begins, "Renowned curator Jacques Saunière...." Pullum says that a sentence beginning with an "anarthrous occupational nominal premodifier" is "reasonable" in a newspaper, and "It's not ungrammatical; it just has the wrong feel and style for a novel." He further commented that it sounds "like the opening of an obituary rather than an action sequence". False titles are peculiar to Brown's style and occur often in his body of work, Pullum claiming in 2004 that he has "never yet found anyone but Dan Brown using this construction to open a work of fiction".

Merriam Webster's Dictionary of English Usage agrees that the construction "presents no problem of understanding", and those who are not journalists "need never worry about it" in their writing. Likewise, The Columbia Guide to Standard American English (1993) classifies these constructions as "journalese". In 2012 Philip B. Corbett of The New York Times wrote, "We try to avoid the unnatural journalistic mannerism of the 'false title' – that is, using a description or job designation with someone's name as if it were a formal title. So we don't refer to 'novelist Zadie Smith' or 'cellist Yo-Yo Ma'." The 2015 edition of the paper's manual of style says:

Do not make titles out of mere descriptions, as in harpsichordist Dale S. Yagyonak. If in doubt, try the "good morning" test. If it is not possible to imagine saying, "Good morning, Harpsichordist Yagyonak," the title is false.

=== In favor of false titles ===
In 2009, usage writer William Safire stated that the article "the" gives the title excessive emphasis and that it sounds strange to American speakers. According to Bill Walsh, writing in 2004, The New York Times is the only American newspaper that forbids false titles. He considers that the alternative "may seem stilted, even wacky", because false titles are in widespread use.

== British usage ==
British style guides have in the past considered the construction not only journalese but an Americanism, or at least less "embedded" in British English. The journal The Economist proscribes the use of the false title. The style guide of the newspaper The Guardian advises against it. As of 2018, the BBC style guide said that the construction can avoid "unnecessary clutter".
