= Battler (underdog) =

Australian term for working-class hard worker

Battlers, in Australian colloquialism, are ordinary working-class people who persevere through their commitments despite adversity. Typically, this adversity comprises low pay, family problems, environmental hardships and personal recognition woes. It is a term of respect and endearment intended to empower and recognise those who feel as though they exist at the bottom of society. It has seen 21st century use in mainstream politics to describe a demographic of Australian people, most notably by former prime minister John Howard, who used it to describe his working-class voting base.

== Definition ==
The term "Aussie battler" generally refers to working-class Australians; specifically, those who feel they must work hard at a low paying job to earn enough money. Such a term is actually well respected by Australian society at large, as they stoically face perceived financial hardships in spite of Australian workers being among some of the highest-paid and resourceful in the western world. "Aussie battler" is an example of self-aggrandising language, designed to counter feelings of stigma or inadequacy, and to bolster confidence in being a member of the Australian underclass. It refers to an Australian who perseveres in the face of adversity and hardship. It is a term of respect and endearment, not simply used to assess someone's financial situation; the ordinary working Australian earning a living against the odds. The common variation "little Aussie battler" further adds to the notion that the battler is at the bottom of society, working under bigger things above.

In Australian English, "battler" is a power word similar to the concept of the "hardworking family". It is used by various political personages and entities for their own purposes. Where in one context a person may use the term to refer to people of low socioeconomic status to call for greater welfare, others may use it to refer to a family saving for a private education to call for government payments to private schools.

== Middle class ==
Some people are self-defined battlers without fitting the above definition for having too much money. In 2003, social scientist and author Michael Pusey described the condition behind this to talk show host Rachael Kohn as "Middle Class Battler syndrome".

== Political rhetoric ==
Following the election of the Liberal National Coalition government under the leadership of John Howard in 1996, the phrase was adapted and widely adopted within Australian public discourse. Howard scored a sweeping victory at the 1996 federal election, an achievement some commentators explained by reference to his winning over many traditional Labor Party voters, whom they now termed "Howard's battlers".

The term was allegedly popularised by Andrew Robb, the 1996 Liberal Party campaign director, who used it to describe those blue-collar voters who felt ignored by Labor and who were successfully targeted by the Liberals during the election campaign.

In a radio interview in 2004, Howard was asked what he thought a battler was and replied:

... it's not an exclusive definition, the battler is somebody who finds in life that they have to work hard for everything they get... normally you then look at it in terms of somebody who's not earning a huge income but somebody who is trying to better themselves, and I've always been attracted to people who try to better themselves.

During the Asia-Pacific Economic Cooperation (APEC) summit in Sydney in September 2007, US President George W. Bush referred to Howard as a battler.

== See also ==
- "Working Class Man" – 1985 song by Australian singer Jimmy Barnes
- Reagan Democrats
