= Buzzword bingo =

Bingo-style word game

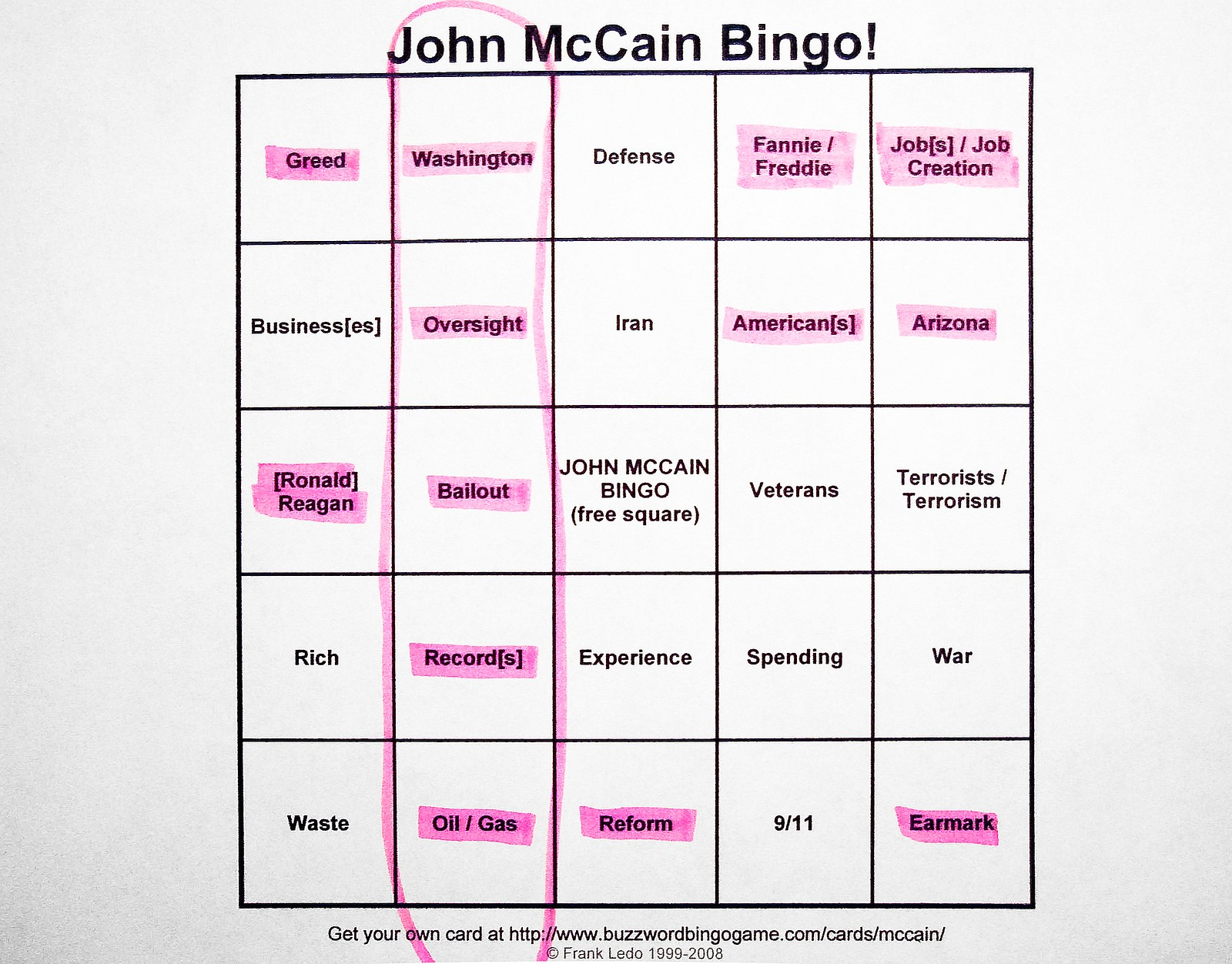
John McCain buzzword bingo from the 2008 presidential election. A player has won by circling "Washington", "Oversight", "Bailout", "Record[s]" and "Oil/Gas".

Buzzword bingo, also known as bullshit bingo, is a bingo-style game where participants prepare bingo cards with buzzwords and tick them off when they are uttered during an event, such as a meeting or speech. The goal of the game is to tick off a predetermined number of words in a row and then signal bingo to other players.

== Concept ==
Buzzword bingo is generally played in situations where audience members feel that the speaker is relying too heavily on buzzwords or jargon rather than providing relevant details or clarity. Business meetings led by guest speakers or notable company personalities from higher up the pay scale are often viewed as a good opportunity for buzzword bingo, as the language used by these speakers often includes predictable references to arcane business concepts, which are perfect for use in the creation of buzzword bingo cards.

Turkey bingo requires the winner to ask a question or make a statement using his/her winning bingo words, thus signaling the win to insiders while ideally prompting the speaker to respond as if the question or statement were real. An alternate variation requires the person who has achieved bingo to raise his or her hand and use the word "Bingo" within the context of a comment or question. Other versions of the game require actually yelling "Bingo!" To avoid the reprimands that would likely result from doing so, participants may resort to looking at one another and silently mouthing the word "Bingo" instead.

An example of a buzzword bingo card for a business management meeting is shown below.

Scalable	Life Cycle	Markets	Timeline	Restructuring
Risk Management	Off-line	Sales Driven	Penetration	Drop the Ball
Benchmark	Proactive	Free Space	Customer Value	R.O.I.
Paradigm	Strategy	Disruptive	Schedule	Cost
Review	Granular	Facilitate	Touch Base	Out of the Loop

== Creation and popularization ==
The game has existed for many years, though without a universally-used name, and it is likely that its creation can be credited to several people working independently.

By 1992, college students in the USA were playing a game called "turkey bingo" where they guessed which classmates would dominate conversations in classrooms. This led to a variant popular in business schools called "bullshit bingo" based on overused business lingo. The Buzzword Bingo name was coined in early 1993 in an internal Silicon Graphics tool made by principal scientist Tom Davis in collaboration with Seth Katz, and popularized in 1993 in the first public web version by fellow employee Chris Pirazzi The 22 February 1994 Dilbert comic featured buzzword bingo in an office meeting.

One documented example occurred when Al Gore, then the Vice President of the United States, known for his liberal use of buzzwords in enthusiastically promoting technology, spoke at MIT's 1996 graduation. MIT hackers had distributed bingo cards containing buzzwords to the graduating class. Gore, who had been informed of the prank, acknowledged it during his speech.

In 2007, IBM created a TV advertisement that was based on the concept of buzzword bingo. Video gaming website GameSpot hosted a video called "Executive Buzzword Bingo", in which they held a running tally of buzzwords uttered during Sony's "PlayStation Meeting 2013" conference event on 20 February 2013.

== See also ==
- Buzzword compliant
- Corporate jargon
- Loaded language
- Verbiage
