= Glittering generality =

Phrase which appeals to positive emotion without supporting reason

In rhetoric, a glittering generality or glowing generality is an emotionally appealing phrase so closely associated with highly valued concepts and beliefs that it carries conviction without supporting information or reason. Such highly valued concepts attract general approval and acclaim. Their appeal is to emotions such as love of country and home, and desire for peace, freedom, glory, and honor. They ask for approval without examination of the reason. They are typically used in propaganda posters/advertisements and used by propagandists and politicians. Often they are catchphrases or slogans.

== Origins ==
The term dates from the mid-19th century in the American context. Advocates for abolition of slavery argued that the institution was contradictory to the United States Declaration of Independence's statements that "all men are created equal" and possessed natural rights to "life, liberty, and the pursuit of happiness." Proslavery opponents countered that the Declaration was a collection of inspirational statements intended for revolution, rather than a concrete set of principles for civil society.

Rufus Choate, a Whig senator from Massachusetts, likely brought the term into general discourse. In a widely distributed 1851 address at Boston's Fanueil Hall, Choate praised fellow New Englander Daniel Webster's moderate stance on slavery, claiming that Webster showed prudence in not "taking a single idea and...exaggerating it out of its nature by ascending a stage and there throwing up for huzzas of the crowd a glittering generality into the air; by taking the Declaration of Independence or the Lord’s Prayer and presenting it to a self-complacent audience, by deducing from them, fraudulently, the necessity of instant and universal emancipation." In an August 1856 public letter to the Maine Whig Committee (again, widely reprinted in the newspapers of the period), Choate expressed fear that antislavery Whigs, inspired by the Declaration's "glittering and sound generalities," would destroy the Union. The letter – and especially Choate's phrase – became the topic of much public debate in the northern press. However, it is unclear whether the phrase was originated by Choate or Franklin J. Dickman, a judge and legal scholar of that era.

Abraham Lincoln, in an April 6, 1859 letter to Henry L. Pierce, criticized political opponents of the day who slighted the foundational principles of Thomas Jefferson as "glittering generalities". Lincoln asserted that Jefferson's abstract ideals were not mere rhetoric, but the "definitions and axioms of free society."

The term then came to be used for any set of ideas or principles that are appealing but nonspecific. In the 1930s, the Institute for Propaganda Analysis popularized the term as one of its "seven propaganda devices."

== Qualities ==
A glittering generality has two qualities: it is vague and it has positive connotations. Words and phrases such as "common good", "reform", "courage", "democracy", "freedom", "hope", "patriotism", “family values”, "strength", are terms with which people all over the world have powerful associations, and they may have trouble disagreeing with them. However, these words are highly abstract and ambiguous, and meaningful differences exist regarding what they actually mean or should mean in the real world.

George Orwell described such words at length in his essay "Politics and the English Language":

The words democracy, socialism, freedom, patriotic, realistic, justice have each of them several different meanings which cannot be reconciled with one another. In the case of a word like democracy, not only is there no agreed definition, but the attempt to make one is resisted from all sides. It is almost universally felt that when we call a country democratic we are praising it: consequently the defenders of every kind of regime claim that it is a democracy, and fear that they might have to stop using that word if it were tied down to any one meaning. Words of this kind are often used in a consciously dishonest way. That is, the person who uses them has his own private definition, but allows his hearer to think he means something quite different. Statements like "Marshal Pétain was a true patriot," "The Soviet press is the freest in the world," "The Catholic Church is opposed to persecution," are almost always made with intent to deceive. Other words used in variable meanings, in most cases more or less dishonestly, are: class, totalitarian, liberal, reactionary, equality.

== See also ==
- Abstract concept – Fundamental unit of cognition
- Appeal to emotion – Informal logical fallacy
- Buzzword – Word or phrase used to impress
- Code word – Word or phrase with a special meaning
- Dog-whistle – Political messaging using coded language
- Forer effect – Tendency to interpret vague statements as meaningful ones
- Hardworking families – Example of a glittering generality in contemporary political discourse
- Ideograph (rhetoric) – Type of word in political discourse
- If-by-whiskey – Example of firm rhetorical prevarication
- Logical fallacy – Form of incorrect argument in natural language
- Language and thought – Study of how language influences thought
- Loaded language – Rhetoric used to influence an audience
- Oversimplification – Assumption of a single cause where multiple factors may be necessary
- Platitude – Trite, prosaic, or cliché truism
- Rhetorical device – Literary technique used to persuade
- Thought-terminating cliche – Commonly used phrase used to quell cognitive dissonance
