= Phaedra Pezzullo =

Phaedra C. Pezzullo is an American author and scholar working as a professor of communication at the University of Colorado Boulder. She specializes in environmental communication and rhetoric, public advocacy, tourist studies, and cultural studies.

== Background ==
Pezzullo earned her M.A. in 1998 and her Ph.D. in 2002 from the University of North Carolina at Chapel Hill, both in Communication Studies. She also holds a B.A. in Social Thought and Political Economy and a B.S. in Natural Resources from the University of Massachusetts Amherst (1996).

== Professional life ==
From 2002 to 2015, Pezzullo held academic appointments at Indiana University in Bloomington, Indiana. In 2015, Pezzullo accepted an appointment in the Department of Communication at the University of Colorado Boulder, where she currently holds the position of associate professor.

As of Spring 2017, Pezzullo has served on the editorial board of several academic journals, including Cultural Studies, Communication and Critical/Cultural Studies, Communication Monographs, Environmental Communication, and Quarterly Journal of Speech.

In addition to book awards, Pezzullo has received awards from the National Communication Association and from Indiana University for teaching and service.

== Scholarly works ==
Pezzullo has brought attention to the modern issues of environmental justice in a world of consumerism and political economics. She discusses and analyzes these topics in terms of communication and social effects (along with their interaction with demographics like race and gender) in her book, Toxic Tourism: Rhetorics of Travel, Pollution, and Environmental Justice (2007), and in many of her published articles. Toxic Tourism won the Jane Jacobs Urban Communication Book Award (Urban Communication Foundation, 2010), the James A. Winans-Herbert A. Wichelns Memorial Award for Distinguished Scholarship in Rhetoric/Public Address (National Communication Association, 2007), the Christine L. Oravec Research Award in Environmental Communication (NCA, 2007), and the Book of the Year Award for the Critical and Cultural Studies Division (NCA, 2007). She is also consulted in media on issues surrounding climate justice and the role of collective action in achieving environmental justice.

With Robert Cox she coauthored Environmental Communication and the Public Sphere, 4th Edition (2016), a textbook in the environmental communication field. The book discusses the history and development of the field of environmental communication, the modern implications of the field, and the ways humans and the environment interact with and influence each other. It also talks about how human beings react to environmental issues or problems, and how we choose to act in relation to these perceived problems.

Environmental Justice and Environmentalism: The Social Justice Challenge to the Environmental Movement (2007), which Pezzullo edited alongside philosophy professor Ronald Sandler, discusses the tensions and angles of two intertwined movements of environmentalism and environmental justice. The former has been criticized by the latter for perceived racism, elitism, and lack of humanitarian concern. The text also analyzes both sides in context of changing climate, environmental laws, and attitudes in the US.

Related to Pezzullo's environmental focus is her concern with "pinkwashing", a phenomenon discussed in her article "Resisting 'National Breast Cancer Awareness Month': The Rhetoric of Counterpublics and their Cultural Performances". The idea of pinkwashing centers on businesses' disingenuous participation in National Breast Cancer Awareness Month not out of concern for health, but for purposes of cosmetic targeting, gendered performance, and public relations. Pezzullo says these campaigns fail to address environmental pollution as a large cause of breast cancer, possibly because the corporations in question contribute to this very pollution. Pinkwashing a campaign is a way for businesses to appear moral while earning more money from consumers who believe they are contributing to a just cause, as the campaigns increasingly focus on gendered images of beauty, breasts, and pink imagery.

== See also ==
- Pinkwashing (LGBT)
- Public rhetoric
