= Complex words =

Words formed of two or more morphemes

Complex words are words consisting of two or more morphemes. In morphology, they are distinguished from simple or simplex words, which consist of a single morpheme and possess no internal structure (e.g., walk, house, green). Complex words are formed through morphological processes such as compounding, derivation, and inflection.

== Morphemes ==
Morphemes are defined as the smallest meaning-bearing units within a language. While simplex words contain only one such unit, complex words combine multiple units. For instance, the word builder is complex because it contains the root build (referring to the action) and the suffix -er (referring to the doer of the action).

Ideally, every morpheme contributes a distinct meaning to the whole. However, linguistics recognises exceptions known as cranberry morphemes. These are bound morphemes that appear to have no independent meaning in current usage but serve to distinguish the word, such as cran- in cranberry.

Morphemes are categorised based on their ability to stand alone:

- Free morphemes: Can constitute a word in their own right (e.g., horse, dance).
- Bound morphemes: Cannot stand alone and must attach to a host (e.g., -ish, -s, en-).

== Affixation ==
Affixation involves combining a bound morpheme (an affix) with a free morpheme or an existing complex word. Affixes are classified by their position relative to the host word:

- Suffixes: Attach to the right of the host (e.g., solid-ify, wash-able).
- Prefixes: Attach to the left of the host (e.g., de-throne, en-large).
- Circumfixes: Consist of two parts that attach simultaneously to the left and right. For example, the Dutch past participle is formed using the circumfix ge- -d (e.g., ge-speel-d, meaning 'played').
- Infixes: Inserted into the middle of a base word. This occurs in Tagalog, where the affix -um- converts a noun or adjective base into a verb (e.g., bili 'buy' becomes b-um-ili).

== Formation processes ==
Complex words are generally built through three primary processes: compounding, derivation, and inflection.

=== Compounding ===
Compounding is the combination of two or more free morphemes to create a new complex word.

- Examples: sea + horse → sea horse; head + strong → headstrong.

This process can be highly productive. Speakers may create novel compounds (nonce words) that adhere to morphological principles even if they are not yet established in the lexicon, such as gorilla window (a window for viewing gorillas).

=== Derivation ===
Derivation involves adding an affix that creates a new word, often changing the lexical category or adding a substantial meaning component.

- Examples: build (verb) + -er → builder (noun); industry (noun) → industrial (adjective) → industrialize (verb).

=== Inflection ===
Inflection adds grammatical information to a word without changing its lexical category. It indicates properties such as number, person, or tense.

- Examples: work + -s (third person singular subject); house + -s (plural).

A key distinction between derivation and inflection is syntactic obligation. Inflectional morphology is often required by the syntactic context (e.g., a third-person singular subject requires the verb to carry the -s suffix in English). Derivational morphology is not syntactically obligatory in the same manner.

== Zero derivation and null affixes ==
In some instances, complex words appear to change category or carry grammatical meaning without visible morphological markers.

- Conversion (Zero Derivation): A word changes lexical category without an overt affix. For example, the verb to cook and the noun a cook show the same relationship as to build and a builder, despite the lack of a suffix in the former. This is analysed as the presence of a null derivational affix.
- Null Inflection: The absence of an overt marker may function as a marker itself. For instance, while English verbs require -s for third-person singular, the lack of a suffix for first or second person implies a "null affix" denoting those persons.

== Internal structure ==
The internal structure of complex words is hierarchical and can be represented using tree diagrams. These diagrams visualise how morphemes combine in a specific order. For example, in the word school teachers, the root teach combines with -er to form the noun teacher, which then compounds with school, and finally receives the plural inflection -s.

Complex words can exhibit structural ambiguity, where a single string of morphemes can be analysed via different hierarchical trees, resulting in different meanings. The compound ex-president-office-manager could mean:

1. The manager of the office of an ex-president (where ex- modifies president).
2. The former manager of a president's office (where ex- modifies manager).
