= Concept creep =

Expansion of a concept to the point of meaninglessness

Concept creep (also known as semantic creep) is the process by which harm-related topics experience semantic expansion to include topics which would not have originally been envisaged to be included under that label. It was first described in a Psychological Inquiry article by Nick Haslam in 2016, who identified its effects on the concepts of abuse, bullying, trauma, mental disorder, addiction, and prejudice. Others have identified its effects on terms like "gaslight" and "emotional labour". The phenomenon can be related to the concept of hyperbole.

Although the initial research on concept creep has focused on concepts central to the political left's ideology, psychologists have also found evidence that people identifying with the political right have more expansive interpretations of concepts central to their own ideology (namely sexual deviance, personal responsibility and terrorism).

== Forms ==
Haslam distinguished two forms of concept creep. Horizontal expansion occurs when a concept extends to qualitatively new phenomena or contexts, such as the extension of abuse to include emotional maltreatment and neglect. Vertical expansion occurs when a concept extends to less severe instances of the phenomena it already describes, for example through lowered thresholds or relaxed defining criteria. Both forms broaden the range of experiences or behaviours covered by a concept.

== Applications, influence and reception ==
The broadening of harm-related concepts described by concept creep has been criticised for making people more sensitive to harms and for blurring people's thinking and understanding of such terms, by categorising too many things together which should not be, and by losing the clarity and specificity of a term.

Greg Lukianoff and Jonathan Haidt applied the concept to expanding understandings of safety in their 2018 book The Coddling of the American Mind, arguing that these had come to encompass protection from emotional discomfort.

== See also ==
- Essentially contested concept
- Euphemism treadmill
- Victim mentality
- Boiling frog
