= John Lucaites =

American professor of rhetoric

John Louis Lucaites (born 1952) is an American academic. He is a provost professor emeritus of rhetoric and public culture at Indiana University. In 2012, Lucaites was appointed as associate dean for arts and humanities and undergraduate education at Indiana University. His research concerns the general relationship between rhetoric and social theory, and seeks to contribute in particular to the critique and reconstruction of liberalism in contemporary social, political, and cultural practices in the United States.

== Education ==
Lucaites obtained a BA in 1974 from Rutgers College, an MA in 1975 from the University of North Carolina at Chapel Hill, and a PhD in 1984 from the University of Iowa.

== Awards ==
- Douglas W. Ehninger Distinguished Rhetorical Scholar Award of the National Communication Association, 2014, "for his work on civil rights rhetorics and in visual rhetorics"
- Diamond Anniversary Book Award and James A. Winans-Herbert A. Wichelns Memorial Award for Distinguished Scholarship in Rhetoric and Public Address, National Communication Association, 2008, both for No caption needed
- Golden Anniversary Monograph Award, National Communications Association, 2004, for Robert Hariman and John Louis Lucaites, “Public Identity and Collective Memory in U.S. Iconic Photography: The Image of ‘Accidental Napalm’,” Critical Studies in Media Communication, 20 (2003): 35-66.
- Golden Anniversary Monograph Award, National Communications Association, 2002, for Robert Hariman and John Louis Lucaites, “Dissent and Emotional Management in a Liberal-Democratic Society: The Kent State Iconic Photograph,” Rhetoric and Society Quarterly, 31 (2001): 5-32.
- Golden Anniversary Monograph Award, National Communications Association, 1997, for Marouf Hasian, Celeste M. Condit, and John L. Lucaites, “The Rhetorical Boundaries of ‘the Law’: A Consideration of the Rhetorical Culture of Legal Practice and the Case of the ‘Separate But Equal’ Doctrine,” Quarterly Journal of Speech, 82 (1996): 323–342.

== Books ==
- Condit, Celeste Michelle; Lucaites, John Louis (1993). Crafting Equality: America's Anglo-African Word. Chicago: University of Chicago Press. ISBN 0-226-11464-3. OCLC 26502621.
- Calloway-Thomas, Carolyn; Lucaites, John Louis, eds. (1993). Martin Luther King, Jr., and the Sermonic Power of Public Discourse. University of Alabama Press.
- Lucaites, John Louis; Condit, Celeste Michelle; Caudill, Sally (1999). Contemporary Rhetorical Theory: A Reader. Guilford Press.
- Hariman, Robert; Lucaites, John Louis (2007). No Caption Needed: Iconic Photographs, Public Culture, and Liberal Democracy. Chicago: University of Chicago Press. ISBN 978-0-226-31606-2. OCLC 71004144.
- Biesecker, Barbara A.; Lucaites, John Louis, eds. (2009). Rhetoric, Materiality, and Politics. Peter Lang Publishing.
- Hariman, Robert; Lucaites, John Louis (2016). The Public Image: Photography and Civic Spectatorship. Chicago: University of Chicago Press. ISBN 978-0-226-34293-1. OCLC 935495141.
