= Journalese =

Linguistic register used in news media

Journalese is the artificial or hyperbolic, and sometimes over-abbreviated, language regarded as characteristic of the news style used in popular media. It has sometimes been criticized.

== Examples ==
As early as the 1880s, people criticized the stilted, cliched language used in journalism as journalese. Journalists, who write many similar stories under time pressure, may fall back on cliched or familiar phrases. Journalese often takes the form of specific turns of phrase, such as "hammered out agreement" or "called for tighter restrictions". Terms with legal meanings, such as "mayhem", may be overused to the point that they become meaningless. Journalese can also take the form of specific word choice. This is most obvious with the use of rare or archaic words such as ink (as a verb), nab, slated, ailing, quizzed (in place of "asked" or "questioned"), funnyman, or synonyms of attack to mean criticise. In some cases, this is due to fossil words that are present in idiomatic journalese statements. Journalese can be a result of a desire to save on page space by using shorter words or phrases.

Brevity is particularly important in headlines, which have their own idiosyncratic style of writing called headlinese. Headlinese's focus on using the smallest possible words has influenced the vocabulary choice of news stories themselves. Anthropomorphization is another form of journalese, such as with the use of the verb saw (past tense of see) in the phrase "The 1990s saw an increase in crime", which is used to avoid using the past tense of "increase", as in "Crime increased in the 1990s". Other forms include use of onomatopoeia, genitives of place names ("New York's Central Park" rather than "Central Park, in New York"), and gap filler articles like bus plunge stories.

Some people regard journalese with amusement, due to its frequent colourful use of language, and some terms can make news reports easier to understand, such as replacing complex jargon with simple and concise phrases. However, political correspondent Robert Hutton says that "lazy writing goes with lazy thought", and it is often a mark of a weak story with poor evidence or an attempt to dress up something as more significant or interesting: "Journalese is like a poker player's tell: it shows that the reporter knows the story is flimsy, and he or she is trying to make it appear more solid." Other critics fault the use of the passive voice and similar constructions in journalese as a form of weasel wording where the writer chooses "to hide the culprit" of the action that the writer is describing. Newspaper subeditors (copy editors) are often trained to remove journalese, and The New York Times has a customised grammar checker that flags egregious journalese examples.

== See also ==
- Academese
- False title
- Legalese
- Varietyese
