= Essentially contested concept =

Problem in philosophy

An essentially contested concept is an abstract term or phrase that provides value judgements which can be contested. The term essentially contested concept was proposed to facilitate an understanding of the different interpretations of abstractions that have qualitative and evaluative notions—such as "art", "time", "philanthropy", "power", and "social justice". The notion of an essentially contested concept was proposed in 1956 by Walter Bryce Gallie.

Essentially contested concepts involve agreed on abstract concepts or phrases, but whose usage and interpretation is disputable by others (e.g. "social justice", "This picture is a work of art"). They are abstract concepts, "proper use of which inevitably involves endless disputes about their proper uses on the part of their users", and these disputes "cannot be settled by appeal to empirical evidence, linguistic usage, or the canons of logic alone". Usually, essentially contested concepts are found in the social sciences where confusion arises due to experts using terminology inconsistently and often failing to specify the relationship between an abstract term and the meaning of that term.

For example, in historical studies, it has been observed that there are no particular standards for historical topics such as religion, art, science, democracy, and social justice, as these are by their nature "essentially contested" fields that require diverse tools particular to each field beforehand in order to interpret topics from those subjects. When scholars talk about "religion," "art," "science," "democracy," etc., there is no one definition of such terms that is generally accepted, and thus they are essentially contested by default among scholars.

== Identifying the presence of a dispute ==
Although Gallie's term is widely used to denote imprecise use of technical terminology, it has a far more specific application; although the notion could be misleadingly and evasively used to justify "agreeing to disagree", the term offers something more valuable:

Since its introduction by W.B. Gallie in 1956, the expression "essentially contested concept" has been treated both as a challenge and as an excuse by social theorists. It has been treated as a challenge in that theorists consider their uses of terms and concepts to be in competition with the uses advocated by other theorists, each theorist trying to be deemed the champion. It has been treated as an excuse in that, rather than acknowledge that the failure to reach agreement is due to such factors as imprecision, ignorance, or belligerence, instead theorists point to the terms and concepts under dispute and insist that they are always open to contest — that they are terms and concepts about which we can never expect to reach agreement.

The disputes that attend an essentially contested concept are driven by substantive disagreements over a range of different, entirely reasonable (although perhaps mistaken) interpretations of a mutually-agreed-upon archetypical notion, such as the legal precept "treat like cases alike; and treat different cases differently", with "each party [continuing] to defend its case with what it claims to be convincing arguments, evidence and other forms of justification".

Gallie speaks of how "This picture is painted in oils" can be successfully contested if the work is actually painted in tempera; while "This picture is a work of art" may meet strong opposition due to disputes over what "work of art" denotes. He suggests three avenues whereby one might resolve such disputes:

1. Discovering a new meaning of "work of art" to which all disputants could thenceforward agree.
2. Convincing all the disputants to conform to one meaning.
3. Declaring "work of art" to be a number of different concepts employing the same name.

Otherwise, the dispute probably centres on polysemy. Here, a number of critical questions must be asked:

- Has the term been incorrectly used, as in the case of mistakenly using decimated for devastated (catachresis)?
- Do two or more different concepts share the same word, as in the case of ear, bank, sound, corn, scale, etc. (homonymy)?
- Is there a genuine dispute about the term's correct application that, in fact, can be resolved?
- Or, is it really the case that the term is an essentially contested concept?

=== Contested versus contestable ===
Barry Clarke suggested that, in order to determine whether a particular dispute was a consequence of true polysemy or inadvertent homonymy, one should seek to "locate the source of the dispute"; and in doing so, one might find that the source was "within the concept itself", or "[within] some underlying non-conceptual disagreement between the contestants".

Clarke drew attention to the substantial differences between the expressions "essentially contested" and "essentially contestable", that were being extensively used within the literature as if they were interchangeable.

Clarke argued that to state that a concept is merely "contested" is to "attribute significance to the contest rather than to the concept". Yet, to state that a concept is "contestable" (rather than "merely contested") is to "attribute some part of any contest to the concept"; namely, "to claim that some feature or property of the concept makes it polysemantic, and that [from this] the concept contains some internal conflict of ideas"; and it's this state of affairs that provides the "essentially contestable concept" with its "inherent potential [for] generating disputes".

== Features ==
In 1956 Gallie proposed a set of seven conditions for the existence of an essentially contested concept. Gallie was very specific about the limits of his enterprise: it dealt exclusively with abstract, qualitative notions, such as art, religion, science, democracy, and social justice (and, if Gallie's choices are contrasted with negatively regarded concepts such as evil, disease, superstition, etc., it is clear that the concepts he chose were exclusively positively regarded).

Freeden remarks that "not all essentially contested concepts signify valued achievements; they may equally signify disapproved and denigrated phenomena," and Gerring asks us to imagine just how difficult it would be to "[try] to craft definitions of slavery, fascism, terrorism, or genocide without recourse to 'pejorative' attributes."

These features distinguish Gallie's "essentially contested concepts" from others, "which can be shown, as a result of analysis or experiment, to be radically confused"; or, as Gray would have it, they are the features that relate to the task of distinguishing the "general words, which really denote an essentially contested concept" from those other "general words, whose uses conceal a diversity of distinguishable concepts."

The following are extensions of Gallie's original seven features that have been made by various scholars from across multiple disciplines:

1. Essentially contested concepts are evaluative, and they deliver value-judgements.
2. Essentially contested concepts denote comprehensively evaluated entities that have an internally complex character.
3. The evaluation must be attributed to the internally complex entity as a whole.
4. The different constituent elements of that internally complex entity are initially variously describable.
5. The different users of the concept will often allocate substantially different orders of relative importance, substantially different "weights", and/or substantially different interpretations to each of those constituent elements.
6. Psychological and sociological causes influence the extent to which any particular consideration is salient for a given individual, regarded as a stronger reason by that individual than by another, and regarded as a reason by one individual and not by another.
7. The disputed concepts are open-ended and vague, and are subject to considerable modification in the light of changing circumstances.
8. This further modification can neither be predicted nor prescribed in advance.
9. Whilst, by Gallie's express stipulation, there is no best instantiation of an essentially contested concept (or, at least, none knowable to be the best), it is also obvious that some instantiations will be considerably better than others; and, furthermore, even if one particular instantiation seems best at the moment, there is always the possibility that a new, better instantiation will emerge in the future.
10. Each party knows and recognizes that its own peculiar usage/interpretation of the concept is disputed by others who, in their turn, hold different and quite incompatible views.
11. Each party must (at least to a certain extent) understand the criteria upon which the other participants’ (repudiated) views are based.
12. Disputes centred on essentially contested concepts are "perfectly genuine", "not resolvable by argument", and "nevertheless sustained by perfectly respectable arguments and evidence".
13. Each party's use of their own specific usage/interpretation is driven by a need to uphold their own particular (correct, proper and superior) usage/interpretation against that of all other (incorrect, improper and irrational) users.
14. Because the use of an essentially contested concept is always the application of one use against all other uses, any usage is intentionally aggressive and defensive.
15. Because it is essentially contested, rather than "radically confused", the continued use of the essentially contested concept is justified by the fact that, despite all of their on-going disputation, all of the competitors acknowledge that the contested concept is derived from a single common exemplar.
16. The continued use of the essentially contested concept also helps to sustain and develop our understanding of the concept's original exemplar/s.

== Concepts and conceptions ==
Scholars such as H. L. A. Hart, John Rawls, Ronald Dworkin, and Steven Lukes have variously embellished Gallie's proposal by arguing that certain of the difficulties encountered with Gallie's proposition may be due to the unintended conflation of two separate domains associated with the term concept:

1. the concepts (the abstract, ideal notions themselves), and
2. the conceptions (the particular instantiations, or realizations of those ideal and abstract notions).

In essence, Hart (1961), Rawls (1971), Dworkin (1972), and Lukes (1974) distinguished between the "unity" of a notion and the "multiplicity" of its possible instantiations. From their work it is easy to understand the issue as one of determining whether there is a single notion that has a number of different instantiations, or whether there is more than one notion, each of which is reflected in a different usage.

In a section of his 1972 article in The New York Review of Books, Dworkin used the example of "fairness" to isolate and elaborate the difference between a concept (suum cuique) and its conception (various instantiations, for example utilitarian ethics).

He supposes that he has instructed his children not to treat others "unfairly" and asks us to recognize that, whilst he would have undoubtedly had particular "examples" (of the sorts of conduct he was intending to discourage) in mind at the time he spoke to his children, whatever it was that he meant when he issued such instructions was not confined to those "examples" alone, for two reasons:

1. "I would expect my children to apply my instructions to situations I had not and could not have thought about."
2. "I stand ready to admit that some particular act I had thought was fair when I spoke was in fact unfair, or vice versa, if one of my children is able to convince me of that later."

Dworkin argues that this admission of error would not entail any "change" to his original instructions, because the true meaning of his instructions was that "[he] meant the family to be guided by the concept of fairness, not by any specific conception of fairness [that he] might have had in mind". Therefore, he argues, his instructions do, in fact, "cover" this new case.

Exploring what he considers to be the "crucial distinction" between the overall concept of "fairness" and some particular, and specific conception of "fairness", he asks us to imagine a group whose members share the view that certain acts are unfair. The members of this group "agree on a great number of standard cases of unfairness and use these as benchmarks against which to test other, more controversial cases". In these circumstances, says Dworkin, "the group has a concept of unfairness, and its members may appeal to that concept in moral instruction or argument." However, the members may still disagree over many of these "controversial cases"; and differences of this sort indicate that members have, or act upon, entirely different theories of why and how each of the "standard cases" are, in fact, genuine acts of "unfairness". And, because each considers that certain principles "[which] must be relied upon to show that a particular division or attribution is unfair" are more "fundamental" than certain other principles, it can be said that members of the group have different conceptions of "fairness".

Consequently, those responsible for giving "instructions", and those responsible for setting "standards" of "fairness", in this community may be doing one of two things:

1. Appealing to the concept of "fairness", by demanding that others act "fairly". In this case, those instructed to act "fairly" are responsible for "developing and applying their own conception of fairness as controversial cases arise". Each of those issuing the instructions (or setting the standards) may have quite different explanations underlying their actions; and, also, they may well change their explanations from time to time, without ever changing the standards they set.
2. Laying down a particular conception of "fairness"; by, for example, specifying that all hard cases were to be decided "by applying the utilitarian ethics of Jeremy Bentham".

It is important to recognize that rather than it just being a case of delivering two different instructions; it is a case of delivering two different kinds of instruction:

1. In the case of the appeal to the concept of "fairness", one invokes the ideal (and, implicitly, the universally agreed upon) notion of "fairness"; and whatever one might believe is the best instantiation of that notion is, by and large, irrelevant.
2. In the case of laying down a conception of "fairness", one specifies what one believes to be the best instantiation of the notion "fairness"; and, by this action, one specifies what one means by "fairness"; and whatever one might believe is the ideal notion of "fairness" is, by and large, irrelevant.

As a consequence, according to Dworkin, whenever an appeal is made to "fairness", a moral issue is raised; and, whenever a conception of "fairness" is laid down, an attempt is being made to answer that moral issue.

== Not "hotly disputed" concepts ==
Whilst Gallie's expression "essentially contested concepts" precisely denotes those "essentially questionable and corrigible concepts" which "are permanently and essentially subject to revision and question", close examination of the wide and varied and imprecise applications of Gallie's term subsequent to 1956, by those who have ascribed their own literal meaning to Gallie's term without ever consulting Gallie's work, have led many philosophers to conclude that "essentially disputed concepts" would have been far better choice for Gallie's meaning, for at least three reasons:

1. Gallie's term has led many to the mistaken belief that he spoke of hotly disputed, rather than essentially disputed concepts.
2. Expressly stipulating that a specific issue can never be resolved, and then calling it a "contest" seems both absurd and misleading.
3. Any assertion that "essentially contested" concepts are incommensurable made at the same time as an assertion that "they have any common subject-matter" is incoherent; and, also, it reveals an "inconsistency in the idea of essential contestability".

Jeremy Waldron's research has revealed that Gallie's notion has "run wild" in the law review literature over the ensuing 60 years and is, now, being widely used to denote something like "very hotly contested, with no resolution in sight", due to an entirely mistaken view that the essential in Gallie's term is an "intensifier", when, in fact, "[Gallie's] term 'essential' refers to the location of the disagreement or indeterminacy; it is contestation at the core, not just at the borderlines or penumbra of a concept". Yet, according to Gallie, is also clear that:

if the notion of logical justification can be applied only to such theses and arguments as can be presumed capable of gaining in the long run universal agreement, the disputes to which the uses of any essentially contested concept give rise are not genuine or rational disputes at all. ... So long as contestant users of any essentially contested concept believe, however deludedly, that their own use of it is the only one that can command honest and informed approval, they are likely to persist in the hope that they will ultimately persuade and convert all their opponents by logical means. But once [we] let the truth out of the bag — i.e., the essential contestedness of the concept in question — then this harmless if deluded hope may well be replaced by a ruthless decision to cut the cackle, to damn the heretics and to exterminate the unwanted.

== See also ==
- Ambiguity – Type of uncertainty of meaning where several interpretations are possible
- Concept creep – Expansion of a concept to the point of meaninglessness
- Demonstrative – Words indicating which object is being referred to
- Fact–value distinction – Distinction between what is and what ought to be
- Floating signifier – Signifier without a definite referent
- Fuzzy concept – Varying application boundaries
- Ideograph (rhetoric) – Type of word in political discourse
- Indexicality – Sign pointing to or indexing an object in its context
- Meaning (philosophy) – Philosophical conception of meaning
- Natural kind – Concept in the philosophy of science
- Vagueness – Property of predicates in linguistics and philosophy
- What Is Art? – 1898 book by Leo Tolstoy
