= Wooden language =

Language used to divert attention

Wooden language is language that uses vague, ambiguous, abstract or pompous words in order to divert attention from salient issues. The phrase is a literal translation of the French expression langue de bois which appears to have been coined by Georges Clemenceau in 1919, and became widely used during the 1970s and 1980s after being brought back into French from Russian via Polish.

== Key characteristics ==
The French scholar Françoise Thom identified four characteristics of wooden language: abstraction and the avoidance of the concrete, tautologies, bad metaphors, and Manichaeism that divides the world into good and evil.

In France, wooden language is commonly and strongly associated with politicians and the conditioning at the elite École nationale d'administration, as attested by intellectual Michel Butor: "We have had, among the misfortunes of France, the creation by General de Gaulle of the École nationale d'administration which holds the monopoly of the training of politicians. They have to go through there, where they learn the wooden language".

== In popular culture ==
The fictional language of Newspeak in George Orwell's novel Nineteen Eighty-Four often mirrors and satirizes wooden language.

== See also ==
- If-by-whiskey
- Officialese
- Weasel word
