= Robert Hariman =

American scholar

Robert Hariman (born June 17, 1951) is an American scholar of rhetoric and public culture. He received his BA from Macalester College in 1973, and received his MA in 1975 and PhD in 1979 from the University of Minnesota. He was a member of the faculty at Drake University from 1979 to 2004, and since then has been a professor in the Department of Communication Studies at Northwestern University. He also served as department chair at both institutions.

== Research/Scholarship ==
Hariman’s scholarship focuses on political judgment, public culture, the history of rhetoric, and the role of photography in liberal-democratic societies. His publications span several disciplines and include translations in French and Chinese. His editorial work includes co-editing Studies in Rhetoric and Culture (Berghahn). Hariman also co-created “No Caption Needed,” a blog dedicated to photojournalism, politics, and culture, which he writes with John Lucaites. His collaboration with Lucaites also includes two books: No Caption Needed and The Public Image.

== Publications ==
Books:

- Popular Trials: Rhetoric, Mass Media, and the Law (1990)
- Post-Realism: The Rhetorical Turn in International Relations (1996), co-edited with Francis A. Beer
- Prudence: Classical Virtue, Postmodern Practice (2003)
- Political Style: The Artistry of Power (1995), translated into French by Laurent Bury, Le Pouvoir est une question de style: Rhétoriques du politique (2009)
- No Caption Needed: Iconic Photographs, Public Culture, and Liberal Democracy (2007), co-authored with John Louis Lucaites
- Culture, Catastrophe, and Rhetoric: The Texture of Political Action (2015), Studies in Rhetoric Culture, vol. 7, co-edited with Ralph Cintron
- The Public Image: Photography and Civic Spectatorship (2016), co-authored with John Louis Lucaites

Selected Essays:

- “Political Parody and Public Culture,” Quarterly Journal of Speech 94.3 (2008): 247-272
- Seeing the Stranger in the Mirror: Everyday Life in Magnum’s Public World,” in Reading Magnum: A Visual Archive of the Modern World, edited by Steven Hoelscher (Austin: University of Texas Press, 2013), 246-265
- “What is a Chiasmus? Or, Why the Abyss Stares Back,” in Chiasmus and Culture, edited by Boris Wiseman and Anthony Paul (Oxford: Berghahn Books, 2014), 45-68
- “Watching War Evolve: Photojournalism and New Forms of Violence,” in The Violence of the Image: Photography and International Conflict, edited by Liam Kennedy and Caitlin Patrick (London: I.B. Tauris, 2104), 139-163

Blog:

- www.nocaptionneeded.com, co-authored with John Lucaites (Included in “10 of the Best Photo Blogs,” British Journal of Photography); cross-posts periodically at Reading The Pictures
