= Celeste Condit =

American scholar (born 1956)

- Born: Celeste Michelle Condit; October 26, 1956 (age 69); Pocatello, Idaho
- Education: Idaho State University; University of Iowa
- Scientific career
- Fields: Communication studies
- Institutions: University of Georgia
- Thesis: The Contemporary American Abortion Controversy: A Study of Public Argumentation (1982)

Celeste Michelle Condit (born October 26, 1956) is an American professor and scholar of rhetorical criticism. Her work focuses on the rhetoric of racism, biology, the human genome, and feminism. In 2018, the Public Address Conference described Condit as "a pioneer in understanding and improving public communication about genetics." She currently holds the role of Distinguished Research Professor at the University of Georgia.

== Early life and education ==
Condit attended Idaho State University where she studied Speech (now Communication, Media and Persuasion). Graduating in 1977 with highest honors, Condit then enrolled in the University of Iowa's Speech Communication Department, where she received both her M.A. (1980) and Ph.D. (1982) in Rhetorical Studies.

== Career ==
Following graduation from the University of Iowa, Condit was hired at Tulane University, where she served as an assistant professor from 1982 to 1985. She was then hired by the University of Georgia in 1985, where she continues to teach and research today.

She was awarded a full professorship in 1994, with a research agenda focused on discourses of science and biology, including genetics and their relationship with social change and stability. As a result of her interdisciplinary research, Condit has been published in several journals from various disciplines such as rhetoric, communication, genetics, medicine, science, and women's studies. Condit has presented her research at the National Communication Association (NCA) and the Association for the Rhetoric of Science, Technology and Medicine (ARSTM).

She is the author of several books and over 100 journal articles. Condit has also co-edited three volumes, and she is currently working on her fourth book, 9/11s Angry Public Rhetorics: The Role of Emotion in Global Relations. From 1998 to 2001 she served as co-editor of Women's Studies in Communication, along with feminist scholar Bonnie J. Dow.

As a professor, Condit currently teaches undergraduate courses in Science Communication, Communication in Government, and Rhetoric and Society. She also leads graduate seminars in Burkean Theory, Rhetorical Theory, and the Rhetoric of Economics. She has received teaching awards, such as: the Faculty Excellence Award (2006; 2014) and the Lothar Tresp Outstanding Honors Professor (2001).

== Bibliography ==
- Decoding Abortion Rhetoric (1990)
- Crafting Equality: America's Anglo-African Word (1993, with John Louis Lucaites)
- The Meanings of the Gene: Public Debates about Heredity (1999)
- 9/11s Angry Public Rhetorics: The Role of Emotion in Global Relations (TBA)
