= Apposition =

Modifying noun phrases by placing them next to each other

Apposition is a grammatical construction in which two elements, normally noun phrases, are placed side by side so one element identifies the other in a different way. The two elements are said to be "in apposition", and the element identifying the other is called the appositive. The identification of an appositive requires consideration of how the elements are used in a sentence.

For example, in these sentences, the phrases Alice Smith and my sister are in apposition, with the appositive identified with italics:

- My sister, Alice Smith, likes jelly beans.
- Alice Smith, my sister, likes jelly beans.

Traditionally, appositives were called by their Latin name appositio, derived from the Latin ad ("near") and positio ("placement"), although the English form is now more commonly used.

Apposition is a figure of speech of the scheme type and often results when the verbs (particularly verbs of being) in supporting clauses are eliminated to produce shorter descriptive phrases. That makes them often function as hyperbatons, or figures of disorder, because they can disrupt the flow of a sentence. For example, in the phrase "My wife, a surgeon by training, ..." it is necessary to pause before the parenthetical modification "a surgeon by training".

== Restrictive versus non-restrictive ==
A restrictive appositive provides information essential to identifying the phrase in apposition. It limits or clarifies that phrase in some crucial way, such that the meaning of the sentence would change if the appositive were removed. In English, restrictive appositives are not set off by commas. The sentences below use restrictive appositives. Here and elsewhere in this section, the relevant phrases are marked as the appositive phrase^{A} or the phrase in apposition^{P}.

- My friend^{P} Alice Smith^{A} likes jelly beans. – I have many friends, but I am restricting my statement to the one named Alice Smith.
- He likes the television show^{P} The Simpsons^{A}. – There are many television shows, and he likes that particular one.

A non-restrictive appositive provides information not critical to identifying the phrase in apposition. It provides non-essential information, and the essential meaning of the sentence would not change if the appositive were removed. In English, non-restrictive appositives are typically set off by commas. The sentences below use non-restrictive appositives.

- Alice Smith^{P}, my friend^{A}, likes jelly beans. – The fact that Alice is my friend is not necessary to identify her.
- I visited Canada^{P}, a beautiful country^{A}. – The appositive (that it is beautiful) is not needed to identify Canada.
- The first to arrive at the house^{A}, she^{P} unlocked the front door.

The same phrase can be a restrictive appositive in one context and a non-restrictive appositive in another:

- My brother^{P} Nathan^{A} is here. – Restrictive: I have several brothers, and the one named Nathan is here.
- My brother^{P}, Nathan^{A}, is here. – Non-restrictive: I have only one brother and, as an aside, his name is Nathan.

If there is any doubt that the appositive is non-restrictive, it is safer to use the restrictive punctuation. In the example above, the restrictive first sentence is still correct even if there is only one brother.

A relative clause is not always an appositive.

- My sister^{P}, Alice Smith^{A}, likes jelly beans. – The appositive is the noun phrase Alice Smith.
- My sister^{P}, a doctor whose name is Alice Smith^{A}, likes jelly beans. – The appositive is the noun phrase with dependent relative clause a doctor whose name is Alice Smith.
- My sister, whose name is Alice Smith, likes jelly beans. – There is no appositive. There is a relative clause: whose name is Alice Smith.

Example using zero article:

- The English writer Agatha Christie^{P}, author of nearly a hundred mystery novels and stories^{A}, was born in 1891.

== Examples ==
In the following examples, the appositive phrases are shown in italics:

- I was born in Finland, the land of a thousand lakes. – Appositives are not limited to describing people.
- Barry Goldwater, the junior senator from Arizona, received the Republican nomination in 1964. – Clarifies who Barry Goldwater is.
- Ren and Stimpy, both friends of mine, are starting a band. – Provides context on my relation to Ren and Stimpy.
- Alexander the Great, the Macedonian conqueror of Persia, was one of the most successful military commanders of the ancient world. – Substantiates the sentence's predicate.
- Aretha Franklin, a very popular singer, will be performing at the White House. – Explains why Aretha Franklin is performing at that venue.
- You are better than anyone, anyone I've ever met. – Provides additional strength to the phrase.
- A staunch supporter of democracy, Ann campaigned against the king's authoritarian rule. – Indicates the reason for Ann's actions.

A false title is a kind of restrictive appositive, as in "Noted biologist Jane Smith has arrived". Here the phrase noted biologist appears without an article as if it were a title. The grammatical correctness of false titles is controversial.

Appositive phrases can also serve as definitions:

- No one – not a single person – should ever suffer that way. – Emphatic semantic duplication.

== Appositive genitive ==
In several languages, the same syntax that is used to express such relations as possession can also be used appositively:

- In English:
  - "Appositive oblique", a prepositional phrase with of as in: the month of December, the sin of pride, or the city of New York. That has also been invoked as an explanation for the double genitive: a friend of mine.
  - The ending -'s as in In Dublin's Fair City, which is uncommon.
- In Classical Greek:
  - "Genitive of explanation" as in Greek: ὑὸς μέγα χρῆμα, romanized: hyòs méga chrêma, "a monster (great affair) of a boar" (Histories of Herodotus, 1.36), where ὑὸς, the word for boar is inflected for the genitive singular
- In Japanese:
  - Postpositive no as in: Japanese: ふじの山, romanized: Fuji no Yama, lit. 'the Mountain of Fuji' and Japanese: となりのトトロ, romanized: Tonari no Totoro, lit. 'Neighbor Totoro', 'My Neighbor Totoro'
- In Biblical Hebrew:
  - Construct, "genitive of association" as in: Hebrew: גַּן עֵדֶן, romanized: Gan 'Ēden, "the Garden of Eden"

== See also ==
- Literary device
- Parenthesis (rhetoric)
