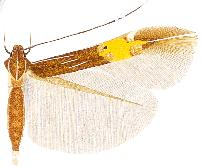

Scientific classification
- Kingdom: Animalia
- Phylum: Arthropoda
- Clade: Pancrustacea
- Class: Insecta
- Order: Lepidoptera
- Family: Cosmopterigidae
- Genus: Cosmopterix
- Species: C. pimmaarteni

Binomial name
- Cosmopterix pimmaarteni Koster, 2010

= Cosmopterix pimmaarteni =

Species of moth

Cosmopterix pimmaarteni is a moth of the family Cosmopterigidae. It is known from the Federal District of Brazil.

Adults have been recorded in May, June, April, September and December, indicating more than one generation.

== Description ==
Male, female. Forewing length 3.7 mm. Head: frons shining greyish white, vertex and neck tufts shining dark bronze brown with reddish reflection, laterally and medially lined white, collar shining bronze brown; labial palpus first segment very short, white, second segment three-quarters of the length of third, dark brown with white longitudinal lines laterally and ventrally, third segment white, lined dark brown laterally, extreme apex white; scape dorsally shining dark bronze brown with a white anterior line, ventrally shining white, antenna shining dark brown with a white line from base to one-third, followed by an interrupted white line to one-half, followed towards apex by six dark brown segments, two white, two dark brown, two white, ten dark brown and seven white segments at apex. Thorax and tegulae shining bronze brown with reddish gloss, thorax with a white median line, tegulae lined white inwardly. Legs: shining dark greyish brown, femora ochreous-grey, foreleg with a white longitudinal line on tibia and tarsal segments one to three and five, tibia of midleg leg with white oblique basal and medial lines and a white apical ring, tarsal segments one to three and five with white apical rings, tibia of hindleg as midleg, tarsal segment one with white basal and apical rings, segments two and three with white apical rings, segments four and five dorsally white, spurs white dorsally, dark greyish brown ventrally. Forewing shining dark bronze brown with reddish gloss, five narrow white lines in the basal area, a costal from one-third to the transverse fascia, a subcostal from base to one-third, slightly bending from costa, a short medial just above fold, from one-fifth to just beyond the end of the subcostal, a subdorsal as long as the medial but slightly further from base, a dorsal from beyond base to one-quarter, a bright yellow transverse fascia beyond the middle, slightly narrowed towards dorsum on the inner edge and with an apical protrusion, bordered at the inner edge by two tubercular golden metallic subcostal and a subdorsal spots the subdorsal spot slightly further from base as the subdorsal, the subcostal spot with a small patch of blackish scales on the outside, bordered on the outer edge by a tubercular golden metallic costal and dorsal spot, the dorsal spot about three times as large as the costal, both spots with some dark bronze brown inward lining, the transverse fascia narrowly edged grey at costa, a white costal streak from the outer costal spot, a white apical line from the apical protrusion to apex, cilia dark bronze brown, paler towards dorsum. Hindwing shining brownish grey, cilia bronze brown. Underside: forewing shining greyish brown, the white costal streak distinctly visible, hindwing shining greyish brown in the costal half, shining grey in the dorsal half. Abdomen dorsally bronze brown with reddish gloss, ventrally shining dark grey, in the middle yellowish white, segments banded shining white posteriorly, anal tuft white, pale grey basally.

== Etymology ==
The species is dedicated to the grandson of the author, Pim Maarten Koster.
