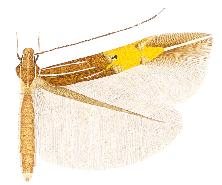

Scientific classification
- Kingdom: Animalia
- Phylum: Arthropoda
- Clade: Pancrustacea
- Class: Insecta
- Order: Lepidoptera
- Family: Cosmopterigidae
- Genus: Cosmopterix
- Species: C. dapifera

Binomial name
- Cosmopterix dapifera Hodges, 1962

= Cosmopterix dapifera =

Species of moth

Cosmopterix dapifera is a moth of the family Cosmopterigidae. It is known from the United States (from Tennessee and north-western Arkansas south to central Florida and south-central Arizona), Brazil (Bahia) and Cuba.

Adults have been collected from July to September, and in January, indicating more than one generation.

== Description ==
Male, female. Forewing length 3.6–3.8 mm. Head: frons shining ochreous-white with greenish reflection, vertex and neck tufts greyish brown with greenish and reddish gloss, lined white medially and laterally, collar greyish brown; labial palpus first segment very short, white, second segment three-quarters of the length of third, greyish brown with white longitudinal lines laterally and ventrally, third segment white, lined brown laterally, extreme apex white; scape dorsally dark brown with a white anterior line, ventrally white, antenna dark brown with a very short white line at base, in middle a short, partly annulate, section, followed towards apex by four dark brown segments, two white, two dark brown, two white, ten dark brown, six white and one dark brown segment at apex. Thorax and tegulae greyish brown, thorax with a white median line and tegulae lined white inwardly and outwardly. Legs: greyish brown, femur of hindleg shining ochreous-white, foreleg with a white line on tibia and tarsal segments one to three and five, tibia of midleg with white oblique basal and medial lines and a white apical ring, tarsal segments as foreleg, tibia of hindleg with a very oblique white basal line, the medial line almost from base to the mid-spur, from there very oblique to two-thirds, a yellowish white subapical streak and a white apical ring, tarsal segment one white at base and dorsally in apical half, remaining segments dorsally white, spurs white dorsally, greyish brown ventrally. Forewing shining greyish brown with some reddish gloss, four white lines in the basal area, a subcostal from base to one-third, very slightly bending from costa, a medial from base to beyond the subcostal, not reaching the transverse fascia, a subdorsal from one-quarter to near the transverse fascia, a dorsal from base to or beyond start of the subdorsal, a yellow transverse fascia beyond the middle with a narrow basal protrusion in the middle and with a broad prolongation towards apex, bordered at the inner edge by two tubercular pale golden metallic subcostal and subdorsal spots, the subcostal spot slightly more towards base and with a patch of blackish scales on outside, at two-thirds of the transverse fascia two tubercular pale golden costal and dorsal spots of equal size and opposite, both inwardly edged greyish brown, an indistinct whitish costal streak from the outer costal spot, a broad shining white apical line from the middle of the prolongation of the transverse fascia, cilia greyish brown at apex, ochreous-grey towards dorsum. Hindwing brownish grey, cilia ochreous-grey. Underside: forewing shining pale brownish grey, white apical line distinctly visible, hindwing pale grey. Abdomen dorsally shining ochreous-brown with reddish gloss, ventrally shining white, anal tuft white.
