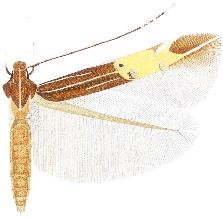

Scientific classification
- Kingdom: Animalia
- Phylum: Arthropoda
- Class: Insecta
- Order: Lepidoptera
- Family: Cosmopterigidae
- Genus: Cosmopterix
- Species: C. diaphora

Binomial name
- Cosmopterix diaphora Walsingham, 1909

= Cosmopterix diaphora =

Species of moth

Cosmopterix diaphora is a moth of the family Cosmopterigidae. It is known from the Federal District of Brazil and the states of Guerrero and Veracruz in Mexico.

Adults have been collected in April and August, which indicates two generations.

== Description ==
Male, female. Forewing length 3.8-4.0 mm. Head: frons shining ochreous-white with greenish and reddish reflections, vertex and neck tufts shining dark greyish brown with reddish gloss, lined white laterally and medially, collar shining dark greyish brown; labial palpus first segment very short, white, second segment three-quarters of the length of third, dark brown with white longitudinal lines laterally and ventrally, third segment white, lined brown laterally, extreme apex white; scape dorsally shining dark brown with a white anterior line, ventrally shining white; antenna shining dark brown with a white line from base to one-half, in apical half two white rings of two segments separated by two dark brown segments, followed towards apex by six dark brown and eight white segments at apex. Thorax and tegulae shining dark greyish brown with reddish gloss, thorax with a white median line.

Legs: shining dark greyish brown, foreleg with a white line on tibia and tarsal segments, tibia of midleg with white oblique basal and medial lines and a white apical ring, tarsal segment one, two and four with whitish apical rings, segment five entirely white, tibia of hindleg with a very oblique white line from base to two-thirds and a white apical ring, tarsal segment one with white basal and apical rings, segments two to four with white apical rings and segment five entirely white, spurs white dorsally, brown ventrally.

Forewing shining dark greyish brown with reddish gloss, five narrow white lines in the basal area, a short costal from one-third to the transverse fascia, a subcostal from base to one-third, distally slightly bending from costa, a medial above fold, from base to the transverse fascia, a subdorsal from one-third to near the transverse fascia, a dorsal from base to the start of the subdorsal, a bright yellow transverse fascia beyond the middle with a broad prolongation towards apex, bordered at the inner edge by a tubercular pale golden metallic subcostal spot with a patch of blackish scales on outside, and a similarly coloured but slightly larger subdorsal spot.

Further from base than the subcostal and not at the inner edge of the transverse fascia, inwardly edged by brownish and blackish scales, at two-thirds of the transverse fascia a small tubercular pale golden costal spot, opposite the costal spot, a similarly coloured but more than twice as large dorsal spot, a white costal streak from the outer costal spot to apex, a shining white apical line from the transverse fascia to apex, cilia dark brown at apex, ochreous-brown towards dorsum. Hindwing shining brownish grey, cilia ochreous-brown. Underside: forewing shining brownish grey, white apical line visible in the cilia, hindwing shining pale grey. Abdomen dorsally shining yellowish brown with reddish gloss, segment six banded whitish posteriorly, ventrally shining white, anal tuft ochreous.
