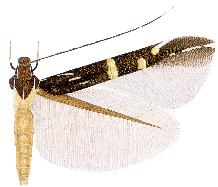

Scientific classification
- Kingdom: Animalia
- Phylum: Arthropoda
- Clade: Pancrustacea
- Class: Insecta
- Order: Lepidoptera
- Family: Cosmopterigidae
- Genus: Cosmopterix
- Species: C. lummyae

Binomial name
- Cosmopterix lummyae Koster, 2010

= Cosmopterix lummyae =

Species of moth

Cosmopterix lummyae is a moth of the family Cosmopterigidae. It is known from the Federal District of Brazil and from Colombia.

Adults have been recorded in March and from May to August.

== Description ==
Male, female. Forewing length 3.3-4.2 mm. Head: frons shining greyish white with reddish reflection, vertex and neck tufts shining bronze brown with reddish reflection, laterally lined white, collar shining dark brown; labial palpus, first segment very short, greyish white, second segment three-quarters of the length of third, dark brown with white longitudinal lines laterally and ventrally, third segment white, lined brown laterally; scape dorsally dark brown with a white anterior line, ventrally creamy white, antenna shining dark brown, a white interrupted line from base to three-quarters with a short uninterrupted section at base, this line interrupted in middle of antenna by three brown segments, followed towards apex by respectively three brown, one white, eleven brown and eight white segments at apex, greyish towards tip. Thorax and tegulae shining dark brown with reddish gloss, thorax with a narrow white median line, tegulae lined white inwardly. Legs: shining dark brown, foreleg with a white line on tibia and tarsal segments one, two and five, tibia of midleg with white oblique basal and medial lines and a white apical ring, tarsal segment one lined white on the outside, segments two and five each with a white apical spot, tibia of hindleg with a silver metallic basal streak and an oblique medial line, both with strong bluish reflection, and a white apical ring, tarsal segments one to three with indistinct white dorsal spots apically, segments four and five dorsally white, spurs dark brown, inner side whitish. Forewing shining dark brown with reddish gloss, three short silver streaks with bluish reflection in the basal area, a subcostal from base to one-quarter, interrupted in the middle and bending from costa distally, a short medial above fold, underneath the end of the subcostal, a subdorsal about as long as the medial and half its length further from base, a broad tubercular pale golden metallic fascia with greenish and purplish reflections in the middle, perpendicular on dorsum, at three-fifths a tubercular pale golden metallic dorsal spot, a similar but smaller costal spot at three-quarters, the costal spot edged by a narrow white costal streak, apical line as an interrupted silver metallic streak with bluish reflection and a broad white spot in the cilia at apex, cilia dark brown. Hindwing shining dark brown, cilia dark brown. Underside: forewing shining dark brown with white costal streak and apical line distinctly visible, hindwing dark brown. Abdomen dorsally shining brown, segments banded shining dark grey posteriorly, ventrally dark brown, segments broadly banded shining greyish white posteriorly, anal tuft dark greyish brown.

== Etymology ==
The species is named after the sister-in-law of the author, Lummy Koster, who translated the papers written in Spanish for him.
