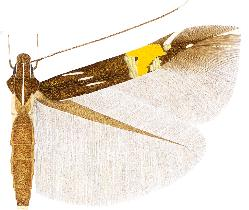

Scientific classification
- Kingdom: Animalia
- Phylum: Arthropoda
- Clade: Pancrustacea
- Class: Insecta
- Order: Lepidoptera
- Family: Cosmopterigidae
- Genus: Cosmopterix
- Species: C. bacata

Binomial name
- Cosmopterix bacata Hodges, 1962

= Cosmopterix bacata =

Species of moth

Cosmopterix bacata is a moth of the family Cosmopterigidae. It is found in the United States from northern Florida to southwest Alabama south to central Florida and Louisiana.

Adults have been collected from late April and mid-July.

== Description ==
Male, female. Forewing length 3.9-5.0 mm. Head: frons shining bronze with greenish and reddish reflections, vertex and neck tufts shining dark brown with reddish gloss, laterally and medially lined white, collar shining dark brown; labial palpus first segment very short, shining ochreous, second segment about three-quarters of the length of third, dorsally shining pale grey, ventrally and apically dark brown, third segment white, lined dark brown laterally; scape dorsally shining dark brown with a white anterior line, shining white ventrally, antenna shining dark brown, a short white line at base, often partly interrupted in distal half and with a white section of 14-17 segments at apex. Thorax and tegulae shining dark brown with reddish gloss, thorax with a white median line. Legs: shining dark brown with reddish gloss, femora of midleg and hindleg shining golden brown, foreleg with a white line on tibia and tarsal segments one, two and five, tibia of midleg with a white oblique basal line, a very indistinct pale brown oblique medial line and a white apical ring, tarsal segments one and two with white apical rings, segment five entirely white, tibia of hindleg as midleg, but the oblique medial line white and distinct, tarsal segment one with a white apical ring, other segments missing, spurs ochreous-white dorsally, dark grey ventrally. Forewing shining dark brown with reddish gloss, four white lines in the basal area, a subcostal from one-tenth to one-quarter, gradually bending from costa, a very short medial, ending just beyond the subcostal, a subdorsal, about three times as long as the medial but ending well beyond it, a short and narrow dorsal from beyond base to one-fifth, a broad dark yellow transverse fascia beyond the middle, narrowing towards dorsum, inwardly edged by a broad tubercular silver to pale golden metallic fascia, outwardly edged by two tubercular silver to pale golden metallic costal and dorsal spots, the dorsal spot about three times as large as the costal and much closer to base, both spots narrowly edged dark brown inwardly, the costal outwardly edged by a white costal streak, a silvery white apical line from the middle of the apical area, often broadly interrupted; cilia dark brown around apex, paler on dorsum towards base. Hindwing shining dark greyish brown, cilia pale brown. Underside: forewing shining dark greyish brown, the white costal streak and the white apical spot of the apical line distinctly visible, hindwing shining dark greyish brown. Abdomen dorsally shining dark brown, ventrally shining grey, segments banded shining white posteriorly, anal tuft ochreous-grey.
