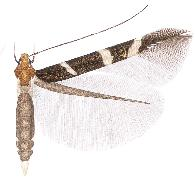

Scientific classification
- Kingdom: Animalia
- Phylum: Arthropoda
- Clade: Pancrustacea
- Class: Insecta
- Order: Lepidoptera
- Family: Cosmopterigidae
- Genus: Cosmopterix
- Species: C. trifasciella

Binomial name
- Cosmopterix trifasciella Koster, 2010

= Cosmopterix trifasciella =

Species of moth

Cosmopterix trifasciella is a moth of the family Cosmopterigidae. It is known from Ecuador.

Adults have been recorded in June.

== Description ==
Male, female. Forewing length 2.9-3.3 mm. Head: frons shining greyish white with golden reflection, vertex and neck tufts shining dark bronze brown with golden reflection, laterally lined white, collar shining dark bronze brown; labial palpus first segment very short, white, second segment three-quarters of the length of third, dark brown with white longitudinal lines laterally and ventrally, third segment white, lined dark brown laterally; scape dorsally dark brown with a white anterior line, ventrally white, antenna shining dark brown, very vaguely annulate in middle. Thorax and tegulae shining dark bronze brown with golden reflection and reddish gloss. Legs: shining dark brown, femora of midleg and hindleg shining golden brown, foreleg with a white line on tibia and tarsal segments one and two, tibia of midleg with silver metallic oblique basal and medial lines with greenish reflection and a white apical ring, tarsal segments one, two and four with white apical rings, segment five entirely white, tibia of hindleg with silver metallic medial and subapical rings with greenish reflections and a white apical ring, tarsal segments one and two with silver metallic dorsal spots and apical rings, segments three and four with white apical rings and segment five entirely white, spurs shining dark brown, lined silver metallic. Forewing shining dark brown with reddish gloss, at one-fifth an irregular inwardly oblique silver to very pale golden metallic fascia, not reaching dorsum, a broad tubercular silver to very pale golden metallic fascia before one-half, perpendicular at dorsum and slightly bending toward base at costa, at three-fifths a tubercular silver to very pale golden outwardly oblique fascia, at costa edged by a short and broad white costal streak, between these last two fasciae, some yellow scales at dorsum, all three fasciae with strong violet reflection, the apical line as three silver metallic streaks with bluish reflection in the middle of the apical area and a narrow white line in the apical cilia, cilia dark brown, paler on dorsum towards base. Hindwing shining dark greyish brown, cilia dark brown. Underside: forewing shining dark brown with the white costal streak indistinctly and the white apical line distinctly visible, hindwing dark greyish brown. Abdomen dorsally shining dark brown with reddish gloss, laterally with golden reflection, ventrally dark brown with strong golden reflection, segments broadly banded shining white posteriorly, anal tuft large, shining golden grey, dark grey in female.

== Etymology ==
The name of the species, trifasciella, refers to the three silver to pale golden fasciae on the forewing.
