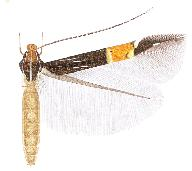

Scientific classification
- Kingdom: Animalia
- Phylum: Arthropoda
- Class: Insecta
- Order: Lepidoptera
- Family: Cosmopterigidae
- Genus: Cosmopterix
- Species: C. thrasyzela

Binomial name
- Cosmopterix thrasyzela Meyrick, 1915

= Cosmopterix thrasyzela =

Species of moth

Cosmopterix thrasyzela is a moth of the family Cosmopterigidae. It is known from Brazil (Amazonas, Pará) and Guyana.

Adults have been recorded in February and August.

== Description ==
Male, female. Forewing length 2.7-3.1 mm. Head: frons shining greyish white, vertex and neck tufts shining dark bronze brown, laterally and medially lined white, collar shining dark bronze brown; labial palpus first segment very short, white, second segment four-fifths of the length of third, dark brown with white longitudinal lines laterally and ventrally, third segment white, lined dark brown laterally; scape dorsally shining brown with a white anterior line, ventrally shining white, antenna shining dark brown with a white line from base to three-fifths, sometimes interrupted distally, followed towards apex by approximately nine dark brown segments, two white, ten dark brown and seven white segments at apex. Thorax shining dark brown with white median line, tegulae shining dark brown, lined white inwardly. Legs: shining dark brown, femora of midleg and hindleg shining golden, foreleg with a white line on tibia and tarsal segments, tibia of midleg with a silvery white oblique basal streak and white medial and apical rings, tarsal segments with indistinct white apical rings, tarsal segment five entirely whitish, tibia of hindleg as midleg, spurs white dorsally, brownish ventrally. Forewing shining dark brown with reddish gloss, four short and narrow white lines in the basal area, a subcostal from one-eighth to one-quarter, a very short and narrow second subcostal just inward of the transverse fascia, a medial from one-fifth to one-third, a subdorsal also from one-fifth, but slightly longer than the medial, a bright yellowish orange transverse fascia beyond the middle, narrowing towards dorsum on the outer edge, bordered at the inner edge by a tubercular pale golden metallic fascia with a small subcostal patch of blackish scales on the outside, bordered at the outer edge by two tubercular pale golden metallic costal and dorsal spots, the dorsal spot about twice as large as the costal and more towards base, both spots with an irregular dark brown inward lining, a white costal streak from the costal spot, the apical line as a silvery white spot in the middle of the apical area and a white streak in apical cilia, cilia dark brown, paler towards dorsum. Hindwing shining dark brownish grey, cilia dark brown. Underside: forewing shining dark greyish brown, hindwing shining dark greyish brown. Abdomen dorsally ochreous brown with greenish and purplish reflections, ventrally shining dark grey with golden gloss, segments banded ochreous white posteriorly, anal tuft dark greyish brown.
