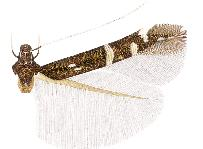

Scientific classification
- Kingdom: Animalia
- Phylum: Arthropoda
- Clade: Pancrustacea
- Class: Insecta
- Order: Lepidoptera
- Family: Cosmopterigidae
- Genus: Cosmopterix
- Species: C. amalthea

Binomial name
- Cosmopterix amalthea Koster, 2010

= Cosmopterix amalthea =

Species of moth from Cuba

Cosmopterix amalthea is a moth of the family Cosmopterigidae. It is known from Cuba.

Adults were collected in July.

== Description ==
Male. Forewing length 3.5 mm. Head: frons shining greyish white with greenish and reddish reflections, vertex and neck tufts shining bronze brown with greenish and reddish reflections, laterally and medially lined white, collar shining bronze brown with greenish and reddish reflections; labial palpus, first segment very short, white, second segment three-quarters of the length of third, dark brown with white longitudinal lines laterally and ventrally, third segment white, brown lined laterally; scape dorsally dark brown with a white anterior line, ventrally white; antenna missing. Thorax and tegulae shining dark brown with reddish gloss, thorax with a white median line in posterior half. Legs: shining dark brown, femora shining greyish brown, foreleg with a white line on tibia and tarsal segments one, two, four and five, tibiae of midleg and hindleg with a silver metallic longitudinal line with strong bluish reflection from base to one-third, tibia of midleg with an oblique white medial streak and white apical ring, tibia of hindleg as midleg but with an additional broad white subapical ring, tarsal segments of midleg with white apical rings on segments one, two, four and five, segments one and two also with a thin white longitudinal line laterally on outside, tarsal segments of hindleg with white apical rings on segments one, two and four, segment five entirely white, spurs dark brown, paler towards apex. Forewing shining dark brown with reddish gloss, at one-fifth two very short silver streaks, a medial just above fold, a subdorsal below fold and further from base than the medial, a broad tubercular silver metallic fascia at one-half, perpendicular on dorsum and with purplish reflection, on dorsum at three-fifths, a tubercular silver metallic spot with purplish reflection, between the fascia and the dorsal spot a few yellow scales above dorsum, a tubercular silver metallic subcostal spot at three-quarters, outwardly edged by a narrow white costal streak, apical line as a short silver metallic streak with strong bluish reflection in middle of the apical area and a shining white spot in the cilia at apex, cilia dark brown, paler on dorsum towards base. Hindwing shining greyish brown, cilia greyish brown. Underside: forewing shining greyish brown with reddish gloss and with the white costal streak and apical line distinctly visible, hindwing greyish brown, a short whitish streak on dorsum at base. Abdomen too greased to describe.
