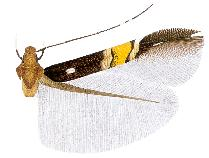

Scientific classification
- Kingdom: Animalia
- Phylum: Arthropoda
- Class: Insecta
- Order: Lepidoptera
- Family: Cosmopterigidae
- Genus: Cosmopterix
- Species: C. pyrozela

Binomial name
- Cosmopterix pyrozela Meyrick, 1922

= Cosmopterix pyrozela =

Species of moth

Cosmopterix pyrozela is a moth of the family Cosmopterigidae. It is known from Amazonas, Brazil.

Adults have been recorded in April.

== Description ==
Female. Forewing length 3.7 mm. Head: shining greyish ochreous with greenish gloss, vertex, neck tufts and collar greyish brown; labial palpus, first segment very short, white, second segment three-quarters of the length of third, dark grey with white longitudinal lines laterally and ventrally, third segment white, lined dark grey laterally, extreme apex white; scape dark brown with a white anterior line, ventrally white, antenna dark brown with a white interrupted line from base to one-half, at two-thirds a white ring of three segments followed by two dark brown and two white segments, remaining part towards the apex of approximately 18 segments dark brown. Thorax and tegulae are greyish brown. Legs: dark brown, foreleg with a white line on the tibia and tarsal segments, tibia of midleg with oblique white basal and medial lines and a white apical ring, tarsal segments one, two and four apically white, segment five entirely white, hindlegs missing, spurs whitish dorsally, grey ventrally. Forewing shining dark brown, at one-quarter a violet silver metallic spot on the fold in the middle of the basal area, an orange-yellow transverse fascia beyond the middle, slightly outwardly oblique, bordered at the inner edge by an outwardly oblique pale golden metallic fascia with violet reflection and edged dark brown on the outside, bordered on the outer edge by a more outward oblique pale golden metallic fascia with violet reflection, edged dark brown on the inside, the outer fascia edged on costa by a white costal streak, the apical line as a silver violet streak in the middle of the apical area and a white spot in the cilia at apex, cilia dark brown around apex, paler towards base, hindwing dark greyish brown, cilia greyish brown. Underside: forewing shining greyish brown with the yellowish white costal streak and white spot at apex visible, hindwing costal half greyish brown, dorsal half grey.
