= Cosmopterix ancistraea =

Scientific classification
- Kingdom: Animalia
- Phylum: Arthropoda
- Class: Insecta
- Order: Lepidoptera
- Family: Cosmopterigidae
- Genus: Cosmopterix
- Species: C. ancistraea

Binomial name
- Cosmopterix ancistraea Meyrick, 1913

Species of moth from South Africa

Cosmopterix ancistraea is a moth in the family Cosmopterigidae. It was described by Edward Meyrick in 1913. It is found in South Africa.

The wingspan is about 10 mm (0.39 in). The forewings are bronzy blackish with a silvery-white subcostal line from the base, not nearly reaching the band, inclined downwards posteriorly. There is a silvery-white median line from the base almost to a projection of the band, as well as a white subdorsal line from one-fourth to the projection of the band. The dorsal edge is white from the base to one-third of the wing and the costal edge is shortly white before the band. There is a rather broad light ochreous-yellowish median band, somewhat narrowed dorsally, the anterior edge marked with two golden-metallic spots, the upper wholly anterior to the lower, followed by a black dot, the edge forming a projection between these, the posterior edge marked with two opposite golden-metallic spots, the lower preceded by a black speck, between these suffusedly projecting and giving rise to a white streak which soon becomes terminal and runs to the apex. The hindwings are light grey.
