= Cosmopterix macroglossa =

Scientific classification
- Kingdom: Animalia
- Phylum: Arthropoda
- Class: Insecta
- Order: Lepidoptera
- Family: Cosmopterigidae
- Genus: Cosmopterix
- Species: C. macroglossa'

Binomial name
- Cosmopterix macroglossa' Meyrick, 1913

Species of moth

Cosmopterix macroglossa is a moth in the family Cosmopterigidae. It was described by Edward Meyrick in 1913. It is found in South Africa.

The wingspan is 14–15 mm. The forewings are bronzy ochreous with a fine white costal streak from the base to the band and with the costal edge dark fuscous from the base to one-third of the wing. There is a slender white median streak reaching from the base to the band and a white subdorsal line from one-fourth to the band, converging to the apex of the median streak. The dorsal edge is white from the base to the band and there is a narrow pale ochreous-yellow median band, the anterior edge marked with two pale golden-metallic spots, the upper followed by a black dot and then by a fuscous mark interrupting the band, the posterior edge suffusedly margined with silvery followed by pale yellow, where a white streak (at first rather broad but soon becoming narrower) runs along the termen to the apex. The hindwings are pale grey.
