= Cosmopterix tetrophthalma =

Scientific classification
- Kingdom: Animalia
- Phylum: Arthropoda
- Clade: Pancrustacea
- Class: Insecta
- Order: Lepidoptera
- Family: Cosmopterigidae
- Genus: Cosmopterix
- Species: C. tetrophthalma

Binomial name
- Cosmopterix tetrophthalma Meyrick, 1921

Species of moth

Cosmopterix tetrophthalma is a moth in the family Cosmopterigidae. It is found in South Africa.
