= Cosmopterix spiculata =

Scientific classification
- Kingdom: Animalia
- Phylum: Arthropoda
- Class: Insecta
- Order: Lepidoptera
- Family: Cosmopterigidae
- Genus: Cosmopterix
- Species: C. spiculata

Binomial name
- Cosmopterix spiculata Meyrick, 1909

Synonyms
- Cosmopteryx spiculata

Species of moth

Cosmopterix spiculata is a moth in the family Cosmopterigidae. It is found in Sri Lanka.
