= Cosmopterix emmolybda =

Scientific classification
- Kingdom: Animalia
- Phylum: Arthropoda
- Class: Insecta
- Order: Lepidoptera
- Family: Cosmopterigidae
- Genus: Cosmopterix
- Species: C. emmolybda

Binomial name
- Cosmopterix emmolybda Meyrick, 1914

Species of moth

Cosmopterix emmolybda is a moth in the family Cosmopterigidae. It was described by Edward Meyrick in 1914. It is found in Malawi.
