= Cosmopterix panopla =

Scientific classification
- Kingdom: Animalia
- Phylum: Arthropoda
- Class: Insecta
- Order: Lepidoptera
- Family: Cosmopterigidae
- Genus: Cosmopterix
- Species: C. panopla

Binomial name
- Cosmopterix panopla Meyrick, 1909

Synonyms
- Cosmopteryx panopla

Species of moth

Cosmopterix panopla is a moth in the family Cosmopterigidae. It is found in Sri Lanka.
