= Cosmopterix scaligera =

Scientific classification
- Kingdom: Animalia
- Phylum: Arthropoda
- Clade: Pancrustacea
- Class: Insecta
- Order: Lepidoptera
- Family: Cosmopterigidae
- Genus: Cosmopterix
- Species: C. scaligera

Binomial name
- Cosmopterix scaligera Meyrick, 1909

Species of moth

Cosmopterix scaligera is a moth in the family Cosmopterigidae. It is found in South Africa.
