= Cosmopterix tabellaria =

Scientific classification
- Kingdom: Animalia
- Phylum: Arthropoda
- Class: Insecta
- Order: Lepidoptera
- Family: Cosmopterigidae
- Genus: Cosmopterix
- Species: C. tabellaria

Binomial name
- Cosmopterix tabellaria Meyrick, 1908

Species of moth

Cosmopterix tabellaria is a moth in the family Cosmopterigidae. It is found in South Africa.
